= Anya =

- Gender: Female

Other names
- See also: Hannah, Anna, Áine, Ana

Anya, Ania or Anja is a given name. The names are feminine in most East European countries and unisex in several African countries.

== Origins and variant forms ==
- Anya (Аня) is a Russian diminutive of Anna.
- Ania is the spelling in Polish, which is also a diminutive of Anna.
- Anya (Аня) in Ukrainian is also a diminutive of Anna and Hanna.
- The spelling Anja is common in Croatian, Norwegian, Danish, German, Swedish, Finnish, Dutch, Afrikaans, Slovenian, Macedonian, Montenegrin, Bosnian, Serbian.
- Anya is sometimes used as an anglicisation of the Irish name Áine.
- Anya is a Kurdish name, meaning "strength" or "power".
- Anya is a Hungarian word for "mother".
- Anya is a Nigerian Igbo name, and also a word for "eye."
- Anya is a variant of the Sanskrit name Aanya, meaning "inexhaustible."
- Anya (ⴰⵏⵢⴰ) is an Amazigh name, meaning "rhythm" or "silent melody."

== People with the given name Anya ==
- Anya Ayoung-Chee (born 1981), former Miss Trinidad and Tobago and winner of season 9 of Project Runway
- Anya Chalotra, British actress
- Anya Corke (born 1990), grandmaster and the top female chess player in Hong Kong
- Anya Gallaccio (born 1963), Scottish artist
- Anya Garnis (born 1982), Siberian ballroom and Latin dancer
- Anya Geraldine (born 1995), Indonesian actress and model
- Anja Haga (born 1968), Dutch politician
- Anya Hindmarch (born 1968), British fashion designer
- Anya Kamenetz (born 1980), American writer and journalist
- Anya Lahiri (born 1982), English singer
- Anya Lawrence (born 2004), British actress
- Anya Major (born 1966), British athlete, actress, model and singer
- Anya Marina (born 1976), American singer-songwriter
- Anya Monzikova (born 1984), Russian-American model and actress
- Anya Schiffrin (born 1962), American journalist and writer, international business professor at Columbia University
- Anya Seton (1904–1990), American author of historical romances
- Anya Shrubsole (born 1991), English cricketer
- Anya Singh (born 1992), Indian actress
- Anya Taranda (1915–1970), American model
- Anya Taylor-Joy (born 1996), actress
- Anya Teixeira (1913–1992), Ukrainian-born British street photographer
- A'nya, Russo-Japanese talent Anna Murashige's nickname

== People with the given name Anja ==
- Anja Althaus (born 1982), German handball player
- Anja Andersen (born 1969), Danish handball player
- Anja Barugh (born 1999), New Zealand freestyle skier
- Anja Blacha (born 1990), German mountaineer
- Anja Breien (1940–2026), Norwegian film director and screenwriter
- Anja Daems (born 1968), Belgian television and radio presenter
- Anja Garbarek (born 1970), Norwegian musician
- Anja Hammerseng-Edin (born 1983), Norwegian handball player
- Anja Hatakka (1938–2026), Finnish actress and beauty pageant competitor
- Anja Hazekamp (born 1968), Dutch politician
- Anja Kampmann (born 1983), German poet and novelist
- Anja Kotar, Slovenian singer-songwriter, pianist and pop musician
- Anja Pärson (born 1981), Swedish alpine skier
- Anja Plaschg (born 1990), alias Soap&Skin, Austrian musician
- Anja Ringgren Lovén (born 1978), Danish charity worker
- Anja Rubik (born 1983), Polish fashion model
- Anja Šimpraga (born 1987), Croatian politician
- Anja Sodnikar (born 2003), Austrian singer-songwriter
- Anja Spasojević (born 1983), Serbian professional volleyball player
- Anja Strømme, ionospheric physicist
- Anja Vanrobaeys (born 1968), Belgian politician

== People with the given name Ania ==
- Ania (singer) (born 1981), Polish singer and composer
- Ania Freer (born 1986), Australian-Jamaican documentary filmmaker
- Ania Marson, Polish actress
- Ania Said Chaurembo, Tanzanian politician
- Ania Walwicz (1951–2020), Australian poet and prose writer
- Ania Wiśniewska (born 1977), Polish singer

== Fictional characters ==
- Aanya, the Queen of Duren from The Dragon Prince
- Anya, daughter of the Marvel Comics character Magneto
- Anya, or Princess Ann, a character in the film Roman Holiday
- Anya, or Princess Anastasia, protagonist of the 1997 film Anastasia
- Anya, in the video game Diablo II: Lord of Destruction
- Anya, in the video game Mouthwashing
- Anya, in the video game Project I.G.I.
- Anya, in the television series Star Trek: The Next Generation
- Anastasia "Anya" Yurievna Cocolova, in the manga series Negima! Magister Negi Magias
- Anya, in the television series The 100
- Anya Alstreim, in the anime series Code Geass
- Anya Amasova, in the film The Spy Who Loved Me
- Anya Borzakovskaya, in the graphic novel Anya's Ghost
- Anya Claus, in the film Santa Claus: The Movie
- Anya Corazon, in Marvel Comics
- Anya Forger, in the manga and anime series Spy × Family
- Anya Hepburn, in the manga series Soul Eater Not!
- Anya Jenkins, in the television series Buffy the Vampire Slayer
- Anya MacPherson, in the television series Degrassi: The Next Generation
- Anya Oliwa, in the video game Wolfenstein: The New Order
- Anya Stroud, in the video game series Gears of War
- Ania Williams, in the soap opera Family Affairs
- Anya Beletskaya, in the VOCALOID song series Parties are for Losers
- Anastasia "Anya", a character in the video game The Idolmaster: Cinderella
- Anya Butler, a main character of the 2026 TV show The Body, played by Kristina Bogic

== People with the surname Anya ==
- Ikechi Anya (born 1988), Scottish footballer

== See also ==
- Áine (given name), an Irish given name with the same pronunciation
- Anya (disambiguation), other meanings
- Ania (disambiguation)
