= List of Soul Eater characters =

The main characters of Soul Eater (from left to right): Top row: Black Star, Tsubaki Nakatsukasa, Soul Eater Evans, and Maka Albarn. Bottom row: Liz and Patty Thompson, Death the Kid, Blair, and Spirit Albarn.

The Soul Eater manga and anime series features an extensive cast of fictional characters created by Atsushi Ohkubo. It is set in a fictional universe inhabited by various characters capable of using supernatural powers by channeling the wavelengths of their souls. Most of the characters in the series, including the main protagonists, are classified into two groups: humans who are born with the power to turn into weapons, called "demon weapons", and the wielders of these weapons, called "meisters". The main protagonists attend a school called Death Weapon Meister Academy (DWMA) located in the fictional Death City in Nevada, United States. DWMA is run by Shinigami, also known as Death, or the Grim Reaper, as a training facility for weapons and meisters to hone their powers, as well as an organization to preserve world order against anyone who threatens it, including witches, monsters and kishin, which are essentially humans who become monstrous creatures by devouring the souls of innocent people.

The main Soul Eater manga and its anime adaptation follow three meister/weapon partnerships—Maka Albarn and her scythe, Soul Eater; Black Star and his shadow weapon, Tsubaki Nakatsukasa; and Death the Kid and his twin pistols, Liz and Patty Thompson. These three teams and their fellow students act as field agents for their school, reaping the souls of evil humans to prevent them from turning into kishin. The spin-off prequel manga titled Soul Eater Not!, also created by Ohkubo, follows the everyday lives of three other DWMA students—halberd Tsugumi Harudori and her two meister friends, Meme Tatane and Anya Hepburn.

== Creation and conception ==
While creating Soul Eater, Atsushi Ohkubo was heavily influenced by the manga series Dr. Slump and wanted to create a story in which serious or intense action scenes would be defused or interrupted with comedic moments. The story element in which characters transform into weapons is an expansion on the idea of weapons being personified, which Ohkubo frequently saw in other fictional stories. Ohkubo decided to make the main protagonist of the series, Maka Albarn, a female in response to other shōnen manga having male main characters, and paired her and the other main characters with those of the opposite sex to demonstrate an equal representation of gender. He also decided to use a scythe as Maka's weapon for its unique fighting style. He resisted drawing influence from other people for most of his characters, particularly the main protagonists, whom he instead based on assets on his own personality—the arrogant Black Star is based on Ohkubo's narcissistic side, the neurotic Death the Kid based on his manic side, etc. However, he did base a few characters on people he was familiar with, such as Excalibur, whose personality he based on his own father. He also designed supporting character Kilik Rung to be black after noting a lack of African characters in other manga series. The names of several characters are based on the titles of other films as a form of tribute, such as Blair being named after The Blair Witch Project and Kilik after Kirikou and the Sorceress.

== Main characters ==
The three main meisters of Soul Eater wielding their partners in weapon form (from left to right): Death the Kid, Maka Albarn, and Black Star.

=== Soul Eater ===
==== Maka Albarn ====
Voiced by: Junko Takeuchi (drama CD), Chiaki Omigawa (anime)^{ep. 1} (Japanese); Laura Bailey^{ep. 1} (English)

Maka Albarn (マカ=アルバーン, Maka Arubān) is one of the main protagonists of Soul Eater. She is a young but dedicated student who takes after her mother, another prodigious meister. However, her relationship with her father, Spirit, is strained due to his constant flirtations with women, leading her parents to divorce. As such, Maka is obsessed with turning her weapon partner, Soul Eater, into a death scythe that will surpass her father.^{[ch. 0a]} She collaborates well with Soul in battle, but sometimes gets frustrated at him when he does something foolish. When in danger, however, Maka does everything she can to keep Soul out of harm's way.^{[ch. 4]}

Early in the story, Soul is infected with black blood during their first battle against Crona, which causes Maka to become infected as well, risking her going insane under the black blood's influence.^{[ch. 11]} She later gains some control over the black blood by developing a soul wavelength inherited from her mother called the Anti-Magic Wavelength, which helps her resist the effects of insanity.^{[ch. 60]} She is also adept at a skill called Soul Perception, which allows her to detect the souls of other people and measure their strengths.^{[ch. 2]} After turning Soul into a death scythe, Maka gains the ability to combine the power of her uniquely shaped soul, called a Grigori soul, with Soul's and grow angelic wings on Soul's weapon form, enabling her to fly.^{[ch. 63]} Maka can fully synchronize with Spirit due to their bond as father and daughter.^{[ch. 106]} In the anime adaptation, Maka is shown to have demon weapon powers inherited from her father and mother, allowing her to conjure blades from her body while she is unconscious.^{ep. 51}

==== Soul "Eater" Evans ====
Voiced by: Sōichirō Hoshi (drama CD), Kōki Uchiyama (anime) (Japanese); Micah Solusod ^{ep. 1} (English)

Soul Evans (ソウル・エヴァンス, Sōru Evansu), nicknamed Soul Eater (ソウル=イーター, Sōru Ītā), is a demon scythe and the partner of Maka Albarn, and one of the main protagonists. His weapon form has a red-and-black blade and an eye near its heel which expresses his emotions. He has a laid-back and nonchalant personality and tries to maintain a "cool" attitude, but often ends up embarrassing himself instead.^{[ch. 0a]} He tends to bicker with Maka over unimportant things from time to time, but is fiercely loyal to her and has more than once displayed his will to die for his friends' safety.^{[ch. 2]} After he is slashed in the chest by Ragnarok and infected with the Demon Sword's blood, he fights to resist the madness-inducing effects of the blood, which is portrayed by the little demon who appears within his subconscious.

As a member of a renowned family of musicians, Soul's innate talent as a pianist cannot be disputed, but it's his newfound powers as a weapon that have allowed him to break ties with his family's tradition and aim for the title of the strongest death scythe. He dislikes being compared to his older brother Wes, a famous violinist, and is reluctant to play music for other people.^{[ch. 55]} He can use this talent when resonating his soul wavelength with others, playing the piano within his soul to drastically enhance their power.^{[ch. 36]} He manages to become a death scythe after defeating Arachne with Maka and eating her soul, gaining the ability to use sound waves and sabotage enemies with his "Soul Hack" attack.^{[ch. 62]} In the aftermath of Asura's defeat, due to Kid's agreement with the witches to make no more death scythes, Soul becomes the last death scythe created.

==== Black Star ====
Voiced by: Yumiko Kobayashi^{ep. 1} (Japanese); Brittney Karbowski^{ep. 1} (English)

Black Star (ブラック☆スター, Burakku Sutā; stylized as "Black☆Star") is a ninja assassin and the meister of Tsubaki. He is exceedingly arrogant and loudmouthed for an assassin, preferring to make a flashy entrance rather than sneaking up on his opponents, and tries to upstage anyone who gains more attention than he does.^{[ch. 0b]} He frequently calls himself a "big" man destined to surpass God, thus driving himself to his physical limits. He is a skilled combatant even when unarmed, using a skill that allows him to increase his own soul wavelength and channel it through physical attacks.^{[ch. 2]} He is one of the last remaining survivors of the Star Clan, a family of assassins who slaughtered others for wealth until they were wiped out by DWMA, whereupon academy Professor Sid Barrett took him in and raised him. He is oppressed by anyone who recognizes the clan's symbol, a star-shaped tattoo on his shoulder.^{[ch. 7]} Due to his obsession with power, some believe he will eventually descend down the path towards becoming a kishin like his father, White Star.^{[ch. 39]} However, in his final battle with Mifune, he resists such temptation and chooses to create his own new path instead, eventually leading him to become a warrior god (武神, bushin).^{[ch. 110]}

==== Tsubaki Nakatsukasa ====
Voiced by: Mamiko Noto (drama CD), Kaori Nazuka (anime)^{ep. 1} (Japanese); Monica Rial^{ep. 1} (English)

Tsubaki Nakatsukasa (中務 椿, Nakatsukasa Tsubaki) is the weapon partner of Black Star, classified as a "shadow weapon" who has the power to transform into a variety of ninja weapons including a kusarigama, a shuriken, a ninjatō, and a smoke bomb.^{[ch. 0b]} She is gentle, quiet, friendly, and easy going, and provides a soothing influence among her friends whenever they argue. She is also very patient and tolerant of others, which allows her to put up with Black Star's constant arrogance and showboating, and serves as a highly collaborative partner in battle.^{[ch. 2]} Her multiple weapon forms are part of a tradition passed down by her family, descended from the first demon weapons created by Arachne.^{[ch. 28]} She later acquires her most powerful form, the Uncanny Sword, after absorbing the soul of her corrupted brother Masamune.^{[ch. 8]} She primarily takes the form of a black katana in this form, but is eventually able to transform it into other weapons as she ordinarily does.^{[ch. 49]}

==== Death the Kid ====
Voiced by: Takako Honda (drama CD), Mamoru Miyano (anime)^{ep. 2} (Japanese); Todd Haberkorn^{ep. 2} (English)

Death the Kid (デス・ザ・キッド, Desu za Kiddo), called "Kid" for short, is the son of Shinigami. His name took inspiration from Billy the Kid. Kid is created from a part of his father's being like his older brother Asura as an incomplete shinigami, modeled after his father's creator Shinra Kusakabe. Lacking his father's aspect of fear and starting out as a child, however, Kid grows and develops his own personality.^{[ch. 72]} His status as a shinigami grants him formidable godlike powers such as invincibility to a point, but he suffers from asymmetriphobia and a crippling obsessive-compulsive disorder for symmetry in everyday life, stemming from his father's "madness of order".^{[ch. 0c]} This mindset results in him becoming the meister of the Thompson sisters after seeing their matching weapon forms as a means to preserve his personal symmetry, but unable to fight using one of them while the other is missing.^{[ch. 13]} Because of his status as shinigami and a polished meister, Kid is not required to collect souls or attend DWMA, but he does so anyway to create custom weapons suited to his desires.^{[ch. 0c]}

Kid's most distinguishing feature is the set of three white lines on the left side of his hair called the Lines of Sanzu, which plagues him at times due to their asymmetry. However, the Lines of Sanzu are revealed to be symbol of his status as a shinigami, and their eventual connection would awaken his full power.^{[ch. 110]} Later in the story, upon learning of his origins as the technical brother of Asura, Kid fears becoming a greater threat than his brother if he unlocks his full potential. However, after being assured by Maka and understanding his father's true power in the process, Kid connects the lines and assumes his true form, thus killing his father, as only one true shinigami can exist at a time.^{[ch. 111]}

==== Liz and Patty Thompson ====
Liz: Voiced by: Yūko Kaida (drama CD), Akeno Watanabe (anime)^{ep. 2} (Japanese); Jamie Marchi^{ep. 2} (English)
Patty: Voiced by: Miyuki Sawashiro (drama CD), Narumi Takahira (anime)^{ep. 2} (Japanese); Cherami Leigh^{ep. 2} (English)

Elizabeth Thompson (エリザベス・トンプソン, Erizabesu Tonpuson) and her younger sister Patricia Thompson (パトリシア・トンプソン, Patorishia Tonpuson) – nicknamed Liz (リズ, Rizu) and Patty (パティ, Pati), respectively – are the weapon partners of Death the Kid. Liz is a cynical but mature, smart and resourceful young woman who always finds Kid's perfectionist attitude annoying, but is deathly afraid of ghosts and anything she labels as "creepy". Her younger sister, Patty, is known to be extremely childish, but is able to maintain a cheerful attitude in any situation that is replaced with an insane, psychotic anger when motivating her teammates or when angered. They both take the form of semi-automatic pistols that compress Kid's soul wavelength and fire it in the form of energy bullets that range in strength from destructive blasts to painful yet harmless shots.^{[ch. 3]} Both sisters are able to act as each other's meisters whenever Kid is absent.^{[ch. 0c]} As infants, they were abandoned on the streets of Brooklyn and survive by mugging members of the public. They originally joined Kid to exploit his wealth and authority as a shinigami, but grew closer to Kid over time and outgrew their greed.^{[ch. 78]}

=== Soul Eater Not! ===
==== Tsugumi Harudori ====
Voiced by: Haruka Chisuga (Japanese); Bryn Apprill (English)

Tsugumi Harudori (春鳥 つぐみ, Harudori Tsugumi) is the main protagonist of Soul Eater Not!, a Magic Weapon who becomes a halberd with a dull blade. She is a weapon transfer student from Japan who attends DWMA's NOT class, a class designed for weapons and meisters who want to control their powers in order to lead normal lives. Originally a timid romantic, Tsugami seeks to improve herself since meeting Maka on her first, wanting to emulate the confident senior student. She becomes friends with two Meisters, Meme Tatane and Anya Hepburn, alternating between them as a weapon, but will eventually pick one of them to be her official meister partner. She has a habit of exclaiming "Gagantous" when she is shocked or surprised, a word with no apparent meaning.

==== Meme Tatane ====
Voiced by: Aoi Yūki (Japanese); Lindsay Seidel (English)

Meme Tatane (多々音 めめ, Tatane Meme) is a meister student from DWMA's NOT class and one of the main protagonists of Soul Eater Not!. She suffers from short-term memory loss and occasionally forgets her own name. She is also very well-endowed for her age, which Tsugumi envies her for. Despite her spacy nature, however, she is very athletic and specializes in a form of martial art called "Sleepy Fist" (睡拳, Suiken), which she can only perform when partially unconscious. She befriends Tsugumi after she defends her from being bullied on their first day of class, and takes turns with Anya as Tsugumi's meister partner. She specializes in using the axe portion of Tsugumi's weapon form.

==== Anya Hepburn ====
Voiced by: Saori Hayami (Japanese); Alexis Tipton (English)

Anya Hepburn (アーニャ・ヘプバーン, Ānya Hepubān), like Meme, is a meister from DWMA's NOT class and a main protagonist of Soul Eater Not!. Coming from a wealthy family, she acts condescendingly towards other people, referring to them as "commoners", but has become tired of her restrictive lifestyle and attends DWMA to better understand commoners. She becomes fascinated by Tsugumi, believing her to be the most average commoner of all, and desires to become her partner. She thus takes turns with Meme to wield Tsugumi; Anya becomes an expert with wielding the spear portion of Tsugumi's weapon form. Anya also tends to fight Black Star on a regular basis, their fights usually resulting with the DWMA building's symmetry being ruined. Her true identity is later revealed to be Princess Anastasia Yngling (アナスタシア・ユングリング, Anasutashia Yunguringu), whose family's considerable influence led an agreement with the DWMA for her to attend the school only on the condition that the entire country would protect her and that she was to immediately return to her home country should she be endangered.

== Villains ==
=== Asura ===
Voiced by: Toshio Furukawa (Japanese); Chris Patton (English)^{ep. 24}^{ep. 24}

Asura (阿修羅, Ashura), also known as the Kishin (鬼神; lit. 'fierce god'), is the ultimate antagonist of Soul Eater.^{[vol. 5]} Originally one of the Great Old Ones eight centuries ago, Asura comes into being when Shinigami separates a fragment of his soul and gives it life. As that fragment contains Shinigami's fear,^{[ch. 72]} it reflects in Asura's madness through his paranoid tendencies and quirks such as covering his face with bandages and wearing multiple layers of clothing. Eventually, to quell his constant fear, Asura swallows his own weapon Vajra (ヴァジュラ, Vajura) whole in order to devour human souls until he transforms into a godlike being. In that state, Asura can emit his "madness of terror", which deters the sanity of anyone in his presence until they are mindless beasts. Asura is eventually defeated by Shinigami, who rips off Asura's skin to use as a container to seal him in a shrine beneath the DWMA building, preventing him from escaping while have the DWMA deal with those affected by Asura's "madness wavelength".^{[ch. 16]}

Early in the story, Asura is resurrected after Medusa's minions inject him with black blood and he escapes after a brief battle with Death.^{[ch. 22]} Though his intensified madness wavelength greatly influences the manga's plot, Asura remains largely absent until he is discovered by Maka to be hiding on the cartoonish moon in Earth's atmosphere.^{[ch. 90]} After his Clown army is defeated, Asura comes out of hiding and is absorbed by Crona before taking the child's body as his own. By the time Death the Kid arrives to fight him, Asura reveals their relationship before his younger brother awakens his full power to face him as an equal. However, after the two meet and develop a plan to stop him, Maka manages to make Asura bleed while Crona uses BREW to manipulate the black blood to create a barrier around the moon to trap Asura on it.

In the anime adaptation, Asura's whereabouts after his escape from Death City have him being found in a Tibetan mountain range by Arachne, who aims to spread his madness wavelength across the world.^{ep. 39} After defeating Shinigami in a second battle, revealing that he learned to stop imagining to overcome his personal fears before learning he developed feelings for the witch, Asura kills Arachne to rid himself of his weakness and eats her soul to transform into a monster.^{ep. 48} Even after reverting to his original state, Asura overpowers the meisters until only Maka remains to fight on her own after Soul is knocked out. However, Maka's persistence and bravery confuse Asura, who relapses back into fearful paranoia before he explodes after being punched in the face by Maka channeling her courage into her fist.^{ep. 51}

=== Gorgon Sisters ===
==== Medusa ====
Voiced by: Houko Kuwashima (Japanese); Luci Christian (English)^{ep. 7}^{ep. 7}

Medusa (メデューサ, Medyūsa) is the first major villainess introduced in the story and the middle of the three Gorgon sisters, a snake-themed witch who contains over a thousand snake familiars inside her body that she can use in her Vector Arrow spell.^{[ch. 5, 9]} She can also create arrow-shaped panels on the ground called Vector Plates that throw anyone standing on them in the direction they point.^{[ch. 17]} Medusa is a scientist who developed black blood, a substance that enhances madness within people, and aims to use it as part of her experiment to enable the world to evolve and no longer be stagnated by the DWMA's actions.^{[ch. 15]} Medusa is resolute of her goals to the point of experimenting on her own child Crona whose purpose is essential to her overall scheme.^{[ch. 4]}

Prior to the start of the story, Medusa infiltrates the DWMA under the guise of a school nurse to find Asura's location, amassing an entourage to help her revive the kishin with black blood.^{[ch. 15]} Though defeated by Franken Stein shortly after her plan succeeds,^{[ch. 22]} Medusa survives the destruction of her original body in the form of a snake, which possesses the body of a young girl named Rachel.^{[ch. 29]} When her plans are impeded by Arachne,^{[ch. 30]} kidnapping Crona to make it seem to be sister's doing, Medusa forms a truce with DWMA to dispose of Arachnophobia and provides leverage with the demon tool Brew.^{[ch. 45]} Once she acquires Arachne's soulless body, Medusa continues her experiments on Crona for her master plan to have the child be able to assimilate Asura.^{[ch. 60]} This plan ultimately culminates with Medusa showing Crona affection for the first time in her child's life, intentionally provoking the confused Crona into killing her.^{[ch. 87]}

In the anime adaptation, Medusa uses the truce between her and DWMA to manipulate Stein instead of defeating Arachnophobia. To do so, she forces Crona to implant a magic snake inside of an unsuspecting Marie Mjolnir to worsen Stein's already increasing madness—an act that is present in the manga's plot as a means to keep Stein from interfering with her plans^{[ch. 32]}—until he runs away from DWMA and joins her.^{ep. 41} She battles Maka, Marie, and a repentant Crona until Maka defeats her without harming Rachel's body,^{ep. 45} although Medusa's snake form is seen in the final episode.^{ep. 51}

==== Arachne ====
Voiced by: Michiko Neya (Japanese); Stephanie Young (English)^{ep. 27}^{ep. 27}

Arachne (アラクネ, Arakune), the leader of Arachnophobia, is the second major villainess introduced in the series. She is a spider-like witch and the oldest of the three Gorgon sisters. Called a heretic among her kind, Arachne is responsible for creating the first demon weapons 800 years before the series by combining the souls of her fellow witches with humans and ordinary weapons. She goes into hiding for 800 years after being betrayed by her sister Medusa, and escapes Shinigami by scattering her body across the world in the form of countless black spiders and hiding the bulk of her soul inside a golem. She returns to power after Asura awakens and begins spreading his madness wavelength across the world. Her plans involve capturing Asura and plunging the world into madness, eventually discarding her physical body to become a spiritual entity of pure madness to gain the power necessary to control Asura.^{[ch. 58]} She is killed by Maka and Soul, who collect her soul and later use it to turn the latter into a death scythe,^{[ch. 62]} while Medusa possesses Arachne's lifeless body to use as her own.^{[ch. 60]} In the anime adaptation, Arachne succeeds in capturing Asura and uses a demon tool called the Morality Manipulation Machine to amplify his madness wavelength. However, Asura turns on her and eats her soul to increase his own strength even further.^{ep. 48}

==== Shaula ====
Voiced by: Ami Koshimizu (Japanese); Elizabeth Maxwell (English)

Shaula (シャウラ, Shaura) only appears in Soul Eater Not! as the story's principal villainess. She is a scorpion witch and the youngest of the three Gorgon sisters, desiring to prove her superiority over her older sisters Medusa and Arachne. She commands minions called "Traitors" (道場破り, Toreta), brainwashed individuals with superhuman strength who enter Death City for the sole purpose of challenging members of the DWMA, to gather intelligence on the organization as part of her agenda.

=== Crona and Ragnarok ===
Crona: Voiced by: Maaya Sakamoto (Japanese); Maxey Whitehead (English)^{ep. 7}^{ep. 7}
Ragnarok: Voiced by: Keiji Himeno (Japanese); Sonny Strait (English)^{ep. 7}^{ep. 7}

Crona (クロナ, Kurona) is Medusa's child and the wielder of Ragnarok (ラグナロク, Ragunaroku), a weapon also known as the Demon Sword (魔剣, Maken), which takes the form of a black longsword. Crona is androgynous in appearance, leaving the character's gender unknown,^{[ch. 14]} though Crona is addressed with male pronouns in the Yen Press and Funimation translations of the manga and anime, respectively, because they felt that "it" would have been insulting to Crona as a character. Atsushi Ohkubo, the creator of Soul Eater, has stated that Crona's gender is "unknown". To reflect the creator's stated intent of keeping the gender of the character unknown, the Square Enix translation of the manga uses gender-neutral language and pronouns when referring to Crona.

As a child, Crona's blood is replaced with a sanity-weakening substance called black blood, which Ragnarok's essence is mixed into. This forms a symbiotic relationship between Crona and Ragnarok, the latter of whom appears from Crona's body in a black, vaguely humanoid form when not in his weapon form. Because of Medusa's abuse and Ragnarok's bullying, Crona is extremely reclusive and fearful of almost everything. Unlike normal weapon and meister pairs, who synchronize their soul wavelengths to increase their strength, Crona uses a skill called Scream Resonance (悲鳴共鳴, Himei Kyōmei) together with Ragnarok, who emits a scream from the mouth on their weapon form's blade that causes it to vibrate and deal additional damage. The black blood can also harden to prevent physical damage, and can extend from Crona's wounds to be used as an additional weapon.^{[ch. 4]}

Crona is forced by Medusa to devour human souls through Ragnarok as part of Medusa's experiment for Crona to evolve into a kishin. Crona initially becomes Maka's archenemy after infecting Soul with Ragnarok's black blood during their first encounter,^{[ch. 16]} but ends up befriending Maka after she purifies Crona's soul,^{[ch. 19]} which causes Ragnarok to shrink into a super deformed shape.^{[ch. 24]} Following Medusa's defeat, Crona surrenders to DWMA and enrolls as a trial student, where they become closer with Maka and her friends, but they are quickly pressured by Medusa to act as her spy within the school.^{[ch. 31]} Later, Crona is kidnapped by Medusa and brainwashed into forgetting Maka and the group entirely, once again becoming Medusa's pawn.^{[ch. 60]} Crona is eventually ordered to be executed by DWMA for destroying an entire city in Ukraine and killing the death scythe stationed there, after which Crona is coerced by Medusa into killing her as part of the final stage in Medusa's experiment.^{[ch. 87]} Having fully awakened the black blood, yet retaining knowledge of Medusa's plan, Crona departs for the moon to find Asura. Once fulfilling that objective, Crona is confronted by Maka and her friends shortly before losing control as Asura takes over their body.^{[ch. 104]} Although thought to have been completely assimilated by Asura, Crona remains intact within their subconscious even after they are found again by Maka. By that time, having given thought to past actions, they decide to sacrifice their freedom by trapping themselves with Asura to contain the madness. They do this by using the Book of Eibon to access BREW and create a seal around the moon. Just before the seal is made, Crona thanks Maka for her friendship, and Maka promises to come back for Crona one day.

In the anime adaptation, after carrying out Medusa's orders to drive Franken Stein insane, Crona tries to run away from DWMA out of guilt, but is stopped by Maka and persuaded into admitting the betrayal.^{ep. 39} Crona is expelled and imprisoned within the school as punishment but, with Shinigami's blessing, is allowed to help rescue Stein from Medusa, who had formed a truce with DWMA that forbids anyone from the organization to harm her. Crona battles Medusa together with Maka and Marie Mjolnir, the latter of whom also temporarily leaves DWMA to accompany them.^{ep. 42} Crona is mortally wounded while defending Maka in the battle,^{ep. 45} but is brought back to full health by the rescued Stein and becomes a full-time DWMA student.^{ep. 51}

=== Witches ===
Witches in Soul Eater are the natural enemies of DWMA, each themed after an animal. Due to their destructive nature, witches are hunted down by Meisters to be used as a final ingredient to transform their weapon partners into death scythes.^{[ch. 0a, 61]} They are led by their queen, Maba (魔婆, Mabaa; translated as "Grandwitch" in the Funimation dub). Witches possess the natural ability to perform magic, which commonly entices them to follow destructive instinct; however, those with regenerative magic, like Kim Diehl, are immune to this instinct. Similar to how members of DWMA develop skills to help them hunt witches, such as the ability to sense their unique soul wavelengths, witches develop skills to counterbalance DWMA, such as using an ability called Soul Protect to disguise their souls as ordinary ones at will,^{[ch. 5]} which also prevents them from using magic for as long as their barrier holds.^{[ch. 9]} Eventually, with Medusa's death, DWMA has a ceasefire with the witches to deal with the threat of Crona and Asura, and an official truce is established between the two groups after Death the Kid replaces his father as the new shinigami.

==== Eruka Frog ====
Voiced by: Misato Fukuen (Japanese); Kate Oxley (English)^{ep. 12}^{ep. 12}

Eruka Frog (エルカ=フロッグ, Eruka Furoggu) is a frog-themed witch who is enslaved by Medusa after a failed attempt at killing her, resulting in Medusa infesting her body with countless magical snakes that would rip her to shreds.^{[ch. 9]} Eruka is consequently forced to carry out various tasks for Medusa with the promise that one of these snakes be removed for every task she completes.^{[ch. 10]} Keeping with her frog-like nature, she makes croaking sounds whenever she speaks. She despises Medusa, believing that her plans threaten the existence of all witches. Cowardly in nature, she has the power to transform herself into a frog to escape from danger and spy on others. She can create tadpole-shaped bombs as weapons, and keeps a giant flying tadpole as a mount. Eventually, with Medusa dead, she is drafted to aid the DWMA in setting up the ceasefire with the other witches.

==== Mizune ====
Voiced by: Mayuki Makiguchi (Japanese); Trina Nishimura (English)^{ep. 12}^{ep. 12}

Mizune (ミズネ) is the name of a family of identical mouse-like witch sisters. There are originally six of them, but the oldest sister is killed by Medusa early in the story while helping Eruka during the attempt on her life.^{[ch. 9]} The remaining five become Medusa's servants after being misled to believe that DWMA is responsible for the death of their oldest.^{[ch. 15]} They have the ability to transform themselves into mice and create beams of energy in place of whiskers on their face, which can cut through anything. They can also combine their bodies into other forms that increase with age, size, and power depending on how many sisters combine. They are incapable of communicating beyond mouse-like squeaks unless they are in their combined forms.

==== Free ====
Voiced by: Rintarō Nishi (Japanese); Travis Willingham (English)^{ep. 12}^{ep. 12}

Free (フリー, Furī), also known as the "Man with the Magic Eye" (魔眼の男, Magan no Otoko) is an immortal werewolf who is imprisoned for 200 years for stealing the left eye of the Maba and replacing his own with it, giving him witch-like status.^{[ch. 10]} He is broken out of prison on Medusa's behalf and becomes the witch's minion out of gratitude. Having forgotten his real name while in prison, he calls himself "Free" to celebrate his freedom.^{[ch. 10]} He is generally carefree and clumsy, which occasionally causes him to injure himself in battle.^{[ch. 11]} As a werewolf, he has the power to transform into his lupine form at will, granting him enhanced strength and speed. He also has a rapid healing factor which, combined with his immortality, makes him virtually invincible. The magic eye he stole from Maba gives him access to additional magic powers such as conjuring ice to form weapons, and manipulating space to trap others inside another dimension and create magical projections of himself.^{[ch. 15,20]} Eventually, getting himself captured in a failed attempt to save Eruka, Free is drafted to aid the DWMA in setting up the ceasefire with the witches.

=== Clown ===
Voiced by: Hirofumi Nojima (Japanese); Jerry Jewell (English)^{ep. 43}^{ep. 43}

A clown (道化師, dōkeshi) is the name given to any physical embodiment of madness in Soul Eater that takes the form of a vaguely humanoid clown. Clowns begin to surface in the story as a result of Asura's madness wavelength, which is concentrated in certain areas until it takes a physical form. These clowns serve to spread Asura's madness throughout the world, and are capable of driving other humans in their presence insane.^{[ch. 42]} They can also transform themselves into armors that increase the physical strength of those who wear them while also enhancing their madness. The first clown introduced in the story is responsible for driving Justin Law insane, subsequently serving as the death scythe's partner thereafter. Medusa also creates her own artificial clowns for use in her experiments on madness, one of which is compatible with Crona.^{[ch. 66]} A trio of clowns – Kaguya (加具夜), White Rabbit (白兎, Shiro Usagi), and Moonlight (月光, Gekkō) – manifest on the moon's surface as a line of defense for Asura. Though they regularly regenerate through the effects of Asura's madness wavelength, the three Clowns are destroyed once the witches use their Soul Protect to cancel their healing ability.^{[ch. 91, 94]}

In the anime, modeled after Justin's Clown, two Clowns appear as autonomous robots designed to guard the last Magic Tool created by Eibon and test those who try to claim it, having devoured everyone in the town of Sarcophagus where the artifact was hidden twenty years prior. Though they had an advantage due to their symmetrical appearance when side by side, the Clowns are destroyed by Death the Kid.

=== Arachnophobia ===
Arachnophobia (アラクノフォビア, Arakunofobia) is an organization created by the witch Arachne before she first disappeared 800 years prior to the story. It directly opposes DWMA's ideals of world order, becoming a major antagonistic force in the story.^{[ch. 26]} The group is dissolved after Arachne is killed during DWMA's raid on their base of operations, Baba Yaga's Castle.^{[ch. 60]}^{ep. 49}

==== Mosquito ====
Voiced by: Takashi Inagaki (Japanese); Mark Stoddard (English)^{ep. 27}^{ep. 27}

Mosquito (モスキート, Mosukīto) is Arachne's steward and most faithful servant, having managed Arachnophobia during her absence.^{[ch. 26]} He appears as a short old man with a long, pointed nose which, true to his name, can drain the blood of a victim to sustain his life and heal himself.^{[ch. 28]} He often argues and fights with Giriko, who he hates for his unrefined attitude. Having lived well over 800 years, his body is stated to have taken different forms over time, and can transform into these past stages at will. While a number of these forms are bestial in appearance—his form 100 years prior has a massive, nigh invulnerable upper body,^{[ch. 35]} while his form 200 years ago has a slender, agile body and an even larger nose^{[ch. 52]}—his most dangerous known form is that of a handsome man with slicked back hair as he was 400 years prior, which can transform into a legion of bats.^{[ch. 53]} He is destroyed by Noah before he has the chance to unleash his ultimate form of 800 years prior.^{[ch. 56]} In the anime, he battles Shinigami while piloting Baba Yaga's Castle in the form of a giant mecha to counter the mecha Shinigami transforms Death City into.^{ep. 47}

==== Giriko ====
Voiced by: Nobutoshi Canna (Japanese); J. Michael Tatum (English)^{ep. 26}^{ep. 26}

Giriko (ギリコ) is a psychotic, foul-mouthed demon weapon with an insatiable bloodlust, and another loyal follower of Arachne. His weapon form is a chainsaw, but prefers not to fight with a meister and can produce a chain around his body to fight in his human form. He is also an Enchanter with the ability to create golems and bring them to life. He is the creator of the golem Arachne used to hide her soul in 800 years in the past, and uses his Enchanter powers to pass his memories down to his children for thirty generations under the name Saw (ソウ, Sō) until Arachne's eventual return.^{[ch. 24,25]} Upon Arachne's defeat, Giriko joins forces with Noah and fights Maka to avenge Arachne,^{[ch. 74]} going as far as preparing a new (albeit female) body for himself to continue the battle after his old body is destroyed.^{[ch. 76]} However, Giriko dies before he can kill Maka when his soul spontaneously explodes, unable to withstand the homicidal hatred he carried for 800 years.^{[ch. 77]}

==== Mifune ====
Voiced by: Kenjirō Tsuda (Japanese); Robert McCollum (English)^{ep. 2}^{ep. 2}

Mifune (ミフネ), named after Toshirō Mifune,^{[vol. 1]} is a master samurai and bodyguard of a young witch named Angela Leon (アンジェラ･レオン, Anjera Reon). Despite being an ordinary human, he has a massive soul equivalent in power to that of 99 ordinary human souls. He uses a fighting style called the Infinite One-Sword Style (無限一刀流, Mugen Ittōryū), which allows him to fight with multiple katanas that he carries in a large scabbard and scatters around the battlefield. He is fond of children, which originally led him to leave the mafia family he was employed to after being ordered to capture Angela. It is also because of his concern for Angela that he joins Arachnophobia, the only organization he believes is willing to provide Angela's safety.^{[ch. 27]} He forms a strong rivalry with Black Star early in the story despite his age,^{[ch. 0b]} and dies in battle against him during DWMA's raid against Arachnophobia, leaving Angela to be taken into DWMA's custody to prevent her from becoming an enemy. In the anime adaptation, however, he survives the battle and leaves Arachnophobia together with Angela to become a DWMA teacher.^{ep. 51}

=== Book of Eibon ===
The Book of Eibon (エイボンの書, Eibon no Sho) is a grimoire written by Eibon that contains all of the wizard's written knowledge. The book contains blueprints for Eibon's demon tools, as well as a pocket universe modelled after the book's seven chapters, each based on one of the seven deadly sins. There is also an eighth hidden chapter, where a shadowy being that was one of the Great Old Ones resides due to his corruptive madness wavelength. Also residing within this world is a mechanical being created by Eibon called the Table of Contents (目次, Mokuji), which represents the book's intelligence and aims to spread his creator's knowledge, and the madness that would be caused by it, across the world, making him the third major antagonist in the series.^{[ch. 82]}

==== Noah ====
Noah (ノア, Noa) is the collective name of a group of artificial beings created by the Table of Contents to assist in the dispersal of Eibon's knowledge. The characters are modeled after Grimoire (グリモア, Gurimoa), a character designed by Atsushi Ohkubo for the video game Soul Eater: Monotone Princess. Each "Noah" is a personification of a sin-themed chapter from the Book of Eibon, each created to replace the previous one that was killed. Noah is served by a young man named Gopher (ゴフェル, Goferu), who worships Noah fanatically and envies anyone who has his master's attention. Like Maka, Gopher possesses a Grigori soul that allows him to fly.^{[ch. 63]}

The first Noah introduced—who represents the sin greed—aims to collect everything in the world, from artifacts to living things, and store them inside the dimension within the book, going as far as defying his creator's orders to satisfy his desires, which result from his specified duties of "having Greed" and "obtaining Brew"^{[ch. 82]}. Ultimately, Noah's reason for aiding Asura is only to add him to his collection once the kishin regains his strength. During Arachnophobia's fall, using the Book of Eibon to summon various monsters sealed within its pages, Noah collects Kid. However, Kid's friends venture into the Book of Eibon to save him and destroy Noah in the process.^{[ch. 81]} An aggressive Noah representing wrath is created soon after and attempts to capture Asura with Gopher's aid as they venture to the moon.^{[ch. 82]} However, as Asura is absorbed by the child, Noah is defeated by Crona who ejects him and his other "brothers" from the absorbed Book of Eibon.

== DWMA ==
Death Weapon Meister Academy (死神武器職人専門学校, Shinigami Buki Shokunin Senmon Gakkō)—called DWMA (死武専, Shibusen) for short—is an international organization founded and headed by Shinigami, the Grim Reaper, to preserve world order and prevent the birth of another kishin after Asura. Its main headquarters in the fictional Death City in Nevada, United States serves as a training facility for young meisters and weapons to hone their powers.

=== Shinigami ===
Voiced by: Ryūsuke Ōbayashi (drama CD), Rikiya Koyama (anime)^{ep. 1} (Japanese); John Swasey^{ep. 1} (English)

Shinigami (死神), also known as Death (デス, Desu)^{[ch. 31]} and named "Lord Death" in the English anime dub and Perfect Edition translation, is the headmaster of Death Weapon Meister Academy and father to both Asura and Death the Kid. The prequel series Fire Force reveals Shinigami's true name as God (神, Kami) and was created by Shinra Kusukabe as a tangible deity for humanity to interact with after rebooting the previous world. He is the personification of madness through order, reflected by his desire to maintain peace in the world and his aversion towards chaos.^{[ch. 72]} However, though he could render humanity into mindless drones due to being able to rewrite reality on a whim, Shinigami allows them to keep their free will. He is also the former leader of the Great Old Ones prior to sealing away his apprentice and first child Asura eight centuries ago who had become a kishin, binding his own soul around Death City to keep Asura imprisoned underground. Unable to leave the city as a result, Shinigami creates DWMA to train meisters and weapons to prevent more kishin from surfacing, and to create death scythes to help him maintain the peace.^{[ch. 16]} As headmaster, Shinigami normally resides in a special chamber in DWMA building called the Death Room, which others can contact through mirrors and reflective objects.^{[ch. 0a]}

While more menacing in his earlier days, Shinigami alters his appearance into a more cartoonish form and acting eccentric to appease his younger students who were frightened of his true form.^{[ch. 22]} Some aspects of his actual form remain, like his large white hands that now resemble foam hands, which he uses to perform a karate chop as a form of discipline for those who act out of hand.^{[ch. 0a]} As a grim reaper, he prefers scythe-type weapons and makes Spirit, Maka's father, his primary death scythe.^{[ch. 23]} Shinigami also raises his second child Death the Kid, whom he created in Shinra's image, to be his heir and not end up like Asura. Though knowing that he would die once Kid connects his Lines of Sanzu, Shinigami accepts his fate and perishes upon Kid's ascension during his fight against Asura.^{[ch. 53, 111]}

=== Death scythes ===
Death scythes (デスサイズス, desu saizusu) are the most powerful form of weapons in Soul Eater, and a title given to weapons worthy of being wielded by Shinigami. The creation of a death scythe is one of the goals that DWMA students must accomplish, which can only be done by slaying and collecting the souls of 99 evil humans and one witch in that order, or else the souls they collect will be confiscated, forcing them to start over.^{[ch. 0a]} A total of eight death scythes are given jurisdiction of a particular world region to help maintain order.^{[ch. 23]} As the series draws to a close, with Death the Kid establishing a truce with the witches, Soul becomes the last death scythe to be created.

==== Spirit Albarn ====
Voiced by: Hiroaki Hirata (drama CD), Tōru Ōkawa (anime)^{ep. 1} (Japanese); Vic Mignogna^{ep. 1} (English)

Spirit Albarn (スピリット=アルバーン, Supiritto Arubān), also named Death Scythe (デスサイズ, Desu Saizu), is Maka's father and the sole death scythe resident to DWMA at the start of the series, with jurisdiction over North America. His weapon form is a scythe with a black blade and a cross-shaped handle.^{[ch. 5]} Originally partnered to Franken Stein, Spirit becomes a death scythe with the aid of his second meister, Maka's mother. However, due to his lecherous behaviour, Spirit ends up being divorced and thus loses Maka's respect, which he desperately tries to regain.^{[ch. 0a]} He acts primarily as a consort for Shinigami before being reassigned as Stein's partner after he is hired as a teacher at DWMA at the start of the series.^{[ch. 5]} However, when he is unable to assist Shinigami battle Asura due to helping Stein defeat Medusa, Spirit is assigned back to being Shinigami's weapon.^{[ch. 18, 23]} Sent to the moon with the others, Spirit comes to the aid of Maka during her fight with Crona, as their familial ties make them an effective team against Crona's Soul Resonance negating abilities.^{[ch. 106]} In the anime, Shinigami wields Spirit in his second battle with Asura.

==== Marie Mjolnir ====
Voiced by: Chieko Honda (Japanese); Colleen Clinkenbeard (English)^{ep. 25}^{ep. 25}

Marie Mjolnir (マリー・ミョルニル, Marī Myoruniru) is the death scythe with jurisdiction over Oceania. Her weapon form differs between the manga and anime: in the manga, she takes the form of a small black hammer that can transform into a tonfa, the length of which increases with her wielder's soul wavelength;^{[ch. 61]} in the anime, her weapon form is a large grey tonfa by default.^{ep. 45} She wears an eyepatch covering her left eye adorned with a lightning-bolt-shaped symbol that is present on her weapon form. She is carefree and absent-minded, and easily gets lost in the basement of DWMA with her poor sense of direction.^{[ch. 24]} She is also lovelorn, having gone through a string of failed relationships with people such as Joe "B.J." Buttataki, and desperately wishes to get married. She chooses to oversee Oceania for the light workload provided by the job, believing it would allow her to focus on settling down with a boyfriend.^{[ch. 23]}

Her soul wavelength has a soothing influence on those inflicted with madness; because of this, she replaces Spirit as Stein's weapon partner.^{[ch. 23]} Medusa takes advantage of this by forcing Crona to secretly place a magic snake inside a cup of tea that she drinks, causing her to unknowingly worsen Stein's madness.^{[ch. 32]} However, she later removes the snake on her own after B.J. discovers it.^{[ch. 38]} Following B.J.'s murder, Marie travels with Stein to find the culprit, eventually learning it to be Justin Law,^{[ch. 61]} whom they eventually kill during DWMA's assault on the moon. In the final chapter, she and Stein reveal that they are expecting a child together, although Marie is worried about Stein's dissecting tendencies.

In the anime adaptation, Marie fails to discover the snake inside her body until after it causes Stein to run away from DWMA and join Medusa.^{ep. 41} Determined to rescue Stein, she temporarily leaves DWMA to avoid the non-aggression pact between the school and Medusa, accompanying Crona in a strained partnership to defeat Medusa.^{ep. 44} After she restores Stein's sanity with her anti-demon wavelength and Medusa is defeated by Maka, she reconciles with Crona and returns to DWMA.^{ep. 49}

==== Azusa Yumi ====
Voiced by: Yukana (Japanese); Brina Palencia (English)^{ep. 25}^{ep. 25}

Azusa Yumi (弓 梓, Yumi Azusa; translated as "Yumi Azusa" in the Funimation dub) is the death scythe in charge of Eastern Asia. She was the president of her class as a DWMA student, often scolding Spirit for flirting and Stein for his experiments, and treats others like children even as an adult.^{[ch. 23]} Her weapon form is a crossbow fitted with a rifle scope that compresses and fires her meister's soul wavelength as ammunition. Her high accuracy allows her to shoot a target up to 10 km away with a 1 mm margin of error. She is very analytical in battle, using a clairvoyant ability that allows her to synchronize with another person and see through their eyes, form maps of areas, calculate distances, and copy visual data at extreme speeds.^{[ch. 25]}

==== Justin Law ====
Voiced by: Yoshinori Fujita (Japanese); Eric Vale (English)^{ep. 25}^{ep. 25}

Justin Law (ジャスティン=ロウ, Jasutin Rō) is the death scythe in charge of Europe. He dresses in the garb of a Catholic priest, and worships Shinigami as his god.^{[ch. 23]} He constantly listens to blaring music through earphones, which blocks his hearing, though he is capable of understanding others through lip reading. He takes the form of a guillotine, and is capable of fighting without a meister partner by transforming his arms and parts of his lower body into blades and the frame of his weapon form, and increasing his own soul wavelength through prayer. He is noted by other characters for having turned himself into a death scythe on his own at the age of thirteen, becoming the youngest weapon student at DWMA to become a death scythe.^{[ch. 26]}

Exclusively in the manga storyline, Justin is found to have been driven insane by Asura's madness wavelength, causing him to replace Shinigami with the kishin as his god.^{[ch. 61]} He defects from DWMA after murdering Joe Buttataki and framing Stein for it, and briefly joins forces with Noah until he finds Asura on the moon.^{[ch. 80]} He battles twice with his former friend Tezca Tlipoca, who burns and deforms the left half of his face in their second battle.^{[ch. 86]} He participates in the battle between DWMA and Asura as one of the kishin's minions,^{[ch. 91]} and is later killed by Stein and Marie.^{[ch. 96]}

==== Tezca Tlipoca ====
Tezca Tlipoca (テスカ・トリポカ, Tesuka Toripoka) is the death scythe with jurisdiction over South America. He is a man who wears an oversized mask that completely covers his head. His masks are shaped like different animal heads, such as a bear and a mouse. His weapon form is a mirror that is attachable to his meister's leg and can create illusions, such as an exact duplicate of whoever looks at him. He also has the power to absorb sunlight and fire it back at others as an incinerating beam. His meister partner is a monkey named Enrique (猿里華, Enrike), who speaks through unintelligible growling noises that only Tezca can understand. Tezca is an old friend of Justin Law, and is devastated by his betrayal.^{[ch. 67]} Against Shinigami's orders, he fakes his own death to follow Justin in an attempt to bring him back to his senses, only to be mortally wounded in the ensuing fight with Justin.^{[ch. 86]} However, his soul survives and he is able to communicate with others by appearing in mirrors.^{[ch. 87]}

==== Tsar Pushka ====
Tsar Pushka (ツァーリ・プーシュカ, Tsāri Pūshuka) is the death scythe in charge of Russia and possesses the same anti-demon wavelength as Maka Albarn. His weapon form is a small cannon that attaches itself to his meister's leg and launches an oversized cannonball. He can transform his head alone into a cannonball attached to his back with a cable, allowing him to swing and retract it at will. His meister is Feodor (フョードル, Fyōdoru), who can use a fighting style resembling the Cossack dance.^{[ch. 82,83]} Both Tsar and Feodor are stationed in Ukraine, where they are killed in battle against Crona.^{[ch. 87]}

==== Dengu Dinga and Jinn Galland ====
Dengu Dinga (デング・ディンガ) and Jinn Galland (ジン・ガラン, Jin Garan) are the death scythes with jurisdiction over Western Asia and Africa, respectively, introduced in the story as participants in the battle against Asura and his minions.^{[ch. 90]} Dengu's weapon form, called a "rainbow axe", is a single-handed hatchet that draws a rainbow arc when swung by his meister, Alexandre (アレクサンドル, Arekusandoru).^{[ch. 91]} Jinn takes the form of an oil lamp that is wielded by his meister, Zubaidah (ズバイダ, Zubaida), and has the power to transform into a jinn-like creature that emerges from the nozzle of his own weapon form.^{[ch. 92]}

=== Staff ===
==== Franken Stein ====
Voiced by: Mitsuru Miyamoto (drama CD), Yūya Uchida (anime)^{ep. 4}, Tomoe Hanba (young) (Japanese); Chuck Huber^{ep. 4}, Chris Burnett (young) (English)

Franken Stein (フランケン・シュタイン, Furanken Shutain) is a mad scientist hired to work as a teacher at DWMA early in the story. He views everything in the world as a specimen to be experimented on, including himself. He has a large screw sticking through the side of his head which he is seen frequently turning. His skin and clothes are interweaved with stitches. He normally serves as a kindly father figure to his students, though he suffers from chronic bouts of madness that compel him to try and dissect anything in sight. Other than being a scientist, Stein is considered to be the most powerful meister to ever graduate from DWMA.^{[ch. 1]} He uses his Soul Perception ability to read his opponents' souls and use the data he acquires against them. He works well with many weapon partners, including his childhood partner and Shinigami's current weapon, Spirit—whom he experimented on in his sleep—and his old flame, Marie Mjolnir.^{[ch. 23]} Even without a weapon, Stein is a master martial artist and can perform potent attacks with his soul wavelength alone.^{[ch. 2]}

Following Asura's resurrection, Stein's insanity worsens under the effects of the kishin's spreading madness wavelength to the point where Marie is assigned by Shinigami to be his weapon, her soothing soul wavelength quelling his insanity.^{[ch. 23]} However, he falls victim to Medusa's plans after she has Crona plant a magical snake inside Marie that worsens Stein's condition even more,^{[ch. 32]} though the snake is discovered by Joe Buttataki and removed.^{[ch. 38]} He is later framed for Joe's murder, but his companions refuse to believe he is the killer and allow him to evade arrest,^{[ch. 39]} eventually leading him to track down the true culprit, Justin Law.^{[ch. 61]} He is assigned as one of the participants in the battle between DWMA and Asura on the moon, where his madness is increased to such extremes that he begins to exhibit behavior not unlike that of a kishin.

In the anime adaptation, the snake in Marie's body is left undiscovered, driving Stein completely insane and causing him to defect to Medusa's side.^{ep. 41} He is later rescued by Maka, Crona, and Marie, the last of whom returns him to normal with her soul wavelength.^{ep. 45}

==== Sid Barrett ====
Voiced by: Susumu Akagi (drama CD), Masafumi Kimura (anime)^{ep. 3} (Japanese); Kent Williams^{ep. 3} (English)

Sid Barrett (死人・バレット, Shido Baretto) is a DWMA teacher and meister who is fatally stabbed in the head with a miniature Statue of Liberty and revived as a zombie by Franken Stein at the beginning of the story as part of a remedial lesson for Maka, Soul, Black Star, and Tsubaki.^{[ch. 1,2]} His name is a pun on the words 死, meaning "dead", and 人, meaning "person".^{[vol. 1]} He frequently refers to himself as "the kind of man he was" when he was alive, despite behaving exactly the same way as if he had never been killed. He always wears a hat or headband to cover the hole left in his head when he was killed. He is shown not to like his current appearance as shown when Crona was frightened of him. This saddened him and made him wish he never came back to life. He is a surrogate father to Black Star, who he had spared and taken in as an infant during DWMA's extermination of the Star Clan.^{[ch. 57]} He employs ninja-like skills in battle, using his powers as a zombie to instantaneously burrow underground and surprise his opponent. His weapon partner, Mira Naigus (ミーラ・ナイグス, Mīra Naigusu; spelled as "Mila Naigus" in the Funimation dub), takes the form of a combat knife and specializes in setting traps such as tripwires and explosives.^{[ch. 35]} Naigus also acts as DWMA's physical education teacher,^{[ch. 45]} and replaces Medusa as the school nurse.^{[ch. 27]}

==== Joe Buttataki ====
Voiced by: Atsushi Ono (Japanese); Jason Douglas (English)^{ep. 37}^{ep. 37}

Joe Buttataki (ブッ叩き・ジョー, Buttataki Jō), nicknamed "B.J." ("J.B." in the Funimation anime dub), is a character introduced following the first major battle between DWMA and Arachnophobia, and thus his role completely differs between the diverging storylines of the manga and its anime adaptation. In the manga, he is a member of DWMA's internal affairs division from Oceania who specializes in lie detection through his highly developed Soul Perception ability, called Super Soul Perception, which allows him to read the souls of witches even while they disguise themselves with Soul Protect.^{[ch. 38]} He has a past romance with Marie Mjolnir, who he breaks up with prior to the start of the story out of concern that his Soul Perception would disrupt their relationship. He is called to Death City to help uncover an enemy mole within DWMA, revealed to be Justin Law, who determines his Soul Perception to be a threat to Asura and murders him.^{[ch. 39,62]} In the anime, Joe is a member of DWMA's research and development division, again from Oceania, who is summoned to build a machine out of the demon tools created by Eibon that allows Shinigami to transform all of Death City into a giant mecha and capture Asura.^{ep. 46} Both versions of the character share a fondness for coffee.^{[ch. 38]}^{ep. 38}

=== Students ===
The students of DWMA are divided into two separate classes—the Normally Overcome Target (NOT) class, which is made up of 90% of the school's students and serves to teach them how to control their powers and adapt to everyday life; and the Especially Advanced Talent (EAT) class, in which the remaining 10% are trained as combatants. The main protagonists of Soul Eater attend the school's EAT class, while the spin-off manga Soul Eater Not! focuses on students from the NOT class. Later in the main story, a unit of elite meister and weapon students called Spartoi (スパルトイ, Suparutoi)—also called the DWMA Junior Elite Corps (死武専若手精鋭部隊, Shibusen Wakate Seiei Butai)—is formed by the main protagonists in addition to students Ox Ford, Kilik Rung, and Kim Diehl and their weapon partners.^{[ch. 62]}

==== Ox Ford and Harvar ====
Ox: Voiced by: Hiroyuki Yoshino (Japanese); Jessie James Grelle (English)^{ep. 14}^{ep. 14}
Harvar: Voiced by: Wataru Hatano (Japanese); Scott Freeman (English)

Ox Ford (オックス・フォード, Okkusu Fōdo) is a meister and honors student who attends DWMA's EAT class. He is a bookworm who takes his studies very seriously, but considers himself to be a great warrior in battle, calling himself the "Great General Lightning King". His weapon partner is Harvar D. Éclair (ハーバー・ド・エクレール, Hābā Do Ekurēru), who wears a red visor and takes the form of a spear with a head shaped like a lightning bolt, allowing him to conjure electricity. Ox has a shaved head with two spikes of hair on the sides of his head, which he takes great pride in. He has a mostly one-sided love for Kim Diehl, and is instrumental in persuading her to return to DWMA after she defects and is brainwashed into serving Arachnophobia, going as far as ripping out his hair to prove his loyalty to her, and growing out a full head of hair at her request. Their names are likely puns on the universities Oxford and Harvard, respectively.

==== Kilik Rung ====
Voiced by: Kenichi Suzumura (Japanese); Joel McDonald (English)^{ep. 18}^{ep. 18}

Kilik Rung (キリク・ルング, Kiriku Rungu) is an EAT class meister whose weapon partners, the young children Pot of Fire (ポット・オブ・ファイア, Potto obu Faia) and Pot of Thunder (ポット・オブ・サンダー, Potto obu Sandā), take the form of a pair of large gauntlets. Fire and Thunder are twin brother and sister, respectively, who never speak but have the ability to communicate with nature and sense danger. As per his weapons' namesakes, Kilik is able to produce fire and electricity from the Pots while wielding them, allowing him to collaborate well with Ox Ford and Kim Diehl, who he is close friends with. In the anime, he is good friends with Black Star, who often gets Kilik to partner with him during his fights, and is mentioned to be one of the top three fighters at the school in terms of raw power by Hero.

==== Kim Diehl and Jacqueline O'Lantern Dupré ====
Kim: Voiced by: Chiwa Saitō (Japanese); Caitlin Glass (English)^{ep. 32}^{ep. 32}
Jacqueline: Voiced by: Kanae Oki (Japanese); Jad Saxton (English)

Kim Diehl (キム・ディール, Kimu Dīru) is an EAT class meister and partner of Jacqueline O'Lantern Dupré (ジャクリーン・オー・ランタン・デュプレ, Jakurīn Ō Rantan Dyupure), nicknamed Jackie (ジャッキー, Jakkī), who takes the form of a square hand lantern that Kim wields like a flamethrower in battle, and can extend her handle to serve as an airborne mode of transportation. Kim has a tendency to bully fellow students by charging them money while performing tasks for them. She is the object of fellow student Ox Ford's affections, though she is often annoyed by his romantic advances. She is later revealed to be a tanuki witch who possesses regenerative powers, allowing her to heal both herself and others when injured, going against the typically destructive nature of other witches. In Soul Eater Not!, Kim is shown to befriend Jacqueline, one of her bully victims (who has a secret crush on Kim), after the latter discovers her witch identity and helps keep it a secret. In the main series manga, Kim's identity is exposed by Medusa, causing her and Jacqueline flee DWMA together and reluctantly join Arachnophobia for protection. They are brainwashed into serving the organization, but are later returned to normal by Ox and Harvar and allowed to return to DWMA.

==== Akane Hoshi and Clay Sizemore ====
Akane: Voiced by: Takahiro Sakurai (Japanese); Ian Sinclair (English)
Clay: Voiced by: Seiichirō Yamashita (Japanese); Bryce Papenbrook (English)

Akane Hoshi (星☆茜, Hoshi Akane; stylized as "Akane☆Hoshi") is a meister and DWMA student introduced in Soul Eater Not! as a member of the NOT class; his weapon partner is Clay Sizemore (クレイ・サイズモア, Kurei Saizumoa), who takes the form of a longsword. Akane originates from a family who shares lineage to Star Clan, whom were eradicated by DWMA. His left eye has a star-shaped mark over its iris as a sign of his lineage, which he covers with his hair fringes. In Soul Eater Not!, it is revealed that they are actually graduates of the EAT class assigned to pose as NOT students in order to secretly protect Princess Anastasia Yngling, who has been attending the NOT class under the alias Anya Hepburn. Akane and Clay appear in the main storyline as members of DWMA's personal Central Intelligence Agency, and participate in the battle on the moon to help defeat Asura and his minions.^{[ch. 90]}

== Other characters ==
=== Great Old Ones ===
The Great Old Ones (グレート・オールド・ワン, Gurēto Ōrudo Wan; alternatively written as 旧支配者, meaning "Old Ruler") are five immortal beings with Shinigami and Asura among its members. These beings each embody a particular emotion or state of being that invokes madness within other people.^{[ch. 72]} Joined by Vajra and two unknown figures, the Great Old Ones formed the Eight Grim Reaper Legions (死神八武衆, Shinigami Hachi Bushū; translated as "Death's Eight Guardians" in the Funimation dub) to maintain order in the world before the construction of DWMA 800 years prior to the start of the series.^{[ch. 16]} Asura's actions resulted in the deaths of Vajra and the other two members before he was sealed with the four remaining Great Old Ones going their separate ways.

==== Excalibur ====
Voiced by: Takehito Koyasu (Japanese); Troy Baker (English)^{ep. 9}^{ep. 9}

Excalibur (エクスカリバー, Ekusukaribā), known as the Holy Sword (聖剣, Seiken), is the most powerful weapon in the Soul Eater series. He normally resides in a cavern shrine in Great Britain that is home to fairies.^{[ch. 6]} The prequel series Fire Force reveals that Excalibur was originally the main weapon wielded by Arthur Boyle. The sword was instilled with life as a result of his owner's delusions affected by the Second Cataclysm that led to the world's reboot into the one Soul Eater takes place on. Excalibur is also suggested to be the Great Old One who is the embodiment of madness through rage.^{[ch. 77]} His weapon form is a single-handed sword of intricate design, while his alternate form is a short, cartoonish anteater creature with a plague mask-like face and dressed in a white suit and top hat. Though he can automatically resonate his soul with anyone, giving them various god-like powers like flight and ripping holes in time and space, Excalibur is extremely obnoxious and egotistical to the point of alienating potential meisters within minutes in various ways such as calling them "fools" to cut them off during a discussion.^{ep. 17} As a result, only one who can withstand Excalibur's numerous flaws can effectively use him.

==== Eibon ====
Voiced by: Yasuyuki Kase (Japanese); Christopher Sabat (English)^{ep. 43}^{ep. 43}

Eibon (エイボン) is the physical embodiment of madness through knowledge.^{[ch. 72]} He is the author of the Book of Eibon, which contains blueprints of several other artifacts called demon tools (魔道具, madōgu; "magic tools" in the Funimation dub) that DWMA and Arachnophobia attempt to utilize.^{[ch. 31]} The most powerful of these demon tools is "Brew", a small mechanical cube that possesses the power to drastically increase the soul wavelength of anyone who holds it. In the anime adaptation, Eibon allied with Arachne 800 years in the past to cure his lover from a fatal illness, but Eibon failed and resurfaced years later to transform himself into a demon tool used to unlock Brew as penance.^{ep. 46}

==== Great Old One of Power ====
The Great Old One that embodies madness through power has the appearance of a black, amorphous blob. His madness wavelength has those it afflicts reveal their true desires as the madness magnifies it. As a consequence of its power, this being is responsible for Asura becoming the kishin and goes into solitude within the Book of Eibon after Noah collected it. From its prison, the being resolves to use its madness wavelength to test those worthy to take over when the Great Old Ones are all gone. The being puts Black Star and Death the Kid through its test by having them battle each other, deeming their generation ideal successors when they reach a mutual conclusion of what kind of world to create without causing misery through power.^{[ch. 80]}

=== Blair ===
Voiced by: Yuko Sasamoto (drama CD), Emiri Katō (anime)^{ep. 1} (Japanese); Leah Clark^{ep. 1} (English)

Blair (ブレア, Burea) is a black cat with exceptionally strong magic powers, including the power to transform into a young, alluring human woman among other spells, such as conjuring pumpkin-shaped explosions and summoning a giant flying pumpkin for transportation. Her name is derived from The Blair Witch Project.^{[vol. 1]} She is mistaken for a witch by Maka and Soul at the beginning of the story because of her witch-based clothing, such as her pointed hat, forcing them to restart their soul collection after they collect her soul, which she survives since cats have nine souls.^{[ch. 0a]} She has a flirtatious relationship with Soul and moves in with him and Maka for this reason, much to Soul's dismay and Maka's jealousy.^{[ch. 1]} Despite this, the two are able to generally tolerate her presence, though Soul suffers from nosebleeds whenever he sees her doing something risqué.^{[ch. 9]}

=== Little ogre ===
Voiced by: Hōchū Ōtsuka (Japanese); Barry Yandell (English)^{ep. 12}^{ep. 12}

The little ogre (小さな鬼, chiisana oni; translated as "little demon" in the Funimation dub) is a being who appears in Soul's subconscious after he is infected by Ragnarok's black blood, taking the form of a small, red oni in a black double-breasted suit.^{[ch. 9]} He periodically tempts Soul through his interests in music with power that can only be obtained through the black blood, hoping to spread its influence to others.^{[ch. 18]} While Soul usually accepts his offers in desperate situations, the ogre is ignored for the most part.

In the anime adaptation, the ogre is described as being Soul's alter ego created by the black blood. He almost succeeds in taking control of Soul during the final battle against Asura, but is thwarted when Maka salvages what remains of Soul's mind using her Anti-Demon Wavelength. The ogre is then swallowed whole by Soul as a mock-gesture of accepting the ogre as a part of himself.^{ep. 50}

=== Masamune ===
Voiced by: Hiroshi Tsuchida, Hiro Shimono (young) (Japanese); Kyle Hebert, Chris Burnett (young) (English)^{ep. 10}^{ep. 10}

Masamune (マサムネ) is Tsubaki's older brother who is driven mad with jealousy for his sister inheriting most of their family's weapon forms while he can only assume the form of a katana. Gaining infamy as the Uncanny Sword (妖刀, Yōtō; translated as "Enchanted Sword" in the Funimation dub), with his blade blackened over time, Masamune devours both the souls of his victims and those of the people he subjugates to his will once they outlive their usefulness.^{[ch. 7]} Masamune's actions spur Tsubaki into joining DWMA to stop him from becoming a kishin. Once obtaining Masamune in his weapon form, Tsubaki engages her brother in a metaphysical battle where she manages to defeat him and consume his soul, gaining his Uncanny Sword form.^{[ch. 8]}
