= Aine =

Aine may refer to:

- Áine, Irish goddess of summer, wealth and sovereignty
- Áine (given name), an Irish female given name
- Aine, Dahanu, a village in Maharashtra, India
- Hugo Aine, French footballer
- Princess Aine, a character in Mark Millar's Empress and Big Game
