= Áine (given name) =

- Pronunciation: [ˈaːnʲə]
- Gender: Feminine
- Language: Irish

Origin
- Meaning: Radiance
- Region of origin: Ireland

Áine (Irish pronunciation: [ˈaːnʲə]) is an Irish language feminine given name. It means "radiance" and is the name of the Irish Celtic goddess of wealth and summer Áine.

Notable people with this given name include:

== Arts and entertainment ==
- Áine Ní Cheanainn, headmistress, co-founder of the film society Cumann Scannán na nÓg
- Áine Rose Daly, British actor and singer
- Áine Furey, Irish singer (with Bohinta)
- Áine Ní Ghlinn, Irish journalist, poet, playwright, and children's writer
- Áine Greaney (born c. 1962), Irish writer and editor
- Áine Hensey, historian, Irish radio broadcaster and producer of Irish music programmes
- Áine Lawlor (born 1965), Irish radio broadcaster
- Áine Minogue (born 1977), Irish harpist
- Áine Ní Mhuirí, Irish actress
- Áine O'Dwyer, Irish experimental musician (fl. 21st century)
- Áine Phillips, Irish performance artist

== Politics ==
- Áine Brady (born 1954), teacher and Irish Fianna Fáil politician
- Áine Ceannt (1880–1954), Irish revolutionary
- Áine Ní Chonaill (born 1952), Irish anti-immigration activist
- Áine Collins (born 1969), Irish Fine Gael politician
- Áine Ní Fhoghludha (1880–1932), Irish nationalist and writer in the Irish language
- Áine Hardiman (1926–2013), Irish nun and anti-apartheid activist in South Africa
- Áine Kelly-Costello (born 1995), New Zealand climate justice and disability rights campaigner, Paralympic swimmer
- Áine Murphy, Northern Irish Sinn Féin politician

== Royalty ==
- Áine Ní Murchadha, Princess of Leinster, fl. 1169
- Áine Ní Duinn Sleibhe, Queen of Airgíalla, died 1171
- Áine Ní Donnchada, Queen of Breifne, died 1386
- Áine Ní Eochagain, Queen of Fermanagh, died 1466

== Sport ==
- Áine Codd, camogie player (Co. Wexford)
- Áine Kelly-Costello (born 1995), New Zealand climate justice and disability rights campaigner, Paralympic swimmer
- Áine Lyng (born 1988), camogie player (Co. Waterford)
- Áine O'Gorman (born 1989), Irish association footballer
- Áine Wall (born 1970), ladies' Gaelic football player

== Other fields ==
- Áine Brazil, Irish engineer
- Áine Hyland (born 1942), Irish academic (professor of education)

== See also ==
- List of Irish-language given names
