= Anya (disambiguation) =

Anya is a feminine given name.

Anya may also refer to:

== Arts and entertainment ==
=== Fictional characters ===
- Anya (Anastasia), the title character of 1997 animated film Anastasia
- Anya (Star Trek), a character in the Star Trek: The Next Generation episode "The Dauphin"
- Anya, a character in The 100

=== Works ===
- Anya (musical), a 1965 Broadway musical
- Anya (2019 film), a science fiction film
- Anya (2022 film), an Indian crime film
- "Anya", a song by Deep Purple from the 1993 album The Battle Rages On...

== People ==
- Anya, ring name of Anna Bogomazova (born 1990), Russian wrestler
- Anya Chalotra (born 1996 or 1997), English actress
- Ikechi Anya (born 1988), Scottish footballer

== Places ==
- Anya, Artesa de Segre, Catalonia, Spain
- Anya, the modern site in Asian Turkey of Anaea, an ancient city, former bishopric, and titular see

== Other uses ==
- Anya potato, a variety of potato

== See also ==
- Ania (disambiguation)
- Enya (disambiguation)
- Anaya (disambiguation)
- Anyah (Tsirimaharo Ny Aina Rafenomanantsoa, born 1984), Malagasy politician and musician
