= Ania =

Ania may refer to:

- Ania, a variant of given name Anya
  - Ania (singer) (born 1981), Polish singer and composer
- Ania (plant), genus of terrestrial orchids
- Ania (moth), genus of geometer moths
- Kuşadası, district of Aydın Province, Turkey, formerly known as Ania

== See also ==
- Anya (disambiguation)
