= Enya (disambiguation) =

Enya (born 1961) is an Irish vocalist, instrumentalist and composer.

Enya may also refer to:

- Enya (album), 1987 album by Enya
- 6433 Enya, an asteroid
- Enya language, a language spoken in the Democratic Republic of the Congo

== See also ==
- Anya (disambiguation)
- Enye (Ñ), a letter of the Latin alphabet
