= Soul Eater Not! =

Japanese manga series

- First tankōbon volume cover, featuring (from left to right) Anya Hepburn, Tsugumi Harudori and Meme Tatane

ソウルイーターノット! (Sōru Ītā Notto!)
- Genre: Comedy; Dark fantasy; Slice of life
- Manga
- Written by: Atsushi Ohkubo
- Published by: Square Enix
- English publisher: NA: Yen Press
- Magazine: Monthly Shōnen Gangan
- Original run: January 12, 2011 – November 12, 2014
- Volumes: 5
- Anime television series
- Directed by: Masakazu Hashimoto
- Written by: Masakazu Hashimoto
- Music by: Asami Tachibana; Yuki Hayashi
- Studio: Bones
- Licensed by: Crunchyroll
- Original network: TV Tokyo
- Original run: April 9, 2014 – July 3, 2014
- Episodes: 12
- icon

Soul Eater Not! (Japanese: ソウルイーターノット!, Hepburn: Sōru Ītā Notto!) is a Japanese manga series written and illustrated by Atsushi Ohkubo. It is a spin-off to Ohkubo's Soul Eater manga series, taking place prior to the events of the manga. It was serialized in Square Enix's Monthly Shōnen Gangan magazine from January 2011 to November 2014. A 12-episode anime television series adaptation by Bones aired on TV Tokyo between April and July 2014 and was simulcast by Funimation in North America.

== Plot ==
The Death Weapon Meister Academy (DWMA) is a special institution for humans who are born with the power to turn into weapons and the wielders of these weapons, called meisters. While the students of the EAT (Especially Advantaged Talent) class train themselves to become warriors of justice, the NOT (Normally Overcome Target) class is for those who just want to control their powers with the intent to not become a threat to others and to themselves. Tsugumi Harudori is a weapon who takes part in the NOT class and befriends two weapon meisters, Meme Tatane and Anya Hepburn, becoming indecisive about which one of them to choose as her partner. The series follows the daily lives of Tsugumi and her friends as they learn the ropes of the DWMA and have occasional encounters with the characters of the main series.

== Media ==
=== Manga ===
Soul Eater Not! was serialized in Square Enix's shōnen manga magazine Monthly Shōnen Gangan from January 12, 2011, to November 12, 2014. Square Enix published five tankōbon volumes between September 22, 2011, and December 22, 2015. Square Enix republished the series in three kanzenban volumes, with the first two released on July 17, 2020, and the third one on September 17 of that same year.

The series is licensed in North America by Yen Press and was simultaneously released in English alongside its Japanese counterpart. The five volumes were released from July 24, 2012, to July 21, 2015.

==== Volumes ====
No.	Original release date	Original ISBN	English release date	English ISBN
1	September 22, 2011	978-4-7575-3365-3	July 24, 2012	978-0-316-21362-2
2	July 21, 2012	978-4-7575-3660-9	October 30, 2012	978-0-316-22106-1
3	December 12, 2013	978-4-7575-4164-1	July 22, 2014	978-0-316-37666-2
4	April 12, 2014	978-4-7575-4243-3	November 18, 2014	978-0-316-29816-2
5	December 22, 2014	978-4-7575-4499-4	July 21, 2015	978-0-316-30502-0

=== Anime ===
An anime television series adaptation by Bones aired between April 9 and July 3, 2014, on TV Tokyo and its affiliates. (Note: TV Tokyo listed series air dates on Tuesday at 25:40, which is effectively Wednesday at 1:40 a.m. JST.) The opening theme is "Monochrome" by Dancing Dolls, and the ending theme is "Yūgure Happy Go" (夕暮れハッピーゴー; "Evening Happy Go") by Haruka Chisuga, Aoi Yūki, and Saori Hayami.

The series was simulcast by Funimation.

==== Episodes ====
No.	Title	Original release date
1	"Enrolling at the DWMA!" "Shibusen, Nyūgaku!" (死武専、入学！)	April 9, 2014
Upon discovering that she can transform into a weapon, Tsugumi Harudori transfers to the Death Weapon Meister Academy (DWMA) in Death City in order to learn how to control her powers. Whilst struggling to climb the many steps leading up to the DWMA, Tsugumi is helped out by one of the students, Maka Albarn, who encourages her to reach the top, with a beautiful view of the city as her reward. Tsugumi soon arrives at the freshman reception for the DWMA's NOT class, where she makes friends with absent-minded meister Meme Tatane. With the freshmen tasked to find a partner, Maka and her weapon partner, Soul Eater, are brought in to give a demonstration. Following the reception, Tsugumi decides to follow Maka's example and stands up for Meme when she is hit on by delinquents trying to coerce her into being their partner. Noticing the situation, another meister named Anya Hepburn decides to stand up to the delinquents by herself. With some encouragement from her teacher, Sid, Tsugumi manages to find her resolve and transforms into her weapon form, a halberd with a blunt edge, helping Anya to fight off the delinquents. After the fight, both Meme and Anya express their desire to become Tsugumi's partner.
2	"Girls' Dorm à la Carte!" "Joshi Ryō a ra Karuto!" (女子寮あらかると!)	April 16, 2014
Tsugumi, Meme, and Anya are escorted to the girls' dorm by the supervisor, Eternal Feather, who warns them about 'the witch of the girls' dorm'. After the girls move into the dorms and settle into their rooms for the night, Tsugumi finds herself tied up by the housemaster, Misery, who attempts to remodel her with a mallet into her ideal 'Mary' from her favorite romantic novel, but is thwarted by a sleepfighting Meme before being stopped by another DWMA student. The next morning, this girl turns out to be the dorm's 'witch', Kim Diehl, who takes Tsugumi's allowance as payment for her rescue. Meanwhile, Anya has spent her entire allowance, along with her family brooch, on trinkets from the marketplace whilst Meme has misplaced her own allowance. With virtually no money between them for the week, the girls apply for a part-time job at the Deathbucks Caffe, along with two other students from the NOT class, Akane and Clay. After a day of work, Tsugumi uses some of her earnings to buy Anya a new DWMA brooch to replace the one she sold.
3	"The Witch of the Girls' Dorm!" "Joshi Ryō no Majo!" (女子寮の魔女!)	April 23, 2014
Eternal Feather explains to Tsugumi and the others about how Kim got her reputation, including how she received her awkward stage name from her. Meanwhile, Akane and Clay, who were formerly from the advanced EAT class, are tasked by Sid to go up against a group known as the Traitors. The next day, as Anya feels left out from her group, she is attacked by one of the Traitors on her way home, but is saved by the arrival of Tsugumi and Meme, before Akane and Clay manage to force the Traitor to retreat. Later, EAT student Ox Ford gives Tsugumi his allowance to replace the money Kim stole, asking her not to hold anything against her. Upon discovering Anya had received a poisonous scratch from the Traitor, Kim gives her a bandaid that seems to magically heal her, though another EAT student, Jacqueline O'Lantern Dupré, suspects there is more to it than that.
4	"Waver, Run!" "Mayotte, Hashitte!" (迷って, 走って!)	April 30, 2014
Feeling down about not being able to do anything during the Traitor incident, Tsugumi hears from Akane about the reasons meisters come to the DWMA, as well as his own. As Tsugumi becomes a little confused by some seemingly flirtatious words from Akane, not helped by Clay, who tries to cover up their secret mission from her with confusing love diagrams, she briefly runs into Maka again. The next day, as the class takes some fitness exams, Tsugumi starts to feel more inferior about her abilities compared to Meme and Anya, but Akane gives her some encouragement by telling her to focus on her own feelings.
5	"Invitation Fighting!" "Osasoi Faitingu!" (お誘いふぁいてぃんぐ!)	May 7, 2014
Whilst Kim has Tsugumi and the others, along with Jacqueline, help out with cleaning the pool, Sid receives word that the Traitor from earlier, who has been taken into custody, may have been enchanted by a witch. Noticing that Jacqueline has a crush on Kim and wants to become her partner, Tsugumi and the others decide to help her try and befriend Kim, but none of their attempts seem to work out as planned. Later, Jacqueline stumbles across Kim as she uses magic to heal an injured puppy, learning that she is in fact a real witch. As Kim becomes devastated at being found out, stating how she came to the DWMA to escape the world of witches, Jacqueline decides to keep Kim's identity a secret in exchange for treating Tsugumi and the others to ice cream. Thankful, Kim agrees to make Jacqueline her partner.
6	"This is a Real Fight!" "Koko wa Riaru Faito!" (ここはリアルファイト!)	May 14, 2014
Tsugumi and the others get a bad impression from the Thompson sisters, Liz and Patty, who are working at Deathbucks whilst on probation, having spent most of their childhood living on the streets of Brooklyn. When they run into the sisters later that day, Anya prepares to stand against them with Tsugumi, but is outmatched by their ability to both transform into pistols. While Anya and Meme avoid going to the café, Tsugumi keeps going there every day in the hopes of standing up to the sisters and ordering a pilaf. When one of the customers gets upset with Patty for her rude service, Liz attempts to punch him but Tsugumi steps in and takes the hit instead. The next day, after a brief run-in with meister Death the Kid, Tsugumi states how she has come to admire Liz and Patty's strength, also complimenting them on their coolness and beauty. With Tsumugi's friends returning to the café to join her, the Master explains to Liz and Patty how they have no need to be defiant as people in Death City can accept them for who they are. Meanwhile, as Sid, Akane, and Clay go to interview the Traitor suspect, they discover one of the guards has become a Traitor himself and murdered the suspect, leaving a message in blood reading "While you are sleeping, we keep moving."
7	"Nice Day For a Death Bazaar!" "Desu Bazā Biyori!" (デスバザー日和!)	May 21, 2014
Akane and Clay report to Sid that they suspect the culprit behind the Traitor incidents to be a witch named Shaula Gorgon. Meanwhile, Tsugumi and the others get together for a study session at Deathbucks, helping out when the place gets busier, even if only for a brief moment. The next day, the girls check out the Death Bazaar flea market, where Maka and Soul are running a stand together. Whilst taking a break from her own stand, Eternal Feather purchases a strange scorpion-shaped ring from a mysterious woman, who turns out to be Shaula, who uses the ring to put Eternal Feather under her control and make her a Traitor. Eternal Feather transforms her arm into her weapon, an oversized butterfly knife, and starts attacking innocent bystanders. Maka and Soul step in to try to bring her under control. Feeling Eternal Feather would be outmatched by the EAT pair, Shaula commands her to kill herself, causing her to bring her blade against her own neck.
8	"Tsugumi Spiral!" "Tsugumi Supairaru!" (つぐみスパイラル!)	May 28, 2014
Whilst Akane and Clay interview Maka and Soul about the incident, Tsugumi and the others are relieved to find Eternal Feather has survived thanks to the efforts of Dr. Franken Stein, though are none too pleased with his pranks. As Eternal Feather steadily recovers from her injuries, Stein reports his findings to Sid, suggesting she was put under mind control by magic. A few days later, after Eternal Feather is discharged, Jacqueline feels downhearted after Kim suddenly tells her they should break up. That evening, Anya and Meme scold Tsugumi for lacking the resolve to settle on one of them as a meister partner, telling her she needs to make her decision by October 31, Halloween.
9	"Pumpkin Growing!" "Kabocha, Gurōwin!" (カボチャ,グローウィン!)	June 4, 2014
A series of tales that take place whilst the girls are growing pumpkins for Halloween. During the night, Tsugumi and Anya have to deal with Meme's unique sleepwalking, which proves to be a fearsome fighting style similar to drunken boxing, which Meme can only perform whilst asleep or unconscious. On another day, Meme wakes up with a bag full of cash, a sloth, and a missing eyebrow, with no recollection of what led her to this bizarre situation. As Meme's investigation continues to leave her with more questions, she eventually finds the sloth's owner and remembers what happened the day before. Later, Tsugumi finds a bat and catcher's glove and decides to teach Anya and Meme how to play baseball, becoming a bit too invested in it. As Halloween nears and the girls harvest the results of their growing, Tsugumi worries about having to decide between Meme and Anya whilst Shaula prepares to make her move.
10	"The Beginning of the Nightmare!" "Akumu no Hajimari!" (悪夢のはじまり!)	June 11, 2014
Tsugumi becomes upset when she receives a letter from her mother informing her that her dog, Pochi, had gotten involved in an accident, and ends up lashing out at Meme for forgetting things so easily. That night, Tsugumi and Anya follow Meme during one of her sleepwalks, winding up at the hidden research room where they are discovered by Akane and Clay. Meme is taken into custody, as Sid believes that her sleepwalking and forgetfulness may be the result of being under Shaula's hypnosis. As Tsugumi and Anya become conflicted on what to do, they receive a message from Meme asking them to come see her. However, when they break her out, she is revealed to have been possessed by Shaula and escapes. Sid chases after Shaula, who has possessed some of his men, but is outsmarted by her and found dead by the time Tsugumi and the others arrive. Later on, Akane and Clay reveal they were hired as bodyguards for Anya, who is really Princess Anastasia Yngling, ordered with escorting her back home should anything happen to Sid, leaving Tsugumi stunned.
11	"Their Various Resolves!" "Sorezore no Kakugo!" (それぞれの覚悟!)	June 18, 2014
Whilst the rest of Death City celebrate Halloween with a Battle Festival amongst the EAT students, Kim and Jacqueline are tasked with watching over Tsugumi, who had been grounded for her actions. Meanwhile, as Akane and Clay escort Anya towards the airport, the city is suddenly overrun by NOT students turned into Traitors, which the EAT students have to fend off. As Tsugumi states her belief that Anya won't leave the city, mentioning the feelings she sensed from her. Jacqueline, sensing what Tsugumi may be going through, has Kim heal her injuries and lets her go to help her friends. Hitching a ride with Liz and Patty, Tsugumi reunites with Anya, the two resolving to rescue Meme and managing to perform a Soul Resonance, which gives Tsugumi's halberd form wings. Sensing the two's bonds, Akane directs them towards Stein, who admires their resolve and gives them an antidote made from Meme's blood. Following a messenger bat, Tsugumi and Anya soon arrive at the top of a bell tower, where Shaula and Meme await.
12	"Soul Resonance!" "Tamashī no Kyōmei!" (魂の共鳴!)	July 3, 2014
Having spread out Traitors across Death City, Shaula unleashes her magic, making the Traitors more powerful whilst also ordering some of them to kill themselves as she sees fit. Shaula then sends Meme to kill Tsugumi and Anya, with Anya attempting to subdue her to give Tsugumi the chance to administer the antidote. Overcoming her fears, Tsugumi manages to break open Meme's guard and administer the antidote via a kiss. Whilst it does not appear to work at first, Tsugumi puts herself in harm's way to get Meme to remember the times they've spent together, managing to perform a Soul Resonance with her and break her free from Shaula's mind control. Tsugumi then makes the decision to make both Anya and Meme her official partners, believing the three of them can resonate together. Using the remnants of Meme's link to track down Shaula, the girls perform a three-way Soul Resonance to bring out Tsugumi's true form, a winged halberd with a sharp edge, combining all of their strengths to defeat Shaula, returning all of the infected students back to normal. Some time later, after Anya sorts out some royal business and Meme gets a medical check-up, the two return to Tsugumi at DWMA, who has been studying hard in their absence.

== Reception ==
The first three of the manga volumes released by Yen Press are best sellers according to The New York Times.

Anime News Network (ANN) had four editors review the first episode of the anime: Rebecca Silverman expressed intrigue in the series. She praised the character of Tsugumi Harudori for being interesting and introducing the world the story takes place in, concluding by saying that it deserves more episodes to see how it will move forward from that; Carl Kimlinger, although praising Masakazu Hashimoto for directing the series from a different perspective, expressed criticism in the lack of bravado and edge that Takuya Igarashi brought to the original series; Jacob Hope Chapman commented on how comparing it to the original series seemed fair, expressing disdain over the animation and characters for being bland and the overall tone resembling that of K-On!. The fourth reviewer, Theron Martin, gave two different opinions on the episode. He said that the change in tone and different art style will disappoint fans of the original series, while as a stand-alone show it might do better with its overall cutesy charm.

Martin reviewed the complete series in 2015. Despite finding some inconsistency in the setting and some subpar action scenes, Martin gave praise to the main trio's presence, the moe-influenced animation and returning to the series' world as a prequel, concluding that, "Overall, Soul Eater Not! looks pretty good and can be quite pleasingly entertaining, provided that you do not go into it from Soul Eater expecting 'more of the same'. It sells its cute and fun factors well enough to stand on its own while also still throwing plenty of bones to fans of the original series." Fellow ANN editor Gabriella Ekens wrote that the modest moe art style made the series come across as "a low-rent K-On!" with its dodgy facial expressions and the main girls' "loving and supportive" interactions, concluding with: "Despite light action segments, Soul Eater Not! is for fans of slice-of-life moé and no one else. Familiarity with the larger Soul Eater franchise helps but is not required. Just remember – this isn't Soul Eater!, and don't go to it for that." Chris Homer of The Fandom Post critiqued that the prequel's overall slice of life vibe, cutesy moe comedy and the Not! cast will put off fans of the original series but felt that new viewers can enjoy it based on its three leads (highlighting Anya and her development), the various SE cameos and its dramatic final third, concluding that "on its own merit, it's harmless. Nothing spectacular, but nothing terrible – a nice slice of life series which you can just smile through."
