= Kishin =

Kishin may refer to:

== People ==
- Kishin Shinoyama (born 1940), Japanese photographer
- Kishin Kawabata, ring name of Hikaru Kawabata (born 1965), Japanese professional wrestler
- Kishin Liger and Jushin Liger, ring names of Keiichi Yamada (born 1964), Japanese professional wrestler

== Fictional characters ==
- Kishin Alba, a protagonist in Cloverfield/Kishin, a prequel manga to the 2008 film Cloverfield
- Kishin, a term for an evil god in the manga and anime series Soul Eater
- Sagume Kishin, a character in Legacy of Lunatic Kingdom from the video game franchise Touhou Project

== Other uses ==
- Chinkon kishin (鎮魂帰神), a Japanese religious practice
- Kishin Line, a Japanese railway line

== See also ==
- Kishin Corps, a series of light novels, manga and a mecha anime
