= Fire Force =

Japanese manga series and its franchise

- First tankōbon volume cover, featuring Shinra Kusakabe

炎炎ノ消防隊 (En'en no Shōbōtai)
- Genre: Adventure; Dark fantasy; Science fantasy
- Manga
- Written by: Atsushi Ohkubo
- Published by: Kodansha
- English publisher: NA: Kodansha USA
- Imprint: Shōnen Magazine Comics
- Magazine: Weekly Shōnen Magazine
- Original run: September 23, 2015 – February 22, 2022
- Volumes: 34
- Anime television series
- Directed by: Yuki Yase (S1); Tatsuma Minamikawa (S2–3)
- Produced by: Hiroshi Kamei; Chiho Tochikura (S1–2); Du Yi (S1–2); Rina Shinoda (#1–14); Chris Han (#1–14); Maya Fujino (#15–48); Emiko Iijima (#15–48); Hayato Kanno (S3); Yoshiyuki Shioya (S3); Nobuhiko Kurosu (S3); Daijirou Morita (S3)
- Written by: Yamato Haishima (S1); Tatsuma Minamikawa (S2); Sei Tsuguta (S3)
- Music by: Kenichiro Suehiro
- Studio: David Production
- Licensed by: Crunchyroll (Note: Formerly known as Funimation)
- Original network: JNN (MBS, TBS) (S1); MBS, TBS, BS-TBS (S2–3); HBC, tbc, TUF, BSN, RCC, tys, itv, RKB, RBC, MRT, SBC, OBS (S2); CBC, SBS, NBC (S3)
- English network: SEA: Aniplus Asia; US: Adult Swim (Toonami)
- Original run: July 6, 2019 – April 4, 2026
- Episodes: 73
- icon

Fire Force (Japanese: 炎炎ノ消防隊, Hepburn: En'en no Shōbōtai; lit. 'Blazing Fire Brigade') is a Japanese manga series written and illustrated by Atsushi Ohkubo. It was serialized in Kodansha's shōnen manga magazine Weekly Shōnen Magazine from September 2015 to February 2022, with its chapters collected in 34 tankōbon volumes. In North America, the manga has been licensed for English language release by Kodansha USA.

It follows a youth with pyrokinetic abilities who joins a special force of firefighters developed to counter pyrokinetic monsters threatening Tokyo, which is the sole remaining city in a world ravaged by a global fire. The series acts as a prequel to Ohkubo's previous manga series, Soul Eater.

An anime television series adaptation, produced by David Production, aired its first season from July to December 2019, with a second season following from July to December 2020. A third and final season aired in two split cours, with the first airing from April to June 2025, and the second airing from January to April 2026.

By May 2022, the Fire Force manga had over 20 million copies in circulation.

== Synopsis ==
=== Setting ===
The Great Cataclysm (大災害, Daisaigai) is an event that happened two hundred and fifty years ago, 50 years before the Solar year 0. During that event, the world was set on fire, and many nations were wiped out with very few habitable areas left in the aftermath. The survivors took refuge in the Tokyo Empire, which remained mostly stable during the period despite losing some of its landmass. The Tokyo Emperor Raffles I establishes the faith of the Holy Sol Temple as it and Haijima Industries developed the perpetual thermal energy plant Amaterasu to power the country.

In Year 198 of Tokyo's Solar Era, special fire brigades called the Fire Force fight increasing incidents of spontaneous human combustion where human beings are turned into living infernos called "Infernals" (焰ビト, Homura Bito). While the Infernals are first-generation cases of spontaneous human combustion, with more powerful horned variations known as Demons, later generations possess pyrokinesis while retaining human form. The Fire Force was formed by combining people with these powers from the Holy Sol Temple, The Tokyo Armed Forces, and the Fire Defense Agency, and is composed of eight independent companies.

=== Plot ===
Shinra Kusakabe is a third generation pyrokinetic youth who gained the nickname "Devil's Footprints" for his ability to ignite his feet at will, and was ostracized as a child for the fire that killed his mother and younger brother Sho twelve years ago. He joins Special Fire Force Company 8, which features other pyrokinetics who dedicated themselves to ending the Infernal attacks for good while investigating Companies 1 through 7 for potential corruption in their ranks. Shinra begins to learn that the fire that killed his mother was a cover for Sho to be taken by the White-Clad, a doomsday cult behind the Infernal attacks with agents within the facets of the Tokyo Empire. Company 8 and their allies oppose the White-Clad while learning of their goal to gather eight individuals like Shinra and Sho to repeat the Great Cataclysm for an ancient being who manipulated humanity for that very purpose.

== Media ==
=== Manga ===
Written and illustrated by Atsushi Ohkubo, Fire Force was serialized in Kodansha's shōnen manga magazine Weekly Shōnen Magazine from September 23, 2015, to February 22, 2022. In the final chapter, it is hinted that Fire Force is connected to Ohkubo's other manga series Soul Eater. Kodansha collected its 304 chapters in thirty-four tankōbon volumes, released from February 17, 2016, to May 17, 2022.

The series is licensed for English release in North America by Kodansha USA, which published the volumes from November 8, 2016, to October 3, 2023. A 12-volume omnibus edition was released by the publisher from November 29, 2022, to September 17, 2024.

=== Anime ===
An anime television series adaptation produced by David Production was announced in November 2018. The series was directed by Yuki Yase, with Yamato Haishima handling the series' scripts, Hideyuki Morioka designing the characters and Kenichiro Suehiro composing the music. To promote the series, voice actors Gakuto Kajiwara and Kazuya Nakai were appointed as official firefighters for a day on March 2, 2019, in cooperation with the Tokyo Fire Department's Kanda fire station, where they participated in a simulated drill at the Akihabara Radio Kaikan. The series aired from July 6 to December 28, 2019, on the Super Animeism programming block on all JNN affiliates, including MBS and TBS. (Note: MBS and TBS listed the series premiere on July 5, 2019, at 25:25, which is effectively July 6 at 1:25 a.m. JST.) The first opening theme song is "Inferno" (インフェルノ), performed by Mrs. Green Apple, while the first ending theme song is "Veil", performed by Keina Suda. The second opening theme song is "Mayday", performed by Coldrain feat. Ryo from Crystal Lake, while the second ending theme song is "Nо̄nai" (脳内; 'Inside the Brain'), performed by Lenny Code Fiction. Due to the Kyoto Animation arson attack on July 18, 2019, Episode 3, which was originally scheduled to air on July 20, was postponed to July 27.

Following the finale of the first season, a second season was announced in December 2019. Tatsuma Minamikawa replaced Yuki Yase as director, while also serving series composition for the season. The second season aired from July 4 to December 12, 2020, on the Animeism programming block on MBS, TBS, BS-TBS, and other networks. (Note: MBS and TBS listed the second season's premiere on July 3, 2020, at 25:55, which is effectively July 4 at 1:55 a.m. JST.) The first opening theme song is "Spark-Again", performed by Aimer, while the first ending theme song is "ID", performed by Cider Girl. The second opening theme song is "Torch of Liberty", performed by Kana-Boon, while the second ending theme song is "Desire", performed by Pelican Fanclub.

A third season was announced in May 2022. In July 2024 at Anime Expo, it was announced that the third and final season would air in two split cours on the Animeism programming block on MBS, TBS, CBC, and other networks. The first cours aired from April 5 to June 21, 2025, while the second cours aired from January 10 to April 4, 2026. (Note: MBS, TBS, and CBC listed the third season's first cours premiere on April 4 at 25:53, which is effectively April 5 at 1:53 a.m. JST; the second cours premiere was listed on January 9 at 25:53, effectively January 10 at 1:53 a.m. JST.) Sei Tsuguta replaced Minamikawa on series composition for the season, while the latter returned as series director. For the first cours, the opening theme song is "Tsuyobi" (強火; 'High Flame'), performed by Queen Bee, while the ending theme song is "Urusiren" (ウルサイレン), performed by Umeda Cypher. For the second cours, the opening theme song is "Ignis" (イグニス, Igunisu), performed by Takanori Nishikawa, while the ending theme song is "Speak of the Devil", performed by Survive Said the Prophet.

Funimation (later Crunchyroll) streamed the series on its now-defunct FunimationNow service. On July 19, 2019, it was announced that Funimation's English dub of the series would begin simulcasting on Adult Swim's Toonami programming block which aired from July 28, 2019, to February 2, 2020. The second season aired on the same programming block from November 8, 2020 (two weeks later than its original scheduled date), to May 9, 2021. The series has been simulcast in Southeast Asia on Aniplus Asia.

=== Stage plays ===
In 2020, a stage-play adaptation of the series ran from July 31 to August 2 at the Umeda Arts Theater in Osaka and from August 7 to August 9 at KT Zepp Yokohama in Kanagawa. The play was directed by Sho Kubota, script written by Yusei Naruse, and music composed by Masaki Miyoshi; the protagonist Shinra Kusakabe was played by Hikaru Makishima. In 2022, a second stage-play ran from January 18–23 at KT Zepp Yokohama and from January 27–30 at the Sankei Hall Breeze in Osaka; it featured the same staff and Makishima reprised his role as Shinra. Also in 2022, a third stage-play ran from September 17–25 at the Sunshine Theatre in Tokyo and from September 29 to October 2 at the Kyoto-Gekijo in Kyoto; Shinra was played by Ryoga Ishikawa.

=== Video game ===
In May 2022, a video game titled Fire Force: Enbu no Shō (炎炎ノ消防隊 炎舞ノ章) was announced. It was released for iOS and Android on January 30, 2023. Mrs. Green Apple performs the game's theme song "Enen". The game ended service on August 29, 2025.

== Reception ==
By January 2018, the manga had 1.8 million copies in circulation; 7.3 million copies in circulation by June 2020; 10 million copies in circulation by July 2020; 12 million copies in circulation by October 2020; 15 million copies in circulation by April 2021; 16 million copies in circulation by June 2021; 17.5 million copies in circulation as of February 2022; and over 20 million copies in circulation by May 2022.

The series ranked thirteenth on the "Nationwide Bookstore Employees' Recommended Comics of 2017" poll by Honya Club online bookstore. On TV Asahi's Manga Sōsenkyo 2021 poll, in which 150,000 people voted for their top 100 manga series, Fire Force ranked 84th. The manga was nominated for the 45th Kodansha Manga Award in the shōnen category in 2021.

Gadget Tsūshin listed the prayer for Infernals, "Látom", on their 2019 most popular anime-related buzzwords list. In 2020, Fire Force was nominated for Best Opening Sequence ("Inferno" by Mrs. Green Apple) and Best Ending Sequence ("Veil" by Keina Suda) at the 4th Crunchyroll Anime Awards. The anime's third season was nominated for Best Anime Series at the 5th Astra TV Awards in 2025.
