= Anyah =

Malagasy politician and musician (born 1984)

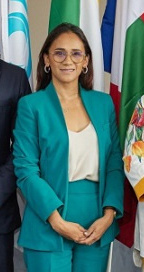
- Anyah in 2023

Member of the National Assembly
- Incumbent
- Assumed office 27 May 2019
- Constituency: Antananarivo III

Personal details
- Born: Ny Aina Tsirimaharo Rafenomanantsoa; 18 May 1984 (age 42) Antananarivo, Madagascar
- Party: Young Malagasies Determined
- Education: University of Reunion Island
- Occupation: Politician, musician

Tsirimaharo Ny Aina Rafenomanantsoa (born 18 May 1984), better known as Anyah, is a Malagasy politician and soul musician who has served as a member of the National Assembly since 2019. She represents the third district of Antananarivo, the country's capital, as a member of Young Malagasies Determined.

== Biography ==
Anyah was born on 18 May 1984 in Antananarivo and grew up in the city's outskirts, in the suburb of Itaosy. As a child, she sang Evangelical songs at church. She studied economics at the University of Reunion Island in the eponymous Réunion.

She made her first musical breakthrough after winning the Graine de Stars competition, which garnered the attention of Réunion magazine Star Top TV. The magazine featured her in its next front cover, albeit with her name misspelled as Anyah. She named Mariah Carey as one of her influences. Shortly after the magazine's publishment, Anyah was supported by the musician and songwriter Pana Reeve, who became her manager at the time. In 2001, she won the Coup de pouce Mosaïc competition organized by Universal Music and Crédit Agricole in Réunion.

Her first album, "Henika Fitiavana", was released in March 2004 in Madagascar. She then went on to perform concerts and tours in Europe and Asia. In 2007, she released her second album, "Mankafy", and founded her own soul group in Madagascar, made up of young artists and musicians.

Anyah was elected to Madagascar's National Assembly in the 2019 parliamentary election as a representative of Young Malagasies Determined for the third district of Antananarivo. She was reelected in 2024.
