= Áine Ní Cheanainn =

Áine Ní Cheanainn (1907–1999) was headmistress and co-founder of the Teachers Group of Comhairle na nÓg.

Ní Cheanainn was born in Derryvea, Kiltimagh, County Mayo, daughter of a shopkeeper. She was taught locally before attending Carysfort Training College from 1925 to 1927, graduating with a qualification for primary level. She later studied at UCD, where she obtained an M.A. in education.

She taught at Scoil Mhuire in Howth from 1927, and became principal of Scoil Eoin Baiste girls' school in Clontarf in 1941. By the 1950s, Scoil Eoin was one of the most prestigious in Dublin. The following decade she introduced audio-visual equipment, years before their official introduction as part of the curriculum in 1974.

Ní Cheanainn was actively involved in many areas of education, such as the Eigse Raifteri summer school, the Comoradh Mhic Eil, the Irish branch of UNESCO, the Irish-German society, and Corfheile na Scoileanna.

She was a co-founder of the Teachers Group of Comhairle na nÓg, which replaced the Children's Film Committee set up by the Irish Film Society and became part of National Film Institute. She was the only woman appointed to the Radio Éireann authority, serving from 1960 to 1965, but was disappointed not to be asked to serve a second term. It was at her insistence that the authority's name was changed to Raidió Teilifís Éireann in 1966.

She published a biography of John MacHale in 1983.

Áine Ní Cheanainn remained unmarried. She spent the last years of her life at Grove Nursing Home, Killiney, County Dublin. She died in June 1999 and was buried in Kiltimagh, survived by one sister.
