= Narumi Takahira =

Japanese actress and voice actress

Narumi Takahira (高平 成美, Takahira Narumi; born July 29, 1989) is a Japanese actress and voice actress from Tokyo, Japan.

== Filmography ==
- Soul Eater (2008), Patty Thompson
- Ryoko's Case File (2008), High School Girl
- Darker than Black: Ryūsei no Gemini (2009), Ariel
