= Anja Kotar =

Slovenian singer-songwriter

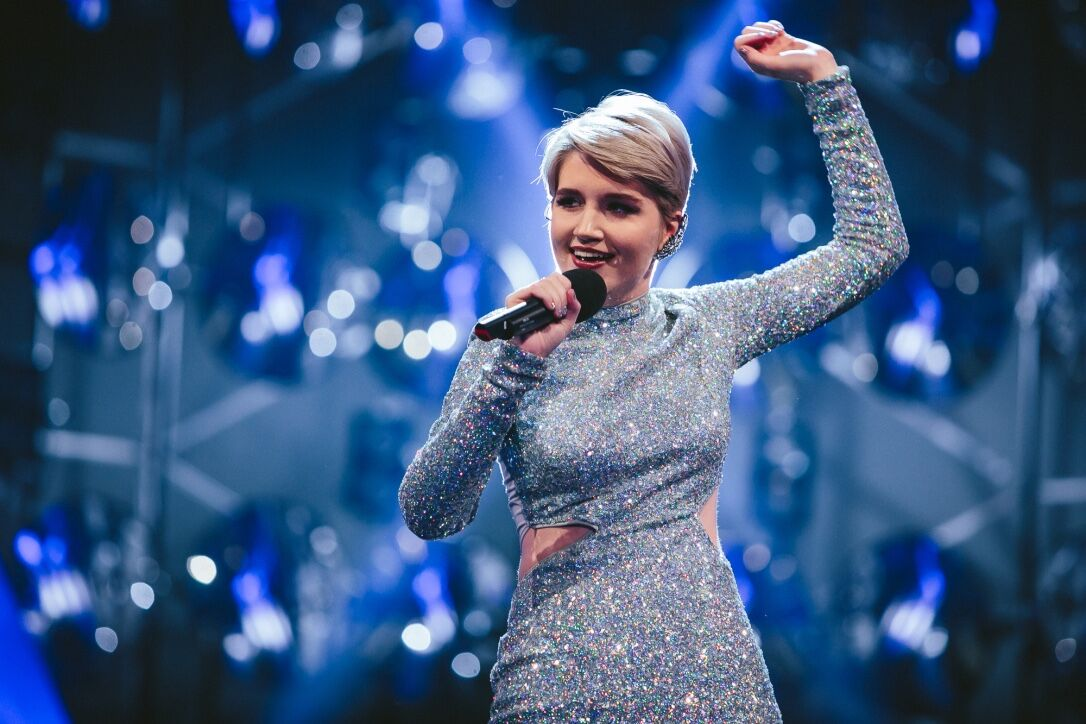
Anja Kotar at EMA Slovenia (2016)

Anja Kotar is a Slovenian singer-songwriter, pianist, and pop musician based in California. She first gained attention in Slovenia through appearances in X Factor Slovenija and the films Gremo mi po svoje, and later released pop music as an independent artist in the United States. In 2016, she was a finalist in EMA, Slovenia's national selection for the Eurovision Song Contest, with the song "Too Cool".

== Early life and education ==
Kotar is from Slovenia and later moved to California. In 2016, Slovenske novice reported that Kotar had lived in the United States since 2012 and that she was known in Slovenia from X Factor Slovenija and the films Gremo mi po svoje. Siol.net reported in 2017 that she had moved to San Jose, California, where she completed high school and studied music at Berklee College of Music. Radio Ognjišče also reported in 2016 that Kotar was studying at Berklee College of Music.

== Career ==
In 2016, Kotar performed "Čas je zdaj" at Dnevi slovenske zabavne glasbe. Radio Ognjišče reported that she received an award there for most promising performer and author. The same year, she competed in EMA 2016, Slovenia's national selection for the Eurovision Song Contest, with the self-written English-language song "Too Cool". Slovenske novice reported that the 2016 EMA performance followed her return from California to Slovenia for festival appearances.

In 2017, Siol.net reported that Kotar had previously recorded a debut EP with the support of a Kickstarter campaign and was preparing a full-length album. Later that year, CelebMix interviewed Kotar about her debut album Nomad, describing it as a concept album based partly on her experience of moving from Slovenia to California.

In 2018, 24ur reported that Kotar had auditioned for the sixteenth season of American Idol. The same article noted that she had released Nomad in 2017.

Kotar later received coverage from English-language music publications for her independent pop releases. In 2018, Music Connection profiled her in its "DIY Spotlight" series. The same year, The Line of Best Fit covered her single "Kids".

In 2021, Notion covered Kotar's Songs From Isolation EP, describing it as a response to the COVID-19 pandemic. Earmilk also covered her single "Fun For You".

== Discography ==
=== Albums and extended plays ===
- Nomad (2017)
- Songs From Isolation (2021)
- 12 Months (2022)

=== Selected singles ===
- "Too Cool" (2016)
- "Kids" (2018)
- "Movie" (2021)
- "Fun For You" (2021)
