= Áine Hardiman =

Irish nun, anti-apartheid activist (1926–2013)

- family photo
- Born: Anne Hardiman; 23 April 1926; Dublin, Ireland
- Died: 8 March 2013 (aged 86); Cape Town, South Africa
- Burial place: Springfield, Cape Town
- Education: University College Dublin
- Occupation: Dominican nun
- Known for: Anti-apartheid activist
- Title: Sister

Áine "Nancy" Hardiman born Anne Hardiman clan name of Dlamini (23 April 1926 – 8 March 2013) was an Irish nun and anti-apartheid activist in South Africa.

== Life ==
Hardiman was born in Dublin in 1926 and she was one of seven siblings. She attended a school that was part of the Eccles Street Dominican Convent. Her school, Scoil Chaitríona was founded by a Dominican nun, and used Irish as its first language She attended University College Dublin to take Maths and philosophy, but she had already decided to be a Dominican nun at age eighteen. As soon as her degree was complete, she was sent out to South Africa where she found herself leading a school that only enrolled white children. She was part of the system to which she objected. She began working with mothers in Nyanga township. Protests were violent and their would-be on-going fights with police, but children were still there, and they needed to be educated. She oversaw a distributed system of lessons, but she remained unseen.

In 1985 she signed a document named Kairos (aka moment of truth). The document was signed be religious leaders of different faiths and its purpose was to expose their belief that the Dutch Reformed Church had no theological foundation for its support of the racist government.

She was in the Irish news in 1987 because she had profoundly disagreed with a message sent by the Pope to bishops in South Africa. The pope advised that the bishops should stay out of politics and Hardiman found this message incredible. She had spent 35 years in South Africa and she believed that those who remained silent to the apartheid government were complicit with the regime. She was interviewed on Irish Television by David Hanly where she said that the church should side with the oppressed. Hardiman's brother worked at RTE.

After the apartheid government gave way to democratic elections in the early 1990s, Hardiman returned to Ireland to visit family and participate in various religious and ecological retreats. She visited more than once but her home was in different South African convents. Her friends knew her as "Nancy" and she was given the clan name of "Dlamini".

Hardiman died in Cape Town in 2013 ending a sixty-year mission in the country.
