= Anja Strømme =

Ionospheric physicist

- Education: University of Tromsø
- Scientific career
- Workplaces: SRI International, NSF, ESA

Anja Strømme is an ionospheric physicist at SRI International and the principal scientist at the Sondrestrom Upper Atmospheric Research Facility. She has also worked with the National Science Foundation. Strømme has been a member of the American Geophysical Union since 2005.

== Education ==
Strømme studied at the University of Tromsø, Norway. Her research area was ionospheric and atmospheric measurements performed north of the Arctic Circle using radar. She received her M.Sc. in 1999 on the topic Anomalous Ion Spectra and Ion Outflow Observed with the EISCAT Svalbard Radar and her Ph.D. in 2004 with a thesis entitled Naturally Enhanced Wave Modes Observed with the EISCAT Svalbard Radar.

== Career ==
Strømme works as a senior scientist at SRI International. She worked at the Sondestrom Upper Atmospheric Research Facility before it ceased operations in 2018, contributing to publications between 2001 and 2016. She was awarded funding for the project through the National Science Foundation from 2009 to 2015, then from 2015 to 2018.

In 2012, Strømme began working as a program officer for the NSF, on leave from SRI International. Her position was as a "rotator" on a year-long contract, assigned to assess a backlog of grant applications. She has discussed her sudden termination following alleged misconduct in relation to conflict of interest rules, though she maintains that she was unaware of having mishandled any grant applications and was never informed of the specifics of her dismissal. Strømme returned to SRI International after this occurred, but her public statements led to requests that the NSF provide more protection and clearer guidelines for rotators, including the ability to review and respond to allegations of misconduct.

Since 2019, Strømme has worked with the European Space Agency on the Sentinel-3 and Swarm missions. She chaired part of the 9th Swarm Data Quality Workshop (SDQW) in 2019, discussing the overall mission status and plans. Strømme receives and helps researchers use ESA mission data to solve problems, for instance assessing the sustainability of fishing based on satellite images and machine learning. Another Swarm data project is tracking the magnetic north pole.

Strømme is also a senior advisor at the Norwegian Space Center.
