= Soul Eater =

Japanese manga series

- First tankōbon volume cover, featuring Maka (right), Soul (bottom-left) and Blair (top-left)

ソウルイーター (Sōru Ītā)
- Genre: Action; Dark comedy; Dark fantasy
- Manga
- Written by: Atsushi Ohkubo
- Published by: Square Enix
- English publisher: NA: Yen Press; Square Enix (Perfect Edition)
- Imprint: Gangan Comics
- Magazine: Monthly Shōnen Gangan
- English magazine: NA: Yen Plus
- Original run: May 12, 2004 – August 12, 2013
- Volumes: 25
- Anime television series
- Directed by: Takuya Igarashi
- Produced by: Aya Yoshino; Taihei Yamanishi; Yoshihiro Oyabu
- Written by: Akatsuki Yamatoya
- Music by: Taku Iwasaki
- Studio: Bones
- Licensed by: Crunchyroll (Note: In North America through Crunchyroll, LLC (formerly known as Funimation).); SEA: Medialink
- Original network: TXN (TV Tokyo)
- English network: PH: ABS-CBN, Hero, Studio 23; US: Funimation Channel, Adult Swim (Toonami), Crunchyroll Channel
- Original run: April 7, 2008 – March 30, 2009
- Episodes: 51
- Spin-off
- Soul Eater Not! (2011–14)
- icon

Soul Eater (Japanese: ソウルイーター, Hepburn: Sōru Ītā) is a Japanese manga series written and illustrated by Atsushi Ohkubo. Set at the "Death Weapon Meister Academy", the series revolves around three teams, each consisting of a weapon meister and at least one human that can transform into a weapon. Trying to make the latter a "Death Scythe" and thus fit for use by the academy's headmaster Shinigami, the personification of death, they must collect the souls of 99 evil humans and one witch, in that order; otherwise, they will have to start all over again.

The manga was preceded by three separate one-shots published by Square Enix in 2003; the first two published in two Gangan Powered special editions and the last one in Gangan Wing. Soul Eater was regularly serialized in Square Enix's Monthly Shōnen Gangan magazine from May 2004 to August 2013. Its chapters were collected in 25 tankōbon volumes. A 51-episode anime television series adaptation produced by Bones was broadcast on TV Tokyo from April 2008 to March 2009. The series has also spawned a drama CD, an art book, and three video games. A spin-off manga series, titled Soul Eater Not!, was serialized in Monthly Shōnen Gangan from January 2011 to November 2014. Soul Eater was licensed for distribution in North America by Yen Press; it was serialized in Yen Press' Yen Plus manga anthology starting in July 2008, and the first manga volume was released in October 2009. The anime series has been licensed in English by Funimation (later Crunchyroll).

The Soul Eater manga had 20.4 million copies in circulation by February 2022. The manga and anime have garnered positive reception for their distinctive Gothic aesthetic—frequently likened to Tim Burton's The Nightmare Before Christmas—though some critics have noted excessive fanservice and conventional shōnen tropes.

== Synopsis ==
=== Setting ===
Death Weapon Meister Academy

Soul Eater is set at Death Weapon Meister Academy (死神武器職人専門学校, Shinigami Buki Shokunin Senmon Gakkō)—"DWMA" (死武専, Shibusen) for short—located in the fictional Death City in Nevada, United States. The school is run by Shinigami, also known as Death, as a training facility for humans with the ability to transform into weapons, as well as the wielders of those weapons, called meisters (職人, shokunin). Attending this school are Maka Albarn and her scythe partner, Soul Eater; assassin Black Star and his partner, Tsubaki Nakatsukasa, who turns into various ninja weapons; and Shinigami's son, Death the Kid, and his pistol partners, Liz and Patty Thompson. The meister students' goal is to have their weapons absorb the souls of 99 evil humans and one witch, which dramatically increases the weapon's power and turns them into "Death Scythes" used by Shinigami.

=== Plot ===
Maka and Soul battle the witch Medusa, who forces Crona, her child and meister of the demon sword Ragnarok, to collect non-evil human souls and eventually transform into a kishin (鬼神), an evil god. Medusa and her cohorts attack DWMA to revive Asura, the first kishin who nearly plunged the entire world into madness before being sealed beneath DWMA by Shinigami. Despite the combined efforts of Maka, Black Star, and Death the Kid, Medusa's group successfully revives Asura, who leaves to spread chaos around the world after a brief battle with Shinigami. Medusa is seemingly killed by meister and DWMA teacher Franken Stein, while Crona surrenders to DWMA and enrolls there.

As a result of Asura's spreading madness, Medusa's sister Arachne comes out of hiding and reforms her organization, Arachnophobia, which poses a serious threat to DWMA. Shinigami calls in Death Scythes from around the world to aid in the fight against Arachnophobia. During this time, Medusa reappears with her soul possessing the body of a young girl, and forms a truce with DWMA so they can annihilate Arachnophobia together. The DWMA students and Medusa's entourage infiltrate Arachnophobia's headquarters, where Maka kills Arachne, only for Medusa to betray DWMA, possess Arachne's body, and brainwash Crona into rejoining her. Meanwhile, Death the Kid is captured by Noah, an artificial construct created from the Book of Eibon. Following this, Maka uses Arachne's soul to turn Soul into a Death Scythe. The duo become part of the newly formed meister unit Spartoi along with their friends, who rescue Death the Kid and defeat Noah.

Crona resurfaces in a city in Russia, destroying it and the Death Scythe stationed there, before being provoked by Medusa into killing her and getting taken by insanity. Maka is ordered by Shinigami to hunt down Crona; while searching for Crona with her powers, she unwittingly detects Asura's location on the cartoonish moon within the atmosphere. DWMA launches an attack on the moon to defeat Asura, aided by the witches after Death the Kid convinces them to establish a temporary alliance. During the battle, Crona absorbs Asura's body before being overtaken by him. Maka, Black Star, and Death the Kid eventually restore Crona's sanity and defeat Asura by sealing him on the moon with his own blood; Crona willingly remains with Asura to keep him imprisoned, and Maka promises to one day rescue Crona. The DWMA forces return to Earth, where Death the Kid becomes the new Shinigami following his father's death and establishes a peace treaty with the witches, with Soul being declared the last Death Scythe.

== Production ==
After the end of his first manga series, B.Ichi, Atsushi Ohkubo created a one-shot story called "Soul Eater" published in June 2003 by Gangan Powered. Japanese readers were so fascinated by it that Ohkubo created two other one-shots called "Black Star" and "Death the Kid", published in September and November 2003, respectively. Since the results were high, the editor of Gangan Comics asked Ohkubo to create a series from his one-shots which became the introductory chapters to Soul Eater.

In an interview, Ohkubo said that the series was greatly inspired by ideas from Tim Burton's animations, and by concepts from J. K. Rowling's Harry Potter. Ohkubo also stated he decided to make the main protagonist of the series, Maka Albarn, a female to differ from the traditional male hero found in most shōnen manga, and paired her and the other main characters with those of the opposite sex to demonstrate an equal representation of gender. He also said the series' title, Soul Eater, was intended to refer to Asura and his desire to eat innocent souls, and not to the character, Soul "Eater" Evans. Ohkubo has explained that, when he began Soul Eater, he already had the plot and details like the DWMA fully formed and shared with his editors. He thought too many manga had characters who were developed through flashbacks, which he considered too clever. Therefore, he decided to develop his characters in the present rather than referring to their pasts, and to focus on "action and momentum," so he could "write freely".

== Media ==
=== Manga ===
Atsushi Ohkubo wrote three one-shot chapters published by Square Enix. "Soul Eater" (ソウルイーター, Sōru Ītā) and "Black Star" (ブラック・スター, Burakku Sutā) were published in the summer and autumn special editions of Gangan Powered, released on June 24 and September 22, 2003, respectively; the third one-shot, "Death the Kid", was published in Gangan Wing on November 26, 2003. Soul Eater started in Square Enix's shōnen manga magazine Monthly Shōnen Gangan on May 12, 2004, and finished after a nine-year run in the magazine on August 12, 2013. Square Enix compiled the series' 113 individual chapters into 25 tankōbon volumes, released under its Gangan Comics imprint, between June 22, 2004, and December 12, 2013. Square Enix republished the series in a 17-volume kanzenban edition, titled Soul Eater: The Perfect Edition, released from July 12, 2019, to March 12, 2020.

The manga has been licensed by Yen Press for distribution in English in North America. The manga was initially serialized in Yen Press' Yen Plus anthology magazine; the first issue went on sale on July 29, 2008. The first English volume of the manga was published on October 27, 2009. The last volume was published on March 24, 2015. In July 2019, Square Enix announced the English release of Soul Eater: The Perfect Edition. The 17 volumes were released from July 28, 2020, to February 4, 2025.

Another manga series by Ohkubo, Soul Eater Not!, which ran alongside the main series, was serialized in Monthly Shōnen Gangan from January 12, 2011, to November 10, 2014. Five tankōbon volumes were released between September 22, 2011, and December 22, 2014. It was licensed by Yen Press in North America, with its five volumes released from July 24, 2012, and August 4, 2015.

=== Drama CD ===
A drama CD was released on August 31, 2005, by Square Enix titled Soul Eater (Vol. 1): Special Social Studies Field Trip (ソウルイーター(Vol.1)特別社会科見学, Sōru Ītā (Vol. 1) Tokubetsu Shakaika Kengaku). The CD came bundled with an art book and a script of the CD dialogue. Of the cast used for the drama CD, only Black Star's voice actress Yumiko Kobayashi was retained for the anime voice cast.

=== Anime ===
A 51-episode anime adaptation was directed by Takuya Igarashi and produced by Bones, Aniplex, Dentsu, Media Factory, and TV Tokyo; Bones and Aniplex were responsible for the animation and music production respectively. The scenario writer was Akatsuki Yamatoya who based the anime's story on Ohkubo's original concept. Character design was headed by Yoshiyuki Ito, with overall art direction by Norifumi Nakamura. The anime's conceptual design was done by Shinji Aramaki. The episodes aired on TV Tokyo between April 7, 2008, and March 30, 2009, and two animated specials aired on May 29 and June 1, 2008. The series aired in two versions: the regular evening broadcast and a late-night "Soul Eater Late Show" version, which included special footage. The dual broadcast of the series was billed as the "world's first evening and late-night resonance broadcast". The "resonance" term refers to a story concept in which Maka and her living weapon partner, Soul Eater, achieve maximum power by synchronizing their souls. Media Factory collected the episodes in thirteen DVDs, released from August 22, 2008, to August 25, 2009. The series was rebroadcast on TV Tokyo, under the title Soul Eater: Repeat Show (ソウルイーター リピートショー, Sōru Ītā Ripīto Shō), on September 30, 2010, featuring new opening and closing themes. Media Factory and Kadokawa brought the two previous Blu-ray box sets together into one box set released on February 26, 2014.

In North America, the anime has been licensed by Funimation, who released the series in four half-season DVD box sets starting with the first volume in February 2010. The anime made its North American television debut on Funimation Channel in September 2010. It later aired on Adult Swim's Toonami programming block from February 17, 2013, to March 16, 2014.

==== Music ====
Six pieces of theme music are used for the episodes: two opening themes and four ending themes. For the first 30 episodes, the first opening theme is "Resonance", performed by T.M.Revolution. For episodes 31–51, the second opening theme is "Papermoon", performed by Tommy heavenly6. For the first 13 episodes (and the 51st episode), the first ending theme is "I Wanna Be", performed by Stance Punks. For episodes 14–26, the second ending theme is "Style", performed by Kana Nishino. For episodes 27–39, the third ending theme is "Bakusō Yume Uta" (爆走夢歌; lit. 'High-Speed Dream Song'), performed by Diggy-MO'. For episodes 40–50, the fourth ending theme is "Strength", performed by Abingdon Boys School. Soul Eater: Repeat Show features two additional opening and ending themes. The first opening theme is "Counter Identity", performed by Unison Square Garden, and the first ending theme is "Ao no Kaori" (碧の香り; lit. 'The Scent of Blue'), performed by Yui Makino. The second opening theme is "Ai ga Hoshii yo" (愛がほしいよ; lit. 'I Want Love'), performed by Shion Tsuji, and the second ending theme is "Northern Lights", performed by How Merry Marry.

The first character song maxi single sung by Chiaki Omigawa (Maka) and Kōki Uchiyama (Soul) was released on August 6, 2008, by Aniplex. The second single by Yumiko Kobayashi (Black Star) and Kaori Nazuka (Tsubaki) was released on September 3, 2008, and the third single by Mamoru Miyano (Kid), Akeno Watanabe (Liz), and Narumi Takahira (Patty) was released on October 1, 2008. Composed and produced by Taku Iwasaki, two CD soundtracks have been released for the Soul Eater anime series. Soul Eater Original Soundtrack 1 was released on August 27, 2008, with 20 tracks, and Soul Eater Original Soundtrack 2 was released on March 18, 2009, with 22 tracks by Aniplex. The theme song for Soul Eater: Monotone Princess is "Soul's Crossing" sung by T.M.Revolution, and is included on the "Resonance" single.

=== Video games ===
Three Soul Eater video games were produced. The first, Soul Eater: Monotone Princess (ソウルイーター モノトーン プリンセス, Sōru Ītā Monotōn Purinsesu) is an action-adventure video game exclusively for the Wii and developed by Square Enix with Bones. It was released on September 25, 2008, in Japan. Two characters that appear in the game, Grimoire (グリモア, Gurimoa) and Ponera (ポネラ), are original characters designed by author Ohkubo; Ponera is the titular Monotone Princess and Grimoire is known as Noah in the manga. A soundtrack called Shibusen's Treasure "Campus Broadcast Music Complete Works" (死武専秘蔵「校内放送楽曲大全」) was released as a pre-order bonus CD.

The second game, Soul Eater: Plot of Medusa (ソウルイーター メデューサの陰謀, Sōru Ītā Medyūsa no Inbō) is an action game produced by Namco Bandai Games for the Nintendo DS and was released on October 23, 2008. Despite being created by two different companies, there are similarities between the Nintendo Wii game and the Nintendo DS game. It is a third-person hack-and-slash game.

The third game, Soul Eater: Battle Resonance (ソウルイーター バトルレゾナンス, Sōru Ītā Batoru Rezonansu) is a fighting game developed by BEC and produced by Namco Bandai Games for the PlayStation 2 and PlayStation Portable, and was released on January 29, 2009. This game follows the story line of the first 24 episodes of the anime series and allows the player to engage in the training and battles the characters experienced first hand. Along with new costumes and items, the player gets to experience the minds and wardrobes of each playable character.

=== Other media ===
An art exhibition to celebrate the series' 20th anniversary ran at Tokyo's Space Galleria from August 23 to September 23, 2024, and at Osaka's Space Gratus from October 25 to November 25 of the same year. A special video featuring Chiaki Omigawa and Koki Uchiyama, Maka and Soul's voice actors respectively, was released alongside a teaser visual for the event.

== Reception ==
=== Manga ===
Soul Eater was the seventh best-selling manga in 2008, with 3,076,351 copies sold. By October 2012, the manga had over 13 million copies in circulation; by April 2018, the manga had sold 18.2 million copies worldwide. By July 2019, it had 19.6 million copies in circulation, and by February 2022, it had over 20.4 million copies in circulation.

Danielle Leigh of Comic Book Resources praised the first volume's stylish visuals, comparing Ohkubo's art to Tim Burton's The Nightmare Before Christmas and The Corpse Bride, noting its effective pairing with references to Jack the Ripper and Frankenstein. However, she criticized its excessive fanservice and "pattern-oriented, shallow" art style. Penny Kenny of Manga Life awarded it a "B+", commending its dynamic action sequences and varied art styles ranging from Blade of the Immortal to Yu-Gi-Oh! and Burton-esque aesthetics. Julian Gnam of Otaku USA appreciated its weapon-meister dynamics, but found the plot conventional and the fanservice excessive, though noted its accessibility for casual readers.

Chris Zimmerman of Comic Book Bin rated the second volume 7.5/10, praising its creative character designs and action, but criticizing its lack of character development and formulaic shōnen structure. Shaenon Garrity of About.com awarded the first two volumes 2/5 stars, describing its world as a "hyperkinetic Halloween" that is equally similar to Shaman King, JoJo's Bizarre Adventure, and The Nightmare Before Christmas, but criticized its "bland characters" and "meandering story."

Nicholas Dupree of Anime News Network gave Soul Eater: The Perfect Edition a B+, praising its unique charm and Gothic aesthetics, but felt that its humor has aged poorly and criticized its excessive sexualized content.

=== Anime ===
Critics praised Soul Eater for its distinctive Gothic aesthetic and energetic execution. Casey Brienza of Anime News Network (ANN) observed that despite conventional tournament tropes, the series' Burton-inspired visuals (comparing it to Beetlejuice and The Nightmare Before Christmas) demonstrate greater stylistic refinement than the comparable D.Gray-man series. Jacob Hope Chapman described it as "[d]ark but lively, visually imaginative, explosive great fun." James Brusuelas of Animation World Network highlighted its unapologetic entertainment value as "a series that takes the guilt out of your guilty pleasure."

The animation style received particular acclaim. Holly Ellingwood of Active Anime noted its "zany yet creepy" quality and consistent visual flair, while Sandra Scholes praised its "dark humour in a Gothic vein", and found the series similar to D.Gray-man and Bleach, with art reminiscent of Gorillaz videos. Chris Zimmerman of ComicBookBin awarded an "A−" rating, praising studio Bones' cinematic design and "eye pleasing animation" within shōnen conventions. Zimmerman later gave the Meister Collection Blu-ray set an A+ for balancing "flashy fights and themes of friendship" with exceptional production values.

Reviewers emphasized its Western influences. Jason Green noted its death god concepts executed with Gurren Lagann-style energy rather than Death Note seriousness, featuring characters inspired by Jack the Ripper, The Blair Witch Project, and other Western icons. Paul Chapman emphasized the series' incorporation of American horror motifs and varied architectural designs, describing the conclusion as competent though not particularly innovative. Serdar Yegulalp praised its climactic "gloriously absurd wide-scale action" evoking Gurren Lagann and Neon Genesis Evangelion.

The series appeared sixth in Charles Solomon's Los Angeles Times top ten anime series and was featured in Yegulalp's essential anime guide. Kara Dennison included it among Crunchyroll's recommended Halloween anime, while Stephanie Donaldson and Jacki Jing (ANN) listed it among anime deserving reboots.

Soul Eater was one of the Jury Recommended Works at the 12th Japan Media Arts Festival in 2008.
