= Áine Greaney =

Writer and editor

- Born: c. 1962; County Mayo
- Website: http://www.ainegreaney.com/

Áine Greaney (born c. 1962), is a writer and editor from Ireland, based in Boston.

== Biography ==
Áine Greaney was raised on a farm in County Mayo. She became a primary school teacher but in 1986 she gave that up and moved to the United States to live in Boston. Greaney works as an editor and writer with a number of books, essays, articles and short stories published across the US, the UK and Ireland. In her various encounters with education, Greaney has achieved a BEd in education and an MA in English. Greaney has worked on National Public Radio, Boston as well as having her work appear in The Boston Globe Magazine, The Feminist Wire, Forbes Women and Salon.com. Greaney is also the director of communications for a non-profit mental health agency. Greaney also runs workshops. She lives, with her husband, in Newburyport, Massachusetts, near Boston.

== Bibliography ==
- The Big House (2003)
- Dance Lessons (2011)
- Green Card & Other Essays
- Snow (2014)
- La Belle Femme (2014)
- Writer with a Day Job (2011)
