= Aine, Dahanu =

Village in Maharashtra

Aine
- village
- Location in Maharashtra, India Aine (India)
- Coordinates: 19.9003428°N 72.8308692°E
- Country: India
- State: Maharashtra
- District: Palghar
- Taluka: Dahanu
- Elevation: 54 m (177 ft)

Population (2011)
  - Total: 1,355
- Time zone: UTC+5:30 (IST)
- 2011 census code: 551735

Aine is a village in the Palghar district of Maharashtra, India. It is located in the Dahanu taluka.

== Demographics ==
According to the 2011 census of India, Aine has 272 households. The effective literacy rate (i.e. the literacy rate of population excluding children aged 6 and below) is 43.26%.

Demographics (2011 Census)
	Total	Male	Female
Population	1355	657	698
Children aged below 6 years	301	148	153
Scheduled caste	1	1	0
Scheduled tribe	1273	608	665
Literates	456	289	167
Workers (all)	611	345	266
Main workers (total)	537	307	230
Main workers: Cultivators	133	88	45
Main workers: Agricultural labourers	293	130	163
Main workers: Household industry workers	10	6	4
Main workers: Other	101	83	18
Marginal workers (total)	74	38	36
Marginal workers: Cultivators	5	3	2
Marginal workers: Agricultural labourers	5	4	1
Marginal workers: Household industry workers	1	1	0
Marginal workers: Others	63	30	33
Non-workers	744	312	432
