= B. Ichi =

Japanese manga series

- First tankōbon volume cover, featuring Shotaro

B壱
- Genre: Fantasy comedy
- Manga
- Written by: Atsushi Ohkubo
- Published by: Enix (2001–02); Square Enix (2003)
- English publisher: NA: Yen Press
- Imprint: Gangan Comics
- Magazine: Monthly Shōnen Gangan
- Original run: October 12, 2001 – May 12, 2003
- Volumes: 4
- icon

B. Ichi (B壱; 'B1') is a Japanese manga series written and illustrated by Atsushi Ohkubo. It was serialized in Enix's (later Square Enix) shōnen manga magazine Monthly Shōnen Gangan from October 2001 to May 2003, with its chapters collected in four tankōbon volumes. Set in the city of Toykyo, the series focuses on humans known as "Dokeshi", whose abilities to use more than 50% of their brain power allows them to unleash special powers, provided they meet one unique condition each day. For the Dokeshi Shotaro, his condition requires that he do one good deed daily to gain the powers of any animal by biting its bones. After Shotaro meets the traveler Mana, they begin a partnership and journey to find Emine, Shotaro's childhood friend.

The manga was licensed for English released in North America by Yen Press, which released its volumes from October 2008 to September 2009.

Ohkubo won the third Enix 21st Century Manga Grand Prize in 2001 for B. Ichi.

== Synopsis ==
While most ordinary humans use only 30% of their brains, a group of people known as "Dokeshi" can use between 50 and 60%, giving them special abilities. However, these powers come at a price: the Dokeshi must adhere to certain restrictions, and breaking these rules can result in the loss of something precious to them. Shotaro, for example, must perform one good deed every day. In the central town of Toykyo, he meets a girl named Mana, and together they embark on a journey to find Emine, Shotaro's childhood friend.

== Characters ==
=== Main characters ===
Shotaro (将太郎, Shōtarō)
Voiced by: Mayumi Tanaka (drama CD)
A young Dokeshi known as the "Kyokotsu", Shotaro's power allows him to mimic the abilities of animals by biting animal bones (e.g. the bone of a bird will give him the power of flight) with his condition to use his power being that he must do one good deed every day or he'll lose something "precious" inside of him. Childish and simple-minded, he's an avid fan of the "Charisma Justice" TV show and even copies the main character's "Justice Blade" attack, but has trouble remembering that it comes on every Sunday at 10:30. It is later revealed that Shotaro can draw power from any bone, and even call upon the memories and personality of the deceased. He greatly values his friendship with Emine and thus diligently performs his good deeds. Even though normal people hate and despise Dokeshi, he holds nothing against them.
Mana (真夏)
Voiced by: Saeko Chiba (drama CD)
A 16-year-old human girl who accompanies Shotaro on his journey to find his missing friend, Emine. She's constantly entering contests in order to get money. Originally from China, Mana is a highly skilled martial artist and is even capable of fighting on par with Dokeshi. Her fighting style is called "Hinoki-Ryu" and is only taught within her family. However, due her father's preference for her brother, Mana was neglected. She likes fortune telling, as it helps her make decisions, but she absolutely hates it whenever someone calls her "Garbage" as her name spelled backward in Japanese "Anam" means "Raw"; essentially making her "Raw Garbage".
Yohei Nanami (七海 陽平, Nanami Yōhei)
Voiced by: Yuto Nakano (drama CD)
A human male who also travels with Shotaro, Yohei's a mechanical genius capable of quickly and effortlessly building robots and other kinds of contraptions using nothing but random junk he finds lying around. He was once part of the "Dokeshi Hunt", but after his team was annihilated by Nofix, he was unable to get close to other people due to his fear of them getting hurt. His wields a special weapon known as the "Law-Abiding Silver Gun", a dog-shaped handgun that can be used to bite people and perform other useful features besides just shooting.
Tool (トゥール, Tūru)
Voiced by: Yūji Ueda (drama CD)
A kappa who loves kiwis (a pun, as the Japanese words for "cucumber" and "kiwi" sound alike), he possesses the unique ability to hear the emotions of people and objects. He normally lives in a garbage dump, but occasionally visits the city to buy kiwis. He hates most humans because he thinks they judge others based on appearance alone. He also has a complex when it comes to his lack of hair, flying into a violent rage and chasing down anyone who dares call him a "baldy", as Shotaro found out the hard way. His primary weapon is a giant pickaxe he can swing around using a length of rope attached to the end, all of his attacks are named after different kinds of snakes. As a Kappa, he also has the power to rip out souls, but unlike normal Kappa, Tool can only use this ability on inanimate objects.
Emine (エミネ)
Voiced by: Akira Ishida (drama CD)
A Dokeshi known as "Bai Ze" and Shotaro's childhood friend whom he's been desperately searching for all this time. Emine's power allows him to manipulate his blood and shape it into various demonic weapons, his condition is that he must perform one wicked deed every single day or he'll lose his treasured friendship with Shotaro. Despite still caring for Shotaro and their friendship, Emine believes the nature of their respective conditions makes it impossible for them to get along. He works as an observer for the Masked Assembly. Much like Shotaro, Emine is also an orphan.

=== The Masked Assembly ===
Apple Shinoda (アップル=シノダ, Appuru Shinoda)
Voiced by: Masaki Terasoma (drama CD)
One of Emine's coworkers, Apple is a Dokeshi whose power allows him to bypass the limits of human athleticism, enabling him to perform superhuman feats of strength and agility. His condition requires that he eat apples, which he constantly offers to others as well.
Lin Kinpar (鈴 琴羽, Rin Kinpā)
Voiced by: Aya Hirano (drama CD)
One of Emine's coworkers, Lin is a Dokeshi whose power allows her to freely deconstruct and reassemble her physical form at will, making it nearly impossible to actually damage her. Her condition requires her to willingly serves another person. It's also implied that she might have a crush on Emine.
Nofix (ノフィックス, Nofikkusu)
Voiced by: Ryuzou Ishino (drama CD)
An insane and sadistic Dokeshi who works for the Masked Assembly because they allow him to run wild. Known as the "King of Spin", Nofix has the power to manipulate rotational energy, allowing him to stop bullets by spinning them in the opposite direction and enhancing his body's natural healing process by spinning his own cells among other things. His daily condition is unknown as he's never shown doing or speaking about it. Besides his crazy and bloodthirsty nature, Nofix's also completely and utterly obsessed with Yohei, having a sexual (and perhaps even romantic) attraction to him, so much so that he's vowed to murder anyone and everyone who he associates with.
Rodigy (ロディジー, Rodijī)
Voiced by: Norio Wakamoto (drama CD)
A bald Dokeshi whose head resembles an incandescent light bulb, Rodigy is the vice president of the "Fear Factory", one of the many subdivisions of the Masked Assembly; he ordered the creation of the "Fear Robot" so he could take over the Masked Assembly and eventually the world. Known as the "Lightning Beast", his power allows him to emit blinding flashes of light as well as generate high voltage electricity, his condition being that he needs to bathe himself in light. Rodigy's an incredibly arrogant man with a great disdain of other people, frequently referring to them as "pig".
Agi (アッシー, Ajjī)
Voiced by: Ken'ichi Ogata (drama CD)
A member of the Fear Factory, he created the Fear Robot and various other robots. Although intelligent at first glance, the nature of some of his inventions are questionable to say the least. He dislikes it when his creations are insulted. His appearance resembles that of a tanuki and he often adds "correct?" to the ends of his sentences, which annoyed Tool greatly in their fight.
Zuno (ズーノ, Zūno)
A Dokeshi with long nose hairs, Zuno is the chief of the Fear Factory's Intelligence Division. His power enables him to use his nose hairs to pick up electromagnetic waves, allowing him to listen in on target from afar. His condition erases a recent memory of his whenever he utilizes his ability and, as a result, he cannot lead a normal life or even remember his assignments without help from his assistant, Assi. Despite being employed by the Fear Factory, Zuno is not a bad person and, according to Assi, he only joined the Factory because his condition prevents him from working at a normal company.
Assi (アッシー, Asshī)
A normal human with strange glasses that have the letter "A" engraved on the lenses, his job is to help Zuno remember things. Much like his boss, Assi's not a bad person and only works for the Fear Factory because his lack of intelligence prevents him from doing anything else.
Solence (ソレンス, Sorensu)
A big nosed Dokeshi employed by the Fear Factory. His ability enables him to produce different kinds of gasses within his body and his condition is that he needs to take deep breaths. Him and his squad were sent to capture Yohei so as to retrieve a vital piece of the Fear Robot but ends up failing when Shotaro intervenes, resulting in him getting fired. He reappears later on, taking a group of people hostage (with Mana being among them) in order to draw out Yohei and Shotaro, but the duo manages to beat him again to which he's then arrested and sent off to prison.

=== Other characters ===
Charisma Justice (カリスマジャスティス, Karisuma Jasutisu)
A famous superhero whom Shotaro idolizes and whose signature attack, Justice Blade, Shotaro copies. He is apparently a real person and very strong, as he was able to destroy the Fear Robot's right arm, whereas Shotaro could not even dent it. It is unknown whether he is a normal human, a Dokeshi, or something else entirely.
Tast Brothers (タスト兄弟, Tasuto Kyōdai)
Two Dokeshi brothers with the same ability and condition: to manipulate the water content of their body, which allows them to change shape as well as attack with water; afterwards, they must eat dried food. They tried to take over Toykyo (Tokyo) by impersonating the governor, but were stopped by Shotaro.
Christina S. Imbroglia (クリスティーナ・S・インブロリア, Kurisutīna Esu Inburoria)
A Dokeshi fortune teller whose ability and condition were not revealed, though her ability may be what enables her to predict the future.

== Media ==
=== Manga ===
Written and illustrated by Atsushi Ohkubo, B. Ichi was serialized in Enix's (later Square Enix) shōnen manga magazine Monthly Shōnen Gangan from October 12, 2001, to May 12, 2003. (Note: Finished in the magazine's June 2003 issue, released on May 12 of that same year.) Its chapters were collected in four tankōbon volumes, released from March 22, 2002, to June 21, 2003.

In North America, the manga was licensed for English release by Yen Press. The four volumes were released from October 2008 to September 2009. Square Enix added the series to its 'Manga Up! Global catalog in January 2026.

==== Volumes ====
No.	Original release date	Original ISBN	English release date	English ISBN
1	March 22, 2002	978-4-7575-0661-9	October 2008	978-0-7595-2977-9
2	July 22, 2002	978-4-7575-0734-0	January 2009	978-0-7595-2978-6
3	February 22, 2003	978-4-7575-0874-3	May 2009	978-0-7595-2979-3
4	June 21, 2003	978-4-7575-0965-8	September 2009	978-0-7595-2980-9

=== Drama CD ===
A drama CD adaptation was released by Frontier Works on November 21, 2007.
