= Atsushi Ohkubo =

Japanese manga artist

- Born: September 20, 1979 (age 47) Japan
- Area: Manga artist
- Notable works: Soul Eater; Fire Force

Atsushi Ohkubo (Japanese: 大久保 篤, Hepburn: Ōkubo Atsushi; born September 20, 1979) is a Japanese manga artist known for his work on the manga series Soul Eater and Fire Force, both of which have been adapted into anime television series. Ohkubo worked as an assistant under Rando Ayamine, on the manga series GetBackers. He also created some artworks for the video game TCG Lord of Vermilion, as well as some character designs in Bravely Default and Bravely Second: End Layer.

== Biography ==
Ohkubo was not a model student and was more attracted to drawing than to learning. At the age of 20, after finishing studies at a manga school where he met Rando Ayamine, the artist of GetBackers, he became Ayamine's assistant for two years. Finally, he won a competition at Square Enix's Gangan magazine with his first manga series B. Ichi and it was published in four volumes. After the end of his last manga, he created Soul Eater, still for Gangan, which brought him worldwide success. After that, he explored a little bit more of Soul Eater's world in Soul Eater Not!, a side-story to the main series that ended in 5 volumes. In 2015, he started working on Fire Force, published in Weekly Shōnen Magazine, making it the first weekly manga Ohkubo has done. In May 2020, Ohkubo announced that Fire Force would be his final manga. Ohkubo served as character designer for the 2023 anime series KamiErabi God.app.

== Works ==
- B. Ichi (B壱) (2001–2003) — Serialized in Square Enix's Monthly Shōnen Gangan.
- Soul Eater (ソウルイーター, Sōru Ītā) (2004–2013) — Serialized in Square Enix's Monthly Shōnen Gangan.
- Soul Eater Not! (ソウルイーターノット!, Sōru Ītā Notto!) (2011–2014) – Serialized in Square Enix's Monthly Shōnen Gangan.
- Fire Force (炎炎ノ消防隊, En'en no Shōbōtai) (2015–2022) – Serialized in Kodansha's Weekly Shōnen Magazine.

== Assistants ==
- Kei Urana (Gachiakuta)
- Tomoyuki Maru (Tripeace)
- Takatoshi Shiozawa (Full Moon)
- Takuzi Kato (Knight's & Magic)
- Yoshiki Tonogai (Doubt)
