= Sodl =

Austrian singer (born 2003)

- Born: Anja Sodnikar; 2003 (age 22–23); Salzkammergut, Austria
- Occupations: Singer; songwriter

Anja Sodnikar (born 2003), known professionally as Sodl, is an Austrian singer-songwriter.

== Career ==
After graduating from the BG/BRG Gmunden, Sodnikar moved to Vienna for her studies. At the age of 16, she presented her song "Rosemary" on the Austrian radio station FM4. Sodl's debut EP "Flowers on the Moon" was released in 2020. In September 2023, she embarked on a solo tour to Sweden. In November 2023, she opened for Buntspecht in a sold-out arena. At the 2025 Amadeus Austrian Music Awards, she was honored as the winner of the FM4 Award.

== Personal life ==
Sodnikar grew up in a musical family in Gmunden. She began playing the accordion at the age of seven, and at the age of 10, she switched to the Russian button accordion/bayan. She taught herself to play the guitar and sing at the age of 15. She had her first performance in September 2019 at the Slow Food Festival in Gmunden. She began playing concerts regularly in the summer of 2022.

== Discography ==
=== Studio albums ===
- 2025: Sheepman

=== EPs ===
- 2020: Flowers on the Moon

== Awards and nominations ==
Award	Year	Category	Nominee(s)	Result	Ref.
Amadeus Austrian Music Awards	2025	FM4 Award	Herself	Won	
