= Áine Brazil =

Irish engineer and architect

Áine Brazil is an Irish engineer.

A chartered engineer, Brazil is a fellow of Engineers Ireland and vice chair of Thornton Tomasetti, a New York engineering firm. A graduate of the University of Galway, Brazil won the award for International Engineer of the Year at the Engineers Ireland Excellence Awards in 2014. She was conferred with a Doctor of Engineering (honoris causa) by NUI Galway in June 2015.

Brazil was elected a member of the National Academy of Engineering in 2018 for her leadership in the design of innovative buildings and contributions to engineering literacy.
