= Hanasaku Iroha: The Movie – Home Sweet Home =

2013 Japanese animated film by Masahiro Andō

- Theatrical release poster
- Kanji: 劇場版 花咲くいろは HOME SWEET HOME
- Revised Hepburn: Gekijōban Hanasaku Iroha: Home Sweet Home
- Directed by: Masahiro Andō
- Screenplay by: Mari Okada
- Produced by: Yasushi Oshima; Shuichi Kitada; Takema Okamura; Yosuke Wada; Kenji Horikawa; Shigeru Saito; Tsuyoshi Oda; Kōsaku Sakamoto; Hiroshi Kawamura
- Starring: Kanae Itō; Chiaki Omigawa; Aki Toyosaki; Haruka Tomatsu; Mamiko Noto; Yuki Kaji; Takako Honda; Tamie Kubota; Kenji Hamada; Junji Majima; Taro Yamaguchi; Ayumi Tsunematsu; Junichi Suwabe; Chō
- Cinematography: Tomo Namiki
- Edited by: Ayumu Takahashi
- Music by: Shirō Hamaguchi
- Production companies: P.A. Works; Infinite
- Distributed by: Showgate
- Release dates: March 9, 2013 (Ishikawa Prefecture); March 30, 2013 (Japan)
- Running time: 66 minutes
- Country: Japan
- Language: Japanese
- Box office: ¥176 million (US$1.8 million)

Hanasaku Iroha: The Movie – Home Sweet Home (Japanese: 劇場版 花咲くいろは HOME SWEET HOME, Hepburn: Gekijōban Hanasaku Iroha: Home Sweet Home) is a 2013 Japanese animated film directed by Masahiro Andō from a script written by Mari Okada. Produced by P.A. Works and Infinite and distributed by Showgate, the film follows Ohana Matsumae finding logbooks that contain her mother Satsuki's history at Kissuiso.

Initially reported as an undisclosed visual work for Hanasaku Iroha (2011) in October 2011, it was confirmed to be an anime in December. Its title was revealed in March 2012. The format as a film was revealed in May 2012, with its staff and cast being announced that month.

Hanasaku Iroha: The Movie – Home Sweet Home premiered at Ishikawa Prefecture on March 9, 2013, and was released in Japan on March 30. The film grossed ¥176 million at the box office.

== Plot ==
During the autumn holidays, (Note: Set between twentieth and twenty-first episodes of Hanasaku Iroha (2011).) Ohana Matsumae is placed in charge of Yuina Wakura as she comes to Kissuiso to train to become an inn waitress. Whilst having to tidy away a mess Yuina had made in the storage room, Ohana comes across some old logbooks from the time when her mother Satsuki was working at the inn. In the past, Satsuki is rebellious against her mother Sui Shijima, and wants to move to Tokyo to get away from Kissuiso.

As she faces turmoil, Satsuki meets a cameraman, who shows her how radiant she looks from his perspective, and falls in love with him. This helps her pursue her goal as an editor and aim to go to Tokyo with Sui's approval and follow the man, who would later become Ohana's father. In the present, Ohana feels she has a lot more in common with her mother than she thought. Meanwhile, as Kissuiso is left without any power for the day, Nako Oshimizu learns her younger sister Mana has run away from home, so she and Ohana go search for her. After hearing Nako sound off at her mother for not being there for her family, reminding her of her problems with her mother, Ohana manages to figure out where Mana ran off to. After reuniting with Mana and returning to the inn, Ohana finds a little something about her in the logbooks. Meanwhile, Satsuki recalls the day she visited Kissuiso with the newly born Ohana, during which she became determined to not lose to Sui in terms of dedication.

== Voice cast ==
- Kanae Itō as Ohana Matsumae
- Chiaki Omigawa as Minko Tsurugi
- Aki Toyosaki as Nako Oshimizu
- Haruka Tomatsu as Yuina Wakura
- Tamie Kubota as Sui Shijima
- Kenji Hamada as Enishi Shijima
- Mamiko Noto as Tomoe Wajima
- Junji Majima as Tōru Miyagishi
- Taro Yamaguchi as Renji Togashi
- Ayumi Tsunematsu as Takako Kawajiri
- Junichi Suwabe as Tarō Jirōmaru
- Chō as Denroku Sukegawa
- Yuki Kaji as Kōichi Tanemura
- Ryōta Takeuchi as Ayato Matsumae
- Yuka Keichō as Mana Oshimizu
- Takako Honda as Satsuki Matsumae

== Production ==
Hokkoku Shimbun, a Japanese newspaper based in Ishikawa Prefecture, reported in October 2011 that a "new visual work" for the 2011 anime television series Hanasaku Iroha was set to be produced by its production committee, but the staff did not specify its type and format. The first volume of the manga series Hanasaku Iroha: Green Girls Graffiti by Jun Sasameyuki, which was released in December 2011, had a wrap-around jacket band that confirmed a new Hanasaku Iroha anime in the works. In March 2012, the title of the anime was revealed as Hanasaku Iroha: Home Sweet Home (花咲くいろは HOME SWEET HOME), with its key visual reporting that the production was "going smoothly".

In May 2012, the June issue of the magazine Gangan Joker revealed a detail about the anime confirming its format as a film. That month, the staff working on the film at P.A. Works were revealed, including Masahiro Andō as the director, Mari Okada as the screenwriter, Mel Kishida as the original character designer, Kanami Sekiguchi as the character designer, Tomo Namiki as the cinematographer, and Ayumu Takahashi as the editor. Studio Easter provided the background art for the film. Additionally, Kanae Itō, Chiaki Omigawa, Aki Toyosaki, Haruka Tomatsu, Mamiko Noto, Yuki Kaji, Takako Honda, Tamie Kubota, Kenji Hamada, Junji Majima, Taro Yamaguchi, Ayumi Tsunematsu, Junichi Suwabe, and Chō were set to reprise their voice roles from the anime series. In March and April 2013, Yuka Keichō and Ryōta Takeuchi respectively confirmed their casting in the film.

== Music ==
In May 2012, Shirō Hamaguchi was revealed to be composing Hanasaku Iroha: The Movie – Home Sweet Home. In December 2012, Nano Ripe was revealed to be performing the theme song "Shadow Stepping" (影踏み, Kagefumi) for the film. It was released as a single in Japan on March 6, 2013.

Hanasaku Iroha: The Movie – Home Sweet Home: Original Soundtrack CD track listing
No.	Title	Length
1.	"Ambience of a Smile" (微笑の空気)	1:36
2.	"Between Daily Life and Peace" (日常と平和の狭間で)	1:42
3.	"Delusion Is a Personal Choice" (妄想は個人の自由)	1:04
4.	"When the Speed of Feeling Is a Little Slow" (気持ちのスピードがちょっと遅い時)	1:48
5.	"I Don't Know How That's Possible" (そんなことってあるんだ感)	1:08
6.	"Think with a Distant Look" (遠い目で考える)	1:46
7.	"Longing Is Sudden" (憧れは突然に)	3:12
8.	"Behind the Growing Feelings" (募る想いの裏側に)	2:20
9.	"Time to Melt into the Sunset" (夕焼けに溶け込む時間)	1:51
10.	"Sometimes You Fall in Love" (恋する時もある)	2:22
11.	"Running with Unspeakable Feelings" (言葉に出来ない想いに、走る)	2:48
12.	"The Seeds of Joy" (愉快の種)	1:34
13.	"Time to Smile" (笑顔に至る時間)	1:42
14.	"Girls on the Run" (走りだす少女たち)	4:06
15.	"Vestiges Warp (Piano Arrangement)" (面影ワープ (ピアノアレンジ))	1:46
16.	"Like Grass Fluttering in a Gentle Breeze" (そよ風にたなびく草のように)	1:52
17.	"Relief Calls for Peace of Mind and Kindness" (安堵感は安心と優しさを呼ぶ)	2:14
18.	"Light Mood" (軽快なムード)	1:54
19.	"Joy, Kindness, and Warmth" (嬉しさ優しさ暖かさ)	1:36
20.	"Gentle Determination" (優しい決意)	2:06
Total length:		40:27

== Marketing ==
The first key visual for Hanasaku Iroha: The Movie – Home Sweet Home was revealed in March 2012, followed by a second one in May. A teaser trailer for the film was released on December 29, 2012. A full trailer was released on February 8, 2013. That month, Kanazawa and the Kanazawa City Tourism Association allowed an illustration for the film to be featured on the city's tourism poster. In March 2013, the film held a sticker rally event at restaurants in Hōdatsushimizu that gave support to the town's omurice project, and collaborated with Circle K Sunkus, Noto Railway, and Cure Maid Cafe in Akihabara.

== Release ==
=== Theatrical ===
Hanasaku Iroha: The Movie – Home Sweet Home held early screenings in four theaters at Kanazawa, Nonoichi, and Kahoku in Ishikawa Prefecture on March 9, 2013, and was released in Japan on March 30. It was previously scheduled to be released in 2012. The film was screened at the Festival of Japanese Cinema Florence (Italian: Rassegna di Cinema Giapponese Firenze) in Florence, Italy on May 22, 2013. NIS America screened the film at Anime Expo in Los Angeles, California on July 6, 2013.

=== Home media ===
Hanasaku Iroha: The Movie – Home Sweet Home was released on Blu-ray and DVD in Japan on October 16, 2013. The Blu-ray special edition is bundled with the film's original soundtrack and a booklet titled Hanairo Notebook: The Movie (花いろノートブック 劇場版). The film was broadcast in Japan on Kids Station on June 21, 2014, and on BS12 TwellV on January 24, 2021. Abema TV added the film for streaming on June 14, 2021, and Infinite's YouTube channel streamed it from October 3 to October 10. Infinite streamed the film again on their YouTube channel as part of a charity work on January 12, 2024, to help in recovery efforts in Ishikawa Prefecture following the earthquake that struck the prefecture on New Year's Day.

NIS America released the film on Blu-ray in the United States on October 14, 2014. Crunchyroll and Funimation added the film to their catalog in November 2020 and on March 12, 2021, respectively, which both made it available to stream in the United States and Canada. Tubi began streaming the film in November 2021.

== Reception ==
=== Box office ===
Hanasaku Iroha: The Movie – Home Sweet Home grossed ¥176 million (US$1.8 million) in Japan.

=== Critical response ===
Theron Martin of Anime News Network graded Hanasaku Iroha: The Movie – Home Sweet Home "A-", describing the film as "neither a summative movie nor a stand-alone production... Neither is this the continuation that some have been hoping for. It is, instead, a side story aimed entirely at established fans". Martin felt the background arts were "outstanding in detail", the character designs were "distinctive and interesting-looking", the musical score was "stylistically in line with the series... with a mix of themes recycled from the series and some new ones," and the runtime was "exactly right for the story that it wants to tell." Allen Moody of THEM Anime Reviews rated the film 4 out of 5 stars, feeling that it gave "just about everybody in the cast–and their characteristic foibles–some screen time, so it's a good short introduction to the show's cast and its general setup." Moody lauded Mari Okada's writing of "good dramatic scenes", particularly the story between Satsuki and Sui which "easily compensates for my reservations about some of the other characters", and described the theme song as "very sweet."
