= Hanasaku Iroha =

Japanese anime television series

- Promotional image of Hanasaku Iroha featuring (from left to right): Minko, Tomoe, Ohana, Yuina, and Nako.

花咲くいろは
- Genre: Coming-of-age, romantic comedy, slice of life
- Created by: P.A. Works
- Manga
- Written by: P.A. Works
- Illustrated by: Eito Chida
- Published by: Square Enix
- Magazine: Gangan Joker
- Original run: December 2010 – October 2012
- Volumes: 5
- Anime television series
- Directed by: Masahiro Andō
- Produced by: Kei Fukura; Yosuke Wada; Shigeru Saito; Tsuyoshi Oda; Yasushi Oshima; Kenji Horikawa; Takema Okamura; Shuichi Kitada; Takahiro Inagaki; Hiroshi Kawamura
- Written by: Mari Okada
- Music by: Shirō Hamaguchi
- Studio: P.A. Works
- Licensed by: BI: MVM Entertainment; NA: NIS America
- Original network: Tokyo MX
- Original run: April 3, 2011 – September 25, 2011
- Episodes: 26
- Manga

Hanasaku Iroha: Green Girls Graffiti
- Written by: P.A. Works
- Illustrated by: Jun Sasameyuki
- Published by: Bandai Visual
- Magazine: Web Comic Gekkin
- Original run: July 1, 2011 – July 2, 2012
- Volumes: 2
- Anime film
- Hanasaku Iroha: The Movie – Home Sweet Home
- icon

Hanasaku Iroha (花咲くいろは; lit. "The ABCs of Flower Blooming" or "The Blooming Colors"), or Hanairo for short, is a Japanese 26-episode anime television series produced by P.A. Works and directed by Masahiro Andō. The screenplay was written by Mari Okada, with original character design by Mel Kishida. P.A. Works produced the project as the studio's tenth anniversary work. The anime aired between April and September 2011 and had two manga adaptations created. An animated film was released in Japanese theaters on March 30, 2013.

== Plot ==
Hanasaku Iroha centers around Ohana Matsumae, a 16-year-old living in Tokyo, who is left in the care of her estranged maternal grandmother, following her mother's elopement with her boyfriend. Ohana arrives at her grandmother's country estate to realize she is the owner of a Taishō period hot spring inn called Kissuisō. She begins working at Kissuisō at her grandmother's request, but finds herself at odds with many employees and customers at the inn. Initially feeling discouraged, she decides to use her circumstances as an opportunity to change herself for the better and to make amends with her deteriorating relationship with the Kissuisō's staff for a more prominent future.

== Characters ==
Ohana Matsumae (松前 緒花, Matsumae Ohana)
Voiced by: Kanae Itō
Ohana is an energetic and optimistic 16-year-old girl and the main protagonist of Hanasaku Iroha. She is sent to live at her estranged grandmother's hot spring inn, Kissuisō, after her mother elopes with her boyfriend to evade his debt. Her best friend, Kōichi Tanemura, confessed his feelings to her before her departure, which was left unanswered until later in the series. At her grandmother's demand, she works at the inn as compensation for staying there. After parting with Koichi, she realized she has feelings for him, and she still hasn't admitted it yet. However, she is always dependent on him. She is a strong-willed girl who is stubborn and is realistic for her age. She likes to drink a mix of cola and black tea.
Minko Tsurugi (鶴来 民子, Tsurugi Minko)
Voiced by: Chiaki Omigawa
Minko is a 17-year-old chef apprentice and resident at Kissuisō. She is a tsundere, and dislikes Ohana from their first meeting, nicknaming her balut, the original Japanese term of which is Hobiron (ホビロン), an abbreviated phrase from one of the lines Minko jotted down in her notebook for an idea to address Ohana in lieu of "Die!": ("HOnto ni BIkkuri suruhodo RONgai"【ほ】んとうに【び】っくりするほど【論】外 "Truly Shockingly Out of the Question"). It is also a pun of the Vietnamese dish hột vịt lộn which is a turn-off for many. Minko (nicknamed Minchi by Nako) slowly accepts Ohana as a friend. Against her parents' wishes, her dream is to become a professional chef, resulting in her search for training opportunities. Her search led her to Kissuisō, where Tōru Miyagishi accepted her as a chef apprentice. Since then, she has developed strong feelings for him and becomes jealous when he talks about other girls, especially Ohana.
Nako Oshimizu (押水 菜子, Oshimizu Nako)
Voiced by: Aki Toyosaki
Nako is a shy and timid 17-year-old part-time maid and server at Kissuisō. She has three younger siblings whom she assists her parents in raising. She becomes close friends with Ohana and teaches her how to perform her duties. Nako is very good at swimming, due to she has had the nickname "Kappapa" since childhood, after the aquatic mythic creature, kappa. Ohana calls her Nakochi (no one else uses this nickname).
Yuina Wakura (和倉 結名, Wakura Yuina)
Voiced by: Haruka Tomatsu
Yuina is the 16-year-old daughter and heiress to the Fukuya Inn, the rival inn of Kissuisō. She is in the same high school as Ohana, Minko, and Nako, and is seen hanging out with them on several occasions. She is divided on the choice of whether to go on with her family's inn-running business, or to find herself a different career.
Kōichi Tanemura (種村 孝一, Tanemura Kōichi)
Voiced by: Yuki Kaji
Kōichi is a 16-year-old and Ohana's best friend. Kōichi confessed his feelings to Ohana before her departure, but was too afraid to hear her answer and ran away. He often offers support to Ohana when she feels down. He feels abandoned by Ohana as she adjusts to her new lifestyle. However, he realizes Ohana still harbors feeling for him and eventually tries to repair their relationship.
Sui Shijima (四十万 スイ, Shijima Sui)
Voiced by: Tamie Kubota, Takako Honda (young)
Ohana's 68-year-old grandmother and owner of Kissuisō. Behind her fierce and strict composure towards her employees (to the point of physically reprimanding them), Sui eventually reveals herself as comprehensive and caring toward them when most needed, thus earning not only obedience from them, but also respect and devotion.
Tomoe Wajima (輪島 巴, Wajima Tomoe)
Voiced by: Mamiko Noto
Tomoe is the 28-year-old head server working at Kissuisō. She enjoys hearing gossip about other employees and customers lodging at the inn. As a single woman near her thirties, Tomoe is usually reminded by her mother she should start looking for a husband and start a family.
Enishi Shijima (四十万 縁, Shijima Enishi)
Voiced by: Kenji Hamada
Ohana's 32-year-old uncle. He was bullied by Satsuki during their childhood. He often calls upon Takako and considers her his partner. The two marry late in the series. After Kissuisō's closure, Enishi plans to improve his management skills in order to succeed his mother.
Tōru Miyagishi (宮岸 徹, Miyagishi Tōru)
Voiced by: Junji Majima
A 23-year-old junior chef working at Kissuisō. He is very outspoken and easily frustrated. He strictly mentors and supervises Minko's training, often going too far with verbal abuse. Ohana was initially intimidated by him, but has since developed a dislike for him. However, Tōru appears to develop feelings toward Ohana, as he feels she is the only one who is willing to say she needs him. Afterwards, he is often seen looking out for Ohana, much to Minko's jealousy.
Renji Togashi (富樫 蓮二, Togashi Renji)
Voiced by: Taro Yamaguchi
A 42-year-old head chef working at Kissuisō and Tōru's mentor. He has a very gruff appearance, evidenced by a small facial scar, but has been shown to have a lighthearted side on occasion. He gets nervous very easily when under pressure, but is usually well-focused on his job.
Takako Kawajiri (川尻 崇子, Kawajiri Takako)
Voiced by: Ayumi Tsunematsu
A 30-year-old business consultant adviser for Kissuisō. She attended the same university as Enishi. She often has erratic plans to improve the inn and tends to spout out random English sayings. She eventually marries Enishi late in the series and takes on his family name as Takako Shijima.
Tarō Jirōmaru (次郎丸 太朗, Jirōmaru Tarō)
Voiced by: Junichi Suwabe
A 31-year-old novelist who frequently lodges at Kissuisō. He writes erotic novels using the Kissuisō's staff as character references. He eventually starts working at the inn after it is discovered he can't pay his bill. Ironically, his past works include a cooking manga which inspired both Minko and Tōru to become chefs themselves.
Denroku Sukegawa (助川 電六, Sukegawa Denroku)
Voiced by: Chō
A 73-year-old janitor and boiler maintenance man working at Kissuisō. He has been working at Kissuisō since its establishment and is in charge of Kissuiso's daily business journal. The staff call him "Beanman" "mamejii" (豆じい) because of a popular commercial bean snack by the same name as his.
Satsuki Matsumae (松前 皐月, Matsumae Satsuki)
Voiced by: Takako Honda, Kanae Itō (young)
Ohana's 38-year-old mother. She is a journalist who elopes with her boyfriend to evade his debt. She leaves Ohana to the care of her mother, who claims to have disowned her daughter. She neglected Ohana as a child and raised her with the mentality of relying on oneself. Satsuki is a talented freelance writer, being willing and able to write about virtually any subject upon request, among which are hotel and inn reviews with acerbic tones. She meets Ayato Matsumae (see below) as a high school student when Ayato was staying at Kissuiso.
Ayato Matsumae (松前 綾人, Matsumae Ayato)
Voiced by: Ryōta Takeuchi
He was Ohana's father, who died when Ohana was a baby. He was a photographer and inspired Satsuki to be an editor.

== Media ==
=== Manga ===
A manga adaptation, illustrated by Eito Chida, was serialized between the December 2010 and October 2012 issues of Square Enix's Gangan Joker magazine. Square Enix published five tankōbon volumes between March 22, 2011, and December 22, 2012. A spin-off manga with Minko Tsurugi as the main character, illustrated by Jun Sasameyuki and titled Hanasaku Iroha: Green Girls Graffiti, was serialization in Bandai Visual's online Web Comic Gekkin magazine between July 1, 2011 and July 2, 2012. Two volumes of Green Girls Graffiti were released between December 10, 2011, and July 10, 2012.

=== Novel ===
A spin-off novel, Hanasaku Iroha: The Place to Bloom One Day (花咲くいろは～いつか咲く場所～, Hanasaku Iroha Itsuka Saku Basho), an all-new story authored by Tohru Fujimoto and illustrated by Iroha Kohinata, covering a period seven years after the end of the anime and including all of the principal characters, was released in the e-book format by P.A. Books, a division of P.A. Works, in October 2020 and was serialized in six parts. The paper edition, which includes revisions to the e-book version and additional materials, was published in two volumes by parubooks in July 2022.

=== Anime ===
The Hanasaku Iroha 26-episode anime television series is produced by P.A. Works and directed by Masahiro Andō. The series aired in Japan between April 3 and September 25, 2011, on Tokyo MX. The screenplay was written by Mari Okada, and chief animator Kanami Sekiguchi based the character design used in the anime on Mel Kishida's original designs. Sound direction was headed by Jin Aketagawa and the music was produced by Shirō Hamaguchi. The anime series was simulcast in the United States, Canada, the United Kingdom, Ireland, Australia, New Zealand, Sweden, Denmark, Norway, Finland, Iceland, Netherlands, Brazil, and Portugal by the Internet streaming website Crunchyroll. The series has been licensed in North America by NIS America under the title Hanasaku Iroha: Blossoms for Tomorrow. The first Blu-ray/DVD combo pack was released on April 9, 2013, and the second part was released on July 2, 2013. MVM Entertainment acquired distribution rights to the title in the United Kingdom and Ireland.

An anime film titled Hanasaku Iroha: The Movie – Home Sweet Home was released in Japanese theaters on March 30, 2013. At Anime Expo 2013, NIS America announced the rights to distribute the film in North America.

==== Music ====
An image song titled "Patricia" (パトリシア, Patorishia) by Nano Ripe was used for the promotional videos and anime; the single was released on September 22, 2010, by Lantis. Another promotional video featured the image song "Yumeji" (夢路; "Dreaming") by Nano Ripe. For the first 13 episodes, the opening theme song is "Hana no Iro" (ハナノイロ; "The Color of a Flower") by Nano Ripe, and the main ending theme is "Hazy" by Sphere. For episodes 14 onwards, the opening theme is "Omokage Warp" (面影ワープ, Omokage Wāpu; "Trace Warp") by Nano Ripe, while the ending theme is "Hanasaku Iroha" (はなさくいろは; "Blooming Colors") by Clammbon. Nano Ripe provided several more ending theme songs: "Tsukikage to Buranko" (月影とブランコ; "Swing with the Moonlight") for episode 6, "Yumeji" for episodes 8 and 26, "Saibō Kioku" (細胞キオク; "Cellular Memories") for episode 11, and "High Leap" (ハイリープ, Hai Rīpu) for episode 22.

== Reception ==
The series received generally positive reviews. Mania praised Kanae Itō's voice as Ohana, the animation quality, and execution of the plot. The reviewer however commented that the beginning was not new nor innovative. Anime News Network praised the realism and quality in the animation, score, and opening and ending theme music. The character designs were noted to be attractive yet subtle enough to retain the realism, and also noted how Ohana's design is much better than a moe clone. As the characters' personality developed, the reviewer highly praised the realistic interactions between them as they are touching and substantial. Ohana's relationship with her mother and grandmother was noted to be especially well written with daunting emotions. After reviewing the second half of the series, the reviewer considered Hanasaku Iroha to be one of the best titles in 2011. Hanasaku Iroha received a Jury Selection award in the Animation division of the 15th Japan Media Arts Festival.

== Impact ==
=== Creation of Yuwaku Bonbori Festival ===
Hanasaku Iroha also had the effect of attracting fans of the show to visit the Yuwaku Onsen in Kanazawa, Ishikawa, the inspiration for the show's setting. Increased general interest culminates in the Yuwaku Bonbori Festival, held yearly around October. In the anime, the preparation and celebration of the fictional Bonbori Festival was a major plot point. In 2011, shortly after the show finished airing, the town of Yuwaku decided to bring this Festival into reality where there had previously been no equivalent celebration. In addition to typical Japanese festival attractions, the organizers also included a procession of participants carrying paper bonbori lanterns and a burning of ema plaques with participants' wishes written on them, both of which are distinguishing characteristics of the festival as shown in the anime.

During the festival, the town's inns are sold out and attendees number over 15,000 for more recent iterations. Originally, the festival was organized by individuals associated with P.A. Works. More recently, the town has attempted to broaden the appeal of the festival to beyond anime fans, including by inviting traditional musicians.

=== Response to Noto earthquake ===
Infinite's YouTube channel streamed all episodes of the series as part of a charity work on January 12, 2024, with proceeds from it to be used for recovery in Ishikawa Prefecture following the earthquake that struck the prefecture on New Year's Day.
