= Nano Ripe =

Japanese pop rock duo

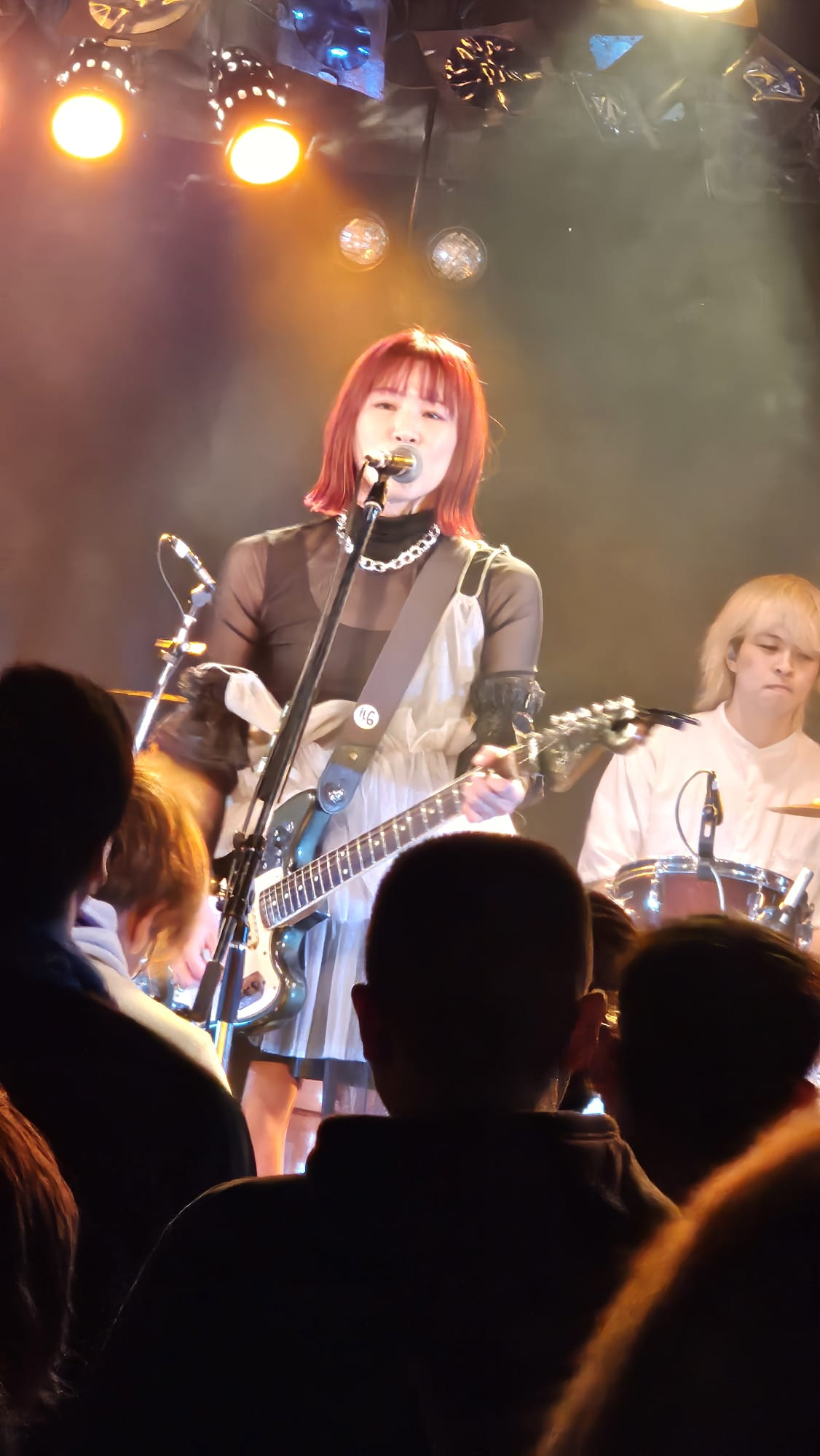
- Nano Ripe at Que's Countdown 2025

Background information
- Origin: Japan
- Genre: Pop rock
- Years active: 1998–present
- Label: Lantis
- Members: Kimiko; Jun Sasaki
- Past members: Shinn; Nobuyuki Abe; Yūki Aoyama
- Website: nanoripe.com

Nano Ripe (styled as nano.RIPE) is a Japanese pop rock duo that formed in 1998 as an indie band. They released three singles and four mini-albums before being signed to Lantis in 2010. Although the core of the band is made up of Kimiko (composition, lyrics, vocals, guitar) and Jun Sasaki (composition, guitar), when they debuted on Lantis in 2010, the band also consisted of bassist Nobuyuki Abe and drummer Shinn. Shinn left the band in 2011, but Yūki Aoyama joined the band as the drummer in 2013. Abe and Aoyama left the band in 2016.

Following the release of their major debut single "Patricia" (2010), they released four more singles from 2010 to 2011; all five were featured on their major debut album Hoshi no Yoru no Myaku no Oto no (2011). Their next three studio albums were Plus to Minus no Shikumi (2012), Namida no Ochiru Sokudo (2013), and Nanairo Megane no Himitsu (2014). After the release of their compilation album Shiawase no Kutsu (2015), they released their fifth studio album Space Echo (2016) and their sixth studio album Pippala no Ki no Shita de (2018). This was followed by their second compilation album Tsuki ni Sumu Hoshi no Uta: Nano Ripe 10th Anniversary Best (2020) and their seventh studio album Fuminshō no Neko to Yoru (2022). Their eighth studio album is Hikari o Hakobu Mono (2025).

== Members ==
- Kimiko (きみコ) (composition, lyrics, vocals, guitar)
- Jun Sasaki (ササキ ジュン, Sasaki Jun) (composition, guitar)

Past members

- Shinn (drums)
- Nobuyuki Abe (アベ ノブユキ, Abe Nobuyuki) (bass)
- Yūki Aoyama (青山 友樹, Aoyama Yūki) (drums)

== History ==
=== 1998–2014 ===
Nano Ripe formed in 1998 with Kimiko and Jun Sasaki as an indie band. They released their first two singles independently: "Kiminchi e / "Kimi no Uta" (きみんちへ/キミノウタ) on October 31, 2004, and "Tricycle Rider" in April 2006. Their first two mini-albums were also released independently: Aoiro Pouch (青色パウチ) on March 12, 2007, and 88 on March 7, 2008. Their next two mini-albums were released by White Dream: Soratobu Kutsu (空飛ぶクツ) on September 10, 2008, and Jikū Flask (時空フラスコ) on May 13, 2009. Their next single "Sekai Ten" (世界点) was also released by White Dream on November 25, 2009. By January 2010, bassist Nobuyuki Abe had joined the band.

Nano Ripe was signed to Lantis in 2010, and released their major debut single "Patricia" (パトリシア) on September 22, 2010. They released their second single "Flash Keeper" (フラッシュキーパー) on December 22, 2010. Their third single "Hana no Iro" (ハナノイロ) was released on April 20, 2011; the title song was used as the opening theme of the anime series Hanasaku Iroha. They released their fourth single "Saibō Kioku" (細胞キオク) on June 29, 2011. Their fifth single "Omokage Warp" (面影ワープ) followed on August 3, 2011 and the title song is used as the second opening theme of Hanasaku Iroha. Their major debut album Hoshi no Yoru no Myaku no Oto no (星の夜の脈の音の) was released on October 19, 2011. The drummer Shinn left the band on November 12, 2011.

Nano Ripe released their sixth single "Yuki no Sei" (ゆきのせい) on January 31, 2012, limited to 1,000 copies. Nano Ripe released "Esoragoto" (絵空事) as their seventh single on April 25, 2012; the title song is used as the opening theme of the anime series Sankarea. The band's eighth single "Real World" (リアルワールド) was released on July 25, 2012; the title song is used as the opening theme of the anime series Humanity Has Declined. Nano Ripe's second studio album Plus to Minus no Shikumi (プラスとマイナスのしくみ) was released on October 3, 2012. Their ninth single "Moshimo no Hanashi" (もしもの話) was released on October 31, 2012; the title song is used as the opening theme of the third season of the anime series Bakuman. Yūki Aoyama became a support drummer for the band in February 2013 and officially joined the band the following month.

Nano Ripe's tenth single "Kagefumi" (影踏み) was released on March 6, 2013; the song is used as the theme song to the 2013 anime film Hanasaku Iroha: The Movie – Home Sweet Home. Nano Ripe's 11th single "Sankaku e.p." (サンカク e.p.) was released on May 22, 2013; the three songs from the single are used as ending themes of the 2013 anime series The Devil Is a Part-Timer!. The band's 12th single "Nanairo Biyori" (なないろびより) was released on October 30, 2013; the song is used as the opening theme to the 2013 anime series Non Non Biyori. Nano Ripe's third studio album Namida no Ochiru Sokudo (涙の落ちる速度) was released on January 8, 2014. Nano Ripe's 13th single "Tōmei na Sekai" (透明な世界) was released on July 23, 2014; the song is used as the ending theme to the 2014 anime series Glasslip.

=== 2015–present ===
Nano Ripe's fourth studio album Nanairo Megane no Himitsu (七色眼鏡のヒミツ) was released on April 8, 2015. Included on the album is a cover of Spitz's song "Hotaru" (ホタル). Nano Ripe's 14th single "Kodama Kotodama" (こだまことだま) was released on July 22, 2015; the song is used as the opening theme to the 2015 anime series Non Non Biyori Repeat. Nano Ripe released their first compilation album Shiawase no Kutsu (シアワセのクツ) on September 23, 2015. Nano Ripe's 15th single "Lime Tree" (ライムツリー) was released on February 24, 2016; the song is used as the ending theme to the 2016 anime series Undefeated Bahamut Chronicle. Nano Ripe made their North American debut at Anime Boston in March 2016. The band's 16th single "Snowdrop" (スノードロップ) was released on August 3, 2016; the song is used as the ending theme to the 2016 anime series Food Wars! Shokugeki no Soma: The Second Plate. Nano Ripe's fifth studio album Space Echo (スペースエコー) was released on October 19, 2016. The bassist Nobuyuki Abe and drummer Yūki Aoyama left the band in late 2016. Aoyama later died in August 2018.

Nano Ripe's 17th single "Yoru no Taiyō" (夜の太陽) was released on April 29, 2017, and was only available during events on Nano Ripe's 2017 tour Seinaru Tanebi (せいなるたねび). The band's 18th single "Kyokyo Jitsujitsu" (虚虚実実) was released on November 15, 2017; the song is used as the ending theme to the 2017 anime series Food Wars! Shokugeki no Soma: The Third Plate. Nano Ripe's 19th single "Azalea" (アザレア) was released on February 7, 2018; the song is used as the opening theme to the 2018 anime series Citrus. Nano Ripe's song "Ao no Rakugaki" (あおのらくがき) is used as the opening theme song to the 2018 anime film Non Non Biyori Vacation. Nano Ripe's sixth studio album Pippala no Ki no Shita de (ピッパラの樹の下で) was released on August 29, 2018. The digital single "I See" (アイシー) was released on May 3, 2019, followed by the band's 20th single "Yorugao" (ヨルガオ) on August 21, 2019. Their 21st single "Emblem" (エンブレム) was released on November 6, 2019; the song is used as the ending theme to the 2019 anime series Food Wars! Shokugeki no Soma: The Fourth Plate.

Nano Ripe's 22nd single "Last Chapter" (ラストチャプター) was released on April 22, 2020; the song is used as the opening theme to the 2020 anime series Food Wars! Shokugeki no Soma: The Fifth Plate. They released their second compilation album Tsuki ni Sumu Hoshi no Uta: Nano Ripe 10th Anniversary Best (月に棲む星のうた ～nano.RIPE 10th Anniversary Best～) on September 23, 2020. Nano Ripe's song "Tsugihagi Moyō" (つぎはぎもよう, Patchwork Pattern) was released on the Non Non Biyori theme song compilation album Non Non Biyori Days (のんのんびよりでいず) on February 24, 2021; the song is used as the opening theme to the 2021 anime series Non Non Biyori Nonstop. Their digital mini album Chiisana Inori no Sho (小さな祈りの書) was released on November 5, 2021. Nano Ripe's seventh studio album Fuminshō no Neko to Yoru (不眠症のネコと夜) was released on October 12, 2022. Another mini album, Hikari no Nai Machi (光のない街), was released on August 23, 2023; the title track is used as the opening theme to the latter half of the second season of The Devil Is a Part-Timer!. Their eighth studio album Hikari o Hakobu Mono (光を運ぶもの) was released on March 12, 2025.

== Discography ==
=== Albums ===
==== Studio albums ====
Year	Album details	Peak Oricon chart positions
2007	Aoiro Pouch: Released: March 12, 2007; Format: CD	—
2008	88: Released: March 7, 2008; Format: CD	—
2008	Soratobu Kutsu: Released: September 10, 2008; Format: CD	—
2009	Jikū Flask: Released: May 13, 2009; Format: CD	—
2011	Hoshi no Yoru no Myaku no Oto no: Released: October 19, 2011; Label: Lantis (LACA-15150, LACA-35150); Format: CD, CD+DVD	39
2012	Plus to Minus no Shikumi: Released: October 3, 2012; Label: Lantis (LACA-15237, LACA-35237); Format: CD, CD+DVD	35
2014	Namida no Ochiru Sokudo: Released: January 8, 2014; Label: Lantis (LACA-15370, LACM-35369, LACM-35370); Format: CD	17
2015	Nanairo Megane no Himitsu: Released: April 8, 2015; Label: Lantis (LACA-15481, LACA-35481); Format: CD, CD+DVD	26
2016	Space Echo: Released: October 19, 2016; Label: Lantis (LACA-15580, LACA-35580); Format: CD, CD+DVD	48
2018	Pippala no Ki no Shita de: Released: August 29, 2018; Label: Lantis (LACA-15736, LACA-35736); Format: CD, CD+DVD	52
2021	Chiisana Inori no Sho: Released: November 5, 2021; Label: Lantis (LZC-2036); Format: CD	—
2022	Fuminshō no Neko to Yoru: Released: October 12, 2022; Label: Lantis (LACA-25018); Format: CD	135
2023	Hikari no Nai Machi: Released: August 23, 2023; Label: Lantis (LACA-25066, LACA-25067); Format: CD	—
2025	Hikari o Hakobu Mono: Released: March 12, 2025; Label: Lantis (LACA-25147); Format: CD	
"—" denotes releases that did not chart or were ineligible to chart.

==== Compilation albums ====
Year	Album details	Peak Oricon chart positions
2015	Shiawase no Kutsu: Released: September 23, 2015; Label: Lantis (LACA-15514, LACA-35514); Format: CD, CD+DVD	33
2020	Tsuki ni Sumu Hoshi no Uta: Nano Ripe 10th Anniversary Best: Released: September 23, 2020; Label: Lantis (LACA-9778–9779); Format: CD	34

=== Singles ===
Year	Song	Peak Oricon chart positions	Album
2004	"Kiminchi e"	—	Non-album single
2004	"Kimi no Uta"	—	Non-album single
2006	"Tricycle Rider"	—	Non-album single
2009	"Sekai Ten"	—	Hoshi no Yoru no Myaku no Oto no
2010	"Patricia"	—	Hoshi no Yoru no Myaku no Oto no
2010	"Flash Keeper"	—	Hoshi no Yoru no Myaku no Oto no
2011	"Hana no Iro"	15	Hoshi no Yoru no Myaku no Oto no
2011	"Saibō Kioku"	59	Hoshi no Yoru no Myaku no Oto no
2011	"Omokage Warp"	34	Hoshi no Yoru no Myaku no Oto no
2012	"Yuki no Sei"	—	Plus to Minus no Shikumi
2012	"Esoragoto"	52	Plus to Minus no Shikumi
2012	"Real World"	26	Plus to Minus no Shikumi
2012	"Moshimo no Hanashi"	85	Namida no Ochiru Sokudo
2013	"Kagefumi"	33	Namida no Ochiru Sokudo
2013	"Sankaku e.p."	35	Namida no Ochiru Sokudo
2013	"Nanairo Biyori"	27	Namida no Ochiru Sokudo
2014	"Tōmei na Sekai"	29	Nanairo Megane no Himitsu
2015	"Kodama Kotodama"	35	Space Echo
2016	"Lime Tree"	48	Space Echo
2016	"Snowdrop"	100	Space Echo
2017	"Yoru no Taiyō"	—	Pippala no Ki no Shita de
2017	"Kyokyo Jitsujitsu"	92	Pippala no Ki no Shita de
2018	"Azalea"	59	Pippala no Ki no Shita de
2019	"I See"	—	Tsuki ni Sumu Hoshi no Uta: Nano Ripe 10th Anniversary Best
2019	"Yorugao"	144	Tsuki ni Sumu Hoshi no Uta: Nano Ripe 10th Anniversary Best
2019	"Emblem"	126	Tsuki ni Sumu Hoshi no Uta: Nano Ripe 10th Anniversary Best
2020	"Last Chapter"	41	Fuminshō no Neko to Yoru
2022	"Hana Akari"	—	
2025	"Shizuku"	—	
"—" denotes releases that did not chart or were ineligible to chart.

=== Music videos ===
Year	Song	Director
2010	"Patricia"	Jūichi Banba
2010	"Flash Keeper"	Jūichi Banba
2011	"Hana no Iro"	Jūichi Banba
2011	"Saibō Kioku"	Akiko Fukada
2011	"Omokage Warp"	Jūichi Banba
2011	"Seratona"	Yasunori Kakegawa
2012	"Esoragoto"	Atsushi Tani
2012	"Real World"	Atsushi Tani
2012	"Number Zero"	Yasunori Kakegawa
2012	"Moshimo no Hanashi"	Atsushi Tani
2013	"Tsumabiku Hitori"	Kenji Kiyama
2013	"Nanairo Biyori"	Tōru Nomura
2014	"Hello"	Satoshi Takaki
2014	"Tōmei na Sekai"	Nanae Takanashi
2015	"Kotaeawase"	Ryōji Aoki
2015	"Kodama Kotodama"	Shin Okawa
2015	"Chikyū ni Hari"	Ryōji Aoki
2016	"Lime Tree"	Kenji Kiyama
2016	"Snowdrop"	Seiji Kitahira
2016	"Luminary"	Shin Okawa
2017	"Kyokyo Jitsujitsu"	Takayuki Koizumi
2018	"Azalea"	Tetsuo Inoue
2018	"Polaris"	Takayuki Koizumi
2019	"Yorugao"	Mitsuo Toyama
2019	"Emblem"	Hideaki Fukui
2020	"Last Chapter"	Kenji Kiyama
2020	"Lily Reviver"	Miku Nakajima
2020	"Orb"	Mitsuo Toyama
2020	"Itoshiki Hibi"	Emiri Torihata
2020	"Spica"	Emiri Torihata
2021	"Hana ni Ame"	Mitsuo Toyama
2021	"Seimeibun"	Kō Kanoto

=== Other album appearances ===
Year	Song	Album	Notes	Ref.
2011	"Hatch"	Yunosagi Relations	Image song for the character Minko Tsurugi from the anime television series Hanasaku Iroha.	
2012	"Esoragoto"	Sankarea Original Soundtrack	TV size version for theme song to the anime television series Sankarea.	
2012	"Real World"	Jinrui wa Suitaishimashita Original Soundtrack	TV size version for the theme song to the anime television series Humanity Has Declined.	
2013	"Hana no Iro" "Omokage Warp" "Yumeji"	Yunosagi Best Songs	A compilation album of theme songs to the anime television series Hanasaku Iroha.	
2013	"Gekka" "Star Chart" "Tsumabiku Hitori"	Hataraku Maō-sama! Original Soundtrack	TV size versions for theme songs to the anime television series The Devil Is a Part-Timer!.	
2013	"Nanairo Biyori"	Non Non Biyori Original Soundtrack	TV size version for the theme song to the anime television series Non Non Biyori.	
2016	"Lime Tree"	Saijaku Muhai no Bahamut Original Soundtrack	TV size version for the theme song to the anime television series Undefeated Bahamut Chronicle.	
2018	"Azalea"	Citrus Original Soundtrack: To fear love is to fear life	TV size version for the theme song to the anime television series Citrus.	
2021	"Tsugihagi Moyō"	Non Non Biyori Days	Theme song to the anime television series Non Non Biyori Nonstop.	

==== Additional songs ====
Year	Song	Artist	Album	Notes	Ref.
2011	"Hatch"	Chiaki Omigawa (as Minako Tsurugi)	"Namida de Saku Hana"	Character song single for the anime series Hanasaku Iroha.	
2014	"Loupe"	Kanae Itō	"Loupe"	Kanae Itō's ninth single.	
2014	"Praline"	Aimi (as Julia)	The Idolmaster Live Theater Harmony 04	Compilation album for The Idolmaster Million Live!.	
2015	"Shōnen Brave"	Kimiko (vocals); Jin (composition)	Mekakucity M's: Mekakucity Actors Vocal and Sound Collection	Vocaloid song from Kagerou Project.	
2016	"Aisle"	Machico (as Tsubasa Ibuki)	The Idolmaster Million Live! 3 Original CD	Included on a CD bundled with the special edition version of the third volume of the manga series The Idolmaster Million Live! by Yuki Monji.	
2022	"Mizukagami no Sekai"	Marina Horiuchi	"Mizukagami no Sekai"	Marina Horiuchi's debut single.	
