= Undefeated Bahamut Chronicle =

Japanese light novel series and its adaptations

- First light novel volume cover, featuring Lux Arcadia (left) and Lisesharte Atismata (right)

最弱無敗の神装機竜(バハムート) (Saijaku Muhai no Bahamūto)
- Genre: Fantasy, mecha
- Light novel
- Written by: Senri Akatsuki
- Illustrated by: Ayumu Kasuga (2013–2018); Yuichi Murakami (2019–2020)
- Published by: SB Creative
- Imprint: GA Bunko
- Original run: August 12, 2013 – August 6, 2020
- Volumes: 20
- Manga
- Written by: Senri Akatsuki; Itsuki Watanabe
- Illustrated by: Fumi Tadaura
- Published by: Square Enix
- Imprint: Gangan Comics Online
- Magazine: Gangan Online
- Original run: July 17, 2014 – May 11, 2018
- Volumes: 11
- Anime television series
- Directed by: Masaomi Ando
- Written by: Yuuko Kakihara
- Music by: Akito Matsuda
- Studio: Lerche
- Licensed by: AUS: Madman Entertainment; NA: Sentai Filmworks; UK: MVM Films
- Original network: AT-X, Tokyo MX, Sun TV, KBS, TV Aichi, BS11
- Original run: January 11, 2016 – March 28, 2016
- Episodes: 12
- icon

Undefeated Bahamut Chronicle (最弱無敗の神装機竜(バハムート), Saijaku Muhai no Bahamūto; lit. 'Undefeated Weakest Bahamut') is a Japanese light novel series, written by Senri Akatsuki and illustrated by Ayumu Kasuga and Yuichi Murakami. SB Creative published twenty volumes from August 2013 to August 2020 under their GA Bunko imprint. A manga adaptation written by Itsuki Watanabe, with art by Fumi Tadauri, was serialized by Square Enix and GA Bunko's online magazine Gangan Online from July 2014 to May 2018. It has been collected in eleven tankōbon volumes. A 12-episode anime television series adaptation by Lerche aired from January to March 2016.

== Plot ==
Five years ago, a revolt has overthrown the Arcadia empire. The empire's former prince, Lux Arcadia, accidentally trespasses in a female-only bathing area, and witnesses the new kingdom's princess Lisesharte Atismata naked and her secret. After a duel with Lisesharte, Lux attends the female-only academy where they train students to become royal Drag-Knights. There, it is discovered that he is the Black Hero who single-handedly destroyed an entire army.

== Characters ==
Lux Arcadia (ルクス・アーカディア, Rukusu Ākadia)
Voiced by: Mutsumi Tamura
Lux is the seventh crown Prince of the Arcadia Empire, which was destroyed in a revolt five years prior to the start of the series, and nicknamed "The Weakest Undefeated Drag-Knight" due to having never lost a fight (all his fights end in draws). He is later revealed to be the dangerous and mysterious "Black Hero" who destroyed 1200 drag-rides of the empire during the coup d'etat and single-handedly ended the war in the process. He wields a Wyvern Drag-Ride and the Divine Drag-Ride "Bahamut". His mother died in a carriage accident when he was young, and the people refused to help him out of resentment towards the royal family, with only Philuffy showing him kindness. He failed to reason with his father the emperor about the people's suffering, and his older brother Fugil convinced him of participate in the coup to protect Philuffy, only for his brother to betray him by killing the emperor and the royal court, leaving him and Airi to pay for the debt towards the old kingdom. He is also engaged to Krulcifer.
Lisesharte Atismata (リーズシャルテ・アティスマータ, Rīzusharute Atisumāta)
Voiced by: Lynn
One of the four heroines, called "Lisha" for short. Nicknamed "The Scarlet War Princess" and wields the Divine Drag-Ride "Tiamat". She is the princess of the Kingdom of Atismata. She duels Lux over his freedom after an incident in the academy's bath and after he saves her life during an attack from an insurgent group, she falls in love with him; she blushes anytime she's around him and gets jealous when other girls get close to him. She is the first person in the series, besides Airi and Fugil, to learn that Lux is the legendary "Black Hero". She bears the crest of the former imperial family below her navel, something she can't allow anyone to see. She implies early on that the real reason she challenged him to a duel when they first met was because he may have seen the crest. Her father, Count Atismata, was the instigator of the coup and abandoned her at a young age but died during the war along with her sister while her mother died from an illness leaving her orphaned. As a result, her aunt became the current queen of the New Kingdom and adopted Lisha thus making her the princess. However, because of her tragic past and the circumstances by which she gained her position, she does not know how to behave like a princess and even dislikes her position until she met Lux. Now, she falls in love with Lux.
Krulcifer Einfolk (クルルシファー・エインフォルク, Kururushifā Einforuku)
Voiced by: Yukiyo Fujii
One of the four heroines. The adopted daughter of the Einfolk House from the northern religious country of Ymir. She wields the Divine Drag-Ride "Fafnir". She's the last survivor of the people from the Ruins, so various nobles of numerous kingdoms are after her because she can unlock the ruins and its lost technology. She was to be married to Kreutzer Balzeride, but after Lux defeats Balzeride in a duel, she falls in love with him, while her adoptive family sees Lux as a good match. Highly intelligent and clever, she likes teasing Lux and even kissed him twice in front of Lisha upon the announcement of their engagement.
Philuffy Aingram (フィルフィ・アイングラム, Firufi Ainguramu)
Voiced by: Yurika Kubo
One of the four heroines. Lux's childhood friend who looks frail, has a notably large bust, and wears a constantly sleepy expression on her face. She wields the Divine Drag-Ride "Typhon". She comes from the powerful and influential Aingram merchant house and took Lux and Airi in after their mother's death. It is revealed that Philuffy was a victim of human experimentation using poisons and weapons by military authorities by the old Arcadia Empire who ignored her sister Relie's pleas for her release. It was this incident that made Lux decide to join Fugil's coup d'etat and pilot the "Bahamut" though he has since forgotten the incident after several years. As a result of the experiments, she is slowly mutating into an Abyss which Hayes uses to make Lux unlock the deepest area of the ruins but he eventually thwarts her. She has been in love with Lux since they were small.
Celistia Ralgris (セリスティア・ラルグリス, Serisutia Rarugurisu)
Voiced by: Risa Taneda
One of the four heroines. She's a young woman of the Duke House, one of the four Great Nobles is infamous for being a man-hater. She wields the Drag-Ride "Lindworm" and is considered to be the strongest and most influential in the academy. She later confessed to a cross-dressing Lux that she actually doesn't hate men; she simply doesn't know how to interact with men her age. She was tutored by Lux's maternal grandfather and felt guilty that he was imprisoned for trying to reform the Empire's policies, dying in prison. After Lux saves her from the Ragnarok and confesses the truth, he comments that he doesn't blame her, while revealing the truth about the cross dressing. She forgives Lux for the deceit, while also falling in love with him.
Yoruka Kirihime (切姫 夜架, Kirihime Yoruka)
Voiced by: Shizuka Ishigami
Formerly Lux's father's personal assassin, she now pledges her loyalty to Lux due to her promise made with the royal family. Nicknamed the "Empire's Assassin Blade", she calls Lux, "Master". She wields the Drag-Ride "Yato no Kami". Upon realizing that Lux has no desire to reform the Arcadia Empire, she turns on him and they later battle in one of the ruins but Lux defeats her by distracting her for a split second. She rejoins him afterwards, and becomes the fifth heroine.
Airi Arcadia (アイリ・アーカディア, Airi Ākadia)
Voiced by: Ari Ozawa
Lux's little sister. She seems to love him more than a sister normally should, but she's not afraid to berate him. She also dislikes it when Lux puts himself in harm's way or if he is constantly pushing himself for her or someone else. She also tells anyone within hearing range about her brother's abilities (usually Noct) whenever he's in an important combat. She does her part to help pay for their family's debt to the New Kingdom by working as a researcher and scholar of the ruins within the academy.
Relie Aingram (レリィ・アイングラム, Reryi Ainguramu)
Voiced by: Yoko Hikasa
Relie is the principal of Royal Officer Academy and Philuffy's older sister. She likes teasing Lux and supports him entering into a relationship with Philuffy. After Philuffy was subjected to human experiments by the Empire, Relie, who is aware of what her sister is becoming, made it her job to find a cure for her in the ruins and is not above using the students for this purpose.
Shalice Baltshift (シャリス・バルトシフト, Sharisu Barutoshifuto)
Voiced by: Yumi Uchiyama
The leader of Triad, a group made up of her childhood friends. She is a third year, is the oldest of the Triad, and is Celes' roommate. She pilots a Wyvern.
Tillfur Lilmit (ティルファー・リルミット, Tirufā Rirumitto)
Voiced by: Shiori Izawa
One of the members of the Triad with a bubbly and energetic personality. She is a second year and is classmates with Lux, Lisha, and Philuffy. She pilots a Wyrm.
Noct Leaflet (ノクト・リーフレット, Nokuto Rīfuretto)
Voiced by: Rie Takahashi
One of the members of the Triad who pilots a Drake. She is Airi's roommate and best friend. She often begins her sentences with "Yes" or "No". She also takes an interest in Lux because of his seemly blatant disinterest in her.
Fugil Arcadia (フギル・アーカディア, Fugiru Ākadia)
Voiced by: Ryota Osaka
Lux and Airi's older half brother, former First Prince of the Arcadia Empire and the original pilot of Bahamut, who serves the Holy Arcadia princesses for unknown reasons. During the coup, he killed his father the emperor and the entire imperial court, while Lux was busy fighting the 1200 drag knight bodyguards outside. He is later revealed to be an ancient member of the Arcadia family preserved via cold sleep, but unlike the Holy Arcadia princesses, he has been alive long enough to meet the creator of Sacred Eclipse. He wields the Divine Drag-ride "Uroboros".
Kreutzer Balzeride (バルゼリッド・クロイツァー, Baruzeriddo Kuroitsā)
Voiced by: Junji Majima
A noble of the Four Great Nobles. His Divine Drag Ride is "Aži Dahāka", which allows him to steal the armaments, abilities and energy of other Drag Rides when it comes into physical contact with it. He looks down on the girls of the academy and sees Krulcifer as nothing more than a tool to unlock the ruins, but the arranged marriage is cancelled after Lux defeats him in a duel with the condition being Krulcifer's engagement. He is later imprisoned when Lux and the others expose his treachery of hiring a private army in an attempt to kill Lux and threaten Krulcifer into silence. He is later killed by Hayes in prison for his failure.
Hayes (ヘイズ, Heizu)
Voiced by: Hisako Kanemoto
A strategist of the Heiburg Republic and one of the series' main antagonists. She is also a black marketeer who provides arms to aristocrats all over the world so she could watch them fall into political chaos from within. She received Baptism surgery that gives her control over the automatons of the Ruins, allowing her to turn La Krushe and Re Plica against the protagonists. It is later revealed that she was the Third Princess of the ancient Holy Arcadia Empire, seeking revenge against the entire world for overthrowing her empire's tyrannical rule. She wields the Divine Drag-Ride "Nidhogg".
La Krushe (ラ・クルシェ, Ra Kurushe)
Voiced by: Maria Naganawa
An artificial humanoid intelligence created by the Ancient Ruins in order to serve them. She starts out benevolent to the protagonists, but is eventually mind-controlled by Hayes, leading the heroes into a trap.

== Media ==
=== Light novels ===
The first light novel volume was published on August 12, 2013, by SB Creative under their GA Bunko imprint. The twentieth and final volume was published on August 6, 2020.

No.	Release date	ISBN
1	August 12, 2013	978-4-7973-7466-7
2	November 15, 2013	978-4-7973-7551-0
3	March 15, 2014	978-4-7973-7613-5
4	July 15, 2014	978-4-7973-7682-1
5	December 15, 2014	978-4-7973-7763-7
6	June 15, 2015	978-4-7973-8320-1
7	October 15, 2015	978-4-7973-8503-8
8	January 15, 2016	978-4-7973-8612-7
9	March 15, 2016	978-4-7973-8621-9
10	July 15, 2016	978-4-7973-8624-0
11	November 15, 2016	978-4-7973-8810-7
12	April 15, 2017	978-4-7973-8811-4
13	September 15, 2017	978-4-7973-9156-5
14	December 15, 2017	978-4-7973-9157-2
15	May 15, 2018	978-4-7973-9701-7
16	September 15, 2018	978-4-7973-9842-7
17	February 15, 2019	978-4-8156-0032-7
18	June 15, 2019	978-4-8156-0249-9
19	November 14, 2019	978-4-8156-0455-4
20	August 6, 2020	978-4-8156-0630-5

=== Manga ===
A manga adaptation was serialized by Square Enix and GA Bunko's online magazine Gangan Online from July 17, 2014, to May 11, 2018. It was released in eleven tankōbon volumes.

No.	Release date	ISBN
1	December 12, 2014	978-4-7575-4494-9
2	June 12, 2015	978-4-7575-4669-1
3	October 14, 2015	978-4-7575-4756-8
4	January 13, 2016	978-4-7575-4825-1
5	March 11, 2016	978-4-7575-4900-5
6	July 13, 2016	978-4-7575-5055-1
7	November 11, 2016	978-4-7575-5149-7
8	April 13, 2017	978-4-7575-5269-2
9	September 13, 2017	978-4-7575-5467-2
10	January 12, 2018	978-4-7575-5581-5
11	May 11, 2018	978-4-7575-5690-4

=== Anime ===
An anime television series adaptation was directed by Masaomi Andō and animated by Lerche. Yuuko Kakihara handled the series composition, while Keiko Kurosawa designed the characters. The series aired from January 11 to March 28, 2016. The opening theme is "Hiryō no Kishi" (飛竜の騎士; lit. 'Wyvern Knight') by True, while the ending theme is "Lime Tree" (ライムツリー) by Nano Ripe. It was streamed on Hulu.

The anime has been licensed by Sentai Filmworks, Madman Entertainment, and MVM Films in the United States, Australia and the United Kingdom, respectively.

== Reception ==
IncendiaryLemon of Anime UK News calls the anime adaptation "generic, lifeless and paint-by-numbers", noting that the characters are either "dull as dishwater" or "totally cookie-cutter", while the potentially interesting "plentiful mecha battles" are undermined by a "paper-thin plot". The critic states that while the technical production features "good quality animation", the narrative attempts at character development are entirely undone by routinely reducing the female cast to a "damsel in distress", concluding that the series is "the very epitome of disposable entertainment" and recommending "not even bothering to watch it to begin with."
