= Junji Majima =

Japanese voice actor (born 1978)

- 間島 淳司
- Born: May 13, 1978 (age 48); Nagoya, Aichi, Japan
- Occupation: Voice actor
- Years active: 1999 — present
- Agent: I'm Enterprise
- Notable credit(s): Toradora! as Ryūji Takasu; Monster Musume as Kimihito Kurusu; Is This a Zombie? as Ayumu Aikawa; Interspecies Reviewers as Stunk; Akame ga Kill! as Run
- Height: 173 cm (5 ft 8 in)
- Website: I'm Enterprise profile

Junji Majima (間島 淳司, Majima Junji; born May 13, 1978) is a Japanese voice actor who is contracted to I'm Enterprise. He was born in Nagoya, Aichi.

== Filmography ==
=== Anime ===
2002

- Midnight Horror School – Borocca
- Princess Tutu – Funeral Attendee (ep 4), Townsperson B (ep 6)

2003

- BASToF Syndrome – Fake
- Scrapped Princess – Forsyth

2004

- Uta∽Kata – Kōji (ep 3)
- Destiny of the Shrine Maiden – Souma Oogami
- Monkey Turn – Takehiro Doguchi
- Monkey Turn V – Takehiro Doguchi
- Rozen Maiden – Yamamoto (ep. 5-10)

==== 2005 ====
- Glass Mask – Gotou (ep 11-14), Grand chamberlain (ep 15)
- Canvas 2: Niji Iro no Sketch – Shouta Hajizume
- Gunparade Orchestra – Hiroshi Ishizuka
- Best Student Council – Friend B (ep 8), Male Student 3 (ep 10), Trainee (ep 9)
- Shakugan no Shana – Male Student A (ep 9)
- Shuffle! – Father (ep 17)
- ToHeart2 – Male Student (ep 3)
- Trinity Blood – Tom (ep 21)
- Fushigiboshi no Futago Hime – Haru
- Honey and Clover – Friend C (ep 1)
- Rozen Maiden: Träumend – Yamamoto, Earl of the Great Egret (ep 10)

2006

- Pumpkin Scissors – Hans
- Disgaea – Prinny, Raminton
- MÄR – Mercury
- Wan Wan Serebu Soreyuke! Tetsunoshin – Hanzo

2007

- Gintama – Legendary Mahjong Player (ep 49)
- Zombie-Loan – Yoshizumi
- Kishin Taisen Gigantic Formula – Yohichi Yoshino
- Shattered Angels – Jin Oogami, DJ (ep 8)
- Goshūshō-sama Ninomiya-kun – Shungo Ninomiya
- Kodomo no Jikan – Daisuke Aoki
- Shugo Chara! – Yū Nikaido
- Sky Girls – Rei Hizuki
- Tactical Roar – Coleman/Coleman II executive officer (eps 5-12)
- Deltora Quest – Manus

2008

- Aria the Origination – Underclassman D (ep 9)
- Golgo 13 – Husband (ep 10)
- Shugo Chara!! Doki – Yū Nikaidō
- Toradora! – Ryūji Takasu
- Nogizaka Haruka no Himitsu – Shute Sutherland, Takashi Ogasawara

2009

- Asura Cryin' – Shuu Mahiwa
- Asura Cryin' 2 – Shuu Mahiwa
- Umi Monogatari ~Anata ga Ite Kureta Koto~ – Sam
- Guin Saga – Simon (ep 14)
- Hell Girl: Three Vessels – Tomohide Matsuda (ep 23)
- Samurai Harem: Asu no Yoichi – Uzumaru Mizunagi (ep 7)
- Sora no Manimani – Takeyasu Roma
- Nogizaka Haruka no Himitsu: Purezza – Shute Sutherland

2010

- Inazuma Eleven – Teres Tolue, Goushu Flare, Winel (ep 109)
- Ore no Imōto ga Konnani Kawaii Wake ga Nai – Kōhei Akagi
- The Legend of the Legendary Heroes – Shuss Shiraz
- A Certain Scientific Railgun – Teacher Daigo (eps 18-20)
- Nura: Rise of the Yokai Clan – Karasu Tengu
- Fairy Tail – Racer
- Mayoi Neko Overrun! – Daigorō Kōya

2011

- Is This a Zombie? – Ayumu Aikawa
- Tamayura - Hitotose – Kazutarō Dōgō
- Nura: Rise of the Yokai Clan: Demon Capital – Karasu Tengu
- Hanasaku Iroha – Tōru Miyagishi
- Aria the Scarlet Ammo – Kinji Tōyama
- Beyblade: Metal Fury – Cycnus

2012

- Cardfight!! Vanguard: Asia Circuit Hen – Crystal
- Kuromajyo-san ga Tōru!! – Matsuoka-sensei
- Is This a Zombie? of the Dead – Ayumu Aikawa
- Say "I love you." – Masashi Tachikawa
- Listen to Me, Girls. I Am Your Father! – Shuntarō Sako
- Btooom! – Hitoshi Kakimoto

2013

- Cardfight!! Vanguard: Link Joker Hen – Vice President Itsuki Suwabe
- Samurai Flamenco – Young Man (ep 6)
- Tamayura - More Aggressive – Kazutarō Dōgō
- A Certain Scientific Railgun S – Haruki Aritomi
- Nagi no Asukara – Itaru Shiodome
- Puchimas! Petit Idolmaster - Producer

2014

- Akame ga KILL! – Run
- One Week Friends – Jun Inoue, Classmate (ep 5)
- Cardfight!! Vanguard: Legion Mate-Hen – Vice Chairman Itsuki Suwabe
- Recently, My Sister Is Unusual – Yūya Kanzaki
- Shirobako – Yuuichirou Shimoyanagi
- Z/X Ignition – Sir Garmatha
- Daitoshokan no Hitsujikai – Kyōtarō Kakei
- DRAMAtical Murder – Virus
- Haikyu!! – Takehito Sasaya (eps 17-18)
- Chaika - The Coffin Princess – Toru Acura
- Chaika - The Coffin Princess Avenging Battle – Toru Acura
- Pokémon XY – Hajime
- Magimoji Rurumo – Senpai
- Love Stage!! – Tenma Hidaka
- Log Horizon 2 – Roreil Dawn

2015

- Aria the Scarlet Ammo AA – Kinji Tōyama
- Assassination Classroom – Ryūnosuke Chiba
- Itoshi no Muco – Ushikō-san
- Overlord – Herohero
- Charlotte – Yoshiyuki Ōmura
- Food Wars: Shokugeki no Soma – Hitoshi Sekimori
- Death Parade – Shigeru Miura
- Gangsta – Emilio Benedetto
- The Kindaichi Case Files – Hikaru Tsukimizato (eps 38-41)
- Battle Spirits Burning Soul – Hanzō Hyakki
- Monster Musume – Kimihito Kurusu
- Comet Lucifer – Alfried Maccaran
- Is It Wrong to Try to Pick Up Girls in a Dungeon? – Takemikazuchi

2016

- Alderamin on the Sky – Matthew Tetdrich
- Assassination Classroom Second Season – Ryūnosuke Chiba
- Drifters – Shara
- The Lost Village – Manbe and Yottsun
- Lostorage incited WIXOSS – Sō Sumida
- Regalia: The Three Sacred Stars – Johnny Muppet
- Tōken Ranbu: Hanamaru – Nikkari Aoe
- Shūmatsu no Izetta – Tobias
- Trickster – Naoki Aragaki

2017

- The Eccentric Family – Junior
- Koro-sensei Q! - Ryūnosuke Chiba
- ACCA: 13-Territory Inspection Dept. – Harrier (ep 10)
- Kirakira PreCure a la Mode – Daisuke Tatsumi
- Rin-ne – Suguru Egawa
- Knight's & Magic – Knut Dixgard (young)
- Sagrada Reset – Seijirō Urachi
- Blood Blockade Battlefront & Beyond – Yurian (Ep. 6)
- Tomica Hyper Rescue Drive Head Kidō Kyūkyū Keisatsu – Hayato Isurugi

2018

- The Ryuo's Work Is Never Done! – Yoshitsune Kuruno
- Record of Grancrest War – Jade
- JoJo's Bizarre Adventure: Golden Wind – Melone / Baby Face
- Sirius the Jaeger – Hideomi Iba
- Chio's School Road – Salaryman
- Ulysses: Jeanne d'Arc and the Alchemist Knight – Alençon

2019

- Grimms Notes The Animation – Robin Hood
- High School Prodigies Have It Easy Even In Another World – Masato Sanada

2020

- Interspecies Reviewers – Stunk
- Auto Boy - Carl from Mobile Land – Polly
- Boruto: Naruto Next Generations – Kankitsu Akitsuki

2021

- Yatogame-chan Kansatsu Nikki 3 Satsume – Masahide Tsuji
- My Hero Academia Season 5 – Koku Hanabata

2022

- Love After World Domination – Daigo Todoroki
- Extreme Hearts – Shinji Ibuki
- Bocchi the Rock! - Naoki Gotō

2023

- Magical Destroyers – Military Otaku
- Dark Gathering – Sakashita

2024

- Sengoku Youko – Void People
- Train to the End of the World – Neko-nii
- Orb: On the Movements of the Earth – Lev

=== Original video animation (OVA) ===
- Kodomo no Jikan Nigakki (xxxx) – Daisuke Aoki
- Kodomo no Jikan: Anata ga Watashi ni Kureta Mono (xxxx) – Daisuke Aoki
- Memories Off (xxxx) – Shin Inaho
- Memories Off 2nd (xxxx) – Shin Inaho
- Memories Off 3.5 - Omoide no Kanata e (xxxx) – Shin Inaho
- Nana to Kaoru (xxxx) – Kaoru Sugimura
- Utawarerumono (xxxx) – Gomuta
- Kagaku na Yatsura (xxxx) – Haruki Komaba
- Thus Spoke Kishibe Rohan (2018) - Gunpei Kamafusa (ep. 2)

=== Theatrical animation ===
- Hanasaku Iroha: The Movie – Home Sweet Home (2013) – Tōru Miyagishi
- Sword Art Online Progressive: Aria of a Starless Night (2021) – Kouichirou Yuuki

=== Drama CDs ===
- Akiyama-kun – Yuuji Akiyama
- Iberiko Buta to Koi to Tsubaki – Tsubaki
- Kannazuki no Miko: Kimi no Mau Butai – Souma Oogami
- NightS - Reply – Seki
- Otaku no Musume-san – Nitta Chihiro (Nicchi-senpai)
- Subete no Koi wa Yamai Kara – Shiina
- Utawareru Mono Original Drama: Tuskuru no Nairan – Kimamaw
- Yandere Kanojo – Tanaka Manabu

=== Video games ===
- Akiba's Trip – Nobu-kun
- Cross Edge – Prinny
- Dengeki Gakuen: Cross of Venus – Ryuuji Takasu
- Disgaea 2 – Prinny and Shura -n
- Disgaea 5: Alliance of Vengeance - Christo and Prinny
- Disgaea: Hour of Darkness – Prinny and Seraph Lammington
- Disgaea D2: A Brighter Darkness - Seraph Lammington
- Dragon Ball Xenoverse – Time Patroller (Male 7)
- Eve: Ghost Enemies – Julio Furio
- Fire Emblem: Path of Radiance, Fire Emblem: Radiant Dawn and Super Smash Bros. Ultimate – Black Knight
- Fire Emblem: Radiant Dawn – Zelgius
- Fire Emblem Heroes – Black Knight, Eldigan, Jeorge, Karel, Oscar, Sothe and Zelgius
- Genji: Dawn of the Samurai – Saburouta
- GetAmped2 – Mike Davis
- Gokuraku Parodius – Pentarou and Nohusuky
- Granado Espada – Gavin
- Grand Chase: Dimensional Chaser - Ercknard Sieghart
- Ikemen Royal Palace: Cinderella in Midnight – Giles Christophe
- Inazuma Eleven 3 Sekai e no Chousen – Teres Torue
- Memories Off series — Shin Inaho (He has also voiced several other characters that appeared in the same series, not only Shin)
- Phantom Brave – Raphael
- Samurai Spirits Tenkaichi Kenkyakuden – Galford D. Weller, Sogetsu Kazama, and Shiro Tokisada Amakusa
- Tears to Tiara II: Heir of the Overlord – Dion
- Tori no Hoshi: Aerial Planet – Prinny
- JoJo's Bizarre Adventure: All Star Battle R – Melone
- Touken Ranbu – Nikkari Aoe
- Trinity Universe – Prinny
- Honkai: Star Rail – Dan Feng

=== Tokusatsu ===
- Kamen Rider × Kamen Rider Wizard & Fourze: Movie War Ultimatum (xxxx) – Other Kamen Riders (Voice of Atsushi Tamaru and Hideki Tasaka)

=== Adult visual novels ===
Under Kiya Suga (須賀 紀哉, Suga Kiya) name.

- AliveZ – Mukuro Kanza
- eden* PLUS+MOSAIC – Ryō Haruna
- Secret Game CODE: Revise – Shuhei Fujita
- Sugar Coat Freaks – Gino Gransyrto Ruritania
- Pastel Chime Continue – Huge Baret
  - Pascha C++ – Huge Baret
- Full Ani – Yū Morozumi
- DRAMAtical Murder – Virus

=== Dubbing ===
- August – Joshua Sterling (Adam Scott)
- The Conclave – Rodrigo Borgia
- Hot Wheels AcceleRacers – Kurt Wylde
- Hot Wheels World Race – Kurt Wylde
- Kamen Rider: Dragon Knight – Brandon
- Teen Knight – Ben
- Wolf Creek – Ben Mitchell

== Other appearances ==
=== Radio ===
- Radio Kannazuki (RADIO神無月)
- Radio Kyōshirō (RADIO京四郎) (August 30, 2006 — present)
- ToradoRadio! (とらドラジオ!)
