= Ayumi Tsunematsu =

Japanese voice actress

- Born: Hyōgo, Japan
- Occupation: Voice actress
- Agent: 81 Produce

Ayumi Tsunematsu (恒松 あゆみ, Tsunematsu Ayumi) is a Japanese voice actress.

== Filmography ==
=== Anime series ===
- Aikatsu! as Lisa Hīragi/Green Grass
- Avenger as Mist, Peter (ep 2)
- Bakugan Battle Brawlers as Harpy, Miyoko Kūsō
- Bakugan: Gundalian Invaders as Miyoko Kuso
- Bakugan Battle Brawlers: New Vestroia as Miyoko Kuso
- BanG Dream! 3rd Season as Miu Tamade
- Bleach: Thousand-Year Blood War as Kirio Hikifune
- Bokurano as Chizu's mother (ep 7)
- Digimon Universe: Appli Monsters as Beautymon
- Delicious Party Pretty Cure as Akiho Nagomi (ep 39 onwards)
- Emma: A Victorian Romance as House maid (ep 11)
- Fate/Zero as Maiya Hisau
- Gakuen Heaven as Kazuki Endo (child)
- Gargantia on the Verdurous Planet as Lukkage
- Gintama as Female Clerk (Ep. 23), Juttoku's Daughter (Ep. 21), Mama (ep 11–12), Matsu (Ep. 38 flashback)
- Glass Mask as Keiko Ninomiya
- Grandpa Danger as Sonny
- Great Pretender as Miki Edamura
- Gunparade Orchestra as Miki Kinjou
- Hayate the Combat Butler as Female student (ep 29)
- Hell Girl as Employee (ep 5)
- Hitohira as Sachie Ayase
- Honey and Clover II as Daughter (ep 12)
- Innocent Venus as Akira (Ep. 8)
- Hanasaku Iroha as Takako Kawajiri
- Jigoku Shōjo Futakomori as Mami Kuriyama (ep 8)
- Jormungand as Mildo
- Karin as Female Student C (ep 7)
- Kirakira Pretty Cure a la Mode as Solène
- Kirarin Revolution as Tina Garland (ep 32)
- Kyo Kara Maoh! as Young Conrad, Young Stoffel
- La Corda D'Oro ~primo passo~ as Young Tsuchiura (ep. 4)
- Major as Hasegawa
- Rockman.EXE Axess as Kousuke
- Mobile Suit Gundam 00 as Marina Ismail
- Mobile Suit Gundam AGE as Marina Asuno, Romy Ezelcant
- Naruto as Hokuto
- Nishi no Yoki Majo - Astraea Testament as Vincent Clemencia Daquitaine
- Onegai My Melody as Mr. Crab (ep 1)
- Overtake! as Saeko Yukihira
- Pumpkin Scissors as Mother (ep 6)
- Re:Creators as Aki Kikuchihara
- Scenes from Awajima as Katsurako Ibuki
- SD Gundam Sangokuden Brave Battle Warriors as Chou-sen Qubeley
- Sengoku Collection as Date Masamune (ep 4, 15, 22)
- Sirius the Jaeger as Sachi
- Tona-Gura! as Niina's mother (ep 4)
- Tsubasa: RESERVoir CHRoNiCLE as Secret Agents (ep 9)
- Utawarerumono as Younger sister (ep 14)
- Wangan Midnight as Yoko Ota (ep 21)
- Wizard Barristers: Benmashi Cecil as Ageha Chōno
- Zoids: Fuzors as Matt; Chao

=== Original video animation ===
- Mobile Suit Gundam: The Origin (Astraia Tor Deikun)
- Yu-Gi-Oh! Trading Card Game (Diabel)

=== Anime films ===
- Mobile Suit Gundam 00 the Movie: A Wakening of the Trailblazer (Marina Ismail)

=== Video games ===
- Arknights (Ines)
- Astral Chain (Alicia Lopez)
- Azure Striker Gunvolt 2 (Nori)
- Bleach: Brave Souls (Kirio Hikifune)
- Bravely Second (Magnolia Arch)
- CR Virtua Fighter (Sarah Bryant, Vanessa Lewis)
- League of Legends (Kayle)
- Super Robot Wars UX (Chousen Qubeley)
- Path to Nowhere (Du Ruo)

=== Live-action ===
- Death Note (Rem)
- Yell (Actress)

=== Tokusatsu ===
- Uchu Sentai Kyuranger as Echidna (Actor by Taiki Yamazaki) (ep 28, 31)

=== Dubbing ===
==== Live-action ====
- The Age of Adaline (Adaline (Blake Lively))
- Ant-Man and the Wasp (Catherine (Riann Steele))
- The Best Years of Our Lives (Peggy Stephenson (Teresa Wright))
- Barbie (Judge Barbie (Ana Cruz Kayne))
- Belfast (Ma (Caitríona Balfe))
- Blade Runner 2049 (Dr. Ana Steline (Carla Juri))
- Chicken with Plums (Irâne (Golshifteh Farahani))
- The Connection (Jacqueline Michel (Céline Sallette))
- The Correspondence (Victoria (Shauna Macdonald))
- Cosmopolis (Elise Packer (Sarah Gadon))
- Criminal (Jillian Pope (Gal Gadot))
- Cruella (Catherine Miller (Emily Beecham))
- The Cursed: Dead Man's Prey (Im Jin-hee (Uhm Ji-won))
- Don't Worry Darling (Shelley (Gemma Chan))
- Eternals (Sersi (Gemma Chan))
- Far from the Madding Crowd (Bathsheba Everdene (Carey Mulligan))
- Ford v Ferrari (Mollie Miles (Caitriona Balfe))
- Hostage (Amanda Talley (Rumer Willis))
- In Bruges (Chloe Villette (Clémence Poésy))
- Inception (2012 TV Asahi edition) (Woman (Talulah Riley))
- Ip Man series until The Finale (Cheung Wing-sing (Lynn Hung))
- Knock Knock (Bel (Ana de Armas))
- Kristy (Justine Wills (Haley Bennett))
- Law Abiding Citizen (Sarah Lowell (Leslie Bibb))
- Mindscape (Judith Morrow (Indira Varma))
- Money Monster (Diane Lester (Caitriona Balfe))
- My Fake Fiancé (Courtney (Nicole Tubiola))
- The Nutcracker and the Four Realms (Queen Marie Stahlbaum (Anna Madeley))
- Outlander (Claire Beauchamp Randall/Fraser (Caitriona Balfe))
- Parasite (2021 NTV edition) (Choi Yeon-gyo (Cho Yeo-jeong))
- Rabbit Hole (Izzy (Tammy Blanchard))
- Saint Ralph (Claire Collins (Tamara Hope))
- Scandal (Abby Whelan (Darby Stanchfield))
- Side Effects (Deirdre Banks (Vinessa Shaw))
- Skiptrace (Samantha Bai (Fan Bingbing))
- The Texas Chainsaw Massacre 2 (Vanita "Stretch" Brock (Caroline Williams))
- Tomorrowland (History Teacher (Xantha Radley))
- Ultraman: Rising (Mina (Tamlyn Tomita))
- Wild Things: Foursome (Rachel Thomas (Marnette Patterson))
- The Witches (Mrs. Jenkins (Morgana Robinson))

==== Animation ====
- Batman: The Brave and the Bold (Talia al Ghul)
- Coco (Mamá Luisa Rivera)
- Rio (Jewel)
- Rio 2 (Jewel)
- Teen Titans (Kole)
- Wish (Sakina)
