= Chiaki Omigawa =

Japanese voice actress (born 1989)

- 小見川 千明
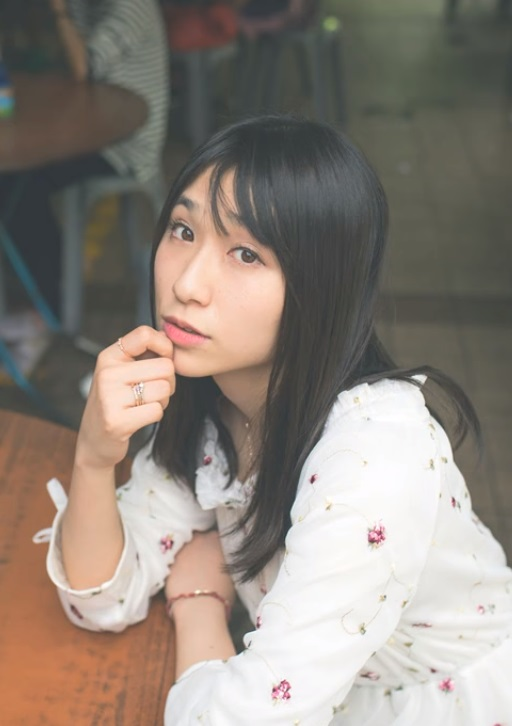
- Omigawa in 2017.
- Born: November 11, 1989 (age 36); Kanagawa Prefecture, Japan
- Occupations: Actress; voice actress
- Years active: 1993–present
- Agent: Freelance
- Height: 158 cm (5 ft 2 in)
- Website: chiaki-omigawa.amebaownd.com

Chiaki Omigawa (小見川 千明, Omigawa Chiaki; born November 11, 1989) is a Japanese actress.

== Career ==
She entered a theatrical company at the age of 4 and started stage activities. After leaving the group at the age of 10, she continued auditioning after receiving her own audition. From 2006, she belonged to the Hirata agency. She debuted as a voice actress as the lead character Maka Albarn in Soul Eater. On December 31, 2016, she announced that she would leave her agency and go freelance. She has belonged to Crocodile since August 16, 2017.

From March 1, 2025, she will become independent from Crocodile and become a freelancer.

== Filmography ==
=== Anime ===
List of voice performances in anime
Year	Title	Role	Notes	Source
2008	Soul Eater	Maka Albarn		
2009	Natsu no Arashi!	Jun Kamigamo	Also Akinai-chū	
2010–13	Hidamari Sketch series	Nazuna	Starting with Hoshimittsu	
2010	Arakawa Under the Bridge	P-ko	Also Bridge x Bridge	
2010–present	Seitokai Yakuindomo series	Mutsumi Mitsuba	Also OVAs and * series	
2010	Squid Girl	Junior C	10 episodes	
2010	And Yet the Town Moves	Hotori Arashiyama		
2011	Hanasaku Iroha	Minko Tsurugi		
2011	Maria Holic Alive	Komachi Yamaki		
2011	Double-J	Maria Sassa		
2011	Last Exile: Fam, the Silver Wing	Magnolia		
2012	Bodacious Space Pirates	Mami Endo, Flora Chapie		
2012	Eureka Seven AO	Elena Peoples		
2014	Saki: The Nationals	Megan Davin		
2014	Soul Eater Not!	Maka Albarn		
2014	Girl Friend Beta	Isuki Ishida		
2015	World Break: Aria of Curse for a Holy Swordsman	Angela Johnson		
2015	The Disappearance of Nagato Yuki-chan	Mori Sonou		
2015	God Eater Resurrection	Licca Kusunoki		
2016	Haruchika	Kae Asahina		
2016	Luck & Logic	Valkyrie		
2016	Bungo Stray Dogs	Naomi Tanizaki		
2016	Mob Psycho 100	Mukai		
2017	Kemono Friends	Panther Chameleon	Ep. 6	
2018	Chio's School Road	Manana Nonomura		
2018–present	Dropkick on My Devil!	Minos		
2021–present	Bungo Stray Dogs Wan!	Naomi Tanizaki		
2021–present	Seirei Gensouki: Spirit Chronicles	Ruri		
2022	Kotaro Lives Alone	Housewife	Ep. 7	
2025	The Beginning After the End	Jasmine Flamesworth		

=== Film ===
List of voice performances in film
Year	Title	Role	Notes	Source
2011	Towa no Quon	Miu	film series	
2011	Mahou Sensei Negima! Anime Final	Sakurako Shiina		
2013	Hanasaku Iroha: The Movie – Home Sweet Home	Minko Tsurugi		
2014	Bodacious Space Pirates: Abyss of Hyperspace	Mami Endo		

=== Video games ===
List of voice performances in video games
Year	Title	Role	Notes	Source
	Soul Eater games	Maka Albarn		
2012	Zero Escape: Virtue's Last Reward	Phi	DS	
2013	Super fast transformation gyro zetter wing of alvarros ja:超速変形ジャイロゼッター アルバロスの翼	Sena	DS	
2015	Hatsumira ja:果つることなき未来ヨリ	Katsuko Makino		
2016	Zero Escape: Zero Time Dilemma	Phi	3DS, other	
2016	Girls' Frontline	C-93, Gr HK33	Mobile Games	
2016	Reco Love レコラブ	Kokomi Isuzu	Blue Ocean and Gold Beach versions	
2017	Fate/Grand Order	Paul Bunyan		
2021	DC Super Hero Girls: Teen Power	Harley Quinn / Harleen Quinzel		
2025	Trickcal: Chibi Go	Alice	iOS, Android	

=== Drama CD ===
List of voice performances in audio recordings
Year	Title	Role	Notes	Source
2012	Comical Psychosomatic Medicine	Himeru Kangoshi	Drama CD	

=== Dubbing ===
List of dubbing performances
Title	Role	Voice dub for	Notes	Source
Bad Times at the El Royale	Rose Summerspring	Cailee Spaeny		
The Bold Type	Mara Chamberlain	Myra Molloy		
Color Out of Space	Lavinia Gardner	Madeleine Arthur		
F Is for Family	Anthony			
Titans	Rachel Roth / Raven	Teagan Croft		
