= Chio's School Road =

Japanese manga series

- First tankōbon volume cover, featuring Chio Miyamo

ちおちゃんの通学路 (Chio-chan no Tsūgakuro)
- Genre: Comedy
- Manga
- Written by: Tadataka Kawasaki
- Published by: Media Factory
- English publisher: NA: Yen Press
- Magazine: Monthly Comic Flapper
- Original run: April 5, 2014 – September 5, 2018
- Volumes: 9
- Anime television series
- Directed by: Takayuki Inagaki
- Produced by: Junichirō Tamura; Takashi Tachizaki
- Written by: Takayuki Inagaki
- Music by: Tomotaka Ohsumi
- Studio: Diomedéa
- Licensed by: Crunchyroll (Note: In North America through Crunchyroll, LLC (formerly known as Funimation).)
- Original network: Tokyo MX, GBS, Mie TV, Sun TV, KBS, BS11
- Original run: July 6, 2018 – September 21, 2018
- Episodes: 12

Chio's School Road (Japanese: ちおちゃんの通学路, Hepburn: Chio-chan no Tsūgakuro; lit. "Chio's Commute to School") is a Japanese manga series written and illustrated by Tadataka Kawasaki. It was serialized in Media Factory's Monthly Comic Flapper magazine from April 2014 to September 2018. A 12-episode anime television series adaptation by Diomedéa aired from July to September 2018.

== Plot ==
The story features a simple premise—high school girl Chio Miyamo walking from her house to her school. What happens between these two points, however, varies from day to day, ranging from strange conversations with her friend Manana Nonomura, dealing with biker gangs, and performing death-defying feats of parkour.

== Characters ==
Chio Miyamo (三谷裳 ちお, Miyamo Chio)
Voiced by: Naomi Ōzora (Japanese); Mikaela Krantz (English)
Chio is a high school girl who experiences all sorts of craziness on her commute to school. She is an avid gamer, particularly of Western video games, and occasionally tries to put her game experience into practice with varying degrees of success.
Manana Nonomura (野々村 真奈菜, Nonomura Manana)
Voiced by: Chiaki Omigawa (Japanese); Emily Fajardo (English)
Manana is Chio's best friend who has been with her since elementary school. Despite their close friendship, the two will occasionally try to backstab each other.
Yuki Hosokawa (細川 雪, Hosokawa Yuki)
Voiced by: Kaede Hondo (Japanese); Kristin Sutton (English)
Yuki is Chio's classmate who is a sports ace, she is very polite and often oblivious to how people see her.
Momo Shinozuka (篠塚 桃, Shinozuka Momo)
Voiced by: Minori Suzuki (Japanese); Kristi Rothrock (English)
Momo is a member of the public morals committee at Chio's school who has a crush on her teacher, Gotou.
Madoka Kushitori (久志取 まどか, Kushitori Madoka)
Voiced by: Yō Taichi (Japanese); Marissa Lenti (English)
Madoka is a senior student at Chio's school who is captain of the Kabaddi Club. She has a strong passion for kabaddi, which she ultimately comes to realize is not based in the sport itself, but rather for it being the perfect excuse to grope other girls.
Gotou (後藤, Gotō)
Voiced by: Hiroki Takahashi (Japanese); Robert McCollum (English)
Gotou is a teacher at Chio's school who always waits at the school gates as students come in every morning. While stern, he deeply cares for his students and greatly enjoys his job.
Mayuta Andou (安藤 繭太, Andō Mayuta)
Voiced by: Rikiya Koyama (Japanese); Marcus D. Stimac (English)
Mayuta is a former biker gang leader who is tricked by Chio into quitting his gang and now seeks to earn an honest living as a convenience store clerk. He has a crush on Chio and often goes to absurd lengths to impress her.
Chiharu Andou (安藤 ちはる, Andō Chiharu)
Voiced by: Saya Aizawa (Japanese); Alison Viktorin (English)
Chiharu is Mayuta's younger sister who has a bad habit of trying to poke other people's bottoms. She loves her older brother dearly and is driven to find the woman who made him quit his gang.

== Media ==
=== Manga ===
Chio's School Road, written and illustrated by Tadataka Kawasaki, was serialized in Media Factory's Monthly Comic Flapper magazine from April 5, 2014, to September 5, 2018. Nine tankōbon volumes were published from September 23, 2014, to September 21, 2018. The series is licensed in North America by Yen Press.

No.	Original release date	Original ISBN	English release date	English ISBN
1	September 23, 2014	978-4-04-066857-4	August 21, 2018	978-1-9753-8120-2
2	March 23, 2015	978-4-04-067297-7	November 13, 2018	978-1-9753-0298-6
3	September 19, 2015	978-4-04-067811-5	March 19, 2019	978-1-9753-0301-3
4	March 23, 2016	978-4-04-068227-3	May 21, 2019	978-1-9753-2767-5
5	September 23, 2016	978-4-04-068538-0	September 10, 2019	978-1-9753-2770-5
6	March 23, 2017	978-4-04-069115-2	November 12, 2019	978-1-9753-2773-6
7	September 23, 2017	978-4-04-069415-3	January 7, 2020	978-1-9753-2776-7
8	March 23, 2018	978-4-04-069773-4	April 21, 2020	978-1-9753-5669-9
9	September 21, 2018	978-4-04-065107-1	June 23, 2020	978-1-9753-5745-0

=== Anime ===
A 12-episode anime television series adaptation was originally scheduled to premiere in April 2018, but the release date was pushed back to July 6, and it concluded on September 21 of the same year. It was directed and written by Takayuki Inagaki at Diomedéa, with character designs by Mayuko Matsumoto. Crunchyroll streamed the series with English subtitles, while Funimation produced a SimulDub. The opening theme is "Danger in my Tsūgakuro" (Danger in my 通学路) by Naomi Ōzora, Chiaki Omigawa, and Kaede Hondo, while the ending theme is "Nanairoad" (ナナイロード) by Ōzora and Omigawa.

No.	Title (Note: All English titles are taken from Crunchyroll.)	Original release date
1	"Because the School Is There"; Transliteration: "Soko ni Gakkō ga Aru Kara" (Japanese: そこに学校があるから)	July 6, 2018
1	"Chio-chan and Hosokawa-san"; Transliteration: "Chio-chan to Hosokawa-san" (Japanese: ちおちゃんと細川さん)	July 6, 2018
Running late to school and finding her usual shortcut blocked off, Chio Miyamo decides to take a cue from her video games and attempts to parkour her way to school via rooftop. On another day, Chio is unsure how to react when sports ace Yuki Hosokawa greets her during her commute.
2	"Bloody Butterfly Effect"; Transliteration: "Buraddi Batafurai Efekuto" (Japanese: ブラッディ・バタフライ・エフェクト)	July 13, 2018
2	"Manana, Ootoro, and Me"; Transliteration: "Manana to Ōtoro to Watashi" (Japanese: 真奈菜と大トロと私)	July 13, 2018
2	"Bump of Slave"; Transliteration: "Banpu obu Sureibu" (Japanese: バンプ・オブ・スレイブ)	July 13, 2018
After accidentally elbowing motorcycle gang leader Mayuta Andou and knocking over his bicycle, Chio escapes the situation by taking on her online persona, Bloody Butterfly, and scaring him into quitting his gang. The next day, Chio and her friend Manana Nonomura spy on Yuki being confessed to by a boy, ending up in a compromising situation themselves when she mentions being friends with Chio. Later, Manana lies about having experience with guys to try and get in good graces with Yuki.
3	"Bloody Butterfly Effect 2"; Transliteration: "Buraddi Batafurai Efekuto 2" (Japanese: ブラッディ・バタフライ・エフェクト 2)	July 20, 2018
3	"The Kabaddic Four"; Transliteration: "Kabadikku Fō" (Japanese: カバディック・フョー)	July 20, 2018
Chio comes across Andou speaking with his gang about their encounter, prompting her to reveal the truth to him about Bloody Butterfly. The next day, Chio and Manana are approached by Madoka Kushitori about joining her Kabaddi Club. Forced into a practice match against her and Yuki, Chio manages to avoid defeat by taking advantage of Madoka's lesbian tendencies.
4	"Smoke on the Sailor"; Transliteration: "Sumōku on za Sērā" (Japanese: スモーク・オン・ザ・セーラー)	July 27, 2018
4	"Taking the Cherry Blossom in Your Hand"; Transliteration: "Sakura no Hana o Te ni Totte" (Japanese: 桜の花を手にとって)	July 27, 2018
4	"Manana's School Road"; Transliteration: "Manana-chan no Tsūgakuro" (Japanese: まななちゃんの通学路)	July 27, 2018
Chio and Manana find themselves with a used cigarette and have fun playing with it in a barely legal sense, but are soon faced with the task of getting it past their teacher Gotou. Later, the girls help out Andou as he struggles to deal with troublesome customers during a newspaper delivery job. On another day, Manana demonstrates how she would have handled Chio's first encounter with Yuki.
5	"Thank You, George"; Transliteration: "Sankyū, Jōji" (Japanese: サンキュー, ジョージ)	August 3, 2018
5	"Mananacchio"; Transliteration: "Mananacchio" (Japanese: まななっちお)	August 3, 2018
Desperately needing to go to the toilet, Chio inadvertently walks into a men's bathroom and has to find a way to sneak out unnoticed. Momo Shinozuka, a public morals officer with a crush on Gotou, finds herself bewildered by the weird antics of Chio and Manana, questioning if they are actually friends.
6	"Everyone's Own Path"; Transliteration: "Sorezore no Michi" (Japanese: それぞれの道)	August 10, 2018
6	"Chio-chan Eludes"; Transliteration: "Erūdo Chio-chan" (Japanese: エルードちおちゃん)	August 10, 2018
Chio and Manana spot Madoka training to suppress her desire to touch other girls for the sake of true kabaddi. On another day, Chio, influenced by stealth games, tries to sneak up on Manana by hanging off the side of a bridge, only to find pulling herself up harder than she thought.
7	"Convenience Store Chio-chan"; Transliteration: "Konbini Chio-chan" (Japanese: コンビニちおちゃん)	August 17, 2018
7	"Chio-chan and the Duel"; Transliteration: "Chio-chan to Kettō" (Japanese: ちおちゃんと決闘)	August 17, 2018
7	"Remnants of That Day"; Transliteration: "Ano Hi no Omokage" (Japanese: あの日の面影)	August 17, 2018
Chio attempts to buy a BL game magazine from the convenience store, only to discover that Andou is working there. The next day, Chio is challenged to a butt-poking duel by a girl seeking revenge for her brother. Later, Chio and Manana come across an old woman, who they assume is reminiscing over a lost love.
8	"Yuki-chan Doesn't Care"; Transliteration: "Yuki-chan wa Ki ni Shinai" (Japanese: 雪ちゃんは気にしない)	August 24, 2018
8	"Chio Fisher"; Transliteration: "Chio Fisshā" (Japanese: チオ・フィッシャー)	August 24, 2018
8	"Momo-chan's Story"; Transliteration: "Momo-chan no Ohanashi" (Japanese: 桃ちゃんのおはなし)	August 24, 2018
When Yuki decides to wear her skimpy track uniform to school, Manana decides to test her to see if she will be embarrassed. Chio's gaming sense gets the better of her yet again when she decides to climb up a narrow alleyway, prompting Manana to go and save her. Momo recalls how, in her time of need, she was saved by Gotou and joined the disciplinary committee.
9	"Chio-chan Changes Her Image"; Transliteration: "Imechen Chio-chan" (Japanese: イメチェンちおちゃん)	August 31, 2018
9	"Flat Cut"; Transliteration: "Furatto Katto" (Japanese: フラットカット)	August 31, 2018
A homeless man who previously helped Madoka with her training decides to help Chio change up her image. Later, Manana notices that Andou has a crush on Chio and is desperately trying to appeal to her.
10	"Shinozuka-san, Sugar Content, and the Press Conference"; Transliteration: "Shinozuka-san to Tōbun to Kisha Kaiken" (Japanese: 篠塚さんと糖分と記者会見)	September 7, 2018
10	"Thousand Spring"; Transliteration: "Sauzando Supuringu" (Japanese: サウザンドスプリング)	September 7, 2018
10	"Andou and George"; Transliteration: "Andō to Jōji" (Japanese: 安藤とジョージ)	September 7, 2018
Wanting to break the rules to better understand Gotou, Momo asks Chio and Manana to help her experience what it is like to buy sweets on the way to school, exposing how she acts when she eats sweet things. Chio once again encounters the butt-poking girl, revealed to be Andou's younger sister Chiharu, who is seeking revenge against the woman who caused her brother to quit his gang. Afterward, Andou tries to protect George the cat from danger.
11	"Chio in the Middle of the Night"; Transliteration: "Mayonaka no Chio-chan" (Japanese: 真夜中のちおちゃん)	September 14, 2018
11	"Apocri!"; Transliteration: "Apokuri!" (Japanese: アポクリ!)	September 14, 2018
Chio finds herself unable to get to sleep after a late night gaming session, putting herself in a tough situation when she inadvertently wakes up at 4am. Manana becomes conscious about her body odor, only to discover Chio smells way worse than her, wondering if it was the cause of all of her misfortunes.
12	"Just One Masterful Method"; Transliteration: "Tatta Hitotsu no Saeta Yarikata" (Japanese: たったひとつの冴えたやりかた)	September 21, 2018
12	"Yuki-chan Bares It All"; Transliteration: "Yuki-chan wa Matowanai" (Japanese: 雪ちゃんはまとわない)	September 21, 2018
Chiharu asks for Chio's help with her social studies homework on how she could earn 500 yen, leading them to search for cans to sell at the recycling plant. Later, a revelation about what Yuki does at home somehow leads to everyone walking to school without panties on, which proves exhilarating until they run into Madoka.
