= Nakai (vocation) =

Waitress at a ryokan or Japanese inn

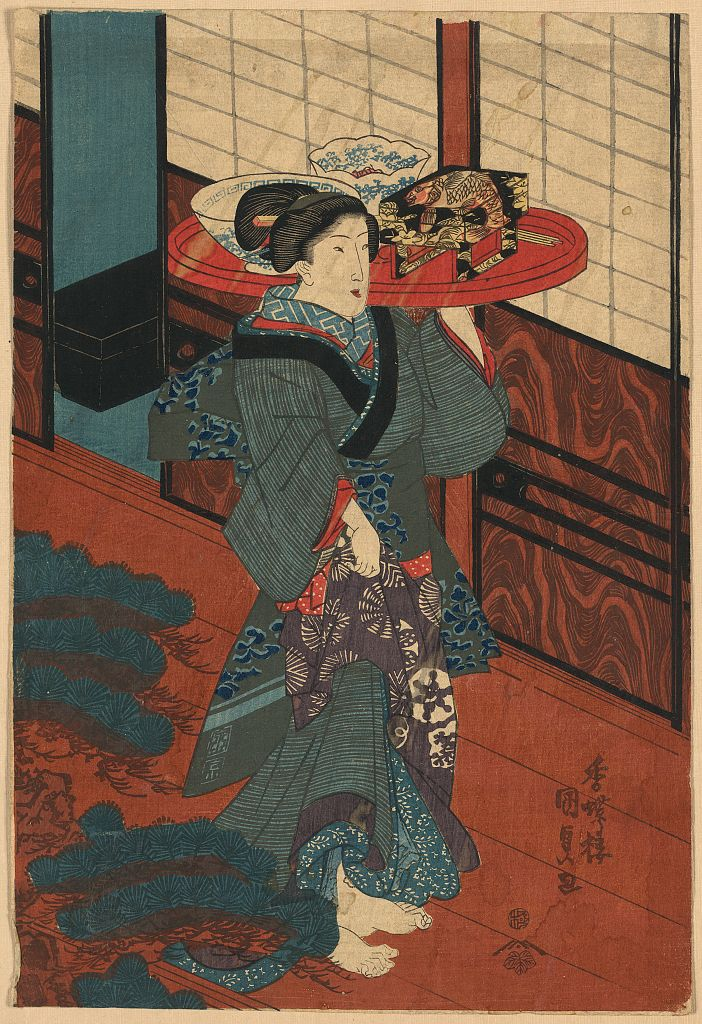
Ryōri o hakobu nakai, an 1830 print by Utagawa Kunisada II

A nakai (仲居) is a woman who serves as a waitress at a ryokan or Japanese inn.

Originally written as nakai (中居) (meaning "in the house" in Japanese), which meant the anteroom in a mansion of a kuge (noble man) or gomonzeki (the princess of Mikado). Nowadays it refers to work in a butler's pantry, homemaking sector, or the managing division and its office staff. At Kyuchu (the Imperial Court), such women were also named osue.

In ancient times, nakai meant a lady's maid ranking between kami-jochu (maid of honor) and gejo (the lowest rank of maid). Now it means women who serve visitors in restaurants or inns. They are usually residential staff and work long hours.

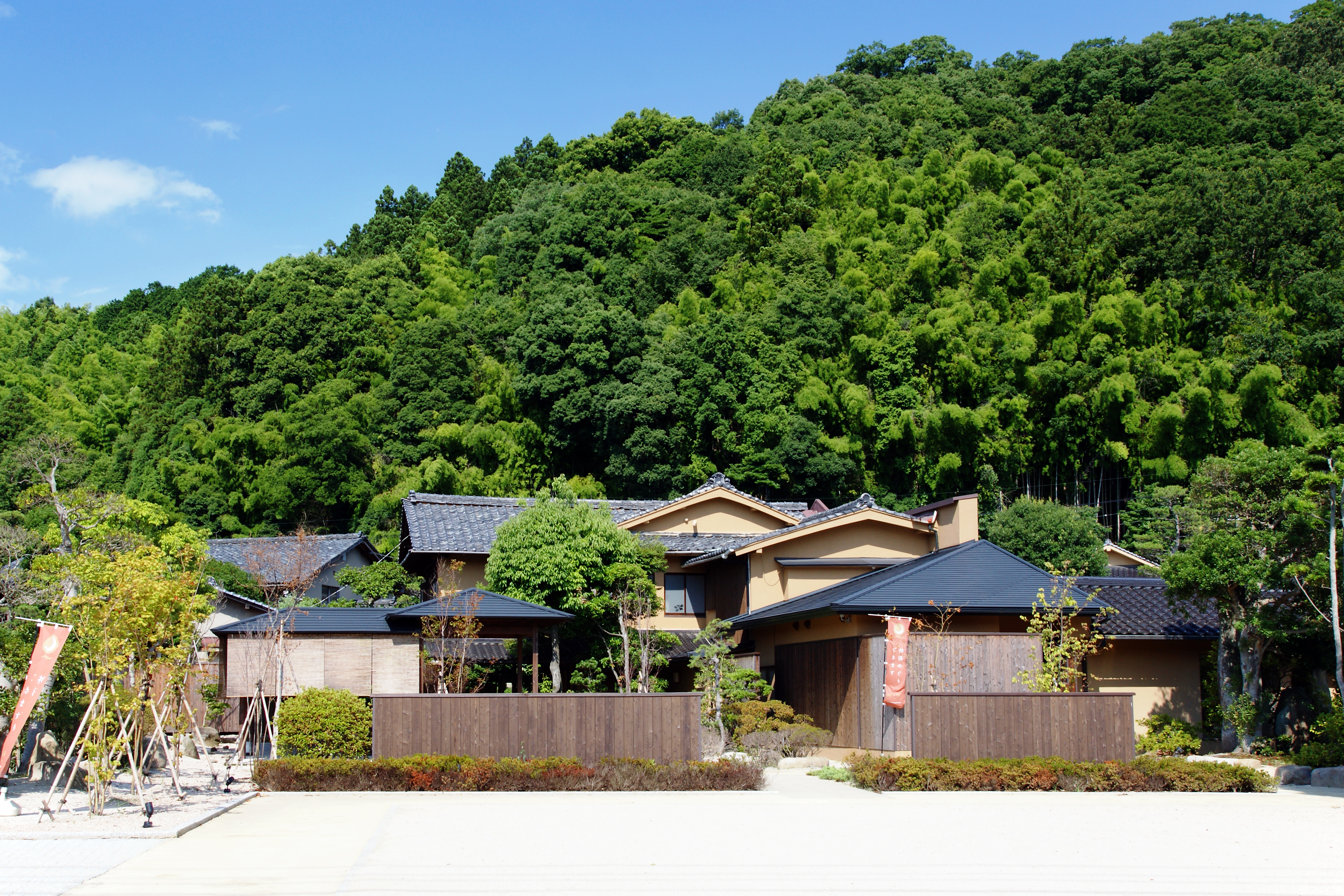
A typical ryokan

== See also ==
- Meshimori onna
