= Kanae Itō =

Japanese voice actress and singer (born 1986)

- 伊藤 かな恵
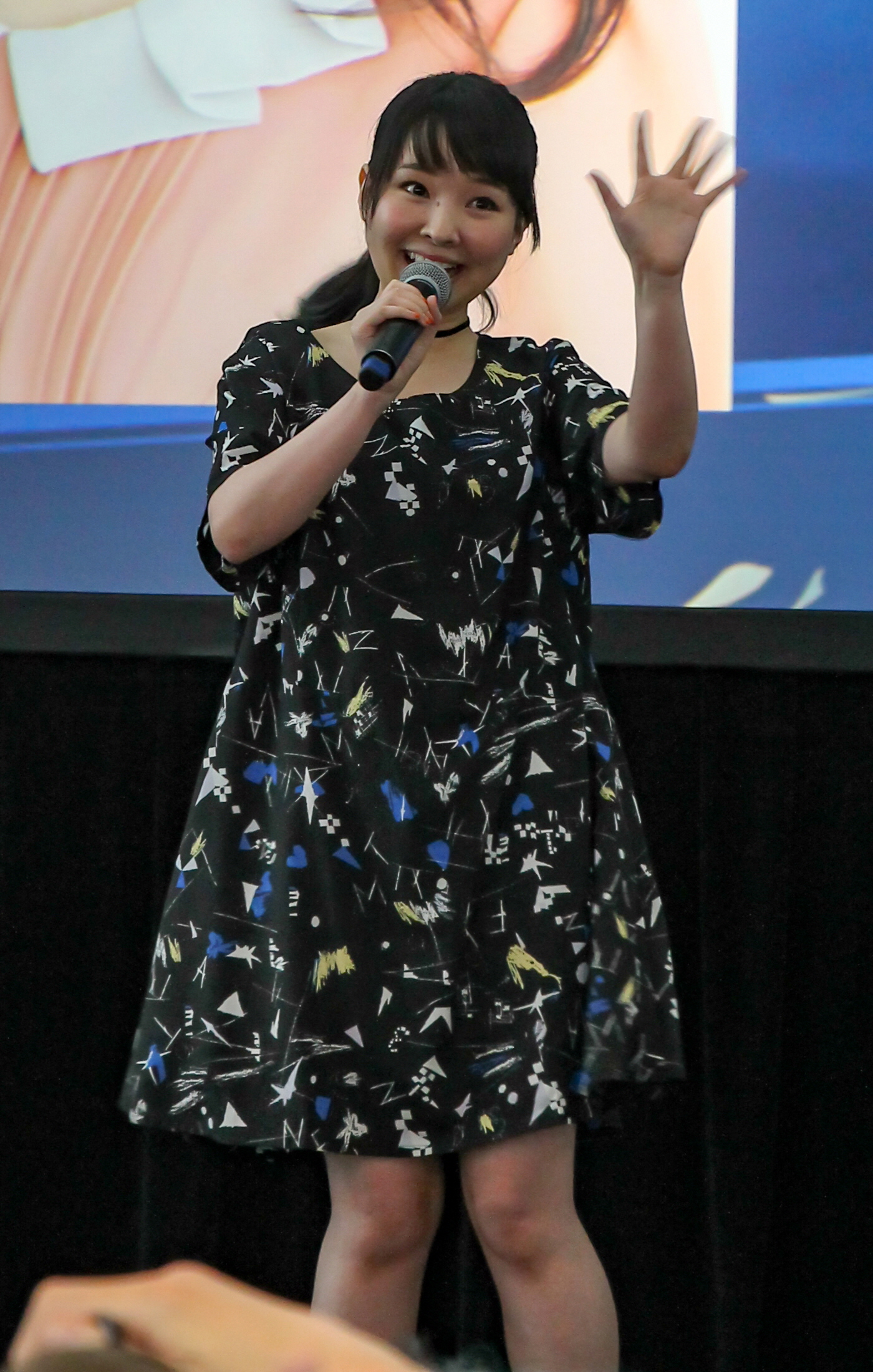
- Itō at FanimeCon 2017
- Born: November 26, 1986 (age 39); Nagano Prefecture, Japan
- Occupations: Voice actress; singer
- Years active: 2006–present
- Agent: Aoni Production

Kanae Itō (伊藤 かな恵, Itō Kanae) (born November 26, 1986) is a Japanese voice actress and singer from Nagano Prefecture.

== Biography ==
After graduating from high school, Ito attended the Amusement Media Academy in 2007. She was a member of the groups Koetchi (こえっち) and Rirachitchi (りらちっち), before they were disbanded between December 16, 2005, and January 28, 2007. She played Meganee Akai in Pretty Series. Her role was praised by critics, and later appeared in radio serials, drama CDs and video games. Itō played Fumino Serizawa in Mayoi Neko Overrun! and Airi in Queen's Blade. She and Aki Toyosaki starred on several series, including Shugo Chara!, To Love-Ru, The World God Only Knows, Hanasaku Iroha and A Certain Scientific Railgun (they also hosted the A Certain Scientific Railgun web radio show, Radio no Railgun). Itō won the awards at the 4th Seiyu Awards and the 5th Seiyu Awards.

== Filmography ==
=== Anime series ===
2007

- Hatara Kizzu Maihamu Gumi – Kumi
- Shugo Chara! – Amu Hinamori, Diamond

2008

- Birdy the Mighty: Decode – Natsumi Hayamiya
- Shugo Chara!! Doki— – Amu Hinamori, Diamond

2009

- Birdy the Mighty Decode: 02 – Natsumi Hayamiya
- Kiddy Girl-and – Belle
- One Piece – Boa Hancock (child)
- Queen's Blade: The Exiled Virgin – Airi
- Queen's Blade 2: The Evil Eye – Airi
- Shugo Chara!! Party! – Amu Hinamori, Diamond
- Sora no Manimani – Mihoshi Akeno
- Taishō Baseball Girls – Koume Suzukawa
- A Certain Scientific Railgun – Ruiko Saten
- To Love Ru – Nana Astar Deviluke

2010

- Mayoi Neko Overrun! – Fumino Serizawa, Sayaka
- Kyō, Koi o Hajimemasu (OVA) – Tsubaki Hibino
- Okami-san and Her Seven Companions – Ringo Akai
- Cat Planet Cuties – Eris
- Motto To Love Ru – Nana Astar Deviluke
- Squid Girl – Sanae Nagatsuki
- The World God Only Knows – Elsie de Lute Ima

2011

- Haganai – Sena Kashiwazaki
- Code:Breaker – Nyanmaru
- Hanasaku Iroha – Ohana Matsumae
- Last Exile: Fam, the Silver Wing – Sara Augusta
- Nekogami Yaoyorozu – Amane
- Pretty Rhythm Aurora Dream – Meganee Akai, Kaname Chris, Sonata Kanzaki (young), Narrator
- Ro-Kyu-Bu! – Aoi Ogiyama
- Sacred Seven – Wakana Itō
- Shinryaku!? Ika Musume – Sanae Nagatsuki
- Softenni – Asuna Harukaze
- The World God Only Knows II – Elucia de Rux Ima
- The World God Only Knows OVA: 4 Girls and an Idol – Elucia de Rux Ima

2012

- Mobile Suit Gundam AGE – Lu Anon
- Pretty Rhythm: Dear My Future – Meganee Akai, Hye In, Kaname Chris
- Shinryaku!! Ika Musume (OVA) – Sanae Nagatsuki
- Shining Hearts: Shiawase no Pan – Amil
- Sword Art Online – Yui
- The Ambition of Oda Nobuna – Nobuna Oda
- The World God Only Knows OVA: Tenri Arc – Elucia de Rux Ima
- To Love Ru Darkness – Nana Astar Deviluke

2013

- Haganai NEXT – Sena Kashiwazaki
- Fate/kaleid liner Prisma Illya – Suzuka Kurihara
- Photo Kano – Haruka Niimi
- Pretty Rhythm: Rainbow Live – Meganee Akai, Starn
- Ro-Kyu-Bu! SS – Aoi Ogiyama
- Strike the Blood – Kanon Kanase
- The Devil Is a Part-Timer! – Suzuno Kamazuki/Crestia Bell
- The World God Only Knows III – Elucia de Rux Ima
- A Certain Scientific Railgun S – Ruiko Saten
- A Certain Magical Index: The Movie – The Miracle of Endymion – Ruiko Saten

2014

- Fate/Kaleid liner Prisma Illya 2wei! – Suzuka Kurihara
- Girl Friend Beta – Marika Saeki
- Nanana's Buried Treasure – Yumeji Yurika
- Ōkami Shōjo to Kuro Ōji – Erika Shinohara
- Persona 4: The Animation – Ebihara Ai
- PriPara – Meganee Akai
- Sword Art Online II – Yui

2015

- Magical Girl Lyrical Nanoha ViVid – Miura Rinaldi (eps. 6–12)
- To Love Ru Darkness 2nd – Nana Astar Deviluke
- Aikatsu! – Kokone Kurisu
- Tai-Madō Gakuen 35 Shiken Shōtai – Mari Nikaidō
- God Eater – Hibari Takeda

2016

- Divine Gate – Midori
- High School Fleet – Kinesaki Homare, Kinesaki Akane
- One Piece – Carrot
- Love Live! Sunshine!! – Mito Takami
- ViVid Strike! – Miura Rinaldi

2017

- Idol Time PriPara – Meganee Akai
- Kemono Friends – Gray wolf (ep. 10, 12)
- Granblue Fantasy the Animation – Sturm (ep. 2–7)
- Angel's 3Piece! – Sakura Toriumi
- Land of the Lustrous – Amethyst

2018

- Gundam Build Divers – Nanami Nanase
- Harukana Receive – Ayasa Tachibana
- Kiratto Pri Chan – Meganee Akai

2019

- A Certain Scientific Accelerator – Ruiko Saten

2020

- A Certain Scientific Railgun T – Ruiko Saten

2021

- Full Dive – Cathy
- So I'm a Spider, So What? – Sachi Kudou
- Waccha PriMagi! – Tanto-chan, Meganee
- 180-Byō de Kimi no Mimi o Shiawase ni Dekiru ka? – Udoku Sawake

2022

- The Devil Is a Part-Timer!! – Suzuno Kamazuki/Crestia Bell

2023

- The Legend of Heroes: Trails of Cold Steel – Northern War – Campanella
- Yohane the Parhelion: Sunshine in the Mirror – Mito
- Sylvanian Families Freya no Go for Dream! – Teri Chocolate

2024

- Frieren – Ehre
- Himitsu no AiPri – Meganee Akai

=== Original net animation ===
2022

- Bastard!! -Heavy Metal, Dark Fantasy- – Lucien Renlen

=== Anime films ===
2011

- Children Who Chase Lost Voices – Seri

2013

- Hanasaku Iroha: The Movie – Home Sweet Home – Ohana Matsumae

2017

- Sword Art Online The Movie: Ordinal Scale – Yui

2020

- High School Fleet: The Movie – Kinesaki Homare, Kinesaki Akane

2023

- Sailor Moon Cosmos – Sailor Mnemosyne

=== Video games ===
- 7th Dragon 2020-II - Unit 13
- 7th Dragon III Code: VFD - Unit 13
- The Legend of Heroes: Trails to Azure – Campanella
- The Legend of Heroes: Trails of Cold Steel III – Campanella
- The Legend of Heroes: Trails of Cold Steel IV – Campanella, Grandmaster
- Accel World VS Sword Art Online: Millennium Twilight - Yui, Persona Vabel
- Blue Archive – Ruiko Saten
- Boku wa Tomodachi ga Sukunai Portable – Sena Kashiwazaki
- Chaos Rings III - Leary
- Digimon Story: Cyber Sleuth - Yuuko Kamishiro
- Digimon Story: Cyber Sleuth - Hacker's Memory - Yuuko Kamishiro
- Dragon Ball Xenoverse – Supreme Kai of Time
- Dragon Ball Xenoverse 2 - Supreme Kai of Time
- Dragon Ball Heroes - Supreme Kai of Time
- Durarara!!3way standoff - Chiaki Igarashi
- Dynasty Warriors,Warriors Orochi series and Musou Stars – Wang Yuanji
- Fate/Grand Order – Trưng Nhị
- Fragile Dreams: Farewell Ruins of the Moon – Girl, Servant 2
- Genshin Impact - Vodyanitsa
- Girls' Frontline - Am RFB, Shipka
- God Eater and God Eater 2 series – Hibari Takeda
- Granblue Fantasy – Sturm
- Groove Coaster Future Performers – Canon Himukai
- Honkai Impact 3rd – Timido Cute
- Hyperdimension Neptunia – Red
- Ima Sugu Oniichan ni Imōto da tte Iitai! – Nanase Matsuri
- Kemono Friends – Keroro Girl Type
- Lightning Returns: Final Fantasy XIII – Lumina
- Magia Record: Puella Magi Madoka Magica Side Story - Rika Ayano
- Million Arthur – Faye
- One Piece: Pirate Warriors 4 – Carrot
- Photo Kano – Haruka Niimi
- Persona 4 – Ai Ebihara, Yumi Ozawa
- Pretty Rhythm: Mini Skirt - Mega-nee Akai, Rizumu Amamiya
- Pretty Rhythm: Aurora Dream - Mega-nee Akai
- Pretty Rhythm: Dear My Future - Mega-nee Akai
- Pretty Rhythm: My Deco Rainbow Wedding - Mega-nee Akai
- Pretty Rhythm: Rainbow Live - Mega-nee Akai
- Pretty Rhythm: Rainbow Live Duo - Mega-nee Akai
- Pretty Rhythm: Rainbow Live: Kirakira My Design - Mega-nee Akai
- Pretty Rhythm: All Star Legend Coord Edition - Mega-nee Akai
- PriPara - Mega-nee Akai
- Idol Time PriPara - Mega-nee Akai
- Kiratto Pri Chan - Mega-nee Akai
- Rune Factory Oceans – Elena
- Shining Hearts – Nellis, Amyl, Aerie
- Sword Art Online: Infinity Moment – Yui
- Tales of the World: Radiant Mythology 2 – Kanonno Earhart
- Tales of the World: Radiant Mythology 3 – Kanonno Earhart
- Toaru Kagaku no Railgun – Ruiko Saten
- Toaru Majutsu to Kagaku no Ensemble – Ruiko Saten
- Tokyo Babel – Sorami Kugutsu
- Touhou Spell Bubble - Sanae Kochiya
- Valkyria Chronicles - Aisha Neumann, Nadine, Jane Turner
- Valkyrie Drive -Bhikkhuni-: Ranka Kagurazaka
- Counter: Side - Dash/Spira

=== Dubbing roles ===
- Cats and Peachtopia – Cape
- Angus, Thongs and Perfect Snogging – Libby Nicolson
- Criminal Minds – Jessica Brooks, Tracy Belle
- Deliver Us from Evil – Christina Sarchie
- FlashForward – Charlie Benford
- A Turtle's Tale: Sammy's Adventures – Sammy

== Discography ==
=== Albums ===
Year	Single details	Catalog No.	Peak Oricon chart positions
2011	Kokoro Keshiki (ココロケシキ; lit. 'Heart Scenery'): Released: November 23, 2011; Label: Lantis; Format: CD	LACA-35175 (Limited Edition), LACA-15175 (Regular Edition)	24
2013	Miageta Keshiki (ミアゲタケシキ; lit. 'Scenery Seen Above'): Released: April 3, 2013; Label: Lantis; Format: CD	LACA-35286 (Limited Edition), LACA-15286 (Regular Edition)	14

=== Singles ===
Year	Single details	Catalog No.	Peak Oricon chart positions	Album
2009	Yume Miru Kokoro (ユメ・ミル・ココロ; lit. "Dream-Watching Heart) (Taishō Baseball Girls ending theme): Released: August 5, 2009; Label: Lantis; Format: CD	LACM-4634	81	Kokoro Keshiki
2009	hide and seek: Released: December 9, 2009; Label: Lantis; Format: CD	LACM-4676	102	Kokoro Keshiki
2010	Ijiwaru na Koi (いじわるな恋; lit. 'The Mean Love') (Kyō, Koi o Hajimemasu ending theme): Released: September 8, 2010; Label: Lantis; Format: CD	LACM-4739	64	Kokoro Keshiki
2010	Metamerhythm (メタメリズム) (Squid Girl ending theme): Released: November 26, 2010; Label: Mellow Head; Format: CD	LACM-1083	52	Kokoro Keshiki
2011	Tsumasakidachi (つまさきだち; lit. 'Standing with Toes') (Softenni ending theme): Released: May 25, 2011; Label: Mellow Head; Format: CD	LHCM-31092 (Limited Edition), LHCM-1092 (Regular Edition)	29	Kokoro Keshiki
2012	Photokano Character Song Vol.1 Haruka Niimi (フォトカノ キャラクターソング Vol.1 新見遙佳): Released: April 5, 2012; Label: TWOFIVE Records; Format: CD	TRCD-10115		
2012	Puzzle/Beginner Driver (パズル / ビギナードライバー) (Squid Girl OVA ending theme): Released: August 8, 2012; Label: Lantis; Format: CD	LACM-4973	42	Miageta Keshiki
2012	COLORS!: Released: November 14, 2012; Label: Mellow Head; Format: CD	LACM-14023	29	Miageta Keshiki
2014	Happy Garland: Released: March 5, 2014; Label: Lantis; Format: CD	LACM-14211	54	TBA
2014	Loupe (ルーペ): Released: May 14, 2014; Label: Lantis; Format: CD	LACM-14212	37	TBA
2014	Uchi age Hanabi (打ち上げ花火): Released: July 9, 2014; Label: Lantis; Format: CD	LACM-14213		TBA
2014	Misers' Dream (マイザーズドリーム): Released: September 10, 2014; Label: Lantis; Format: CD	LACM-14214		TBA
