= Takako Honda =

Japanese voice actress and narrator (born 1972)

- 本田 貴子
- Born: August 14, 1972 (age 54); Tokyo, Japan
- Occupations: Voice actress; narrator
- Years active: 1998–present
- Agent: Office Osawa

Takako Honda (本田 貴子, Honda Takako; born August 14, 1972) is a Japanese voice actress and narrator affiliated with Office Osawa. She is the regular dubbing voice actress for Halle Berry, Hilary Swank, Milla Jovovich (especially in Resident Evil film series) and Charlize Theron. In 2006, Honda was chosen to succeed Atsuko Tanaka as Lara Croft in the Japanese dub of the Tomb Raider franchise, much like Atsuko, also eventually voicing the character in over five games.

== Filmography ==
=== Television animation ===
2000

- Ghost Stories – Hajime Aoyama
- Hamtaro – Noppo–kun in Tottoko Hamutaro

2001

- Figure 17 – Shinji Ogawa
- Hikaru no Go – Yuri Hidaka

2002

- Tokyo Mew Mew – Sakura Momomiya, Tomoya

2003

- Godannar – Kiriko Aoi
- Naruto – Anko Mitarashi

2004

- Bleach – Jinta Hanakari
- Tweeny Witches – Barunn, Hata

2005

- Cyborg 009 – Child Joe Shimamura
- Jigoku Shoujo – Hone-Onna
- Speed Grapher – Hibari Ginza
- Trinity Blood – Cardinal Caterina Sforza

2006

- Bleach – Dalk (Doll)
- Nana – Junko Saotome

2007

- D.Gray–man – Mahoja
- Darker than Black – April
- Naruto Shippuden – Anko Mitarashi
- Tengen Toppa Gurren Lagann – Gimmy and Leite
- Pokémon Diamond and Pearl – Pokémon Hunter J

2009

- Fullmetal Alchemist: Brotherhood – Martel

2010

- Cobra the Animation – Pamela Lee
- Marvel Anime: Iron Man – Chika Tanaka

2011

- Deadman Wonderland – Chief Guard Makina
- Hanasaku Iroha – Satsuki Matsumae
- Wandering Son – Hiroyuki Yoshida / Yuki

2014

- Cross Ange – Jill / Alektra Maria von Loewenherz

2017

- Boruto: Naruto Next Generations – Anko Mitarashi

2018

- Killing Bites – Kaede Kazama

2019

- Fairy Tail – Irene Belserion

2020

- Great Pretender – Farrah Brown

2021

- Those Snow White Notes – Umeko Sawamura
- My Hero Academia Season 5 – Chitose Kizuki
- Ranking of Kings – Shiina
- Blade Runner: Black Lotus – Alani Davis

2023

- Soaring Sky! Pretty Cure – Empress Underg

2025

- From Bureaucrat to Villainess: Dad's Been Reincarnated! – Mitsuko Tondabayashi
- Enter The Garden – Raizan
- Apocalypse Hotel – Mami

2026

- Tamon's B-Side – Izumi Shiraishi
- Daemons of the Shadow Realm – Left

==== Unknown date ====
- Bleach (Uryū Ishida (young))
- Mirmo! (Kuroro)
- Naruto Shippuden (Anko Mitarashi)
- Saint Seiya: The Lost Canvas (Behemoth Violate)
- Tsubasa Chronicle (Ashura)

=== Theatrical animation ===
- Dead Leaves (Pandy)
- The Garden of Sinners (movies) (Toko Aozaki)

=== Original net animation ===
- Cyberpunk: Edgerunners (2022) (Kiwi)

=== Video games ===
- Radiant Silvergun (1998) (Operator 2)
- Front Mission 5: Scars of the War (2005) (Lynn Wenright)
- Rogue Galaxy (2005) (Fable and Angela Seas)
- Valkyrie Profile 2: Silmeria (2006) (Iseria Queen)
- Tomb Raider: Legend (2006) (Lara Croft)
- Tomb Raider: Anniversary (2007) (Lara Croft)
- Odin Sphere (2007) (Elfaria and Odette)
- Soulcalibur IV (2008) (Angol Fear, Shura)
- Tomb Raider: Underworld (2008) (Lara Croft)
- Star Ocean: The Last Hope (2009) (Eleyna Farrence)
- Fallout: New Vegas (2010) (Rose of Sharon Cassidy)
- Lara Croft and the Guardian of Light (2010) (Lara Croft)
- Asura's Wrath (2012) (Olga)
- Epic Seven (2018) (Aramintha, Silver Blade Aramintha)

=== Drama CD ===
- Ambassador wa Yoru ni Sasayaku (????) (Caroline)
- GetBackers (????) (Dokubachi)
- Onimusha: Dawn of Dreams (????) (Shinobu Wind Demon #2)
- Princess Princess (????) (Mikoto Yutaka)
- Soul Eater (Vol. 1): Special Social Studies Field Trip (????) (Death the Kid)

=== Dubbing roles ===
==== Live-action ====
- Milla Jovovich
  - The Claim (Lucia)
  - No Good Deed (Erin)
  - Resident Evil (Alice)
  - You Stupid Man (Nadine)
  - Resident Evil: Apocalypse (Alice)
  - .45 (Kat)
  - Ultraviolet (Violet Song Jat Shariff)
  - Resident Evil: Extinction (Alice)
  - The Fourth Kind (Dr. Abigail "Abbey" Tyler)
  - A Perfect Getaway (Cydney)
  - Resident Evil: Afterlife (Alice)
  - Stone (Lucetta)
  - Faces in the Crowd (Anna Merchant)
  - Resident Evil: Retribution (Alice)
  - Cymbeline (Queen)
  - Survivor (Kate Abbott)
  - Resident Evil: The Final Chapter (Alice)
  - Shock and Awe (Vlatka Landay)
  - Hellboy (Vivienne Nimue, the Blood Queen)
  - Monster Hunter (Captain Natalie Artemis)
  - In the Lost Lands (Gray Alys)
- Halle Berry
  - Die Another Day (Giacinta 'Jinx' Johnson)
  - Gothika (Dr. Miranda Grey)
  - X2 (Ororo Munroe / Storm)
  - Catwoman (Patience Phillips / Catwoman)
  - X-Men: The Last Stand (Ororo Munroe / Storm)
  - Perfect Stranger (Rowena Price)
  - Cloud Atlas (Jocasta Ayrs/Luisa Rey/Ovid/Meronym/Native Woman/Indian Party Guest)
  - The Call (Jordan Turner)
  - X-Men: Days of Future Past (Ororo Munroe / Storm)
  - Kidnap (Karla Dyson)
  - Kingsman: The Golden Circle (Ginger Ale)
  - John Wick: Chapter 3 – Parabellum (Sofia)
  - Moonfall (Jocinda Fowler)
  - Crime 101 (Sharon Combs)
- Charlize Theron
  - Head in the Clouds (Gilda Bessé)
  - North Country (Josey Aimes)
  - The Burning Plain (Sylvia)
  - Hancock (Mary Embrey)
  - Prometheus (2017 The Cinema edition) (Meredith Vickers)
  - A Million Ways to Die in the West (Anna Barnes-Leatherwood)
  - Mad Max: Fury Road (Imperator Furiosa)
  - Dark Places (Libby Day)
  - Atomic Blonde (Lorraine Broughton)
  - Tully (Marlo Moreau)
  - Bombshell (Megyn Kelly)
  - The Old Guard (Andy)
  - The Odyssey (Calypso)
- Hilary Swank
  - Boys Don't Cry (Brandon Teena)
  - The Affair of the Necklace (Jeanne de Saint-Rémy de Valois)
  - Insomnia (Ellie Burr)
  - Million Dollar Baby (Margaret "Maggie" Fitzgerald)
  - The Black Dahlia (Madeleine Linscott)
  - P.S. I Love You (Holly Kennedy)
  - New Year's Eve (Nurse Aimee)
  - I Am Mother (Woman)
  - The Hunt (Athena Stone)
  - Ordinary Angels (Sharon)
- Cobie Smulders
  - The Avengers (Maria Hill)
  - Safe Haven (Carly / Jo)
  - Delivery Man (Emma)
  - Captain America: The Winter Soldier (Maria Hill)
  - Avengers: Age of Ultron (Maria Hill)
  - Jack Reacher: Never Go Back (Major Susan Turner)
  - Avengers: Infinity War (Maria Hill)
  - Spider-Man: Far From Home (Maria Hill)
  - Secret Invasion (Maria Hill)
- Rosario Dawson
  - 25th Hour (Naturelle Riviera)
  - The Adventures of Pluto Nash (Dina Lake)
  - Men in Black II (Laura Vasquez)
  - Sin City (Gail)
  - Seven Pounds (Emily Posa)
  - Unstoppable (Connie Hooper)
  - The Captive (Nicole Dunlop)
  - Sin City: A Dame to Kill For (Gail)
- Sandra Bullock
  - Divine Secrets of the Ya-Ya Sisterhood (Siddalee "Sidda" Walker)
  - The Lake House (Doctor Kate Forster)
  - Extremely Loud & Incredibly Close (Linda Schell)
  - The Heat (Sarah Ashburn)
  - Ocean's 8 (Debbie Ocean)
  - Bird Box (Malorie Hayes)
  - The Unforgivable (Ruth Slater)
  - The Lost City (Loretta Sage)
- Jessica Biel
  - The Texas Chainsaw Massacre (Erin Hardesty)
  - Blade: Trinity (2007 TV Tokyo edition) (Abigail Whistler)
  - Home of the Brave (SGT Vanessa Price)
  - I Now Pronounce You Chuck and Larry (Alex McDonough)
  - Valentine's Day (Kara Monahan)
  - Total Recall (Melina)
  - The Sinner (Cora Tannetti)
- Michelle Monaghan
  - Eagle Eye (Rachel Holloman)
  - Machine Gun Preacher (Lynn Childers)
  - The Best of Me (Amanda Collier)
  - Pixels (Lieutenant Colonel Violet Van Patten)
  - The Vanishing of Sidney Hall (Velouria Hall)
- Elizabeth Banks
  - The 40-Year-Old Virgin (Beth)
  - Slither (Starla Grant)
  - Role Models (Beth Willett)
  - Definitely, Maybe (Emily Jones)
  - The Next Three Days (Lara Brennan)
- Jada Pinkett Smith
  - The Matrix Reloaded (Niobe)
  - The Matrix Revolutions (Niobe)
  - Hawthorne (Christina Hawthorne)
  - Gotham (Fish Mooney)
  - The Matrix Resurrections (Niobe)
- 2046 (Wang Jing-wen (Faye Wong))
- 3 Ninjas: High Noon at Mega Mountain (Jeffrey "Colt" Douglas (Michael O'Laskey II))
- The 355 (Graciela Rivera (Penélope Cruz))
- Alien vs. Predator (Alexa Woods (Sanaa Lathan))
- Alita: Battle Angel (Gelda (Michelle Rodriguez))
- Alvin and the Chipmunks: The Squeakquel (Jeanette (Anna Faris))
- Alvin and the Chipmunks: Chipwrecked (Jeanette (Anna Faris))
- American Outlaws (Zee Mimms (Ali Larter))
- Anatomy (Gretchen (Anna Loos))
- Andromeda (Andromeda Ascendant, Rommie (Lexa Doig))
- Angel-A (Angela (Rie Rasmussen))
- Anna Magdalena (Mok Man-yee (Kelly Chen))
- Annie (Miss Colleen Hannigan (Cameron Diaz))
- Another Life (Niko Breckinridge (Katee Sackhoff))
- The Astronaut's Wife (Nan (Clea DuVall))
- Bad Boys II (Special Agent Sydney "Syd" Burnett (Gabrielle Union))
- Barbie (Gloria (America Ferrera))
- Battlestar Galactica (Lieutenant Kara "Starbuck" Thrace (Katee Sackhoff))
- Beautiful Boy (Karen Barbour-Sheff (Maura Tierney))
- Bionic Woman (Sarah Corvus (Katee Sackhoff))
- Blindspot (Remi "Jane Doe" Briggs (Jaimie Alexander))
- Brain Games (Tiffany Haddish)
- Bring It On (Isis (Gabrielle Union))
- Bruce Almighty (Susan Ortega (Catherine Bell))
- The Cave (Charlie (Piper Perabo))
- The Chronicles of Riddick (Jack / Kyra (Alexa Davalos))
- Clash of the Titans (2012 TV Asahi edition) (Io (Gemma Arterton))
- Code Name Banshee (Delilah (Jaime King))
- Contagion (Elizabeth Emhoff (Gwyneth Paltrow))
- Crazy, Stupid, Love (Robbie (Jonah Bobo))
- Dark Kingdom: The Dragon King (Brunhild (Kristanna Loken))
- The Dark Knight (Rachel Dawes (Maggie Gyllenhaal))
- Day of the Dead (2020 Blu-ray edition) (Dr. Sarah Bowman (Lori Cardille))
- The Departed (Dr. Madolyn Madden (Vera Farmiga))
- Devour (Dakota (Dominique Swain))
- Diary of the Dead (Debra Moynihan (Michelle Morgan))
- Dune (Dr. Liet-Kynes (Sharon Duncan-Brewster))
- Enter the Fat Dragon (Chloe Song / Chloe Zhu (Niki Chow))
- Exit Speed (Corporal Meredith Cole (Julie Mond))
- The Exorcist: Believer (Miranda West (Jennifer Nettles))
- F1 (Bernadette Pearce (Sarah Niles))
- The Faculty (Stokely "Stokes" Mitchell (Clea DuVall))
- Falling Skies (Anne Glass-Mason (Moon Bloodgood))
- The Family Stone (Julie Morton (Claire Danes))
- Fast & Furious (2011 TV Asahi edition) (Letty Ortiz (Michelle Rodriguez))
- Frankenfish (Eliza (K. D. Aubert))
- G-Force (Juarez (Penélope Cruz))
- Game of Thrones (Cersei Lannister (Lena Headey))
- Gamer (Angie "Nika" Roth Tillman (Amber Valletta))
- Gia (Gia Carangi (Angelina Jolie))
- The Gifted (Reeva Payge (Grace Byers))
- Girl, Interrupted (Georgina Tuskin (Clea DuVall))
- The Golden Compass (Serafina Pekkala (Eva Green))
- Gone Girl (Margo "Go" Dunne (Carrie Coon))
- Gridlock'd (Barbara "Cookie" Cook (Thandie Newton))
- Halo (Riz-028 (Natasha Culzac))
- Hannah Montana: The Movie (Tyra Banks)
- Harper's Island (Abby Mills (Elaine Cassidy))
- Heidi (Rottenmeier (Katharina Schüttler))
- Hellboy (Liz Sherman (Selma Blair))
- Hellboy II: The Golden Army (Liz Sherman (Selma Blair))
- Henry's Crime (Julie Ivanova (Vera Farmiga))
- Hwang Jini (Hwang Jini (Ha Ji-won))
- Indiana Jones and the Kingdom of the Crystal Skull (Colonel-Doctor Irina Spalko (Cate Blanchett))
- Jay and Silent Bob Strike Back (Justice (Shannon Elizabeth))
- John Q. (2007 NTV edition) (Denise Archibald (Kimberly Elise))
- Just like Heaven (Elizabeth Masterson (Reese Witherspoon))
- L.A.'s Finest (Special Agent Sydney "Syd" Burnett (Gabrielle Union))
- Liar (Katy Sutcliffe (Zoë Tapper))
- Limitless (FBI Special Agent Rebecca Harris (Jennifer Carpenter))
- The Lord of the Rings: The Two Towers (Éowyn (Miranda Otto))
- The Lord of the Rings: The Return of the King (Éowyn (Miranda Otto))
- Lucifer ("Mum" / Goddess (Tricia Helfer))
- Man on Fire (Lisa Ramos (Radha Mitchell))
- Masters of the Universe (The Sorceress (Morena Baccarin))
- Matilda the Musical (Mrs Phelps (Sindhu Vee))
- Mesrine (Jeanne Schneider (Cécile de France))
- A Mighty Heart (Mariane Pearl (Angelina Jolie))
- The Monkey King (Guan Yin (Kelly Chen))
- The Monkey King 2 (Guan Yin (Kelly Chen))
- New Police Story (Sue Chow (Coco Chiang))
- Night at the Museum: Secret of the Tomb (Sacagawea (Mizuo Peck))
- Obsessed (Lisa Sheridan (Ali Larter))
- One Battle After Another (Perfidia Beverly Hills (Teyana Taylor))
- Painkiller Jane (Jane Vasco (Kristanna Loken))
- Pepper Dennis (Pepper Dennis (Rebecca Romijn))
- The Perfect Guy (Leah Vaughn (Sanaa Lathan))
- Personal Shopper (Lara (Sigrid Bouaziz))
- Phone Booth (Kelly Shepard (Radha Mitchell))
- Pirates of the Caribbean: On Stranger Tides (Angelica (Penélope Cruz))
- Police Story (2012 Ultimate Blu-Ray edition) (Selina Fong (Brigitte Lin))
- Primeval (Aviva Masters (Brooke Langton))
- Prison Break (Sara Tancredi (Sarah Wayne Callies))
- Private Practice (Charlotte King (KaDee Strickland))
- The Protector (Laura Shapiro (Saun Ellis))
- The Purge (Mary Sandin (Lena Headey))
- Railroad Tigers (Yuko (Zhang Lanxin))
- Rampage (Dr. Kate Caldwell (Naomie Harris))
- REC (Ángela Vidal (Manuela Velasco))
- REC 2 (Ángela Vidal (Manuela Velasco))
- The Recruit (Layla Moore (Bridget Moynahan))
- Ring Around the Rosie (Wendy Baldwin (Jenny Mollen))
- Roman J. Israel, Esq. (Maya Alston (Carmen Ejogo))
- Scott Pilgrim vs. the World (Ramona Flowers (Mary Elizabeth Winstead))
- Secret Garden (Gil Ra-im (Ha Ji-won))
- The Secret Life of Bees (June Boatwright (Alicia Keys))
- The Seeker: The Dark Is Coming (Will Stanton (Alexander Ludwig))
- Serial Mom (2025 BS10 Star Channel edition) (Beverly Sutphin (Kathleen Turner))
- Shark Lake (Meredith Hernandez (Sara Malakul Lane))
- Shaun of the Dead (Liz (Kate Ashfield))
- She Said (Megan Twohey (Carey Mulligan))
- Shiri (Lee Myung-hyun/Lee Bang-hee (Yunjin Kim))
- Six Feet Under (Brenda Chenowith (Rachel Griffiths))
- Skiptrace (Dasha (Eve Torres))
- Snakehead Swamp (Carley (Terri Garber))
- A Sound of Thunder (Jenny Krase (Jemima Rooper))
- The Staircase (Kathleen Peterson (Toni Collette))
- Star Trek: Enterprise (T'Pol (Jolene Blalock))
- Stick It (Haley Graham (Missy Peregrym))
- S.W.A.T. (Captain Jessica Cortez (Stephanie Sigman))
- Taxi (Lieutenant Marta Robbins (Jennifer Esposito))
- Terminator 3: Rise of the Machines (2005 NTV edition) (T-X (Kristanna Loken))
- The Thing (Kate Lloyd (Mary Elizabeth Winstead))
- The Third Man (New Era Movies edition) (Anna Schmidt (Alida Valli))
- Third Person (Monika (Moran Atias))
- Thirteen Ghosts (Kathy Kriticos (Shannon Elizabeth))
- Those Who Wish Me Dead (Hannah (Angelina Jolie))
- Tokyo Raiders (Macy (Kelly Chen))
- Top Gun: Maverick (Penelope "Penny" Benjamin (Jennifer Connelly))
- Transformers: Rise of the Beasts (Airazor (Michelle Yeoh))
- Trash (Gardo (Eduardo Luis))
- The Tuxedo (Steena (Debi Mazar))
- Under Paris (Sophia (Bérénice Bejo))
- V.I.P. (Vallery Irons (Pamela Anderson))
- The Voices (Fiona (Gemma Arterton))
- Weird Science (Lisa (Kelly LeBrock))
- White House Down (Carol Finnerty (Maggie Gyllenhaal))
- Wonka (Willy Wonka's mother (Sally Hawkins))
- xXx (J.J. (Eve))
- Years and Years (Celeste Bisme-Lyons (T'Nia Miller))
- Zombieland: Double Tap (Wichita (Emma Stone))

==== Animation ====
- Buzz Lightyear of Star Command (Mira Nova)
- The Cat in the Hat (Carmen)
- Epic (Queen Tara)
- Ferdinand (Lupe)
- Kung Fu Panda 3 (Master Tigress)
- Mars Needs Moms (Milo's Mother)
- Meet the Robinsons (Franny)
- My Little Pony: The Movie (Princess Luna)
- Puss in Boots (Kitty Softpaws)
- The Lord of the Rings: The War of the Rohirrim (Olwin)
- Turbo (Paz)
- Star Wars: Droids (2005 DVD edition) (Jessica Meade)
