= Taro Yamaguchi =

Japanese voice actor

Taro Yamaguchi (山口 太郎, Yamaguchi Tarō; born 6 June 1970) is a Japanese voice actor.

== Filmography ==
=== Television animation ===
- Argevollen (xxxx) as Bernard Gaap
- Bakugan Battle Brawlers (xxxx) as Clayf/Glaive
- Bakugan Battle Brawlers New Vestroia (xxxx) as Clayf/Glaive
- Bleach (2004) as Chōjirō Sasakibe; Niidaa Sword; Rudobone
- Bleach: Thousand Year Blood War (2022) as Chōjirō Sasakibe
- Eureka Seven (xxxx) as Hap
- Ghost in the Shell: Stand Alone Complex (2002–05) as Borma
- Glass Fleet (xxxx) as Hizack
- Godannar (xxxx) as Kagemaru
- High School DxD BorN (xxxx) as Tannin
- Honey and Clover (xxxx) as Yamada's Father (ep 7)
- Honey and Clover II (xxxx) as Yamada's father (ep 3)
- Inuyasha (xxxx) as Kanta's Father
- Ninja Nonsense (xxxx) as Gomorrha
- One Piece (2020) as Dobon, Kurozumi Semimaru, Joseph, Iscat
- One Punch Man (2019) as Bakuzan
- Rockman.EXE Stream (2005) as Yamatoman
- Rockman.EXE Beast (2006) as Zoano Yamatoman
- Zegapain (xxxx) as Dao-Yu
- Mobile Suit Gundam SEED Destiny (2004) as Sato (Pilot of Ginn2 in attempt to drop Junius 7 to Earth, appeared in eps 5–7,17 & 41)
- That Time I Got Reincarnated as a Slime (2018) as Geld

=== Original video animation (OVA) ===
- Ghost in the Shell: Stand Alone Complex - Individual Eleven (2005) as Borma
- Ghost in the Shell: Stand Alone Complex - The Laughing Man (2006) as Borma
- Kujibiki Unbalance (xxxx) as Kenji Suzuki 2 (tall)

=== Original net animation (ONA) ===
- Ghost in the Shell: SAC 2045 (2020) as Borma

=== Theatrical animation ===
- Ghost in the Shell: Stand Alone Complex - Solid State Society (xxxx) as Borma

=== Dubbing ===
- Ad Astra as Willie Levant (Sean Blakemore)
- The Bold Type as Oliver Grayson (Stephen Conrad Moore)
- Me Before You as Nathan (Steve Peacocke)
- The Pacific as Pfc. Lew "Chuckler" Juergens (Josh Helman)
