= Broken square =

Term referring to an infantry square collapsing or breaking up in battle

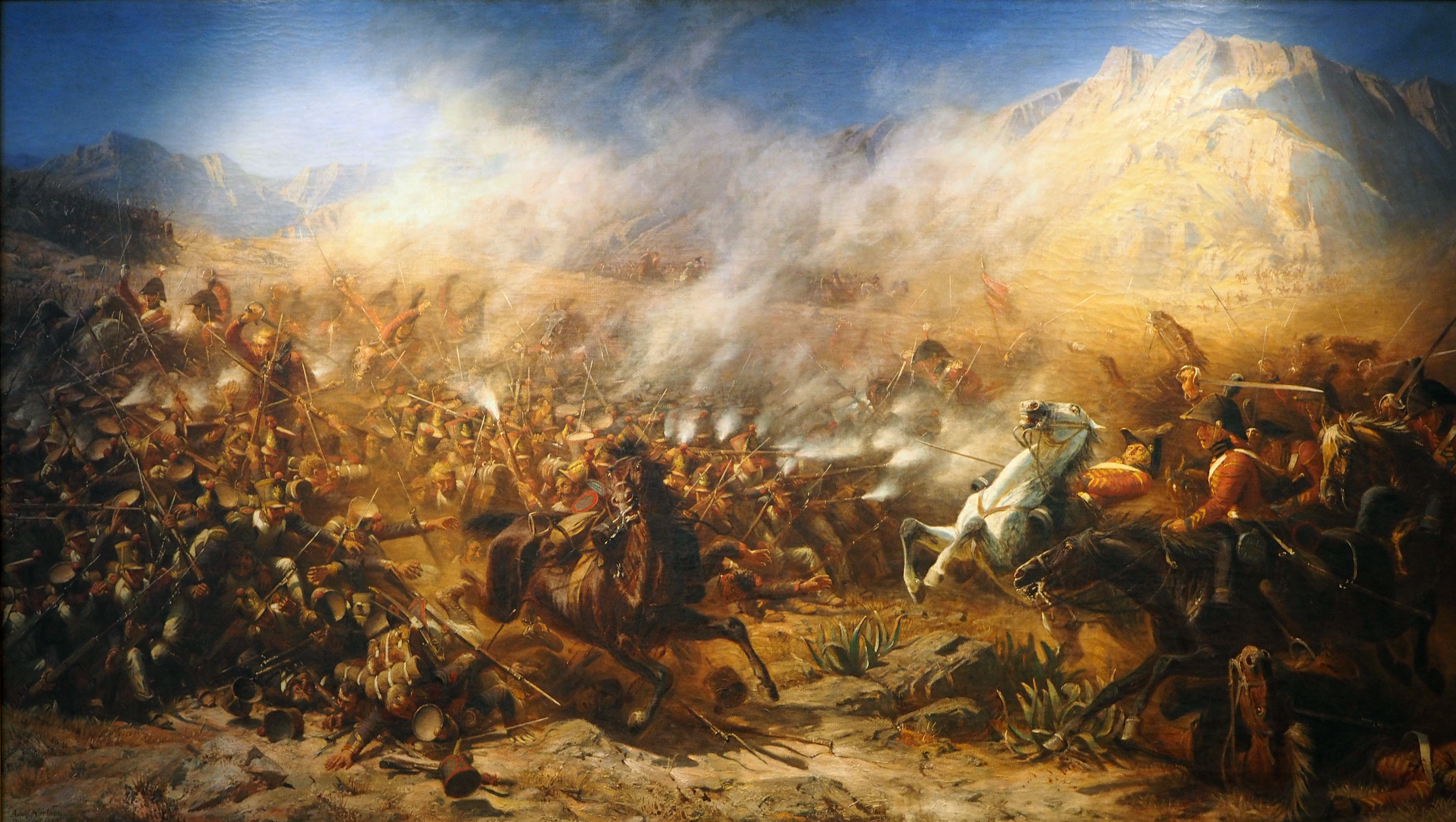
A painting of the Battle of García Hernández by Adolph Northen depicting a French infantry square being broken.

A broken square is an infantry square that has collapsed or broken up in battle.

Specific incidents that this expression may refer to are all in the Mahdist War in the Sudan:

- At the Battle of Abu Klea: the breach was small and soon closed itself, leaving the intruders trapped inside the square, whose inner ranks faced-about and quickly defeated the intruders. See Battle of Abu Klea#Battle for the real events at Abu Klea.
  In an after-battle report, The Times newspaper incorrectly had it that a British square broke.
- At the Battle of Tamai:
  1. The Black Watch formed one side of a big square under attack, and was ordered by top command to leave that post (leaving their side of that square open) and attack another enemy force which was hidden down a desert gully.
  2. The restricted rocky irregular ground in that gully made it difficult to form a solid square to resist attack; that square came under intense attack from Sudanese (here, mostly Hadendoa). The square was flooded with a rush of tribesmen and a brutal hand-to-hand fight resulted. The Black Watch were driven back but rallied and eventually drove the Sudanese out, with the square being reformed.

After the Mahdist War, the poet Sir Henry Newbolt got his information very wrong (and may have confused these two battles with each other) and wrote a poem named Vitaï Lampada describing a disastrous collapse. Or he may have intended to write a fictional "worst case" scenario, with the message "even if the worst happens, keep on fighting back", but many readers thought wrongly that he was describing real events.

Frank Richards, a soldier in the Royal Welch Fusiliers around 1901, stated in his memoir entitled Soldier Sahib: "If a Welshman went into a pub where a Highland soldier was, of the regiment whose square was once broken by the Mahdi's dervishes in the Sudan, he would sometimes ask for a 'pint of broken-square'. Then he would have his bellyful of scrapping for the rest of the night, because this was an insult the Highlanders could not forgive." Robert Graves, who also served in the Royal Welch, told a similar story.

In Spain in the Napoleonic War, at the Battle of García Hernández, three French squares were broken in the same day resulting in a very one sided victory for the British and Germans.

For more information about infantry squares breaking or not breaking, see Battle of García Hernández#Commentary.

In the Napoleonic Wars, when cavalry broke an infantry square, it was usually because one or more of the following factors:

- The infantry were of poor quality.
- The infantry were tired or disorganized or discouraged
- It was raining, with risk of rain wetting the men's gunpowder, as firearms were at the time.
- The infantry fired a poorly aimed volley.
- The infantry waited too long to fire.

== See also ==
- Fuzzy-Wuzzy
