= Eberhardt Otto George von Bock =

Hanoverian army officer (1755–1814)

Major-General Eberhardt Otto George von Bock
- Born: 1755; Electorate of Hanover
- Died: 21 January 1814 (aged 58–59); Bay of Biscay
- Burial place: Pleubian, France
- Military career
- Allegiance: Electorate of Hanover; United Kingdom
- Branch: Hanoverian Army; British Army
- Service years: 1781–1803: Hanover; 1804–1814: United Kingdom
- Rank: Major-General (British Army)
- Unit: King's German Legion
- Commands: Life Guard Cavalry Regiment (Hanover); 1st Dragoons (KGL); Heavy Dragoon Brigade (KGL); 1st Cavalry Division
- Conflicts: Napoleonic Wars; Battle of Salamanca; Battle of García Hernández; Battle of Majadahonda; Siege of Burgos; Battle of Venta del Pozo; Battle of Vitoria
- Awards: Army Gold Medal

Major-General Eberhardt Otto George von Bock (1755 – 21 January 1814) was a Hanoverian army officer who served in the Hanoverian and British armies and fought in the French Revolutionary and Napoleonic Wars.

== Biography ==
Bock was descended from an old military family, and joined the Hanoverian Army around 1781. His name appears as a premier-lieutenant in the 6th Hanoverian dragoons in 1789, and as Rittmeister (transl. captain) in 1800. He served in the Hanoverian Garde du Corps under Freytag in the Flanders Campaign and was slightly wounded by two sabre cuts on the arm and head at the Battle of Famars 23 May 1793.

On the dissolution of the Hanoverian Army after the convention of Artlenburg, Bock was one of the officers who travelled to England, where he raised four troops of heavy cavalry, designated as the 1st dragoons, King's German Legion, and was gazetted colonel 21 April 1804. The regiment was formed at Weymouth, and was a particular favourite of George III. Bock served at its head in Lord Cathcart's expedition to Hanover in 1805; also in Ireland, whither it was sent after its return home. From Ireland Bock, who had attained the rank of major-general in 1810, proceeded to the Peninsular War in 1811 in command of a brigade composed of the two heavy cavalry regiments of the Legion, with which he made the subsequent campaigns in Spain and the south of France in 1812–13. The steadiness and gallantry of Bock's heavy Germans often won approval, particularly on 23 July 1812, the day after the victory at Salamanca, when in a charge at Garcia Hernandez, they attacked, broke and made prisoner three battalions of French infantry formed in square, usually thought of as a formation impregnable to cavalry.

Bock was made temporary commander of Wellington's Cavalry during Cotton's convalescence July–October 1812, and again December 1812-June 1813. He served in the rearguard during the retreat from Burgos 1812, mishandling an ambush at Venta del Pozo (Villadrigo) 23 October. In 1813 he served at Vitoria 21 June.

Bock suffered from being very short sighted – before the charge at Garcia Hernandez he had to ask to be pointed in the direction of the enemy.

On 21 January 1814, Bock was drowned together with his son Lewis and other officers when the transport ship Bellona was wrecked on the Tulbest rocks, en route to England. His body was washed on shore at the little Breton village of Pleubian and interred.

== Sources ==
- Chichester, Henry Manners (1886). "Bock, Eberhardt Otto George von" . In Stephen, Leslie (ed.). Dictionary of National Biography. Vol. 5. London: Smith, Elder & Co. p. 287.
- Haythornthwaite, Philip. British Cavalryman 1792-1815. Warrior Series. Osprey.
