= Timeline of the Napoleonic era =

Battles of Napoleon Bonaparte
Napoleon as subordinate
Napoleon in command

Napoleon Bonaparte (15 August 1769 – 5 May 1821) was a French military and political leader who rose to prominence during the latter stages of the French Revolution and the Napoleonic Wars.

== Early years ==
1769

- August 15: Napoleon was born in Ajaccio, Corsica

1785

- October 28: Napoleon graduates from Ecole Militaire with the rank of second lieutenant in the artillery.
- November 3: Stationed in Valence

1793

- December 22: For his brilliant tactical command (although a subordinate officer, he was widely credited for the victory) at an internal French Siege of Toulon, Napoleon receives the new rank of brigadier general

1794

- August 9–20: Napoleon is imprisoned under suspicion of being a Jacobin and a supporter of Robespierre.

1795

- October: Royalist 13 Vendémiaire rising put down by Napoleon. Barras helps Napoleon win promotion to Commander of the Interior
- October 15: At the home of Paul Barras, a Directory member, Napoleon meets Rose de Beauharnais (Joséphine)
- 2 November: The French Directory (in French: "le Directoire") was established

1796

- March 2: Napoleon is given command of the French army in Italy
- March 11: Italian campaign against Austria begins
- May 10: Napoleon wins the Battle of Lodi
- November 17: Napoleon wins the Battle of Arcole

1797

- January 14: Napoleon wins the Battle of Rivoli
- October 17: Treaty of Campo Formio with Austria
- December 5: Napoleon returns to Paris as a hero

1798

- May 19: Napoleon begins his Egyptian campaign with an army of 38,000
- July 21: Wins Battle of the Pyramids against Mamelukes in Egypt
- July 24: Fall of Cairo
- August 3: Under the command of Admiral Nelson, the British fleet destroys the French navy in the Battle of the Nile. Napoleon's army is cut off from supplies and communication

== Napoleonic era ==
1799

- August 23: Receiving news of turmoil in France, Napoleon relinquishes command in Egypt to Kléber and returns to Paris, a so-called Coup d’état
- November 9–10: Coup of 18 Brumaire Napoleon overthrows the Directory
- December 12: Napoleon elected First Consul of the Consulate

1800

- June 14: Battle of Marengo
- December 24: Napoleon escapes an assassination attempt

1801

- February 9: Treaty with Austria signed at Lunéville, Treaty of Lunéville
- July 8: Battle of Algeciras
- July 15: Concordat of 1801

1802

- March 25: Treaty of Amiens
- May 1: Napoleon restructures the French educational system
- May 19: Légion d'honneur established
- August 2: New constitution adopted, plebiscite confirms Napoleon as First Consul for life

1803

- May 3: Napoleon sells the Louisiana Territory to the U.S.
- May 18: Britain declares war on France
- May 26: France invades Hanover

1804

- March 21: Introduction of the Civil Code (also known as Napoleonic Code)
- May 18: Napoleon proclaimed Emperor of the French by the Senate
- December 2: Napoleon crowns himself emperor, in the company of the Pope

1805

- October 19: Battle of Ulm
- October 21: Battle of Trafalgar; Admiral Lord Nelson killed
- October 30: Battle of Caldiero
- December 2: Battle of Austerlitz

1806

- March 30: Napoleon names his brother, Joseph Bonaparte, King of Naples, and appoints other family members to various other posts
- July 12: Confederation of the Rhine established with Napoleon as Protector. Initially had 16 member states, later others were added, including kingdoms of Saxony and Westphalia
- August 6: Holy Roman Empire abolished
- September 15: Prussia joins Britain and Russia against Napoleon
- October 14: Battle of Jena and Battle of Auerstadt
- November 21: The Berlin Decree (1806), which initiated the Continental System was issued

1807

- February 8: Battle of Eylau
- June 14: Battle of Friedland
- June 25: Treaty of Tilsit signed between Russia and France
- October 27: Treaty of Fontainebleau (1807) secretly agreed between Napoleon and Spain to partition Portugal

1808

- March 17: Imperial University established
- May 2: Spanish people rise up against France. Often referred to as Dos de Mayo Uprising
- May 3: Napoleon's soldiers retaliate for uprising by brutally executing Spanish citizens (famously depicted in Goya's The Third of May 1808)
- July 7: Joseph crowned King of Spain after Portugal revolts against the Continental System/blockade Napoleon had put in place. Napoleon collected five armies to advance into Portugal and 'bullied' the Spanish royal family into resigning
- Peninsular War
- July 16–19: Battle of Bailén

1809

- April 19: Battle of Raszyn
- May 22: Battle of Aspern-Essling; first defeat of Napoleon in 10 years
- July 5–6: Battle of Wagram; success for Napoleon, Austria loses territory and must enforce the Continental System
- July 27-28: Battle of Talavera
- October 14: Treaty of Schönbrunn signed
- December 14: Public announcement of Napoleon's divorce from Joséphine

1810

- March 11: Napoleon marries Marie Louise of Austria by proxy in Vienna
- April 1: Napoleon officially marries Marie Louise, Duchess of Parma in Paris

1811

- March 20: Napoleon II, Napoleon's son born, styled as the King of Rome

1812

- July 22: Battle of Salamanca
- August 4–6: Battle of Smolensk
- September 1: Moscow evacuated
- September 7: Battle of Borodino
- September 14: Napoleon arrives in Moscow to find the city abandoned and set alight by the inhabitants; retreating in the midst of a frigid winter, the army suffers great losses
- October 19: Beginning of the Great Retreat from Moscow
- October 24: Battle of Maloyaroslavets
- November: Crossing of the River Berezina
- December: Grande Armée expelled from Russia

1813

- August 31: Battle of San Marcial
- September 6: Battle of Dennewitz
- September 16: Battle of the Göhrde
- September 28: Battle of Altenburg
- October 3: Battle of Wartenburg
- October 7: Battle of the Bidassoa
- October 14: Battle of Liebertwolkwitz
- October 16–19: Battle of Leipzig
- October 30–31: Battle of Hanau
- November 10: Battle of Nivelle
- October 31: End of the Siege of Pamplona
- December 7: Battle of Bornhöved
- December 9–13: Battles of the Nive
- December 10: Battle of Sehested

1814

- February 10–14: Six Days Campaign
- February 15: Battle of Garris
- February 27: Battle of Orthez
- April 10: Battle of Toulouse
- March 30–31: Battle of Paris
- April 4: Napoleon abdicates his rule and Louis XVIII, a Bourbon, is restored to the French throne
- April 11: Treaty of Fontainebleau (1814) Napoleon agrees to exile in Elba, the allies agree to pay his family a pension
- April 14: Battle of Bayonne
- May 4: Napoleon is exiled to Elba; his wife and son take refuge in Vienna

1815

- February 26: Napoleon escapes from Elba
- March 20: Napoleon arrives in Paris

Beginning of the Hundred Days

- June 16: Battle of Ligny
- June 18: Napoleon is defeated in the Battle of Waterloo
- June 28: Second restoration of Louis XVIII
- October 16: Napoleon is exiled to Saint Helena
- November 20: Treaty of Paris (1815)

1821

- May 5: Napoleon dies

== See also ==
- Timeline of French history
- Timeline of 19th century French history
