= Timeline of 19th-century French history =

In the 19th century, France experienced a succession of political regimes, rapid industrialization, and significant social upheaval. It transitioned through two empires, two monarchies, and two republics and evolved from a centralized military power (often governed by kings or self-proclaimed emperors) into a modern industrial democracy. After undergoing frequent and violent revolutions–notably in 1830, 1848, and 1871–the century concluded with the stabilization of the Third Republic and the construction of the institutional foundations of modern France.

== Overview ==
This timeline is organized in the following sections:

- Rise and Fall of the First Empire (1800–1815) – This was the empire ruled by Napoleon Bonaparte, who established French hegemony over much of continental Europe at the beginning of the 19th century.
- The Bourbon Restoration (1815–1830) was the return to power of the House of Bourbon (a branch of the Capetian dynasty, the royal House of France) after the fall of Napoleon.
- The July Monarchy (1830–1848) was a liberal constitutional monarchy under Louis Philippe I, starting with the revolutionary victory in the July Revolution of 1830, and ending with the Revolution of 1848.
- The Second Republic and a coup-d’état (1848–1851) — Napoleon's nephew, Louis-Napoléon Bonaparte, established himself as a popular anti-establishment figure and was elected president of the newly created Second Republic in 1848.
- The Second French Empire (1852–1870) was established on 2 December 1852 by Louis-Napoléon Bonaparte, president of France under the French Second Republic, who proclaimed himself Emperor of the French as Napoleon III.
- The Third Republic and the Belle Époque (1870–1900) — The Third Republic was France's system of democratic government from 4 September 1870, when the Second French Empire collapsed during the Franco-Prussian War, until 10 July 1940, after the Fall of France during World War II. The Belle Époque was a period of optimism, enlightenment, regional peace, economic prosperity, nationalism, colonial expansion, and technological, scientific and artistic innovations.

== Rise and Fall of the First Empire (1800–1815) ==
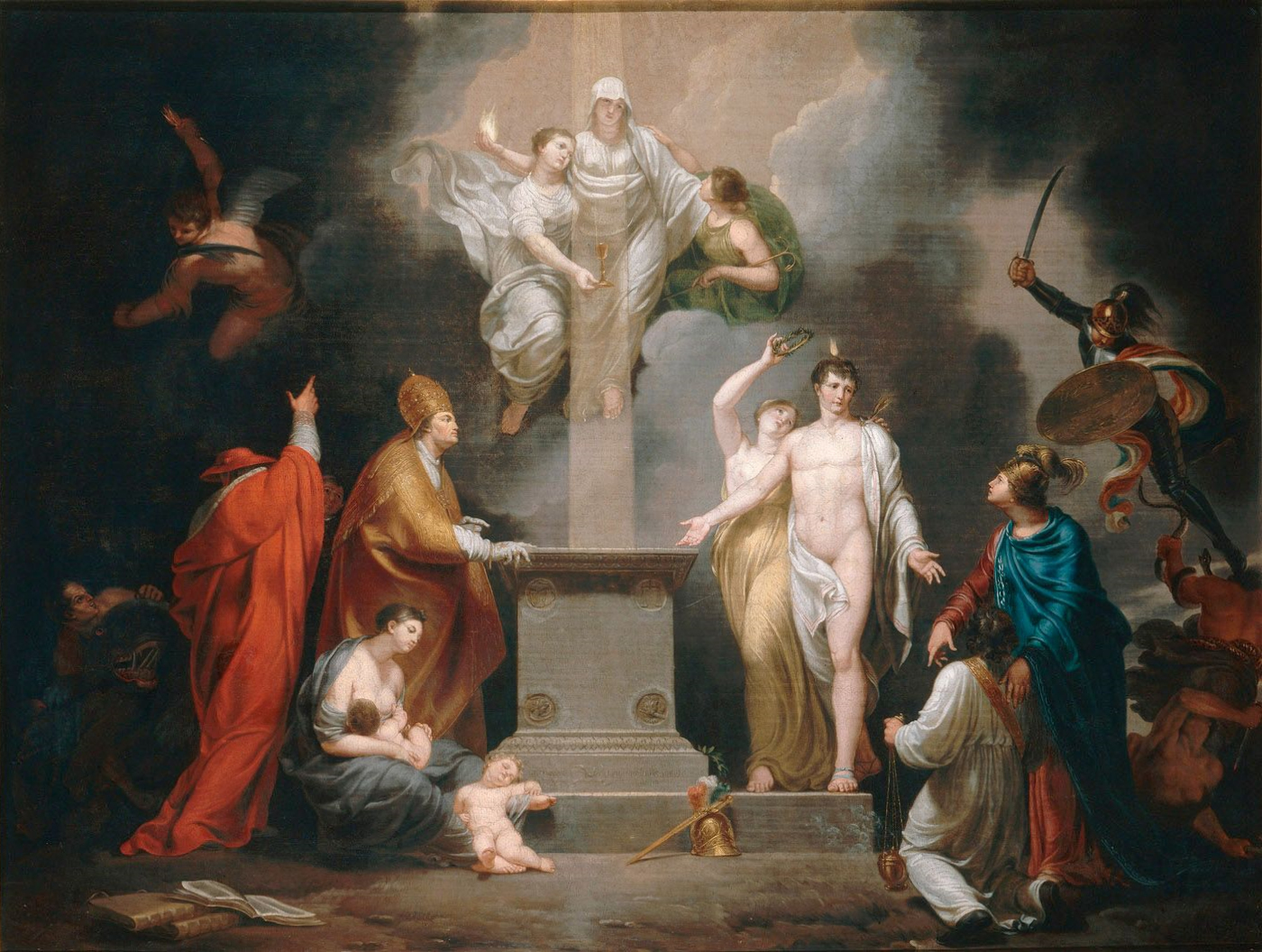
Allegory of the Concordat of 1801, by Pierre Joseph Célestin François

1800: Napoleon establishes the Bank of France to stabilize the economy after the Revolution. Three years later, the Bank received its first official charter granting it the exclusive right to issue paper money in Paris for fifteen years.

1801: The Concordat of 1801 is signed with Pope Pius VII, reconciling the French state with the Catholic Church and solidified the Catholic Church as the majority church of France. Most of the Church’s civil status was restored after having been taken away during the Revolution. It remained in effect until 1905, except in Alsace–Lorraine, where it remains in force.

1802: The Legion of Honour (Légion d'honneur) is established as the highest and most prestigious French national order of merit, both military and civil. The order has been retained, with occasional minor alterations, by all subsequent French governments and regimes.

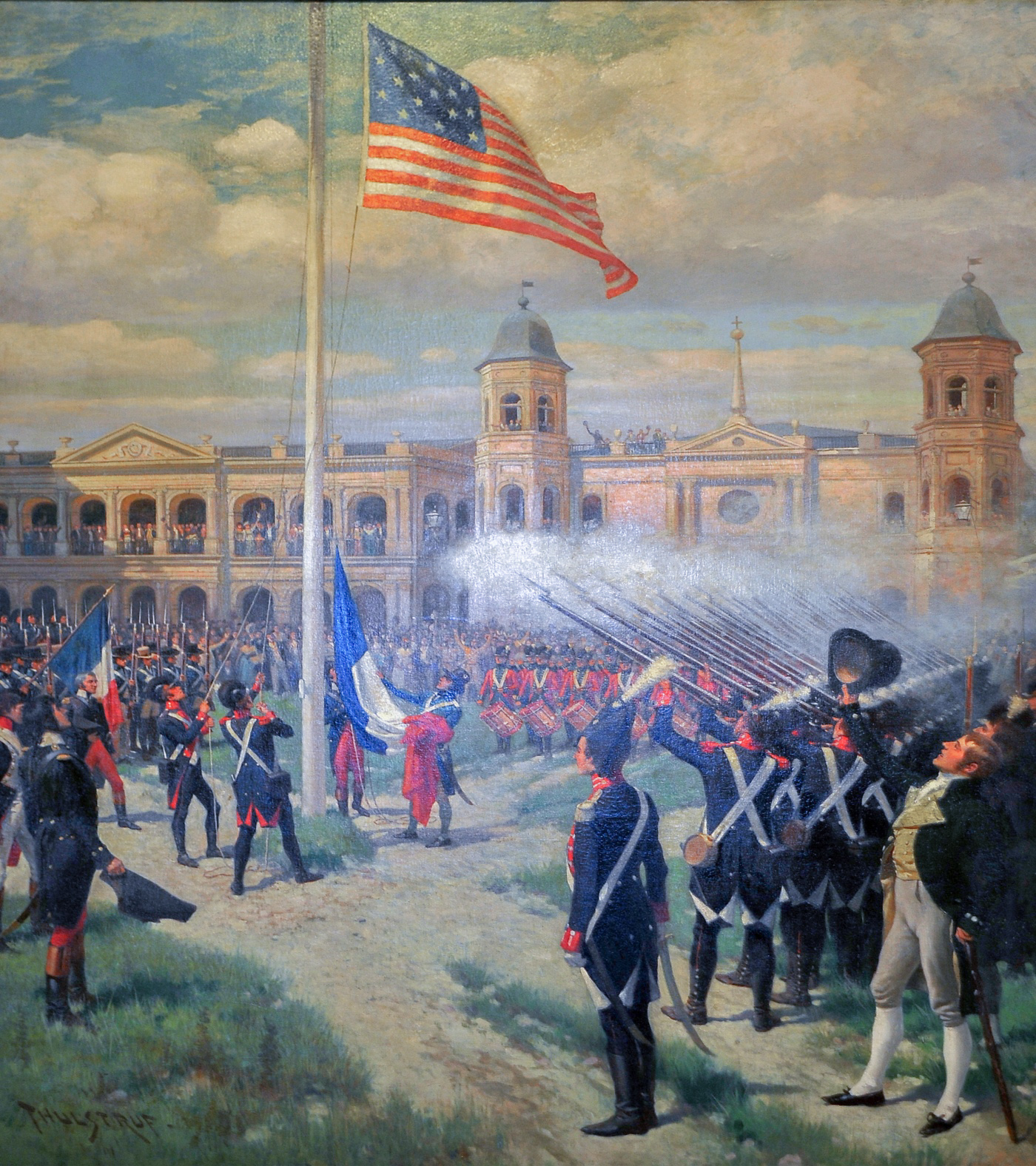
Flag raising in the Place d'Armes (now Jackson Square), New Orleans, marking the transfer of sovereignty over French Louisiana to the United States, December 20, 1803, as depicted by Thure de Thulstrup in 1902

1803: France sells the Louisiana territory to the United States (Louisiana Purchase) in order to fund impending wars. The territory consisted of most of the land in the Mississippi River's drainage basin west of the river.

1804:

- March 21: The Napoleonic Code (a Civil Code) comes into effect. It recognized the principles of civil liberty, equality before the law (but not in the same way for women) and the secular nature of the state. With regard to family, the code established the supremacy of the husband over his wife and children – the status quo in Europe at the time. Women had even fewer rights than children. Divorce by mutual consent was abolished. The Code influenced the law of other countries during and after the Napoleonic Wars.
- May 18: Napoleon is declared emperor by the French Senate. This marked the beginning of the French Empire and the end of the Consulate.
- December 2: Napoleon Bonaparte is consecrated Emperor of the French. The coronation of Napoleon was a sacred ceremony – invented by him – held in the cathedral of Notre Dame de Paris in the presence of Pope Pius VII.

1805: Napoleon's victory at the Battle of Austerlitz cements French dominance in Central Europe. The battle is often cited by military historians as one of Napoleon's tactical masterpieces.

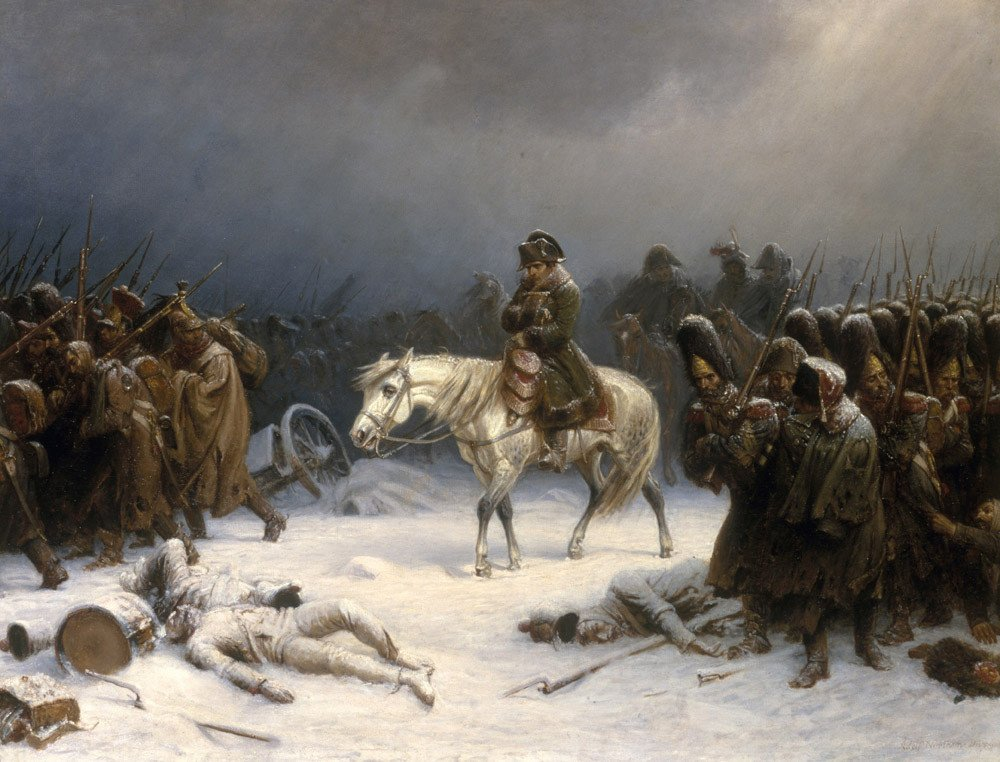
Napoleon's withdrawal from Russia by Adolph Northen

1808: The Baccalauréat is created by Napoleon. It remains the standard French high school exit exam to this day.

1812: The Invasion of Russia (Campagne de Russie): Napoleon's "Grande Armée" is decimated by the Russian winter. The Invasion is among the most devastating military endeavors ever undertaken. In less than six months, it claimed the lives of nearly a million soldiers and civilians.

1814: The Treaty of Fontainebleau is concluded on 11 April 1814 between Napoleon and representatives of Austria, Russia and Prussia. The treaty was signed in Paris on 11 April by the plenipotentiaries of both sides and ratified by Napoleon on 13 April. With this treaty, the allies ended Napoleon's first rule as emperor of the French and sent him into exile on Elba. Louis XVIII returned to Paris as monarch.

1815:

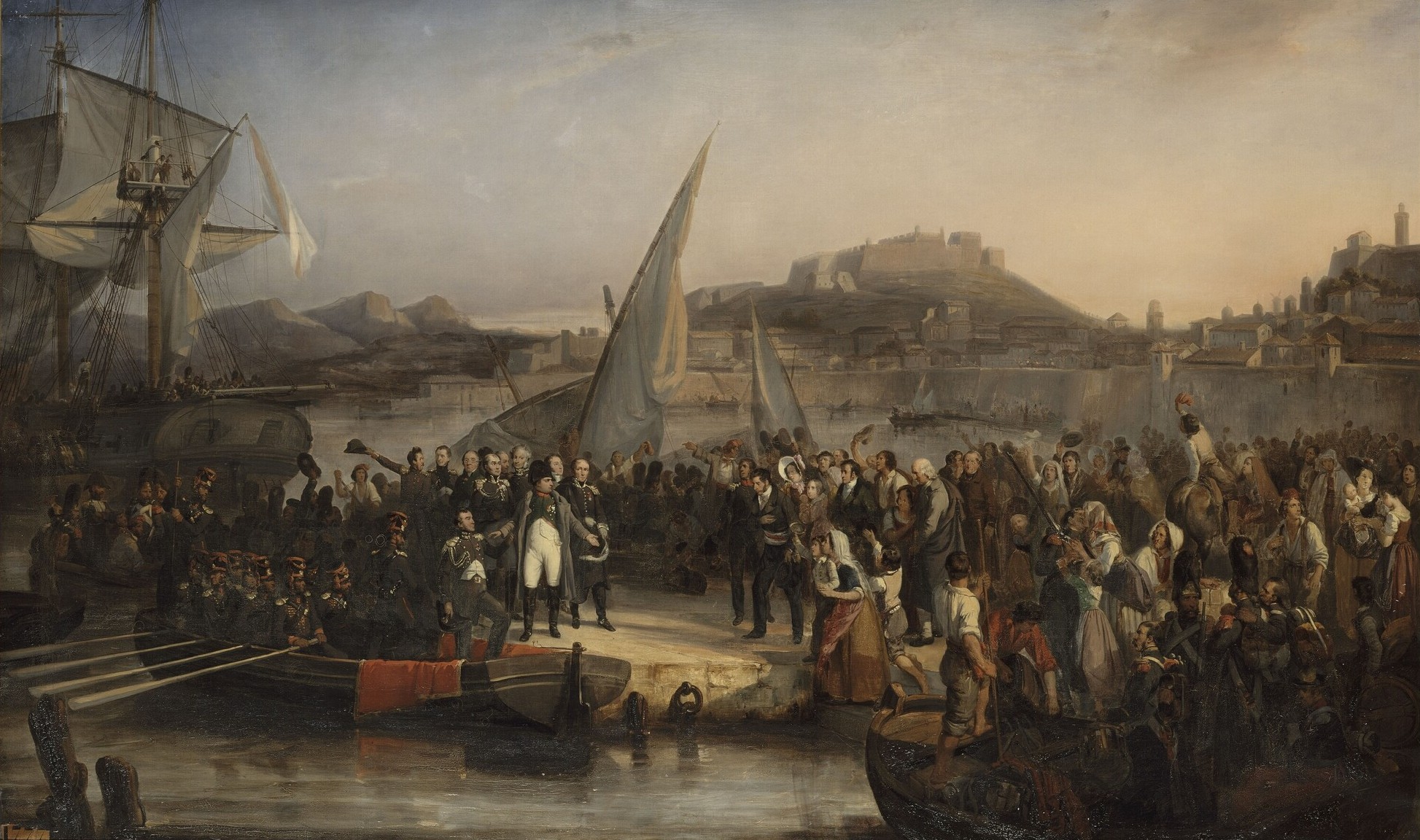
- Napoleon's Departure from Elba by Joseph Beaume, 1836
  March 1: The Hundred Days of Napoleon re-taking power begins as he escapes from Elba and he and his followers land on the French mainland at Golfe-Juan. Marching towards Paris, they pass through the foothills of the Alps, taking a route now known as the Route Napoléon. They encounter little resistance and entered Paris on 20 March. Napoleon then launches his restored, but short-lived rule.
- March 20: With Napoleon at the gates of Paris, Louis XVIII quits the capital with a small escort at midnight, first traveling to Lille, and then crossing the border into the United Kingdom of the Netherlands, halting in Ghent.
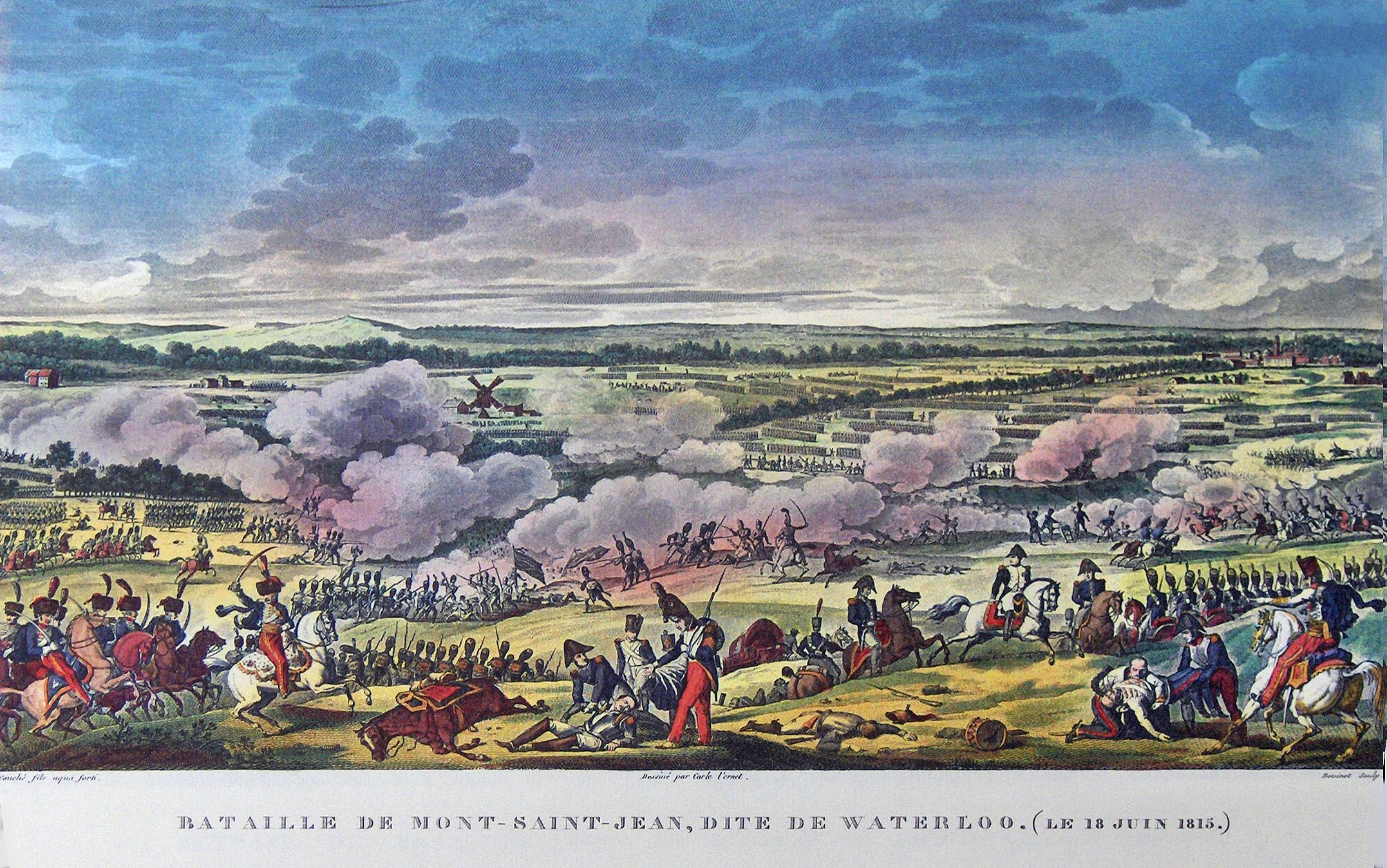
- The Battle of Mont-Saint-Jean, also known as the Battle of Waterloo
  June 18: Napoleon's final defeat at the Battle of Waterloo marked the end of the Napoleonic Wars. The French Imperial Army under the command of Napoleon I was defeated by two armies of the Seventh Coalition. One was a British-led force with units from the United Kingdom, the Netherlands, Hanover, Brunswick, and Nassau. The second army consisted of three corps of the Prussian army under Field Marshal Blucher.
- June 22: Napoleon abdicates for the second time. The British government decides to imprison him and deport him to the island of Saint Helena, situated in the middle of the Atlantic Ocean, with the intention of ensuring that he could no longer "disturb the tranquility of the world."
- Louis XVIII is restored as the king of France after an absence of only a few months.
- The Congress of Vienna is convened as a series of international diplomatic meetings to discuss and agree upon a possible new layout of the European political and constitutional order after the downfall of Napoleon.

== Bourbon Restoration (1815–1830) ==
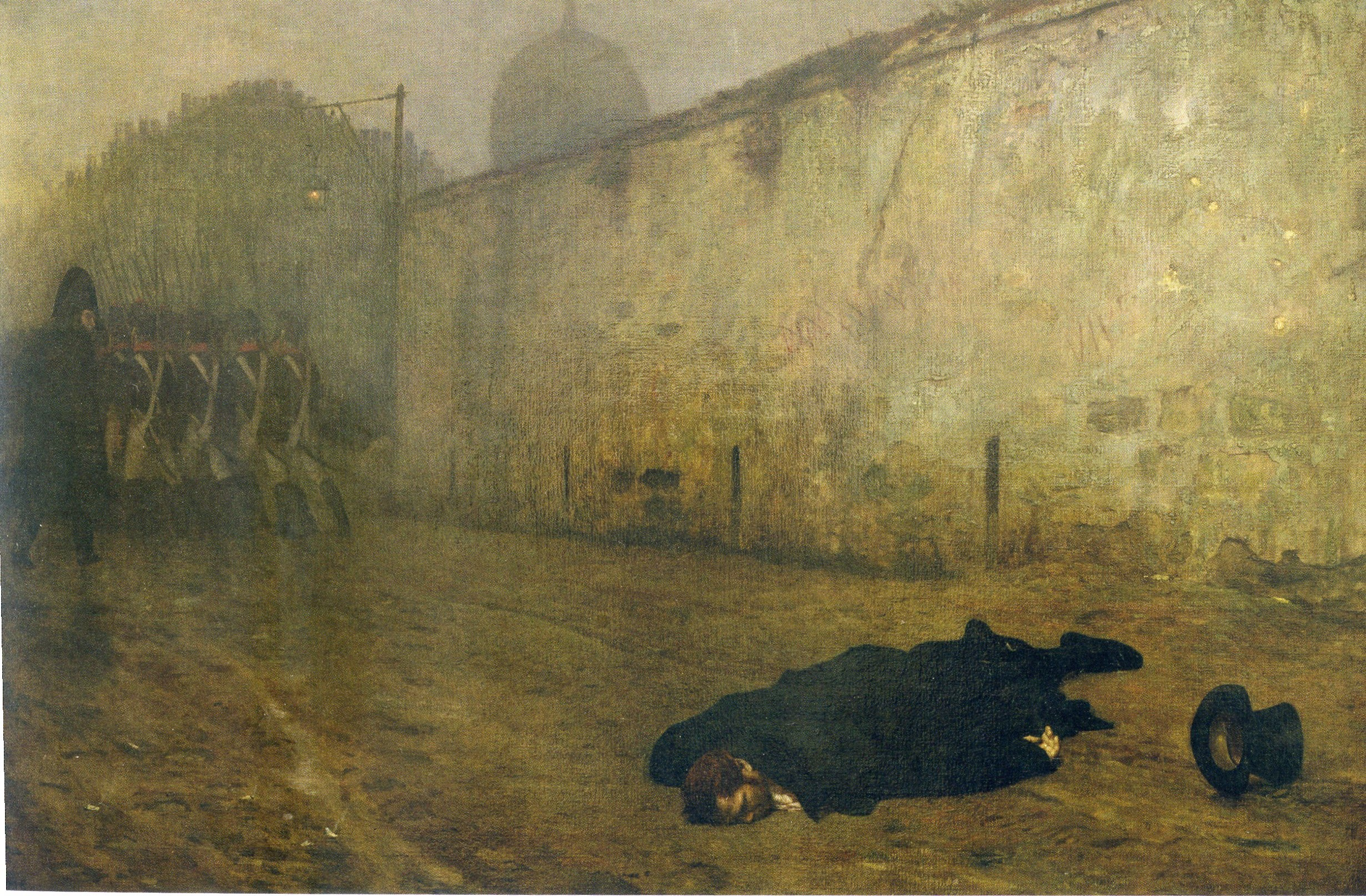
The Execution of Marshal Ney, 1868 painting by Jean-Léon Gérôme. This execution took place in the context of the Second White Terror.

1816–1820: With Louis XVIII as king of France, the "Second White Terror" inflicts reprisals against former revolutionaries and Bonapartists. Several hundred are killed by angry mobs or executed after a quick trial.

1821: Napoleon Bonaparte dies in exile on the island of Saint Helena. In 1815, the British government had selected Saint Helena as the place of exile, following his defeat at Waterloo and subsequent abdication. He was taken to the island in October 1815 and died there on 5 May 1821.

1823: The French invasion of Spain is launched to help the Spanish Bourbon royalists restore King Ferdinand VII of Spain to the absolute power he held prior to the Liberal Triennium (the three years in Spain between 1820 and 1823 when a liberal government ruled following a military uprising in January 1820 against the absolutist rule of Ferdinand VII).

1824: Death of Louis XVIII: His brother, the ultra-royalist Charles X, ascends to the throne. The governments appointed under his reign reimbursed former landowners for the abolition of feudalism at the expense of bondholders, increased the power of the Catholic Church, and reimposed capital punishment for sacrilege.

1827: The first French railway begins operations between Saint-Étienne and Andrézieux (it was horse-drawn initially). The 21 kilometer line carried coal from the Saint Etienne mines to ports on the Loire river.

1830:

- July 5: French forces capture Algiers, marking the beginning of the French conquest of Algeria. This initiated a campaign of conquest that was largely completed by 1847, shortly before Algeria's formal annexation by France.
- July 26: The July Ordinances are issued, suspending freedom of the press and dissolving the Chamber of Deputies. The Ordinances were intended to restore the previous political order, but they angered the citizens of France.
- July 27–29: The July Revolution (Trois Glorieuses) consisted of three days of street fighting, leading to the abdication of Charles X and the end of the Bourbon dynasty.

== July Monarchy (1830–1848) ==
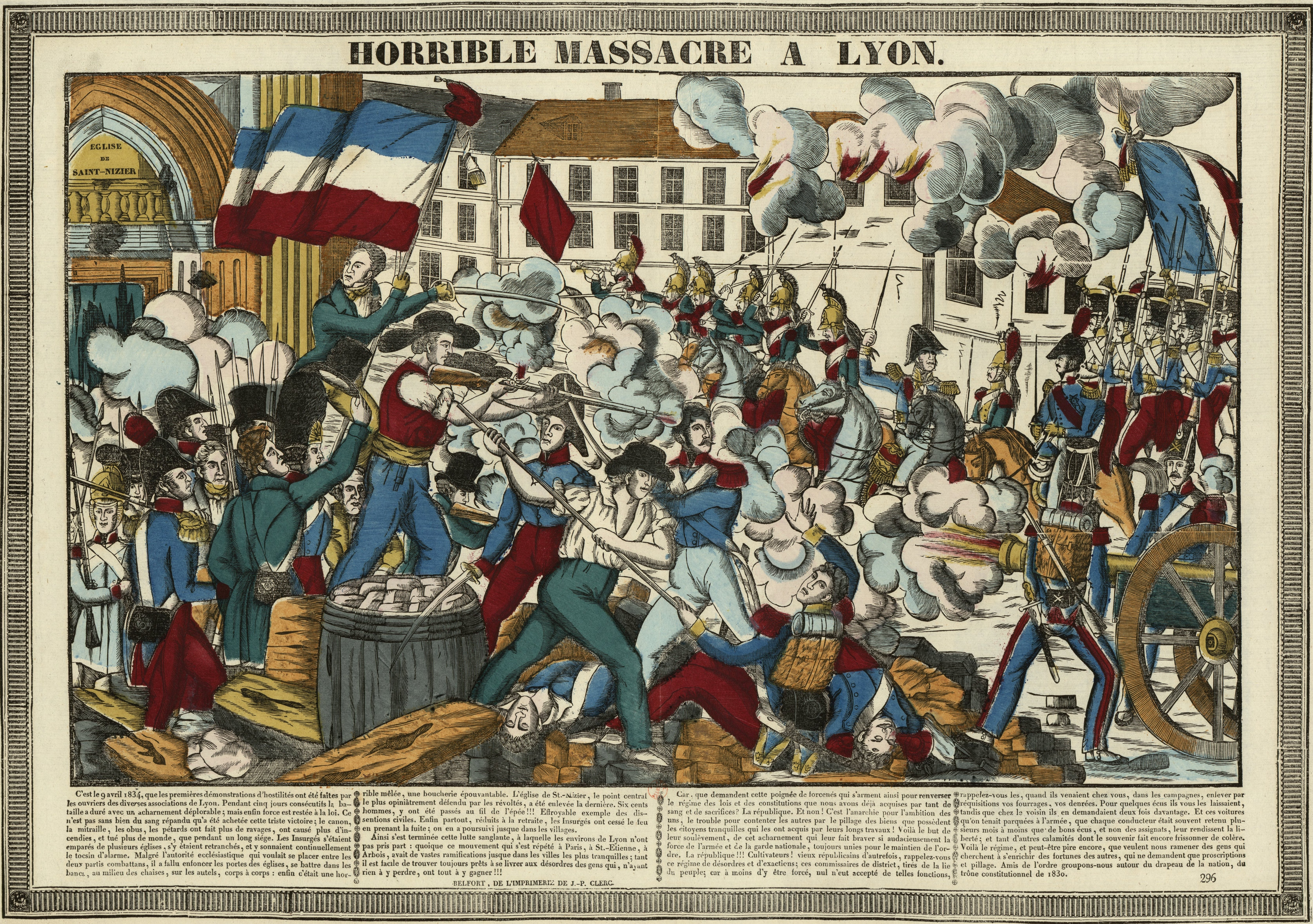
Suppression of the Second Canut revolt in April 1834

1830: Louis-Philippe I is proclaimed "King of the French" (rather than King of France), signaling a shift toward popular sovereignty.

Liberty Leading the People (1830) by Eugène Delacroix, based on the July Revolution

1831: The Canut Revolts is the collective name for the major revolts by Lyonnais silk workers (French: canuts) which first occurred in 1831, and later in 1834 and 1848. They were among the first well-defined worker uprisings of the period known as the Industrial Revolution.

1832: A major Cholera epidemic hits Paris, killing nearly 20,000 people and sparking the June Rebellion (the uprising depicted in Victor Hugo's Les Misérables).

1836: The Arc de Triomphe is inaugurated, 30 years after it was commissioned by Napoleon in order to honor those who fought and died for France during the French Revolutionary and Napoleonic Wars.

1840: The Return of the Ashes (Retour des cendres): Napoleon's remains are brought back from Saint Helena and interred at Les Invalides.

1842: The Railway Law of 1842 is passed, creating a national network with Paris as the "hub" (the étoile system), which still defines French rail today.

1847: The "Banquet Campaign" begins. Since political meetings were illegal, the opposition held large private dinners to organize against Louis-Philippe.

== Second Republic and a coup-d’état (1848–1851) ==
1848:

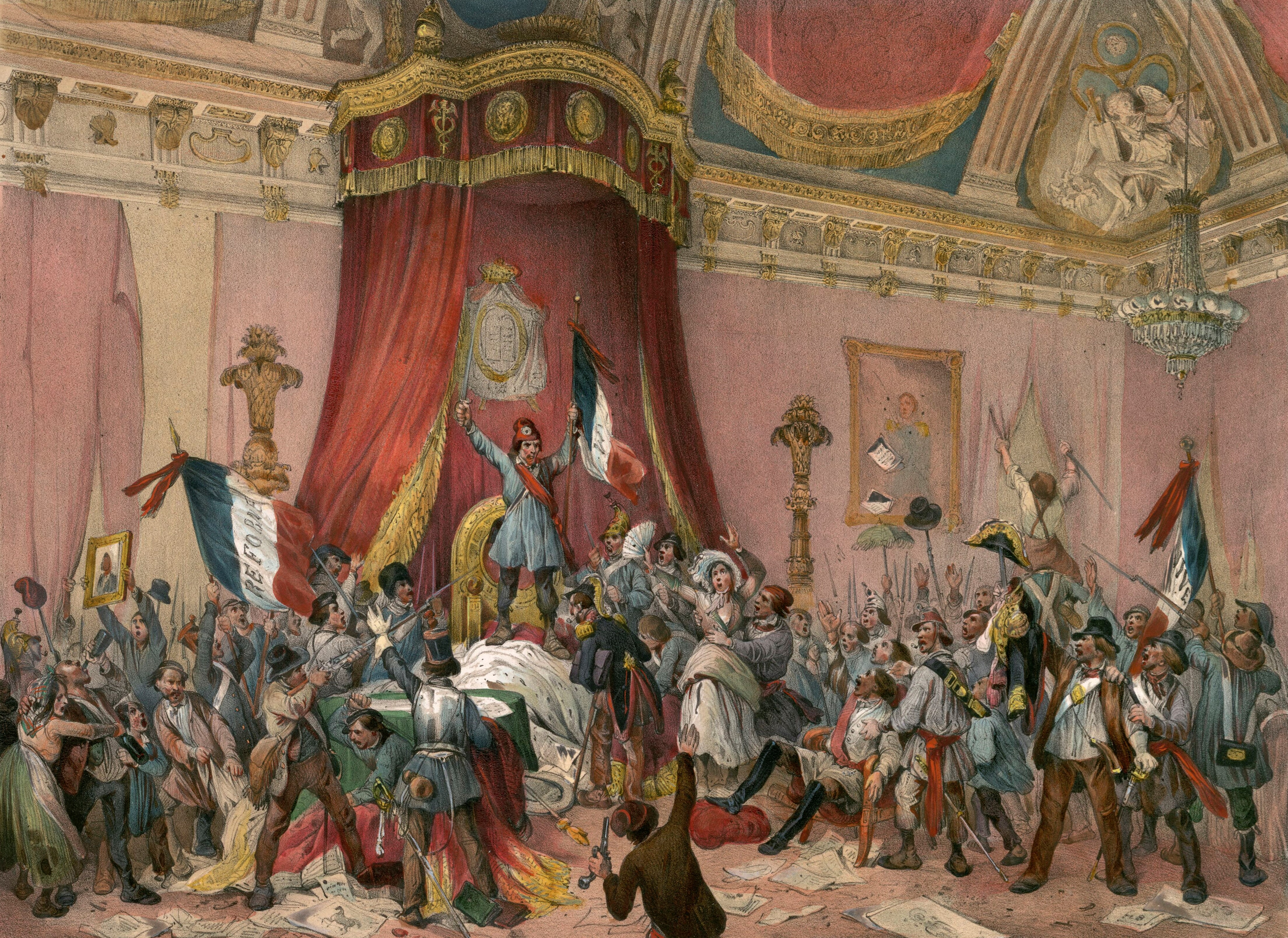
- The throne room of the Tuileries Palace seized by a revolutionary mob
  February Revolution: Louis-Philippe abdicates after a violent uprising. The Second Republic is proclaimed. This sparked a Europe-wide wave of revolutions. Louis-Philippe lived for the remainder of his life in exile in the United Kingdom.
- Abolition of Slavery: France officially abolishes slavery in all its colonies for the second and final time.
- France becomes the first nation to permanently adopt universal male suffrage. This is a form of voting rights in which all adult male citizens are allowed to vote, regardless of income, property, religion, race, or any other qualification.
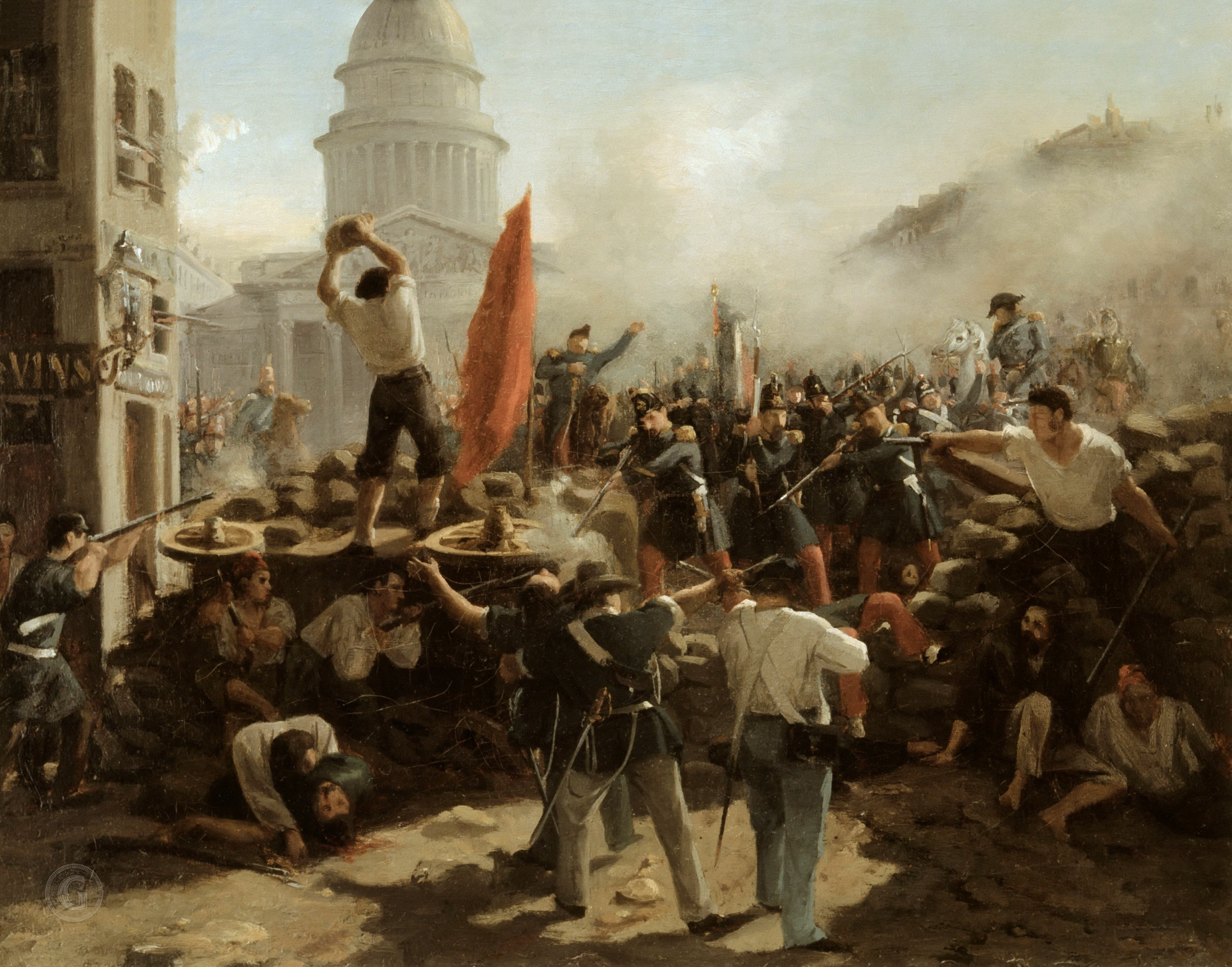
- Painting of a barricade on Rue Soufflot (with the Panthéon behind), Paris, June 1848. By Horace Vernet.
  June Days Uprising was a bloody crackdown on Parisian workers protesting the closure of National Workshops (state-funded jobs). The number of insurgents killed was estimated at between 3,000 and 5,000, in addition to approximately 1,500 who were shot without trial. Several thousand were deported to Algeria.
- December: Louis-Napoleon Bonaparte (nephew of Napoleon I) wins a landslide presidential election. He receives the votes of all segments of the population: the peasants unhappy with rising prices and high taxes; unemployed workers; small businessmen who wanted prosperity and order; and intellectuals such as Victor Hugo. He won the votes of 55.6 percent of all registered voters, and won in all but four of France's departments.

1851: Coup d'état of 2 December: Prevented by the constitution from running for a second term, Louis-Napoleon seizes power and dissolves the National Assembly. This coup d’état was staged by Louis-Napoléon against his own government. The coup dissolved the National Assembly, granted dictatorial powers to the president and preceded the establishment of the Second French Empire a year later.

== Second Empire (1852–1870) ==
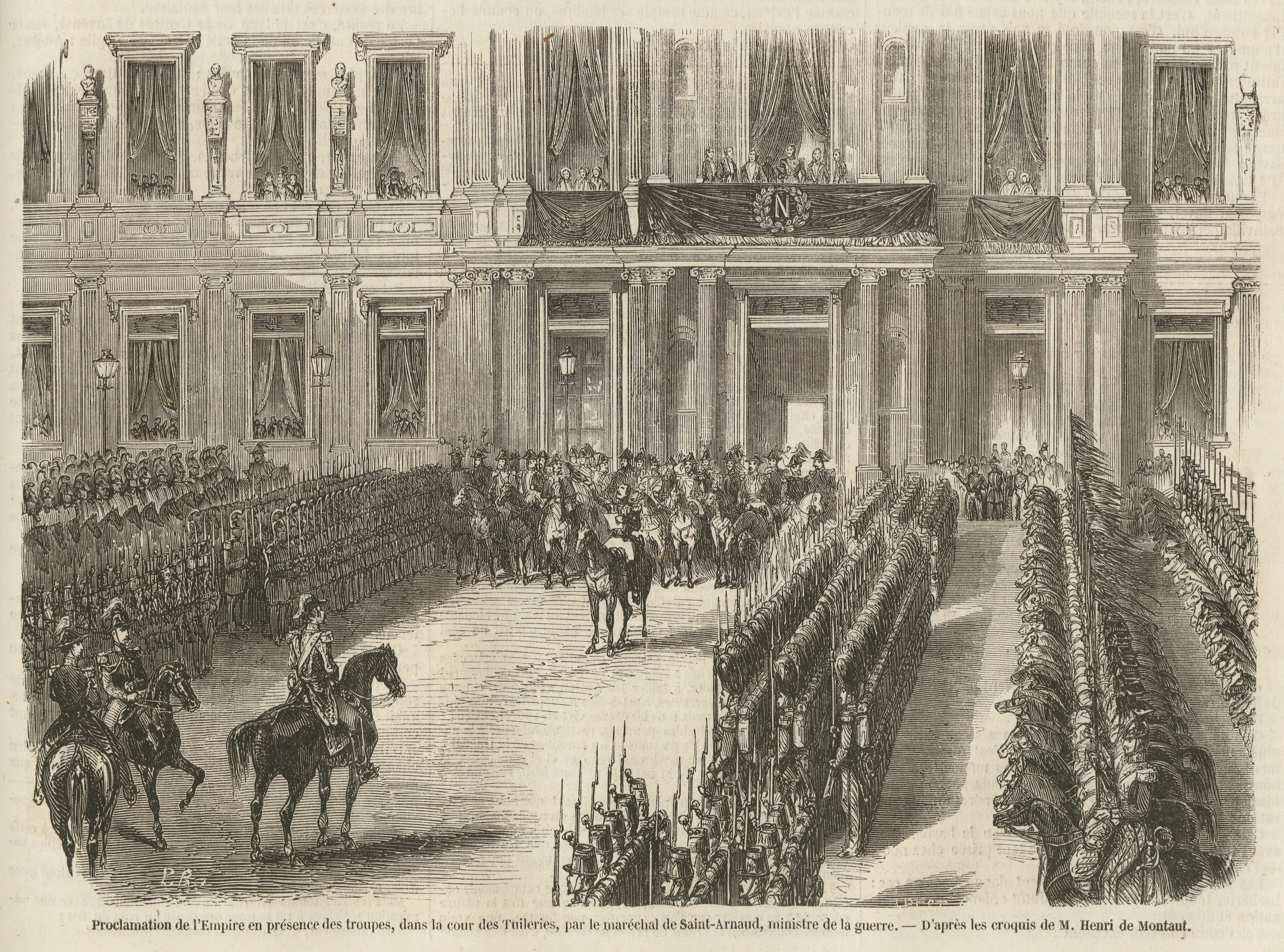
The official declaration of the Second Empire, at the Hôtel de Ville, Paris on December 2, 1852, one year after the coup d’état

1852: Following a national referendum, the Second Republic is abolished and the Second Empire is declared. Louis-Napoleon becomes Emperor Napoleon III.

1853: Napoleon III appoints Baron Haussmann to begin the "Renovation of Paris," during which medieval slums were demolished to create the boulevards and parks seen today. Haussmann's boulevards were planned to facilitate the deployment of troops and artillery, but their main purpose was to help relieve traffic congestion in a dense city and interconnect its landmark buildings. Haussmann’s renovation also added water and sewage infrastructure.

1854–1856: France participates in the Crimean War against Russia, consolidating its return as a major European power. The War's proximate cause was a dispute between France and Russia over the rights of Catholic and Orthodox minorities in Palestine.

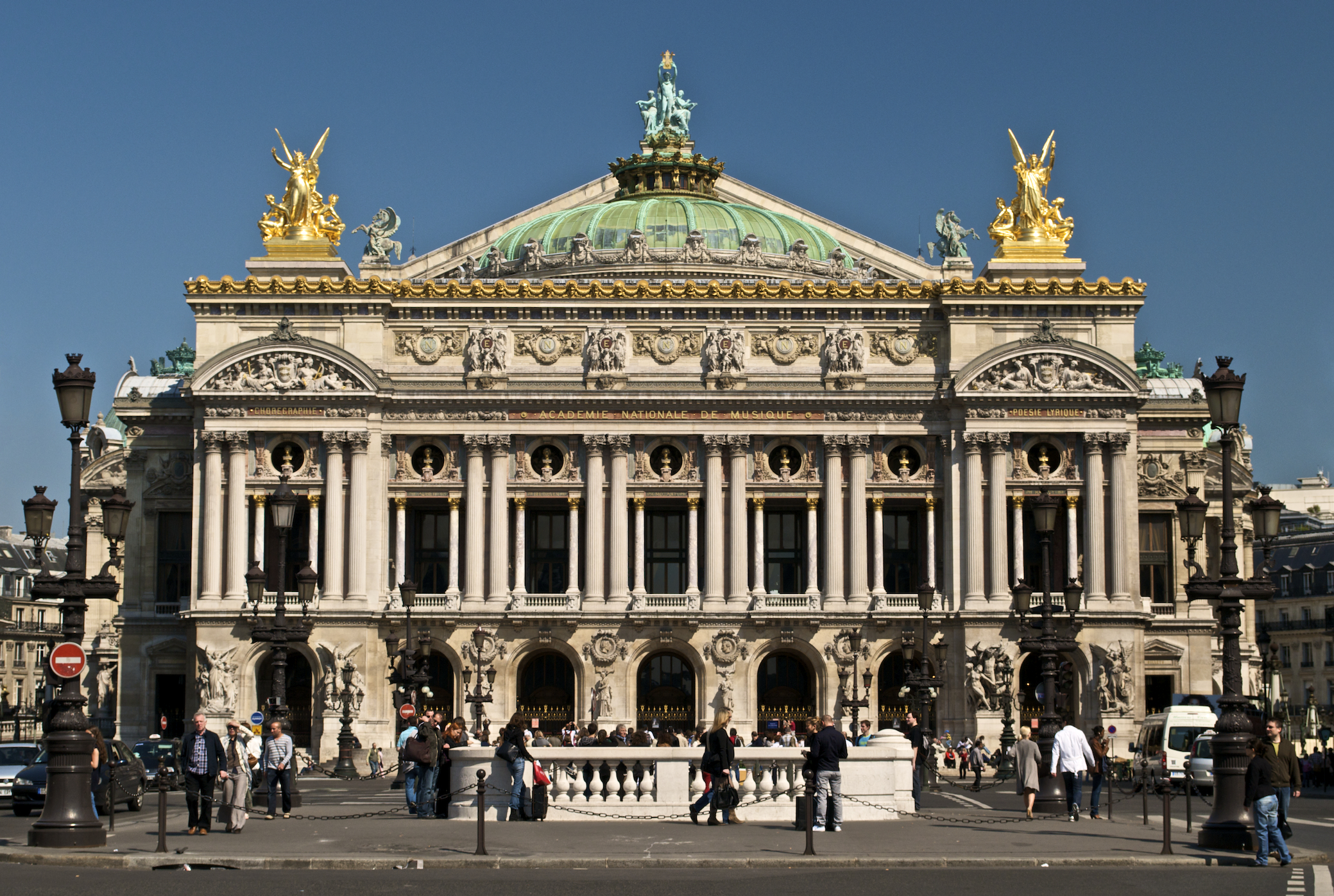
The principal facade of the Palais Garnier

1858: An assassination attempt on Napoleon III leads to the construction of the Palais Garnier (Paris Opera), which was built with a protected area for the arrival of carriages. The assassination attempt was led by Felix Orsini, an Italian revolutionary, who wanted to punish Napoleon III for betraying the Italian republican movement.

1860: The Annexation of Savoy and Nice to France following the Treaty of Turin. The treaty is concluded between France and Piedmont-Sardinia on 24 March and is the instrument by which the Duchy of Savoy and the County of Nice were annexed to France, ending the centuries-old Italian rule of the region.

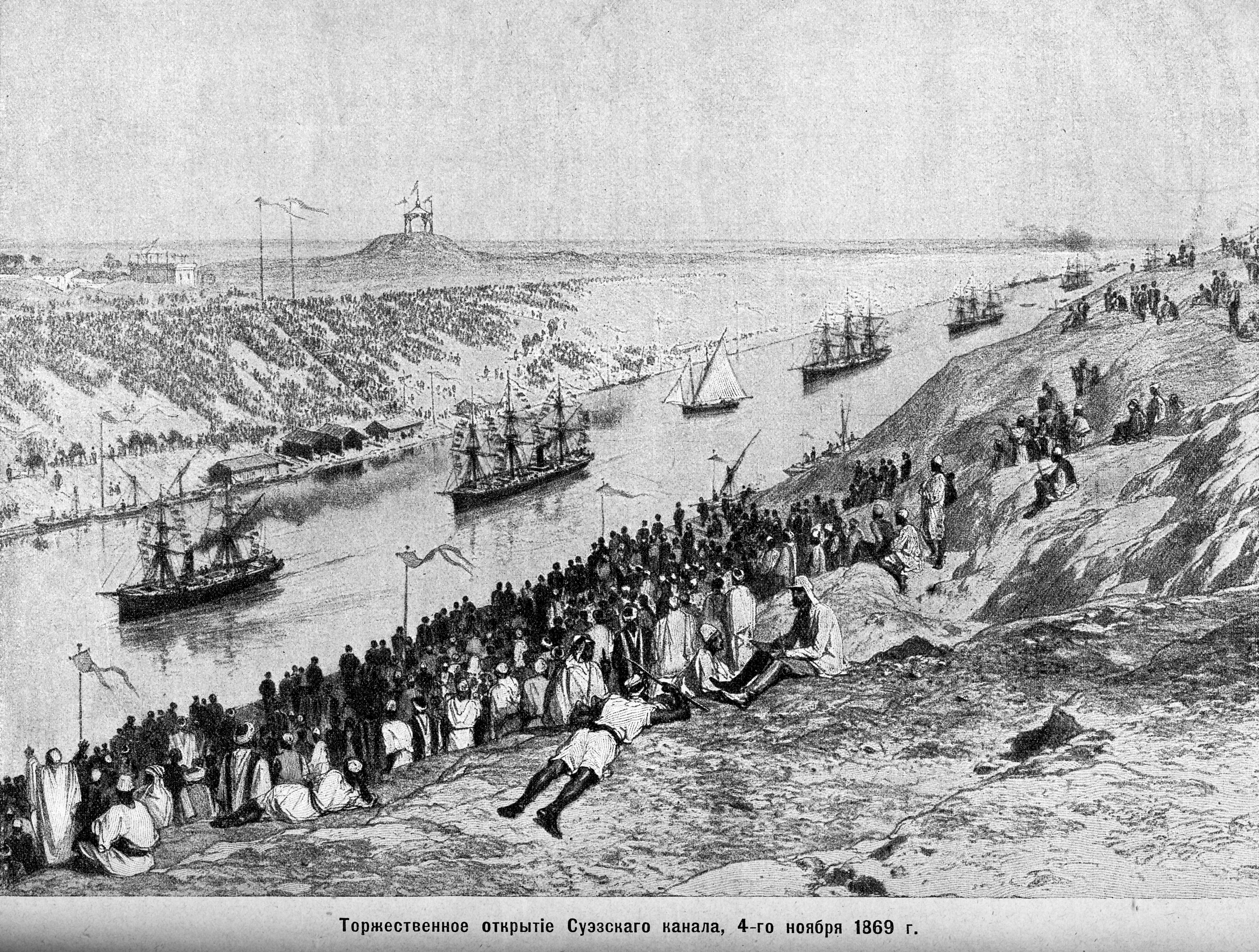
Opening of the Suez Canal, 1869

1869: The Suez Canal, a French-led project directed by Ferdinand de Lesseps, officially opens. Construction of the canal lasted from 1859 to 1869. The canal offers vessels a direct route between the North Atlantic and northern Indian oceans via the Mediterranean Sea and the Red Sea, thereby reducing the journey distance from the Arabian Sea to London by approximately 8,900 kilometres (5,500 mi).

1870: The Franco-Prussian War: France declares war on Prussia. The war lasted only 6 months and resulted in a decisive defeat for France. Napoleon III is captured at the Battle of Sedan (September 2), ending the Second Empire .

== Third Republic and the Belle Époque (1870–1900) ==
1870: On September 4, the Third Republic is proclaimed in Paris after news of the Emperor's capture. It was a parliamentary republic.

1871:

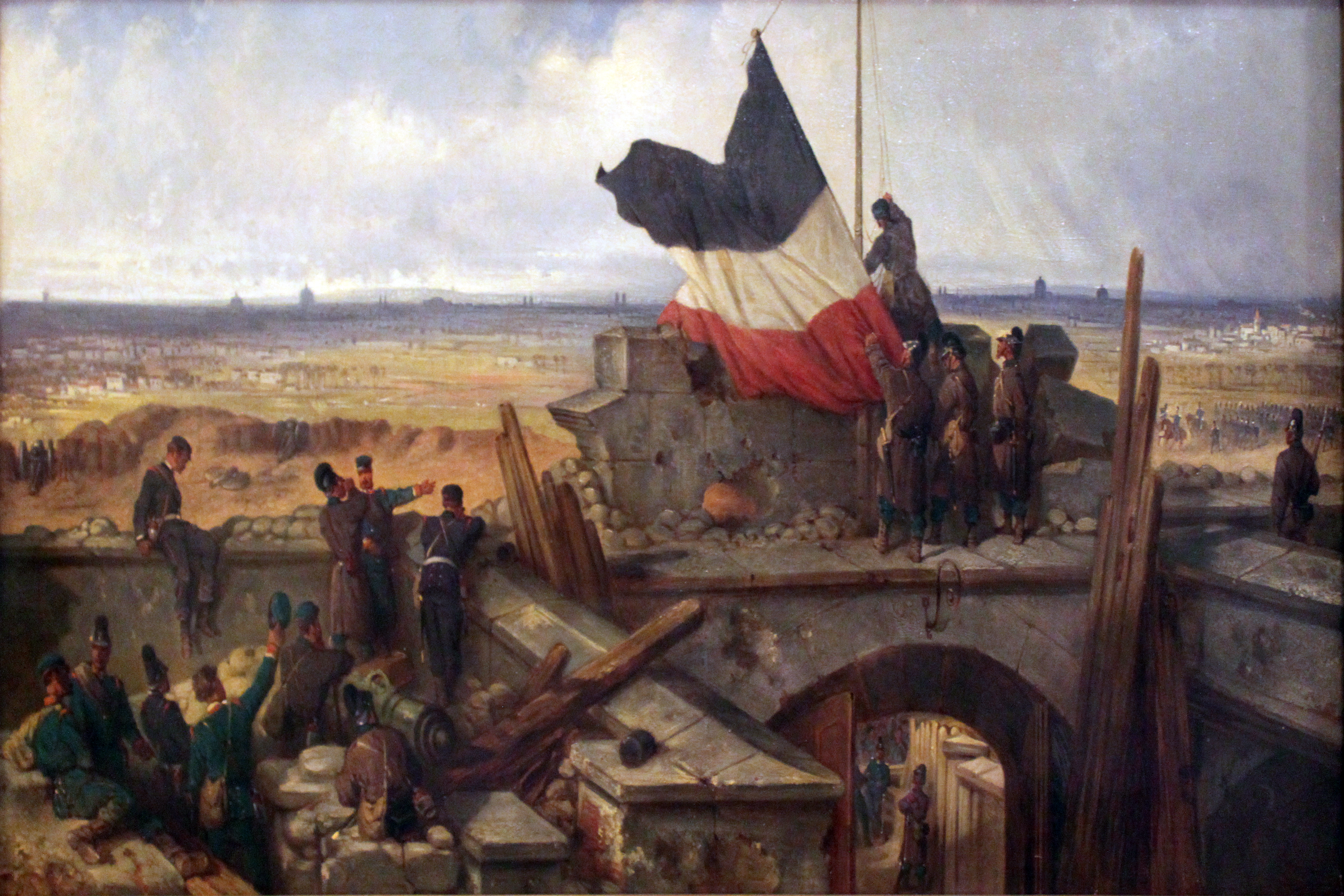
- German soldiers pull down the French flag at Fort Vanves outside Paris in 1871.
  The Siege of Paris (September 1870 - January 1871): Prussian forces surround the city, leading to a famine. By January, 3,000–4,000 people were dying per week from the effects of cold and hunger. There were sharp rises in cases of smallpox, typhoid, and especially pneumonia. The Prussians succeeded in taking the city.
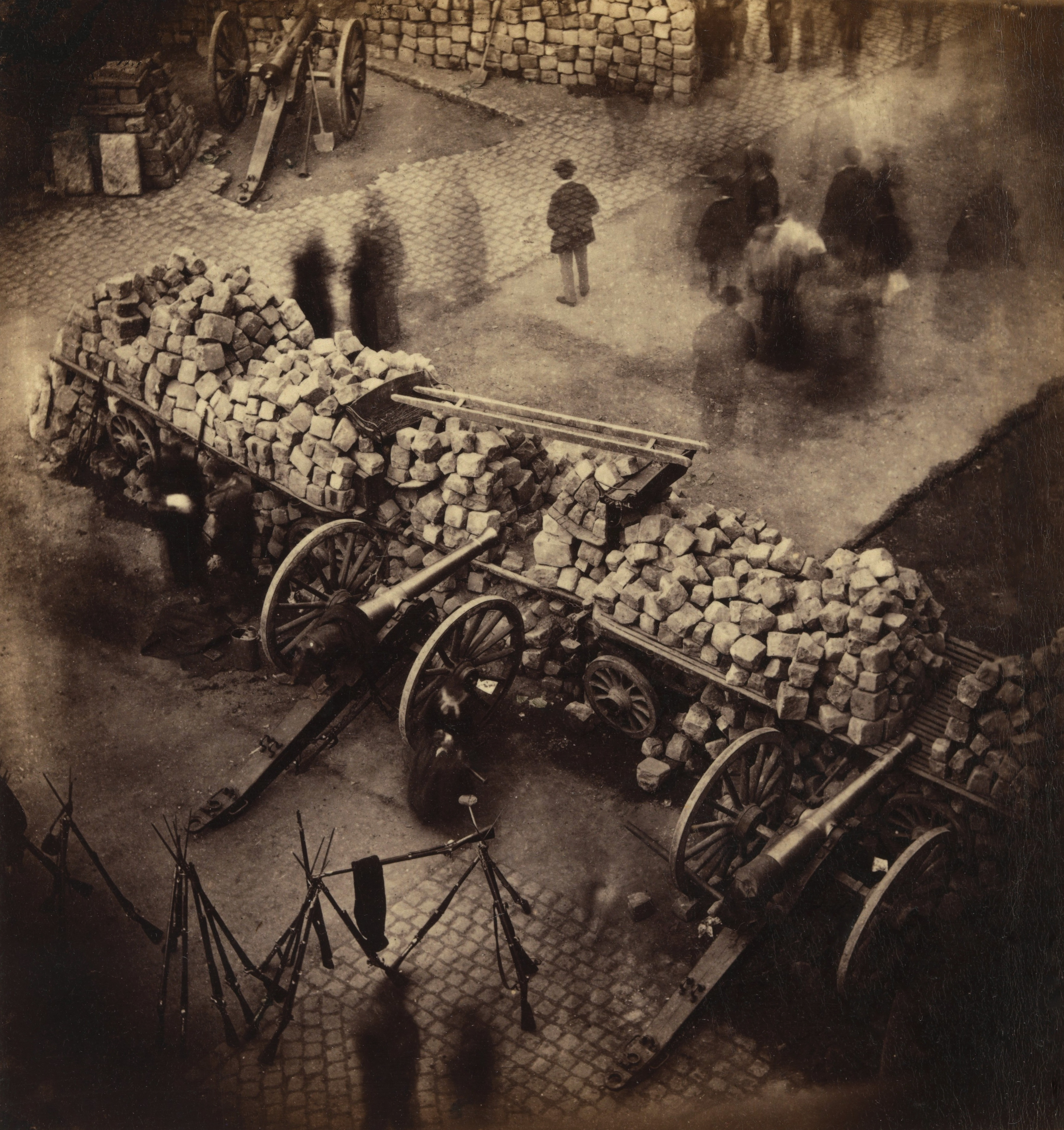
- A barricade constructed by the French Commune in April 1871 on the Rue de Rivoli near the Hotel de Ville. The figures are blurred due to the camera's lengthy exposure time, an effect commonly seen in early photographs.
  The Paris Commune: A radical socialist government rules Paris for two months before being suppressed during the "Bloody Week" (Semaine sanglante).
- Treaty of Frankfurt signed on May 10: France loses Alsace-Lorraine to the new German Empire. The treaty formalizes the French defeat and provides for the cession of Alsace-Lorraine, which becomes a territory of the German Reich, as well as the payment of a war indemnity of five billion gold francs guaranteed by the occupation of part of the territory.

1874: The first Impressionist art exhibition is held in Paris on April 15. Cezanne, Degas, Monet, Morisot, Pisarro, Renoir and Sisley were among the 31 participating artists who organized the exhibition, outside official channels.

1875: The constitutional laws of 1875 are passed, finalizing the legal structure of the Third Republic.

1881–1882: The Jules Ferry laws establish free, mandatory, and secular education for all children. The dual system of state and church schools that were largely staffed by religious officials was replaced by state schools and lay school teachers.

1889: The Exposition Universelle celebrates the centenary of the French Revolution; the Eiffel Tower is inaugurated as its temporary centerpiece. It was the fifth of ten major expositions held in the city between 1855 and 1937. It attracted more than 32 million visitors.

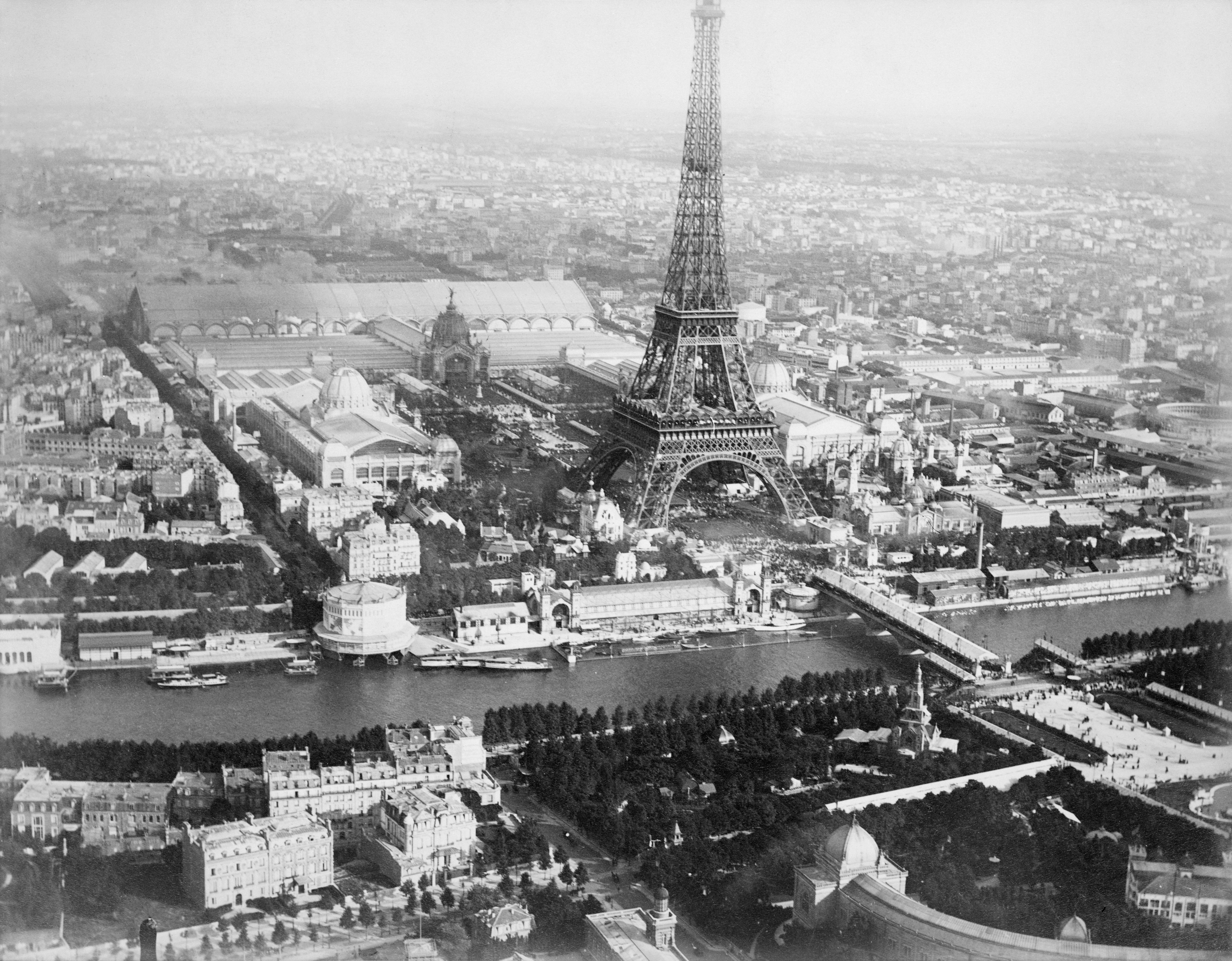
Aerial view of the Exposition Universelle, as seen from a ballon (1889)

1894: The Dreyfus Affair begins when Jewish artillery officer Alfred Dreyfus is wrongly convicted of treason, sparking a decade of political crisis and civil rights debate. The affair was a major political scandal that convulsed France from 1894 until its resolution in 1906, and then had reverberations for decades more.

1895: The Lumière Brothers hold the first commercial film screening on 28 December in Paris, thereby giving rise to the birth of cinema.

1900: Paris hosts the Olympic Games and the Exposition Universelle, featuring line 1 of the Paris Métro. The responsibility for organizing the Olympic Games was assigned to the organizers of the Exposition, who knew little about sports.

== See also ==
- Timeline of French history
