= Garcihernández =

- Municipality
- Location in Salamanca
- Coordinates: 40°51′37″N 5°25′57″W
- Country: Spain
- Autonomous community: Castile and León
- Province: Salamanca
- Comarca: Tierra de Alba

Government
  - Mayor: Ángel Moro Pérez (People's Party)

Area
  - Total: 48 km^{2} (19 sq mi)
- Elevation: 814 m (2,671 ft)

Population (2025-01-01)
  - Total: 412
  - Density: 8.6/km^{2} (22/sq mi)
- Time zone: UTC+1 (CET)
  - Summer (DST): UTC+2 (CEST)
- Postal code: 37810

Garcihernández is a village and municipality in the province of Salamanca, western Spain, part of the autonomous community of Castile-Leon. It is located 30 kilometres (19 mi) from the provincial capital city of Salamanca and has a population of 590 people.

It was the location of the Battle of García Hernández in 1812, during the Peninsular War.

== Geography ==
The municipality covers an area of 48 km^{2} (19 sq mi). It lies 814 metres (2,671 ft) above sea level and the post code is 37810.

== Economy ==
The basis of the economy is agriculture. Garcihernández has resisted the large-scale abandonment of most of the villages of the Alba de Tormes area due to urban developments in the 1990s in Spain. Many people from Garcihernández worked in masonry in the capital, or elsewhere, in these years and stayed living in their own village. So the emigration stopped.

== See also ==
- List of municipalities in Salamanca
