= Fuzzy-Wuzzy =

1892 poem by Rudyard Kipling

"Fuzzy-Wuzzy" is a poem by the English author and poet Rudyard Kipling, published in 1892 as part of Barrack Room Ballads. It describes the respect of Othman Digna, the "prince of the east" for his bravery when he fought the British army in Sudan.

== Background ==
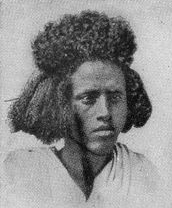
A Beja nomad

"Fuzzy-Wuzzy" was the term used by British soldiers for Beja warriors who were supporting the Mahdi of Sudan in the Mahdist War.

The Beja people were one of several broad multi-tribal groupings supporting the Mahdi, and were divided into five tribes: Halanga, Amarar, Beni-Amer, Habab, and Bishariyyin. All of these are semi-nomadic and inhabit the Sudan's Red Sea Hills, Libyan Desert, and southern Egypt. The Beja provided a large number of warriors to the Mahdist forces. They were armed with swords and spears and some of them carried breech-loaded rifles which had been captured from the Egyptian forces, and some of them had acquired military experience in the Egyptian army.

=== Legacy ===
The term "Fuzzy Wuzzy Angels" was used by Australian soldiers during World War II to describe Papua New Guinean stretcher bearers. The term was seen as merely descriptive when used by Kipling and by British soldiers during the Sudan Campaign and by Australian soldiers in the 20th century; however, more recently some have deemed it a racial slur.

== The poem ==
Kipling's poem "Fuzzy-Wuzzy" praises them for their martial prowess, because "for all the odds agin' you, Fuzzy-Wuz, you broke the square". This could refer to either or both historical battles between the British and Mahdist forces where British infantry squares were "broken". The first was at the Battle of Tamai, on 13 March 1884, and the second was on 17 January 1885 during the Battle of Abu Klea (when the square was badly broken, though thereafter promptly reformed). Kipling's narrator, an infantry soldier, speaks in admiring terms of the "Fuzzy-wuzzys", praising their bravery which, although insufficient to defeat the British, did at least enable them to boast of having "broken the square"—an achievement which few other British foes could claim.

Writing in The Atlantic in June 2002, Christopher Hitchens noted "[Yet] where Kipling excelled—and where he most deserves praise and respect—was in enjoining the British to avoid the very hubris that he had helped to inspire in them. His 'Recessional' is only the best-known and most hauntingly written of many such second thoughts. ... There is also 'The Lesson', a poem designed to rub in the experience of defeat in Africa, 'Fuzzy-Wuzzy', a tribute to the fighting qualities of the Sudanese."

Benjamin Britten adapted the poem for his song of the same name between 1922 and 1923, and it was further revised in 1968. It remains unpublished.

== Other references ==
T. S. Eliot included the poem in his 1941 collection A Choice of Kipling's Verse.

== See also ==
- 1892 in poetry
- 1892 in literature
