= Pleubian =

Pleubian Pleuvihan
- Commune
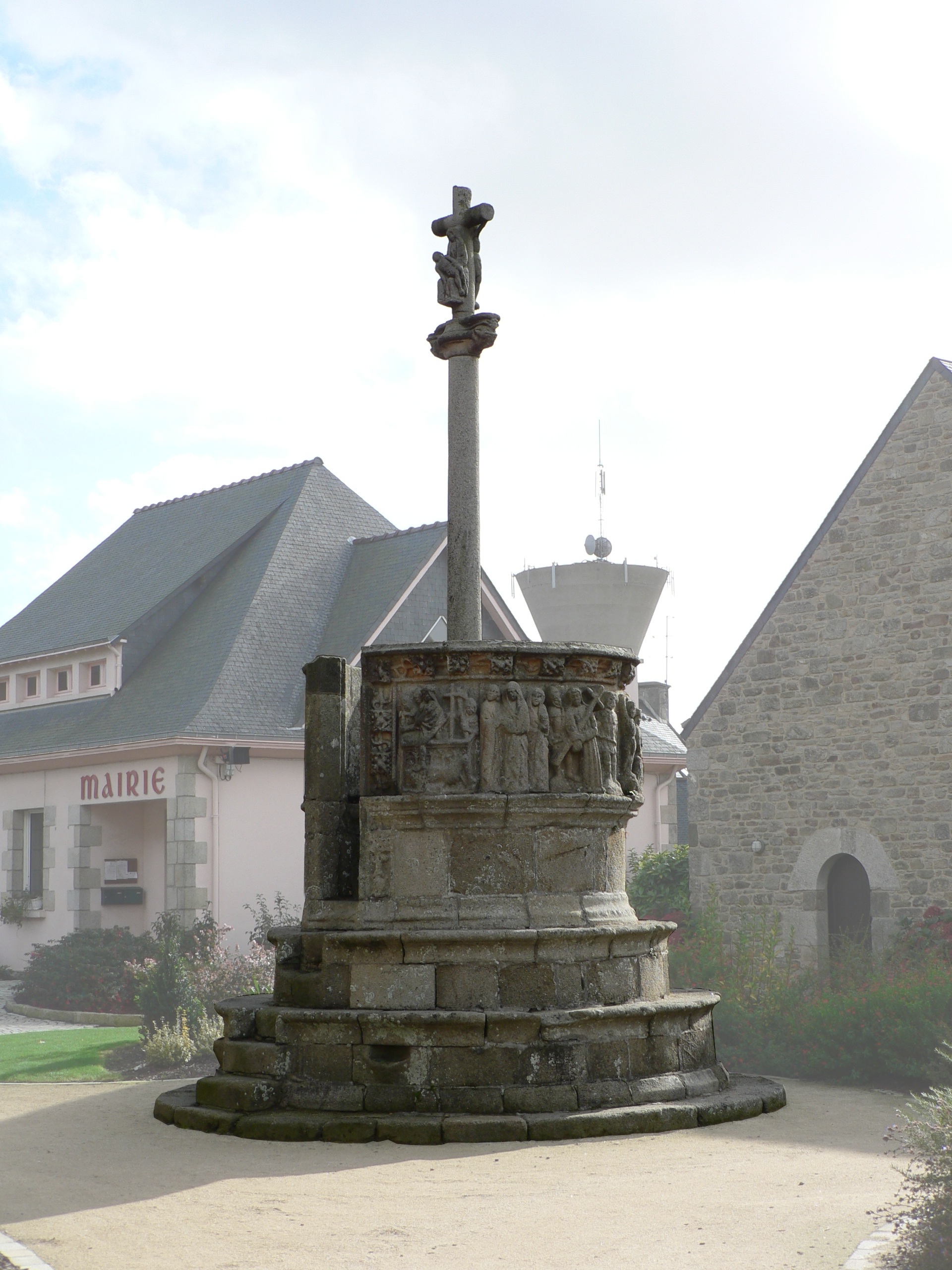
- St Georges Church, external pulpit
- Location of Pleubian
- Location within France Location within Brittany
- Coordinates: 48°50′33″N 3°08′19″W
- Country: France
- Region: Brittany
- Department: Côtes-d'Armor
- Arrondissement: Lannion
- Canton: Tréguier
- Intercommunality: Lannion-Trégor Communauté

Government
  - Mayor (2020–2026): Loïc Mahé
- Area^{1}: 20.10 km^{2} (7.76 sq mi)
- Highest elevation: 59 m (194 ft)
- Lowest elevation: 0 m (0 ft)
- Population (2023): 2,365
  - Density: 117.7/km^{2} (304.7/sq mi)
- Time zone: UTC+01:00 (CET)
  - Summer (DST): UTC+02:00 (CEST)
- INSEE/Postal code: 22195 /22610
- ^{1} French Land Register data, which excludes lakes, ponds, glaciers > 1 km^{2} (0.386 sq mi or 247 acres) and river estuaries.

Pleubian (French pronunciation: [pløbjɑ̃]; Breton: Pleuvihan) is a commune in the Côtes-d'Armor department of Brittany in northwestern France.

== Population ==
People from Pleubian are called pleubiannais in French.

Historical population
Year	Pop.	±% p.a.
1968	3,533	—
1975	3,401	−0.54%
1982	3,293	−0.46%
1990	2,963	−1.31%
1999	2,691	−1.06%
2007	2,508	−0.88%
2012	2,453	−0.44%
2017	2,322	−1.09%
2023	2,365	+0.31%
Source: INSEE

== See also ==
- Communes of the Côtes-d'Armor department
