= Battle of García Hernández =

1812 battle of the Peninsular War

- Part of the Peninsular War
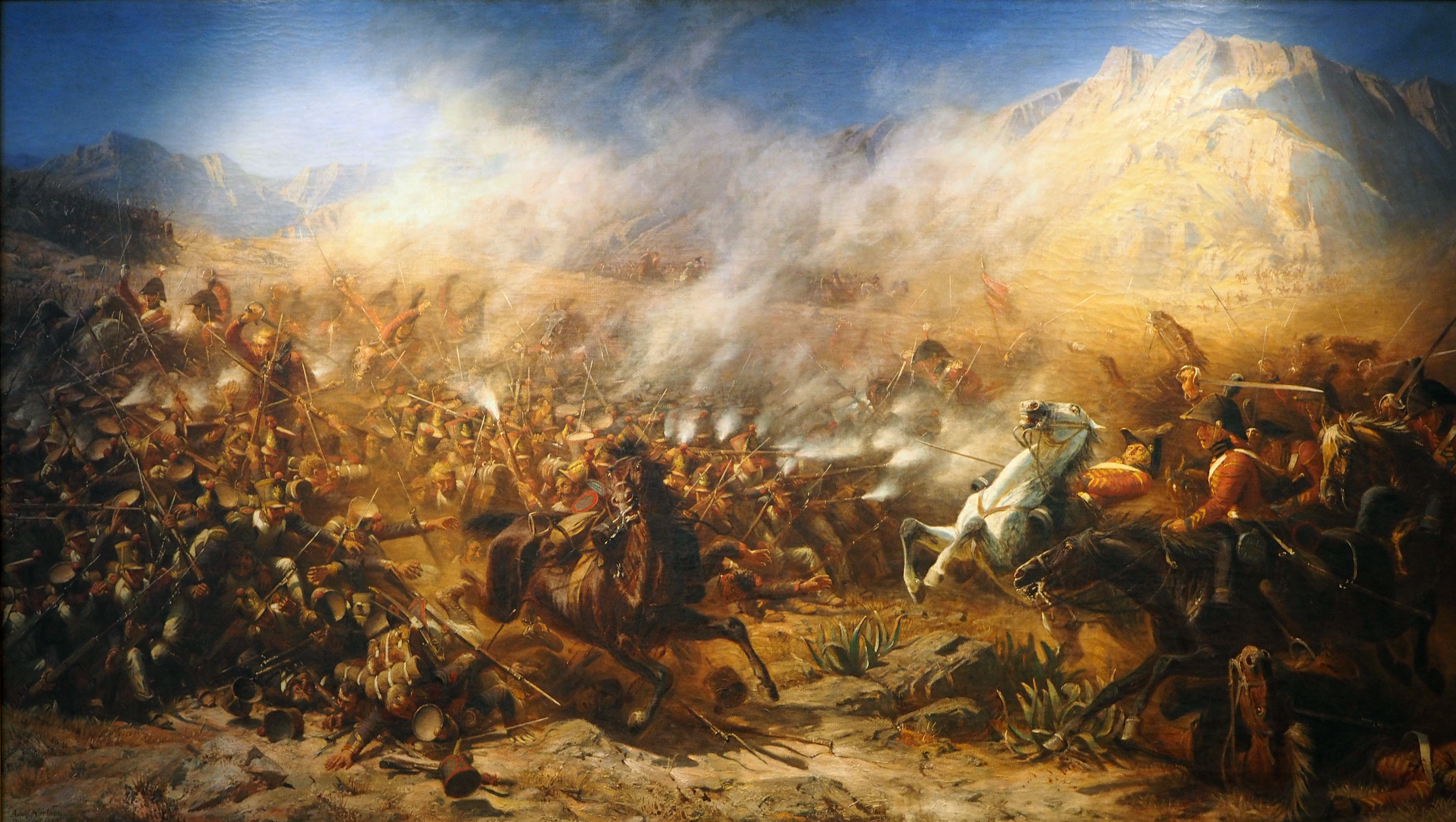
- Painting of the battle by Adolf Northen
Date	23 July 1812
Location	Garcihernández, Spain 40°51′37″N 5°25′57″W
Result	British victory

Belligerents
United Kingdom	France

Commanders and leaders
Eberhardt von Bock	Maximilien Sébastien Foy

Strength
1,770	4,000

Casualties and losses
52 killed 69 wounded 6 missing	1,100–1,600 killed, wounded or captured

Peninsular War
Castile 1811–13
current battle

The Battle of García Hernández was fought on 23 July 1812 during the Peninsular War. In the battle, two cavalry brigades of the British Army's King's German Legion (KGL) under Major-General Eberhardt Otto George von Bock defeated 4,000 French troops led by General Maximilien Sébastien Foy. In what would otherwise have been an unremarkable skirmish, the KGL dragoons achieved the unusual feat of breaking two French squares, those of the 6th, 69th and 76th Line, routing the entire French force with heavy losses.

== Background ==
The previous day, the Anglo-Portuguese Army commanded by Arthur Wellesley, 1st Duke of Wellington had won a decisive victory over a French army led by Marshal Auguste Marmont in the Battle of Salamanca. Maximilien Sébastien Foy's division was the only French unit not engaged in the battle, and it was acting as rearguard on 23 July.

== Battle ==
Bock's 770-strong heavy cavalry brigade, consisting of the 1st and 2nd King's German Legion (KGL) Dragoons, led the pursuit of the French. Supporting Bock were the 1,000 troopers of George Anson's British light cavalry brigade (11th and 16th Light Dragoons). As the KGL troops approached, Maj-Gen Curto's French cavalry fled. Foy arranged his eight battalions on a hill in a square near Garcihernández in Salamanca province in Spain. He had two battalions each of the 6th Light, and the 39th, 69th and 76th Line Infantry Regiments.

Bock's dragoons charged a square belonging to a battalion of the 6th Light. The French held their fire too long. Their volley killed a number of horsemen, but a mortally wounded horse carrying a dead dragoon crashed into the square like a battering ram. The horse fell, kicking wildly, knocking down at least six men and creating a gap in the square. Captain Gleichen rode his horse into the gap, followed by his troopers. The square broke up and most of the men surrendered.

A second square farther up the hillside was soon charged. Shaken by the first square's disaster, the men flinched when the dragoons rode into them. Soon the men in the second square were running for their lives, except those who surrendered. Foy quickly pulled back the rest of his troops. Anson's horsemen mopped up the battlefield.

== Results ==
Foy lost 200 killed and wounded, and 1,400 captured. Bock lost 54 killed and 62 wounded. The very high proportion of killed to wounded was due to the "deadly effect of musketry at the closest possible quarters." Another authority gives 52 KGL soldiers killed, 69 wounded and 6 missing and 1,100 total French casualties.

== Commentary ==
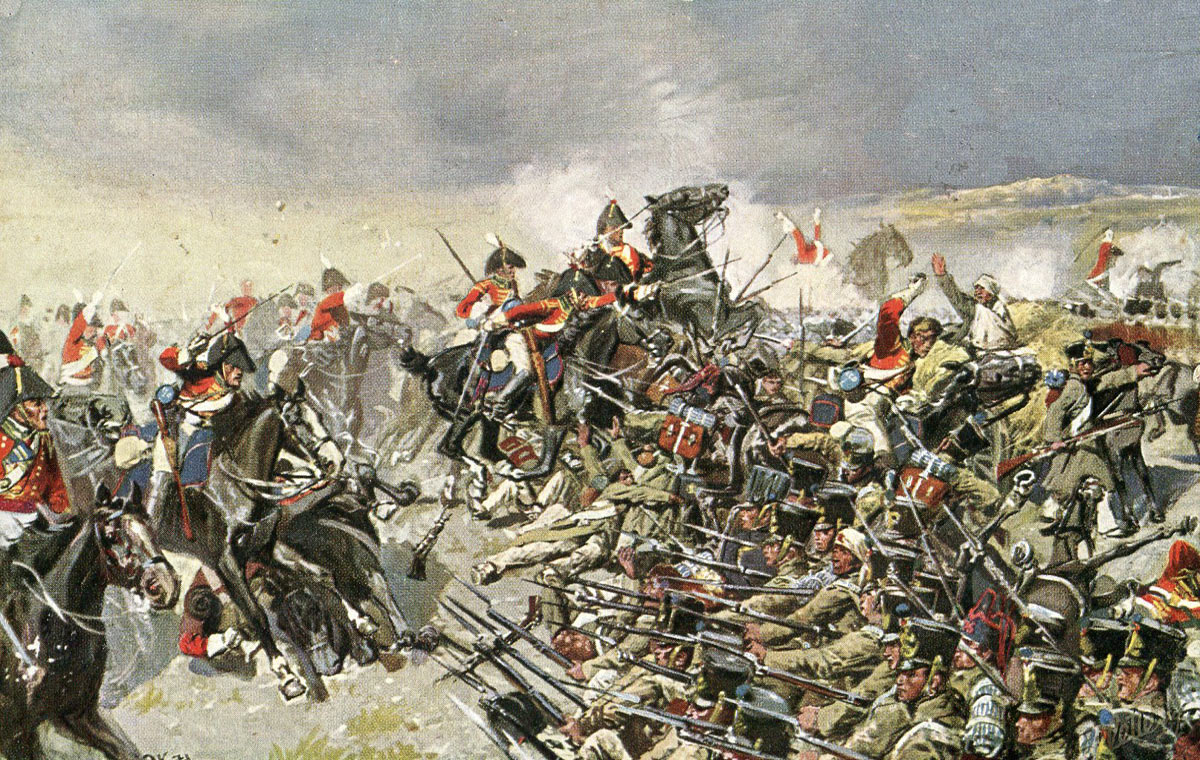
Charge of the KGL heavy dragoons

The breaking of a steady square was a rare event. A French infantry battalion in square formed up in a bayonet-studded hedgehog, either 3-ranks or 6-ranks deep. (A British square was 4-deep.) If a square stood its ground without flinching and fired with effect, it could withstand the best cavalry. When infantry squares were broken by cavalry in the Napoleonic Wars, it was usually because:

- the infantry were of poor quality
- the infantry were tired, disorganized or discouraged
- it was raining, making it difficult for the infantry to fire effectively, and wetting their gunpowder
- the infantry fired a poorly aimed volley
- the infantry waited too long to fire

At García Hernández, the last event occurred with the first square, leading to the extraordinary accident of a mortally wounded horse and rider smashing into the square, making a gap which was then exploited by the following cavalry. The second square likely panicked at seeing the first square being torn apart.

== Culture ==
This skirmish is depicted in Bernard Cornwell's novel, Sharpe's Sword.

The battle was also shown in Susanna Clarke's Jonathan Strange and Mr. Norrell, while Jonathan Strange is serving under the Duke of Wellington.

== Notes ==
Preceded by Battle of Salamanca	Napoleonic Wars; Battle of García Hernández	Succeeded by Battle of Saltanovka
