= Adolph Northen =

German painter (1828–1876)

Adolph Northen (also credited as Adolf Northen, Adolf Northern or Adolph Northern; 6 November 1828 – 28 May 1876) was a German painter.

He was born in Münden, Kingdom of Hanover and was a member of Düsseldorf school of painting.

Chiefly depicting battle scenes and particularly events of the Napoleonic Wars, Northen's most noted works include

- Napoleon's Retreat from Russia which depicts the failure of the 1812 invasion of Russia by Napoleon
- Prussian Attack at Plancenoit, showing the Prussian divisions of Hiller, Ryssel and Tippelskirch defeating the French Imperial Young Guard, 1st Battalions of the 2nd Grenadiers and 2nd Chasseurs at the Battle of Waterloo.

Northern died in Düsseldorf aged 48.

== Works ==
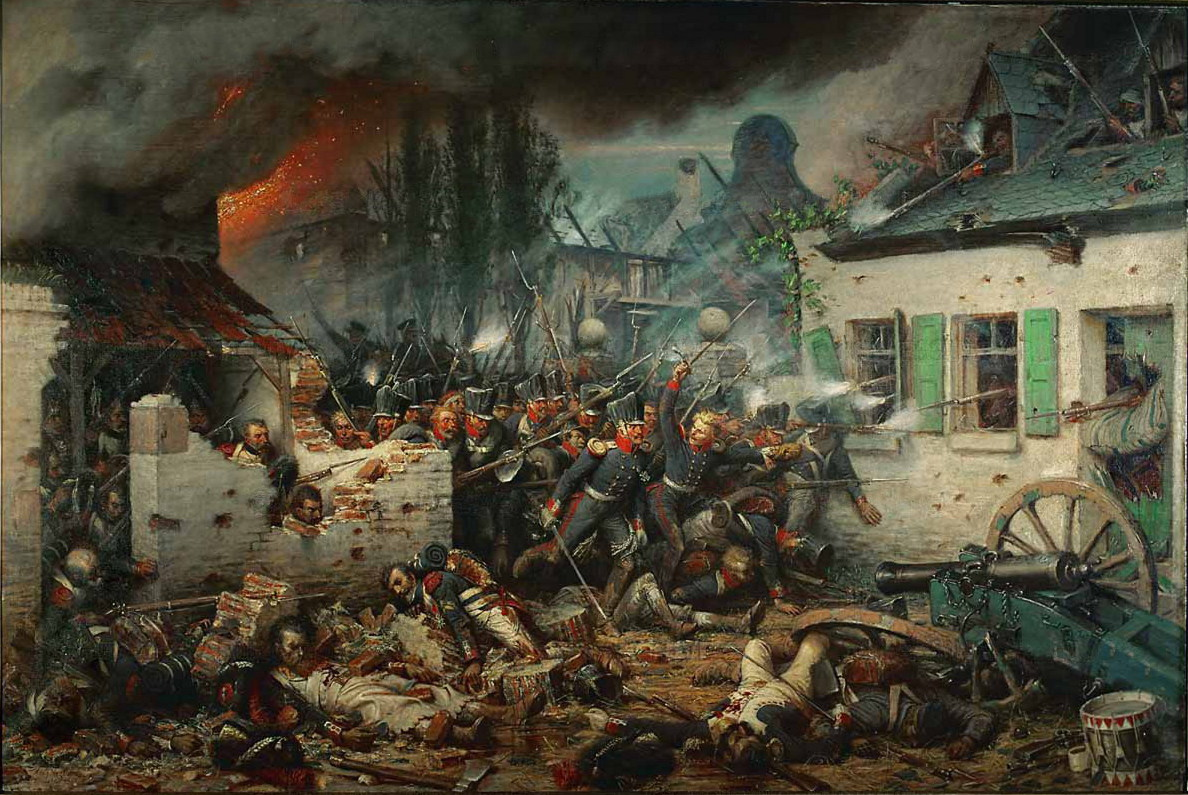
Prussian Attack at Plancenoit, 1863

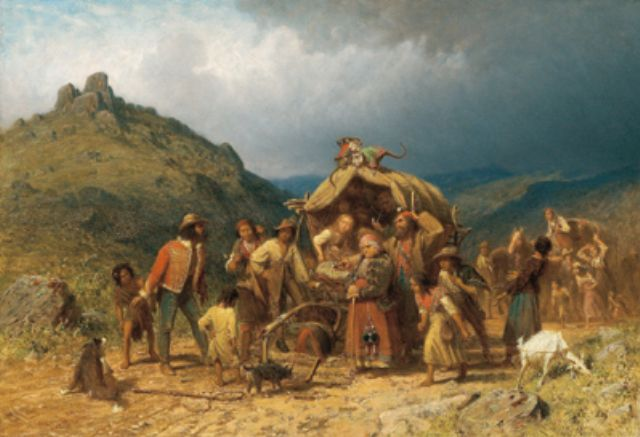
Gypsy Caravan

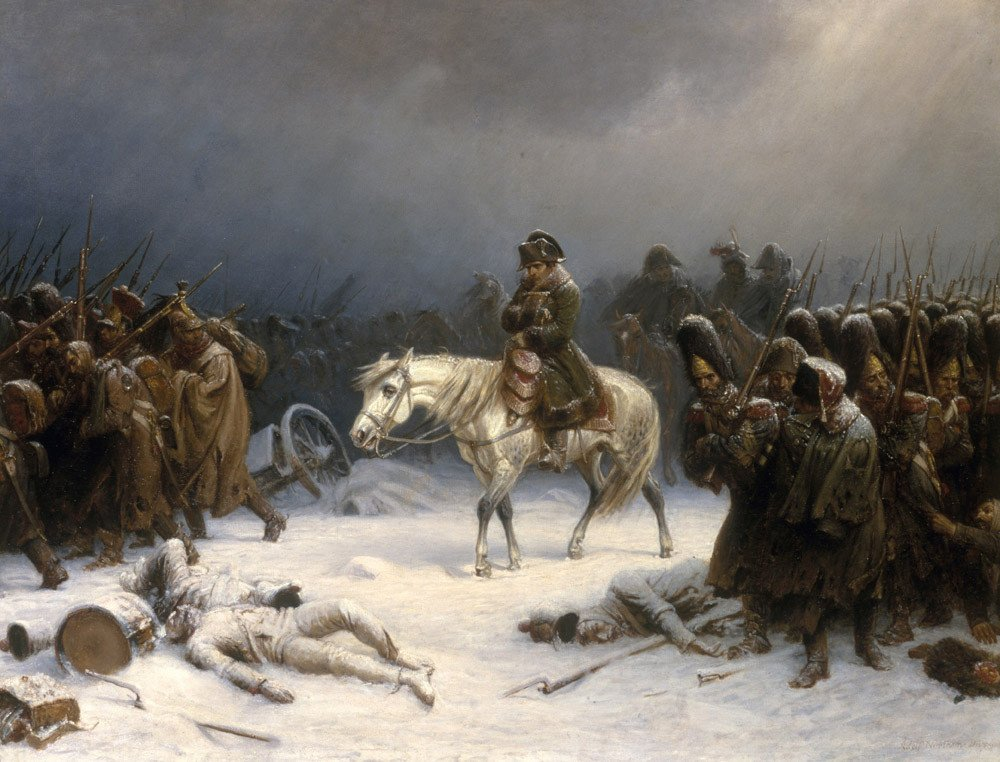
Napoleon's Retreat from Russia

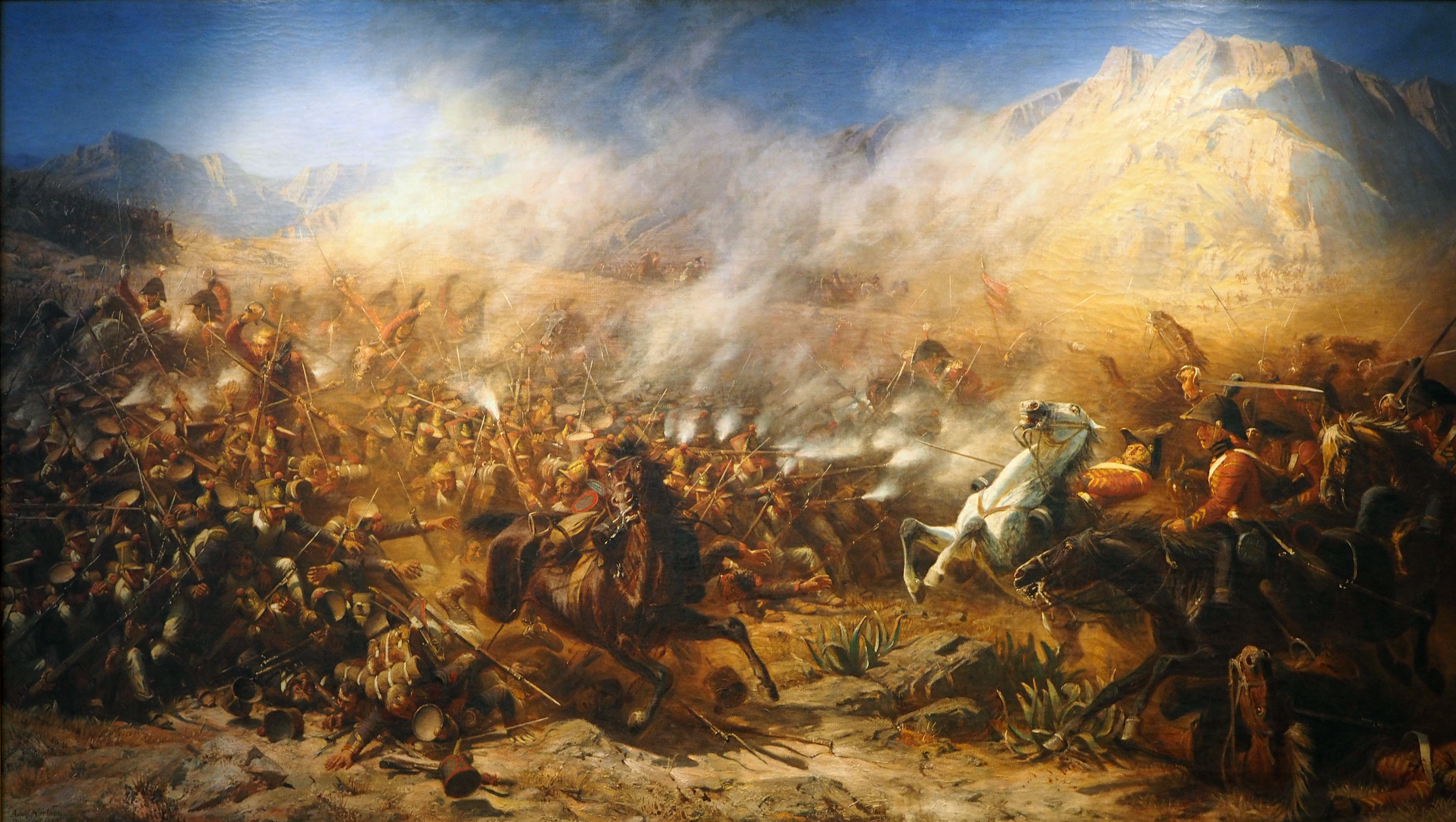
Battle of García Hernández
