= Anaya (name) =

- Language: Spanish

Origin
- Region of origin: Spain, México

Anaya is a Spanish language toponymic surname which originates from the villages of Anaya de Alba, Anaya de Huebra and Anaya in Segovia.

== People with the given name ==
- Anaya Go, Filipina-Chinese singer and musical theater actress
- Anaya Nayanar, Indian Hindu (Shaivite) saint

== People with the surname ==
- Alberto Anaya, Mexican politician and senator
- Carlos Anaya, Uruguayan politician and historian
- Elena Anaya, Spanish actress
- Herbert Anaya (1954–1987), president of the NGO Human Rights Commission of El Salvador
- Ignacio Anaya, Mexican restaurateur
- James Anaya, American Indigenous Rights activist
- Jorge Anaya, Commander-in-Chief of the Argentine Navy
- Julio Anaya, Panamanian basketball referee
- Luis Anaya, Salvadoran professional football player
- Macarena Lorente Anaya, Spanish politician
- Monica Dejesus-Anaya, American drag queen also known as Monica Beverly Hillz
- Pedro María de Anaya (1795–1854), Mexican military officer, twice president of Mexico
- Ricardo Anaya, Mexican politician
- Romeo Anaya, Mexican boxer
- Rudolfo Anaya, Mexican-American author
- Soledad Anaya Solórzano (1895–1978), Mexican educator and writer
- Toney Anaya, American Democratic politician

== Fictional characters ==
- Anaya Imanu, a non-playable character in the 2006 video game Tomb Raider: Legend

== See also ==
- The dictionary definition of Anaya at Wiktionary
- General Anaya (disambiguation)
