= Anaya =

Anaya may refer to:

- Anaya (name), including a list of people and fictional characters with the given name and surname
- Anaya (album), a 2009 album by flutist Nicole Mitchell
- Anaya, a planthopper in the subfamily Flatinae
- Anaya, Segovia, a place in Spain
- Anaya de Alba, a place in Spain

== See also ==
- General Anaya (disambiguation)
- Anya (disambiguation)
- Annayya (disambiguation)
- Annaya, Indonesian drama television series
