= Pedraza =

Pedraza may refer to:

== Places ==
- Pedraza, Magdalena, Colombia
- Pedraza, Segovia, Spain
- Pedraza de Campos, Palencia, Spain
- Pedraza de Alba, Salamanca, Spain
- Pedraza Municipality, Barinas, Venezuela

== People ==
- Ángel Pedraza (1962–2011), Spanish footballer
- José Pedraza (disambiguation)
- Marc Pedraza (born 1987), Spanish footballer
- Alfonso Pedraza (born 1996), Spanish professional footballer
- María Pedraza (born 1996), Spanish actress and social media star
- Manuela Pedraza (fl. 1806), Argentine fighter in the reconquest of Buenos Aires
- Manuel Gómez Pedraza (1789–1851), Mexican general and President of Mexico from 1832 to 1833
- Pilar Pedraza (born 1951), Spanish academic and writer
- Rod Pedraza (born 1969), American baseball player
- Walter Pedraza (born 1981), Colombian cyclist
- Wilfredo Pedraza, Peruvian lawyer and politician
