= Madrid Metropolitan Plan =

The Madrid Metropolitan Plan (Spanish: Plan Regional de Estrategia Territorial) is a regional development plan. It was approved on March 1, 1996 and backed with initial parliamentary approval in 1997. It was enforced until 2001, when the new planning law (Ley del Suelo) required final approval from the Madrid Assembly in order to be enforced.

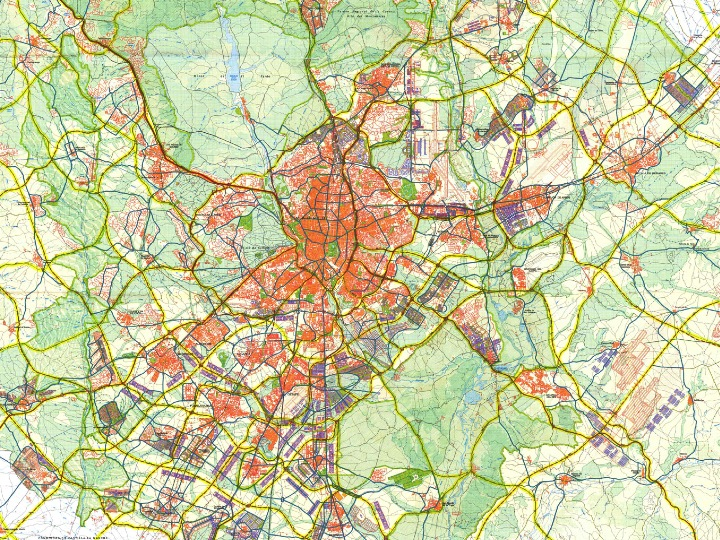
Madrid Reticular Matrix Plan

The Madrid Plan was indicative in nature and was a framework for decision-making in regional planning terms for the Community of Madrid.

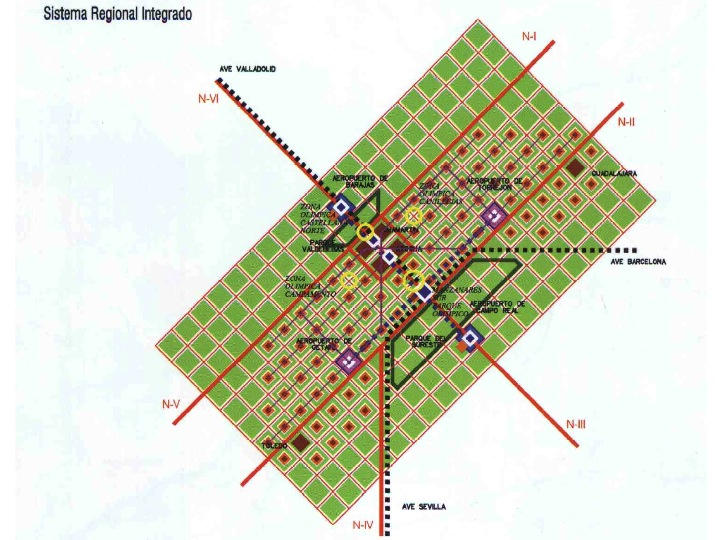
Metropolitan Madrid Structural Form

== Reticular Matrix Planning methodology ==
The Madrid Plan used Reticular Matrix Planning methodology (Ordenacion Reticular del Territorio - ORT).

Metropolitan Madrid has a natural directionality along the Sierra de Guadarrama mountain ridge. This main directionality, along with the Tagus valley, has produced a natural pattern of reticular human settlements. The Madrid Plan used this natural pattern to constitute the basic reticular board for larger transportation infrastructure. The traditional radial-orbital system of metropolitan growth was transformed into a large grid-reticular system.

The metropolitan system was decomposed into five subsystems:

- Environmental ('Green' infrastructure)
- Transportation ('Grey' infrastructure)
- Housing
- Economic activities
- Social facilities

The last three subsystems exist within the compatible, continuous networks of the 'Green' and 'Grey' infrastructure subsystems.

The metropolitan territorial system was composed of two layers of scale intervention:

- The Urban layer (scale 1:5,000), which constituted the ‘fabric’ of the metropolitan system and was conformed according to an urban location model called the BUD (Balanced Urban Development - Unidad de Desarrollo Equilibrado)
- The Metropolitan layer (scale 1:50,000), which constituted the ‘form’ of the metropolitan system and articulated the structure of the metropolis with regional and national functions

The urban layer corresponded to the municipal authority. The metropolitan layer corresponded to the regional (Comunidad) authority.

== Effects of the plan ==
In the 16 years since its initial approval, the Madrid Plan has led to the following developments:

- M-45 freeway (26 km): The freeway has had a strategic effect, transforming metropolitan Madrid's structure from orbital-radial to linear-reticular
- MetroSur (40 km): A southwest cross-peripheral connection that was built as part of the Metro (The Madrid Plan had proposed it as a commuter train)
- Barajas Airport Metro (13 km): An extension of the Metro, connecting it to Barajas Airport
- Metro train to Arganda (16 km) and the future airport of Campo Real
- Strategic Approval of Campo Real Airport: Expected in operation in 2030s
- R-5 freeway (14 km): from Vía Lusitana to Mostoles
- R-3 freeway (25 km): from O’Donnell to Campo Real
- ‘Reservoir road’ (Carretera de los pantanos) M-501 by Boadilla and Brunete
- M-100 by Cobeña and Ajalvir
- Several ‘Balanced Urban Development units’ (BUD's): up 300,000 housing units in all, with priority given to those with mass public transport potentialities or possibilities of commuter train extension: Meco, Torrejón de Ardoz, Arroyomolinos, Navalcarnero, Getafe, Pinto, Valdemoro, Humanes, Griñón
- BUD's and PAU's (Plan de Actuacion Urbanistica) of southeast Madrid: Previously proposed in 1989 and advanced in the Master Plan Draft of 1991 by Mayor Agustín Rodríguez Sahagún
- Carpetania productive areas near Getafe's future freight airport as well as the ones in Meco, Parla, and San Fernando-Torrejón
- Logistics City of the Campo Real plateau
- Metropolitan facilities such as the Warner Brothers Theme Park and Arroyomolinos winter sports complex and shopping center
- National and international facilities such as extension of the Castellana project and Olympic facilities located in Valdecarros, East Centrality and Campamento

All of these projects originated in the reference framework of the Madrid Plan and are consistent in their approach to building up the structure of metropolitan Madrid.

=== Projects in waiting ===
The following projects were also introduced by the Madrid Plan:

- Campo Real Airport
- An underground commuter train line between Mostoles and Henares

== Global applications ==
The plan's technique has influenced other planning processes, among which Bogota's and Dar es Salaam's can be highlighted.

=== Bogotá ===
The application of the methodology to Bogotá in 1998, reinforced by the UNCRD-INTA Report in 2010, has produced 5 main effects:

1. The decision to develop the commuter train system along two of the lines proposed in 1998: Facatativá and Chía
2. The development of the reticular concept for infrastructure completion in the Bogotá savanna region
3. The location of the logistic centralities (north, west and south) in accordance with the reticular directionalities
4. The development of several municipal POT's (Plan de Ordenacion Territorial) in accordance with the ‘Carta metropolitana’ principles
5. The search for an alternative location for the saturated El Dorado International Airport

=== Dar es Salaam ===
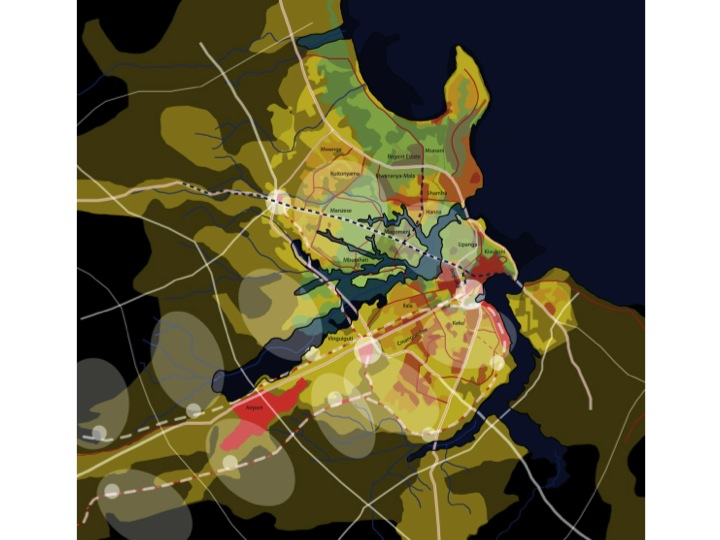
Dar es Salaam reticular matrix

The MSLab (Scales and measures of the contemporary city research lab) at the Politecnico di Milano has developed a proposal of commuter development and metropolitan centralities reinforcement for the mayor's office of Greater Dar es Salaam that largely adheres to the Madrid Plan's approach. The proposal includes five main strategies for development:

1. Armatures: 'Green' and 'Grey' infrastructure
2. Nodes: multiscalar junctions to be developed as centralities
3. Fabric: formality gradients to manage urban informality as well as urban functions, welfare facilities and urban farming
4. Balanced Urban Development (BUD) Units: A replicable model of a flexible urban cell to integrate existing settlements, new developments, welfare provision, infrastructure development, and social dynamics.
5. Welfare poles: adaptative neighborhood scale centralities to provide public ground for transformation
