= Viminatium =

Viminatium was the name of two Roman settlements:

- Viminacium in Serbia
- Terradillos in Spain
