= Sarah Spencer (disambiguation) =

Sarah Spencer is an American musician.

Sarah or Sara Spencer may also refer to:

- Lady Sarah Spencer (1787–1870), wife of William Lyttelton, 3rd Baron Lyttelton; known as Sarah Lyttelton, Baroness Lyttelton
- Sarah Spencer-Churchill (1865–1929), daughter of John Spencer-Churchill, 7th Duke of Marlborough; known as Lady Sarah Wilson
- Sarah Spencer-Churchill (1921–2000), daughter of John Spencer-Churchill, 10th Duke of Marlborough; known as Lady Sarah Spencer-Churchill
- Sarah Spencer (born 1955), sister of Diana, Princess of Wales; known as Lady Sarah McCorquodale
- Sara Andrews Spencer (1837–1909), American suffragist

== See also ==
- Sara Spencer Washington (1889–1953), American beauty salon entrepreneur; America’s first black female millionaire
- Lady Sarah (disambiguation)
