= Alberto Corazón =

Spanish painter and sculptor (1942–2021)

- Born: 21 January 1942; Madrid, Spain
- Died: 10 February 2021 (aged 79); Madrid, Spain
- Education: Complutense University of Madrid
- Occupation: Artist

Alberto Corazón Climent (21 January 1942 – 10 February 2021) was a Spanish multidisciplinary artist who combined graphic design, sculpture, painting, and photography into his works. Some of his works are housed at contemporary museums including Bilbao Fine Arts Museum, Museum of Contemporary Art, Madrid, and Institut Valencià d'Art Modern. He worked as a graphic designer for clients including the organizations National Library of Spain, Autonomous University of Madrid, Anaya, ONCE, Círculo de Bellas Artes, and Renfe Operadora. He was inducted as the member of the Real Academia de Bellas Artes de San Fernando in 2006.

== Early life ==
Corazón was born on 21 January 1942 in Madrid. He studied at the Complutense University of Madrid graduating in economics and sociology in 1965.

== Career ==
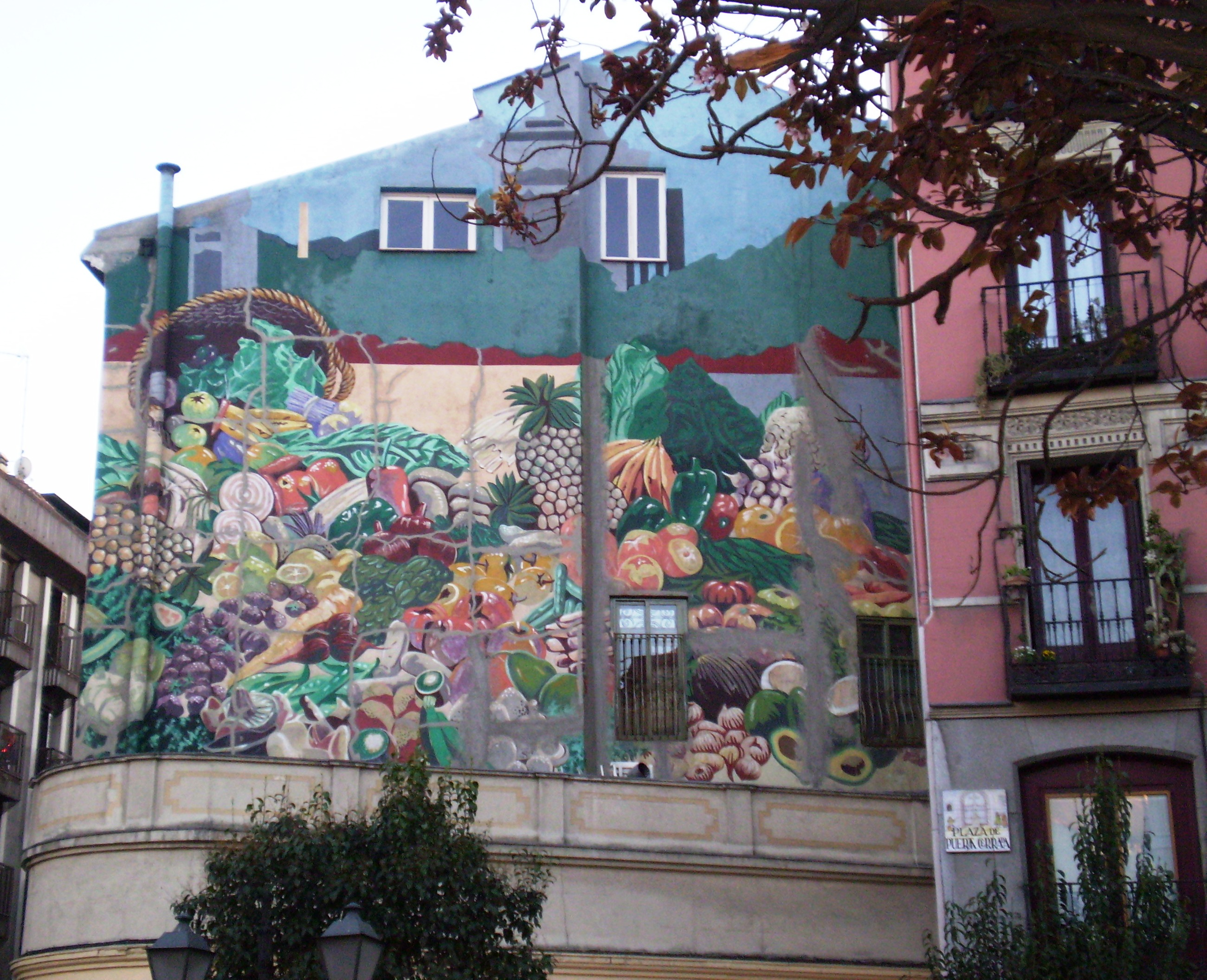
Murals in Madrid by Corazón

Corazón started his career in 1965, designing posters and publishing. He co-founded the Spanish publishing house, New Science. He went on to pursue industrial design and was a multidisciplinary artist combining sculpting, painting, design and photography to his works.

Some of his work as a graphic designer was for Spanish organizations including Anaya, ONCE, Círculo de Bellas Artes, Mapfre, Renfe Operadora, and Telefónica's Domo telephone. Among the designs that he worked on through his career were those for the National Library of Spain, and the National Theatre Company. In addition, he worked on posters, sculptures and other artwork that were displayed in exhibitions across Europe. Some of Corazón's public sculptural work is in Madrid, Murcia, Mallorca, Alicante, as well as in Museo Nacional Centro de Arte Reina Sofía, Institut Valencià d'Art Modern, Bilbao Fine Arts Museum, and Museum of Contemporary Art, Madrid.

His artistic style was described as Conceptual art, where the concept or theme takes precedence over traditional aesthetic and form. He documented part of his vision in an article titled "Conceptual Art in alternate spaces". He partnered with Torres Muntadas on Proyecto Documentos (Project Documents) in 1972. This work alongside Leer la imagen (Reading the Image) was considered indispensable to understanding the artistic expressions of pre-democratic Spain.

Referencing his work, the Spanish newspaper El País, called him el diseño de la democracia (the designer of democracy), referring to the role that Corazón played in Spanish design when the country was going through the transition from dictatorship to democracy after the death of Francisco Franco in 1975. Specifically, Corazón's designs at the time of the transition represented the new images and messages that conveyed the advent of democracy. He was considered one of the fathers of graphic modernization by Spanish institutions at the end of the dictatorship. Works from this period were exhibited at the Venice Biennale in 1976, at Petit Palais as a part of the Paris Biennale in 1978, at the Alexander Iolas Gallery in New York in 1979.

He was the curator of Signos del Siglo: 100 años de Diseño Gráfico en España at the Museo Nacional Centro de Arte Reina Sofía, which showcased graphic design over the previous one hundred years in Spain. He remained active through the 2000s with multiple touring exhibitions within Spain and internationally.

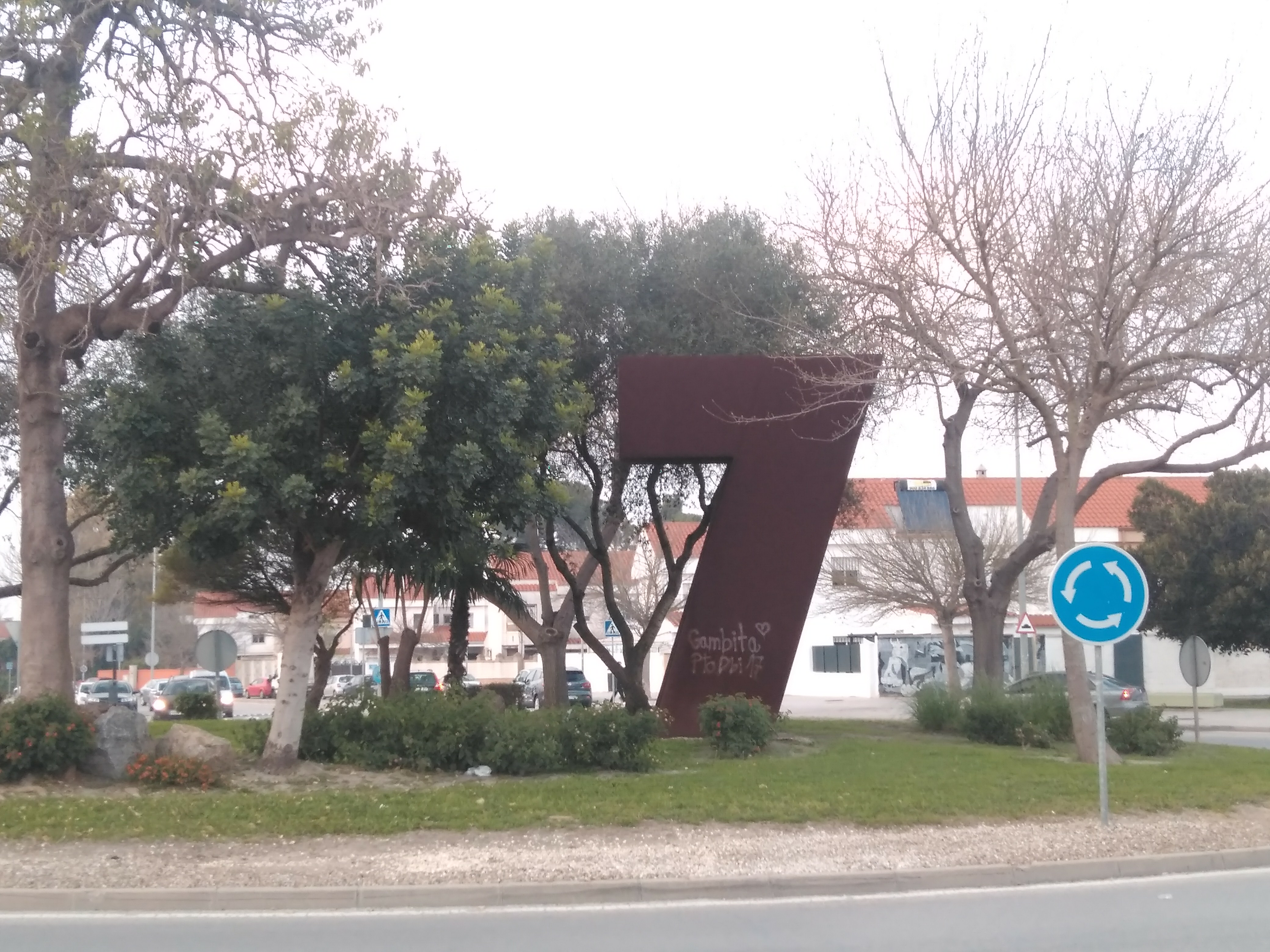
Monument designed by Corazón

Corazón was a recipient of a gold medal from the American Institute of Graphic Arts, and was noted as the only European designer to have received this honor. He also received the Premio Nacional de Diseño, the Spanish national design award, in 1989. He was an elected member of the Real Academia de Bellas Artes de San Fernando in 2006. Some of his other honors include the Barcelona ADG-FAO Prize, the British Design Award, the Council of Europe Alliance Award, the Design Council International Award, and the New York Arts Director Club Award.

== Death ==
Corazón died on 10 February 2021, aged 79. A statement from the Spanish prime minister Pedro Sánchez, called him a "key figure in Spanish art and design, his immense creativity contributed to redrawing the image of our country during the transition".

== Books ==
- Corazón, Alberto (2008). Una mirada en palabras. Barcelona: Seix Barral. ISBN 978-84-322-0908-6. OCLC 230232938.
