= Larrodrigo =

- Municipality
- Coat of arms

- Location in Salamanca
- Coordinates: 40°44′12″N 5°26′57″W
- Country: Spain
- Autonomous community: Castile and León
- Province: Salamanca
- Comarca: Tierra de Alba

Government
  - Mayor: María del Rocio García Barrios (People's Party)

Area
  - Total: 50 km^{2} (19 sq mi)
- Elevation: 870 m (2,850 ft)

Population (2025-01-01)
  - Total: 178
  - Density: 3.6/km^{2} (9.2/sq mi)
- Time zone: UTC+1 (CET)
  - Summer (DST): UTC+2 (CEST)
- Postal code: 37865

Larrodrigo is a municipality located in the province of Salamanca, Castile and León, Spain. As of 2016 the municipality has a population of 190 inhabitants.
