= Éjeme =

- Municipality
- Location in Salamanca

- Location in Spain
- Coordinates: 40°46′N 5°32′W
- Country: Spain
- Autonomous community: Castile and León
- Province: Salamanca
- Comarca: Tierra de Alba

Government
  - Mayor: María Remedios Gallego Martín (People's Party)

Area
  - Total: 17 km^{2} (6.6 sq mi)
- Elevation: 931 m (3,054 ft)

Population (2025-01-01)
  - Total: 139
  - Density: 8.2/km^{2} (21/sq mi)
- Time zone: UTC+1 (CET)
  - Summer (DST): UTC+2 (CEST)
- Postal code: 37891

Éjeme is a village and municipality in the province of Salamanca, western Spain, part of the autonomous community of Castile–León. It is located 27 kilometres (17 mi) from the provincial capital city of Salamanca and has a population of 134 people.

== Geography ==
The municipality covers an area of 17 km^{2} (6.6 sq mi). It lies 931 metres (3,054 ft) above sea level and the postal code is 37891.

== See also ==
- List of municipalities in Salamanca
