= Horcajo Medianero =

- Municipality
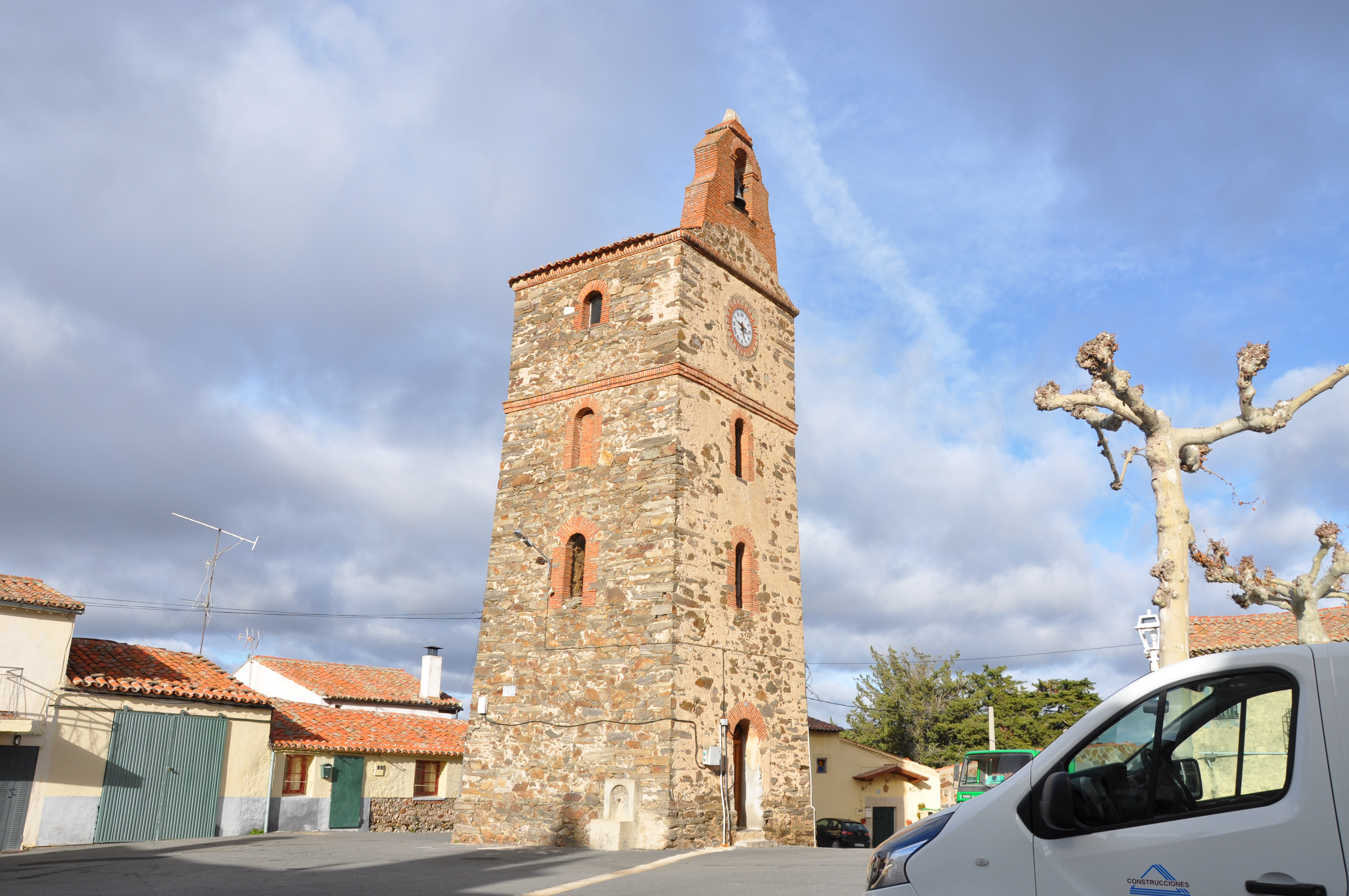

- Location in Salamanca
- Coordinates: 40°38′25″N 5°24′23″W
- Country: Spain
- Autonomous community: Castile and León
- Province: Salamanca
- Comarca: Tierra de Alba

Government
  - Mayor: Carlos José Sánchez Martín (PSOE)

Area
  - Total: 53 km^{2} (20 sq mi)
- Elevation: 1,008 m (3,307 ft)

Population (2025-01-01)
  - Total: 199
  - Density: 3.8/km^{2} (9.7/sq mi)
- Time zone: UTC+1 (CET)
  - Summer (DST): UTC+2 (CEST)
- Postal code: 37860

Horcajo Medianero is a village and municipality in the province of Salamanca, western Spain, part of the autonomous community of Castile-Leon. It is located 48 kilometres (30 mi) from the provincial capital city of Salamanca and has a population of 329 people.

== Geography ==
The municipality covers an area of 53 km^{2} (20 sq mi). It lies 1,008 metres (3,307 ft) above sea level and the postal code is 37860.

== See also ==
- List of municipalities in Salamanca
