= Anaya Nayanar =

Nayanar saint

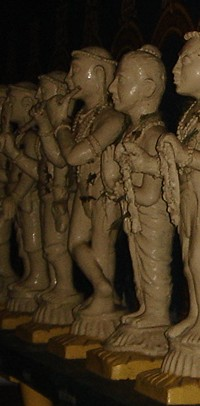
- Anaya Nayanar (centre), depicted playing the flute

Personal life
- Born: Sometime before 8th century Thirumangalam, Tiruchi
- Honors: Nayanar saint,

Religious life
- Religion: Hinduism
- Philosophy: Shaivism, Bhakti

Anaya Nayanar, also known as Anaya and Anayar, is a Nayanar saint, venerated in the Hindu Shaivite sect. Anaya is considered to be the 14th of the 63 Nayanars. His playing of the Panchakshara (five-syllable mantra) on his flute so pleased the god, Shiva, that he took Anaya away to the eternal world.

== Life ==
The life of Anayar is described in the Thirutthondar Puranam (Periya Puranam) by Sekkizhar, which is documents the Histories of the 63 Nayanmar. Anaya is described as a cowherd (ஆயர் or Aayar). Anayar was born and lived his life in Tirumangalam (Thirumangalam), currently in the Indian state of Tamil Nadu. In Anayar's times, Tirumangalam was part of the Kingdom of Mazhanadu (modern-dat Tiruchirappalli district). Tirumangalam is a place of pilgrimage, famous for its Samavedeshvarar Temple, dedicated to Supreme Lord Shiva. Aanaayar used to tend cows. He used to take the cows for grazing in the pastures outside of the town. He used to protect the cattle from disease and beasts of prey. Anayar used to smear Sacred Ash (நீறு) on His body. In the meadows, He used to play the Panchakshara (Five-Letter) Mantra of Supreme Lord Shiva on his flute. Music was his way of worshipping Lord Shiva. A verse from Periya Puranam tells about He crafted a flute from bamboo, following rules in the scriptures.

One day at the onset of the monsoon, Anayar started playing the Holy 5 Letter Word on His flute under the Konrai tree, which is sacred to LORD Shiva, in a garden of blossoming konrai trees. The Periya Puranam devotes several verses to describe the natural beauty of the location. The mellifluous sounds allured all animals. The cows stopped grazing, the calves stopped drinking milk and the birds stopped chirping and listened enthralled. The peacocks danced in joy, while bulls and other wild animals bowed down in bliss. Mortal foes like the snake and the peacock, the lion and the elephant and the tiger and the deer gathered together. The wind stopped blowing, the river calmed down and the waves slowed down to listen to the Divine Music. The Sages of the forest gathered. The celestial beings like Devas (gods), Kinnaras and Vidyadharas descended from heaven. Ultimately, Supreme Lord Shiva appeared with HIS Consort, Goddess Uma, pleased by the melody and blessed Anayar. LORD Shiva took Anayar with HIM to His Eternal Abode Kailasa.

== Iconography and remembrance ==
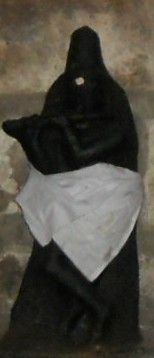
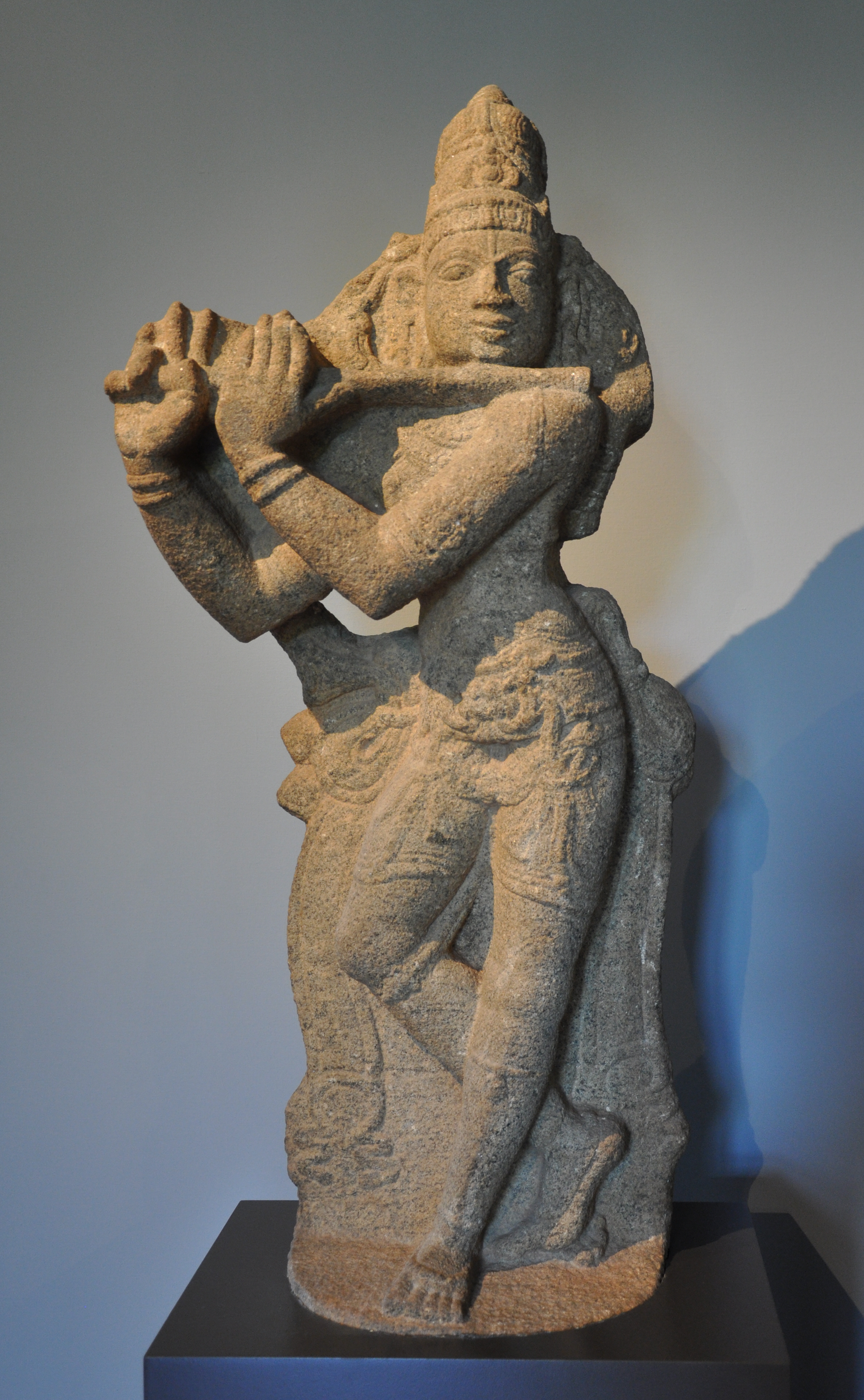
Anaya Nayanar (left) is depicted similar to Venugopala (right).

Anaya Nayanar is depicted very similar to the iconography of Venugopala, a form of Krishna, who is also described as a cowherd. Like Venugopala, he is depicted playing the venu (flute), in a relaxed posture with one leg crossed casually in front of the other. This often leads to confusion in identification of sculptures between Venugopala and Anaya Nayanar.

One of the most prominent Nayanars, Sundarar (8th century) mentions Anaya Nayanar (called Anayan of Mankai here) in hymn to various Nayanar saints.

Anaya Nayanar is specially worshipped in the Tamil month of KArthikai, when the moon enters the Hasta nakshatra (lunar mansion). He receives collective worship as part of the 63 Nayanars. Their icons and brief accounts of his deeds are found in many Shiva temples in Tamil Nadu. Their images are taken out in procession in festivals.
