= Buenavista, Salamanca =

Buenavista
- Municipality
- Location in Salamanca

- Location in Spain
- Coordinates: 40°46′05″N 5°36′40″W
- Country: Spain
- Autonomous community: Castile and León
- Province: Salamanca
- Comarca: Tierra de Alba

Government
  - Mayor: Pedro Agustín Martín Martínez (People's Party)

Area
  - Total: 27 km^{2} (10 sq mi)
- Elevation: 947 m (3,107 ft)

Population (2025-01-01)
  - Total: 368
  - Density: 14/km^{2} (35/sq mi)
- Time zone: UTC+1 (CET)
  - Summer (DST): UTC+2 (CEST)
- Postal code: 37789

Buenavista is a village and municipality in the province of Salamanca, western Spain, part of the autonomous community of Castile-Leon. It is 23 kilometres (14 mi) from the provincial capital city of Salamanca and has a population of 270 people (2016).

It lies 947 metres (3,107 ft) above sea level.

The postal code is 37789.
