= Galinduste =

- Municipality
- Flag Coat of arms

- Location in Salamanca
- Coordinates: 40°39′37″N 5°32′31″W
- Country: Spain
- Autonomous community: Castile and León
- Province: Salamanca
- Comarca: Tierra de Alba

Government
  - Mayor: José Lucas Sánchez (PSOE)

Area
  - Total: 31.63 km^{2} (12.21 sq mi)
- Elevation: 944 m (3,097 ft)

Population (2025-01-01)
  - Total: 401
  - Density: 12.7/km^{2} (32.8/sq mi)
- Time zone: UTC+1 (CET)
  - Summer (DST): UTC+2 (CEST)
- Postal code: 37785

Galinduste is a village and municipality in the province of Salamanca, western Spain, and part of the autonomous community of Castile-Leon. Located 41 kilometres (25 mi) from the provincial capital city of Salamanca, it has a population of 553 people.

== Geography ==
The municipality covers an area of 32 km^{2}. It lies 944 metres (3,097 ft) above sea level. The postal code is 37785.

== See also ==
- List of municipalities in Salamanca
