= Annayya =

Annayya (lit. 'elder brother') may refer to:

- Annayya (2000 film), a Telugu film directed by Mutyala Subbayya
- Annayya (1993 film), a Kannada film directed by Rajendra Singh Babu
- Annayya, cinematographer on films such as Mahakavi Kalidasu

== See also ==
- Anna (disambiguation)
- Anaya (disambiguation)
