= Lady Sarah =

Lady Sarah may refer to:

- Sarah Hughes (journalist) (1972–2021), British journalist known by the pseudonym 'Lady Sarah'
- Lady Sarah McCorquodale, née Spencer (born 1955), sister of Diana, Princess of Wales
- Lady Sarah Chatto, née Armstrong-Jones (born 1964), daughter of Princess Margaret, Countess of Snowdon
- Lady Sarah Keswick (born 1945), queen's companion to Queen Camilla
- Lady Sarah Lennox (1745–1826), daughter of Charles Lennox, 2nd Duke of Richmond
- Sarah Lennox, Duchess of Richmond, née Lady Sarah Cadogan (1705–1751), wife of Charles Lennox, 2nd Duke of Richmond
- Sarah Lyttelton, Baroness Lyttelton, née Lady Sarah Spencer (1787–1870), wife of William Lyttelton, 3rd Baron Lyttelton
- Lady Sarah Spencer-Churchill (1921–2000), daughter of John Spencer-Churchill, 10th Duke of Marlborough
- Sarah Villiers, Countess of Jersey, née Lady Sarah Fane (1785–1867), wife of George Child Villiers, 5th Earl of Jersey
- Lady Sarah Wilson, née Spencer-Churchill (1865–1929), daughter of John Spencer-Churchill, 7th Duke of Marlborough

== See also ==
- Sarah Ferguson, sometimes mistakenly referred to as Lady Sarah
- Lady Sarah controversy
- Princess Sarah (disambiguation)
- Sarah (disambiguation)
