= Fresno Alhándiga =

- Municipality
- Coat of arms

- Location in Salamanca

- Location in Spain
- Coordinates: 40°42′46″N 5°36′58″W
- Country: Spain
- Autonomous community: Castile and León
- Province: Salamanca
- Comarca: Tierra de Alba

Government
  - Mayor: Martín Castello Sánchez

Area
  - Total: 13 km^{2} (5.0 sq mi)
- Elevation: 835 m (2,740 ft)

Population (2025-01-01)
  - Total: 194
  - Density: 15/km^{2} (39/sq mi)
- Time zone: UTC+1 (CET)
  - Summer (DST): UTC+2 (CEST)
- Postal code: 37789

Fresno Alhándiga is a village and municipality in the province of Salamanca, western Spain, part of the autonomous community of Castile-Leon. It is located 35 kilometres (22 mi) from the provincial capital city of Salamanca and has a population of 245 people.

== Geography ==
The municipality covers an area of 13 km^{2} (5.0 sq mi). It lies 835 metres (2,740 ft) above sea level and the postal code is 37789.

== See also ==
- List of municipalities in Salamanca
