= Coca de Alba =

- municipality
- Flag Coat of arms

- Location in Salamanca

- Location in Spain
- Coordinates: 40°52′38″N 5°21′44″W
- Country: Spain
- Autonomous community: Castile and León
- Province: Salamanca
- Comarca: Tierra de Alba

Government
  - Mayor: Antonio González Sánchez (People's Party)

Area
  - Total: 10 km^{2} (3.9 sq mi)
- Elevation: 837 m (2,746 ft)

Population (2025-01-01)
  - Total: 96
  - Density: 9.6/km^{2} (25/sq mi)
- Time zone: UTC+1 (CET)
  - Summer (DST): UTC+2 (CEST)
- Postal code: 37830

Coca de Alba is a municipality in the province of Salamanca, western Spain, part of the autonomous community of Castile-Leon. It is located 35 kilometres (22 mi) from the provincial capital city of Salamanca and has a population of 99 people.

== Geography ==
The municipality covers an area of 10 km^{2} (3.9 sq mi). It lies 837 metres (2,746 ft) above sea level and the postal code is 37830.
