= Metropolitan Reticular Matrix Planning =

Metropolitan Reticular Matrix (1996) planning

Metropolitan Reticular Matrix Planning (also known as 'CT' planning - see below) is an approach to managing the growth of metropolises. It is a type of regional planning, as it deals with issues beyond strict city limits. It was first applied to Madrid Metropolitan Plan in 1996 and has since been applied to a number of other metropolises.

== Reticular Matrix Planning methodology ==
The methodology has two principal components: linearity and scale.

=== Linear-based metropolises ===
Metropolitan Reticular Matrix Planning detected that, counter to Walter Christaller's Central Place Theory, metropolises and urban systems do not exist in ‘featureless plains’. This notion is the precondition to the application of Christaller's theory. To the contrary, Metropolitan Reticular Matrix Planning analyzes that most metropolises develop in a particular geographical site, a strategic location for economic and social relations. A strategic location is one that has a comparative advantage mostly related to a point of transition between two geographical systems: the comparative advantage at the border between two ecosystems.

Strategic locations are places like seaports, river crossings, mountain passages or foothills. Often each ecosystem requires a different mode of transportation. The geographical comparative advantage that requires a logistic intermodal node has been the economic and social base on which metropolises grow.

Geographical features are most commonly linear: a coast, river, ridge, etc. Metropolises are thus naturally determined by a linear direction inconsistent with the circular or hexagonal approach taken by Christaller's theories and most common historical urban planning.

The proper response to linearity is the development of a gradient approach: parallel lines to the main linear feature produce a transversal force gradient. The reticula vertebrated the system in a natural way and responds to the locational needs better than the hexagonal or orbital systems.

=== Metropolitan scales ===
As an aggregation of urban units, the metropolis has a different scale. The integration of the urban and metropolitan scales is the focus of most metropolitan planning conflicts. A scale dialogue has to be articulated. It builds beyond the urban (1:5,000) and metropolitan (1:50,000) scales upwards to the national (1:500,000) and continental (1:5,000,000), as well as downwards to the urban design (1:500) and architecture (1:50) scales.

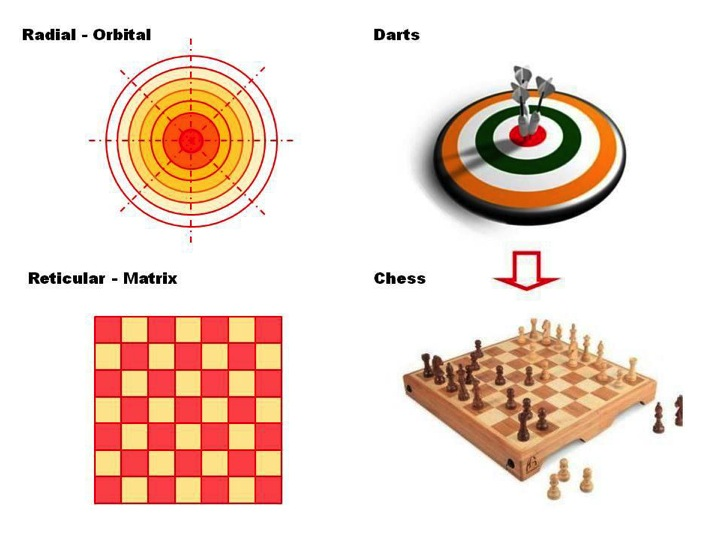
The paradigm shift from radial-orbital to Reticular-Matrix means changing the metropolitan game from darts (aiming for the center) to chess (diverse location strategies).

=== 'Chess on a Tripod' ===
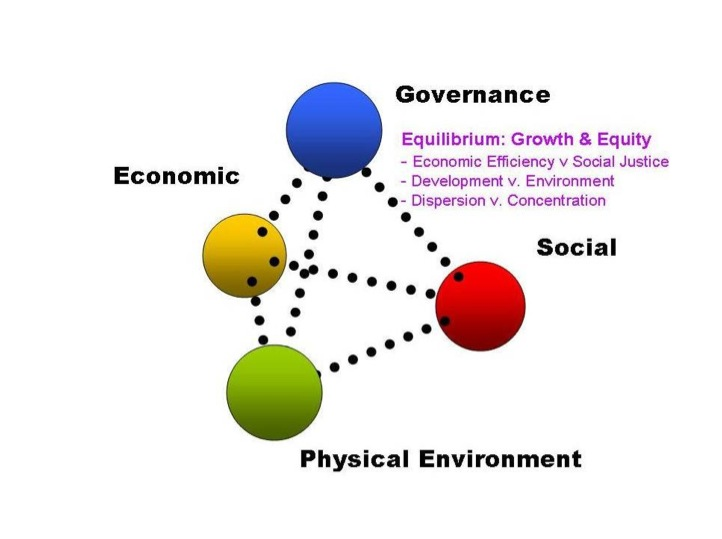
Metropolitan planning requires equilibrium among environmental sustainability, social equity and economic efficiency objectives.

Metropolitan Reticular Matrix Planning has been described as the ‘Chess on a Tripod’ (CT) Method. The method consists of two principles:

Chess: (Also called Chessboard Planning) The Grey infrastructure (transportation) reticula form the basic chessboard pattern. Every municipality located in the core of this cellular structure plays a different role in the metropolitan system. The role played, decided in dialogue between the municipality and the regional-metropolitan authority, can be visualized as the role of the pieces in the Chess Game.

- King (Central Historic district)
- Queen (Main Productive Infrastructure: port/airport)
- Towers (Main secondary metropolitan centers)
- Bishops (Industrial and entrepreneurial productive fabric)
- Horses (Territorial Sub-centers)
- Pawns (Residential municipalities).

As in Chess, the location of these figures (which represent metropolitan functions) determines the results of the 'game,' i.e. control of the territory and the capacity to build up an economically efficient, socially equitable and environmentally sustainable metropolis.

Tripod: The development of a metropolis is based on a three-legged system: economy, sociology and environment. The three legs are under the control of the governance system, which is what unites the policy making of the three realms. The stool represents the government and the three legs constitute the tripod.

The objective of economic policies is to achieve efficiency. The objective of social policies is to achieve equity. The objective of environmental policies is to achieve sustainability (often involving implementing Green infrastructure). The objective of institutional governance is to achieve equilibrium (‘Ethical Equilibrium’) among the three areas.

It is upon this tripod mechanism that metropolitan planning must evolve its spatial integrative policies to maintain the efficiency, equity, sustainability and equilibrium in the 5 subsystems (Environment, Transport, Housing, Productive Activities and Social Facilities) that constitute the metropolitan system.

=== Mechanisms ===
The mechanisms of the CT planning method require dialogue beyond that among the 3 legs of the stool, the Fabric and Form, and the 5 sub-systems. There are other realms of metropolitan decision making dialogues included in the method:

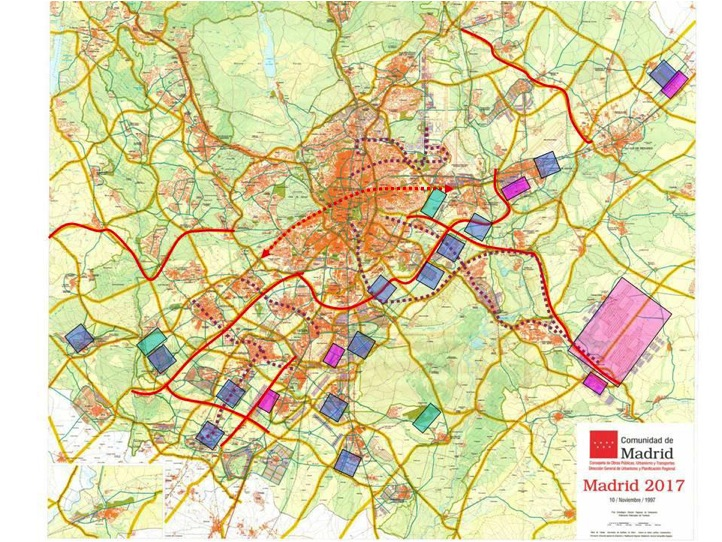
Dialogue between administrations produced metropolitan strategic projects for investment and implementation within the metropolitan vision of the Madrid Plan.

- Long: The CT method suggests that metropolitan planning deal with long-term strategic issues (20 or even 40 year horizons, rather than the 12 year horizons of urban planning).
- Wide: The CT Method suggests that metropolitan planning does not just deal with the physical layout approach of most of urban planning. It has to incorporate economics, sociology and governance to deal with the complexity of the future evolution of the Metropolis and effectively contribute to its development.
- Indicative: The method is an indicative approach to consensus building rather than a compulsory method. As such, it is more based in social capital continuous policy making and consensus building versus formal administrative blueprint planning. Because many layers of government (and other stakeholders) are involved in metropolitan planning, decision making is so dispersed that no government layer can impose through a compulsory plan the policies to be implemented by the other autonomous and independent authorities.
- Synchronic consensus: Under the indicative umbrella, two types of consensus have to be achieved. The consensus among the existing authorities of different rank and level has to be achieved to put forward consistent policies among those authorities. This ‘just in time’ consensus is called ‘Synchronic Consensus.’ It is the actual consensus among the stakeholders and authorities involved in the development process.
- Diachronic consensus: The long-term vision of metropolitan planning requires not only an immediate consensus with the responsible authorities and stakeholders, but also a long-term consensus with future authorities (as far as 20–40 years away). This is called ‘Diachronic consensus.’ As it is impossible to know in a democratic system who those authorities will be, the way to achieve this consensus is both by having a permanent dialogue with the existing representatives of the political parties which are most likely to form those future governments and to have a system of planning that will allow for adaptation as those successive governments come to place. Flexibility and adaptability, represented in the Variable Geometry and Sliding Horizon mechanisms (below) are a way of proving to future governments that there is no intention of imposing a metropolitan plan upon them and that the plan is prepared for the dialogue of receiving their adaptations and revisions.

Madrid's form, as highlighted by the Metropolitan Plan. Diagrammatic structure is unique for every metropolis and constitutes the base for strategic projection.

- Variable Geometry: In the CT Method, the average plan spans 24 years. When forecasting is done for such a long period the variables are so uncertain that any specific extrapolation is likely to be inaccurate. The response is to have a flexible approach to the conclusions resulting from those extrapolations both to be able to respond to the needs forecasted but also to adapt if there are major variations or shift in tendencies.

The Balanced Urban Development unit is the model for the land use allocation of the basic urban fabric (1:5,000). The model is adapted in each case to the urban specificities.

- Sliding Horizon: Taking the average plan (24 years) as an example, another consideration arises. Every new Government has the possibility to revise it (Diachronic Consensus) and adapt it (Variable Geometry). As it does (say, every 4 years) the scope of the plan and its final horizon shortens. In the final phase, when the plan is revised for the last time, 20 years after continuous implementation and 4 years before the end, the scope would only be 4 years. The long-term horizon would be lost. In order to maintain a strategic, long-term vision necessary for adequate metropolitan planning, the Plan has to be revised/adapted every 4 years, but the horizon (24 years, in this example) should remain the constant. With every revision the horizon should be prolonged to always keep the 24 year vision. This periodical slide of the system into the future keeping the 24 year time frame every 4 years is called the ‘Sliding Horizon.’
- Reticular Matrix: The geo-topographical directionality defined by the linear ecosystem border generates a reticular gradient parallel and perpendicular to that line. The cells of the reticula constitute a matrix of urban features.
1. Form: The roles and relations of the cells, as the way to address those relations, constitute the Form of the Metropolis (1:50,000 scale).
2. Fabric: The distributions of functions (either following the Balanced Urban Development model or presenting peculiarities depending on the role they play in the Form Structure) constitute the Urban Fabric (1:5,000 Scale). Through the change of scale and the formation of new relations, the new built form type, the fabric experiences a deep typological reform and is conceptually metamorphosed.

The Reticula, like a music pentagram, are the structural framework to hold the notes. The cells of the Matrix are the substantive units. They constitute the uniqueness of metropolitan space: the architecture of the metropolis.

== Difference from urban planning ==
The elements of the CT Method (mentioned above) make it a markedly different system than the common methodologies of urban planning.

- Urban Planning relates the rights and dues of the population (land ownership and its rights) to the urban structure under the responsibility of the Local Authority. Urban Planning is the dialogue between the Local Authority and the Citizens.
- Metropolitan Planning is different in the fact that it does not relate a single administration with its citizens; it relates the different administrations of a complex territory among themselves to build up a common and consistent strategy for the territory under their shared responsibilities.

The CT Method argues that while urban planning relates the administration (local authority) and the administrated (citizens), Metropolitan Planning relates the various administrations among themselves. The indicative (versus compulsory) procedure, consensus building emphasis and the mechanisms (variability, adaptability, time and sectors) are different, as is reflected both in process and outcome. Addressing metropolitan mechanisms with common urban planning methods is at the origin of the failures of metropolitan planning.

== Applications of the method ==
The CT Method has been applied within the World Bank for strategic analysis of rapidly growing metropolises, allowing for both long-term development vision as well as short term decision making for structural projects, as is the case of NaMSIP (Nairobi Metropolitan Services Improvement Project).

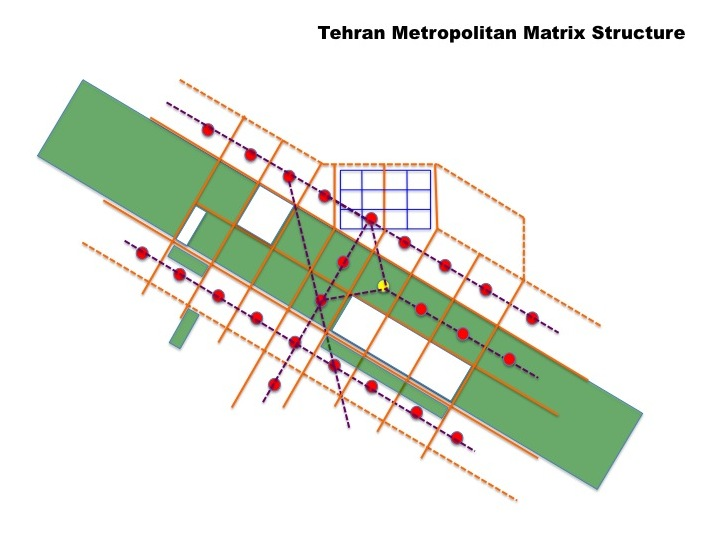
Tehran metropolitan structure. The methodology has been applied by the World Bank to numerous metropolises.

Other World Bank 'D4D Propositive Analyses' include:

- Accra (Ghana)
- Amman (Jordan)
- Baku (Azerbaijan)
- Barranquilla/Cartagena/S. Marta (Colombia)
- Bogotá (Colombia)
- Cairo (Egypt)
- Colombo (Sri Lanka)
- Dar es Salaam (Tanzania)
- Istanbul (Turkey)
- Kampala (Uganda)
- Kigali (Rwanda)
- Lao Cai/Phu Ly/Vinh (Vietnam)
- Leknath (Nepal)
- Manila (Philippines)
- Mexico City (Mexico)
- Mombasa (Kenya)
- N'Djamena (Chad)
- Nairobi (Kenya)
- Tunis (Tunisia)

Influences of the system also may be seen in the Panama Metropolitan Plan (Panama 1997) and the Strategic Plan of Colombo (Sri Lanka 1996).

The method has been used in some academic institutions and universities to develop urban projects in Bari, Dar es Salaam, Cairo and Tehran within a consistent metropolitan context.

=== Madrid Metropolitan Plan ===
The Madrid Metropolitan Plan was the first application, under the direction of Pedro B. Ortiz, of the CT method, approved administratively in 1996 and backed by the Madrid Regional Parliament in May 1997.

The Plan was the physical continuation of a previously developed exercise of Strategic Urban Planning in 1989-1994 and established a framework for the future development of the Metropolis of Madrid. The numerous territorial decisions taken during the enforcement period until the new Planning Law of 2001 required revision and approval, have been determinant to the actual shape and efficiency of the metropolitan structure of Madrid.

Under the plan, to respond to the rapid growth Madrid was experiencing (50% every 20 years), the Metropolitan Reticular Matrix Planning methodology was set in place. The CT Method principles are the foundation of the design, implementation and management of this Metropolitan Plan.
