= Anaya Go =

- Born: Jemaina Marie Pangilinan Gonida; October 5 Quezon City, Philippines
- Genres: Pop, traditional pop, broadway, adult contemporary
- Occupations: Singer, Thespian
- Instrument: Vocals
- Years active: 2010–present

Born Jemaina Marie Pangilinan Gonida on October 5, better known by her stage name Anaya Go, is a Filipina-Chinese singer and musical theater actress. She started her professional career in musical theater in 2010 under Teatro Expedicion de Filipinas wherein she played Belle Marie in The Hunchback of Notre-Dame The Musical, Maria Clara in Pepe: Ang Talambuhay at Panaginip ni Jose Rizal, Miss Amelia in Sara, Ang Munting Prinsesa, to name a few, alongside veteran theater and TV actors Bodjie Pascua, Biboy Ramirez, Kathleen Hermosa and Anna Luna. She has joined a couple of Philippine reality singing searches both in ABS-CBN and GMA like Search for the Star in a Million and Are You The Next Big Star?. She became part of City of Dreams Manila's all-female vocal group Dream Sirens in 2015 and is featured regularly at Balesin Island Club, an exclusive resort in Polillo, Quezon.

== Early life ==
=== Family ===
Anaya Go was born at Jesus Delgado Memorial Hospital on October 5 in Kamuning, Quezon City to Jeffrey Gonida and Mary Ann Pangilinan-Gonida. She is the eldest of five children.

=== Education ===
She began her voice and stage training at the Center for Pop Music Philippines, Inc. when she became one of the Luzon finalists of Search for a Star in a Million in 2005. During the same year, Go decided to focus on finishing her college degree before pursuing a career in music. Go entered college and took up Bachelor of Arts in Communication at De La Salle University - Dasmariñas, and graduated in 2009. Right after her graduation, she joined Are You The Next Big Star?, a reality music competition developed by GMA New Media, Inc. and finished being a semi-finalist. She also took up intensive voice lessons at The Music School of Ryan Cayabyab.

== Music career ==
=== Stage name ===
Her siblings call her "Achie" which means eldest sister in Fukkien, while her relatives and childhood friends call her Jemaina, Meejay or Gigi. In school, Go's classmates gave her the nicknames Jem, Chai, Ania and Ianne. Go had used many nicknames until the night of her graduation in college. A barista handed Go a cup of coffee that has the name Anaya (misspelled Ania), hence, the birth of her stage name.

=== Teatro Expedicion de Filipinas ===
Go discovered her passion in singing and acting when she joined a summer acting workshop in 2010. Formerly known as Expedition Theatre Association Inc., Teatro Expedicion de Filipinas was formed in 1999 by Mr. Rosendo Campano and Filipino theater, movie and television actor Joey Paras. The theater group started the development of "independent theater productions" in the Metro, and is engaged in staging original and quality works such as values-oriented musicals, straight plays and storytelling skits for smart and groovy young children.

Her musical theatre debut was in May 2010, during TEDF's summer workshop recital at Luneta Open Air Auditorium. Go played Belle Marie, a character that was never mentioned in the original story written by Victor Hugo, but was re-imagined by Paras as the alter-ego of Quasimodo played by Leo Ponseca, along with Bodjie Pascua as Judge Claude Frollo and Anna Luna as Esmeralda. Her second production was Pepe, Ang Talambuhay at Panaginip ni Jose Rizal (Pepe: The Life Story and Dream of Rizal), which narrated the events that happened the night before Rizal's execution. Go played O Sei San, one of the nine women who captured the heart of Rizal. She also played Maria Clara, Leonor Rivera and Josephine Bracken during Pepe's national tour, Miss Amelia in Sara, Ang Munting Prinsesa, Isang Musika-Novela and Martha in Borrowed Parts.

=== Dream Sirens ===
In 2015, she became part of Dream Sirens, an all-female and homegrown musical sensation of City of Dreams Manila.

== Filmography ==
=== Theatre ===
Title	Role
The Hunchback of Notre-Dame The Musical	Belle Marie
Pepe, Ang Talambuhay at Panaginip ni Jose Rizal	Maria Clara/O Sei San/Leonor Rivera/Josephine Bracken/Donya Victorina
Sara, Ang Munting Prinsesa, Isang Musika-Novela	Miss Amelia/Miss Minchin/Lavinia
Borrowed Parts	Martha
