= Sieteiglesias de Tormes =

- Municipality
- Coat of arms

- Location in Salamanca
- Coordinates: 40°44′30″N 5°34′39″W
- Country: Spain
- Autonomous community: Castile and León
- Province: Salamanca
- Comarca: Tierra de Alba

Government
  - Mayor: Oscar Maide Sánchez (PSOE)

Area
  - Total: 14 km^{2} (5.4 sq mi)
- Elevation: 821 m (2,694 ft)

Population (2025-01-01)
  - Total: 193
  - Density: 14/km^{2} (36/sq mi)
- Time zone: UTC+1 (CET)
  - Summer (DST): UTC+2 (CEST)
- Postal code: 37892

Sieteiglesias de Tormes is a village and municipality in the province of Salamanca, western Spain, part of the autonomous community of Castile and León. It is located 31 kilometres from the provincial capital city of Salamanca and has a population of 204 people.

== Geography ==
The municipality covers an area of 14 km^{2}. It lies 821 metres above sea level and the postal code is 37892.
