= Galisancho =

- Municipality
- Location in Salamanca
- Coordinates: 40°44′32″N 5°33′17″W
- Country: Spain
- Autonomous community: Castile and León
- Province: Salamanca
- Comarca: Tierra de Alba

Government
  - Mayor: José Rodríguez Sánchez (People's Party)

Area
  - Total: 23 km^{2} (8.9 sq mi)
- Elevation: 820 m (2,690 ft)

Population (2025-01-01)
  - Total: 320
  - Density: 14/km^{2} (36/sq mi)
- Time zone: UTC+1 (CET)
  - Summer (DST): UTC+2 (CEST)
- Postal code: 37891

Galisancho is a village and municipality in the province of Salamanca, western Spain, part of the autonomous community of Castile-Leon. It is located 30 kilometres (19 mi) from the provincial capital city of Salamanca and has a population of 405 people.

== Geography ==
The municipality covers an area of 23 km^{2} (8.9 sq mi). It lies 820 metres (2,690 ft) above sea level and the postal code is 37891.

== See also ==
- List of municipalities in Salamanca
