= Tierra de Alba, Salamanca =

Tierra de Alba
- Comarca
- Location in Salamanca
- Country: Spain
- Autonomous community: Castile and León
- Province: Salamanca

Area
  - Total: 730.97 km^{2} (282.23 sq mi)

Population
  - Total: 15,146
  - Density: 20.720/km^{2} (53.666/sq mi)
- Time zone: UTC+1 (CET)
  - Summer (DST): UTC+2 (CEST)

Tierra de Alba is a comarca in the province of Salamanca, Castile and León. It contains 28 municipalities: Alba de Tormes, Aldeaseca de Alba, Anaya de Alba, Armenteros, Beleña, Buenavista, Chagarcía Medianero, Coca de Alba, Éjeme, Encinas de Arriba, Fresno Alhándiga, Gajates, Galinduste, Galisancho, Garcihernández, Horcajo Medianero, Larrodrigo, La Maya, Martinamor, Navales, Pedraza de Alba, Pedrosillo de Alba, Pelayos, Peñarandilla, Sieteiglesias de Tormes, Terradillos, Valdecarros and Valdemierque.
