= La Maya =

- Municipality
- Location in Salamanca
- Coordinates: 40°41′15″N 5°36′49″W
- Country: Spain
- Autonomous community: Castile and León
- Province: Salamanca
- Comarca: Tierra de Alba

Government
  - Mayor: Domingo González Clavero (PSOE)

Area
  - Total: 7 km^{2} (2.7 sq mi)
- Elevation: 833 m (2,733 ft)

Population (2025-01-01)
  - Total: 163
  - Density: 23/km^{2} (60/sq mi)
- Time zone: UTC+1 (CET)
  - Summer (DST): UTC+2 (CEST)
- Postal code: 37780

La Maya is a municipality located in the province of Salamanca, Castile and León, Spain. As of 2016 the municipality has a population of inhabitants.
