= Soledad Anaya Solórzano =

Mexican educator and writer

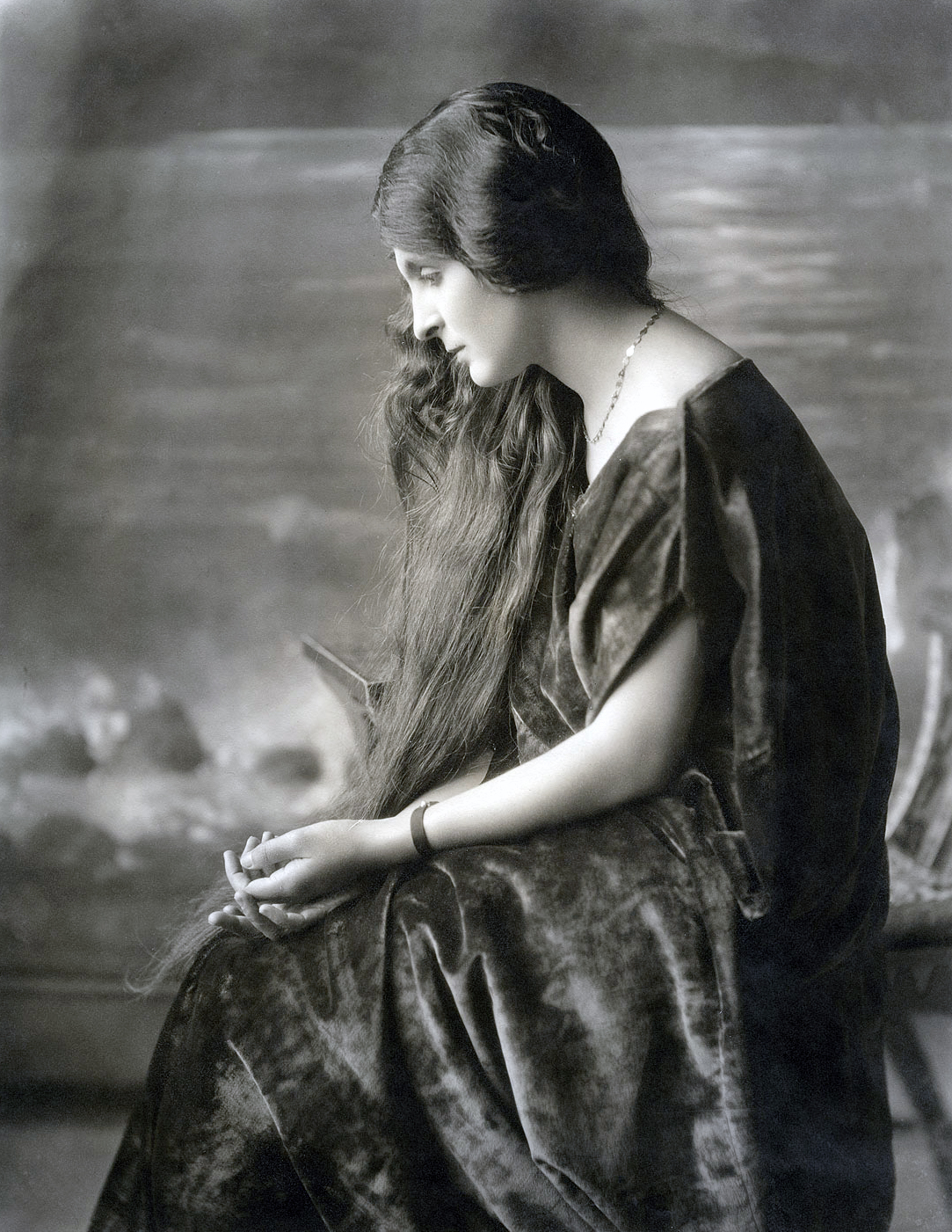
- Born: May 20, 1895; Guadalajara, Mexico
- Died: February 24, 1978 (aged 82); Mexico City, Mexico
- Education: School of Philosophy and Letters, UNAM
- Occupation(s): Professor, writer

Soledad Anaya Solórzano (May 20, 1895 – February 24, 1978) was a Mexican educator and writer. She was founder and director of Secondary School No. 8, president of the Seminary of Pedagogical Studies, General Director of Secondary Education, and professor at the National Autonomous University of Mexico. Her book Literatura española, a Spanish manual for the use of secondary school students, first published in 1941, has had thirty editions.

== Biography ==
Soledad Anaya Solórzano was born in Guadalajara on May 20, 1895. She dedicated her entire life to teaching and to the cultural and pedagogical dissemination of education in Mexico. She received her degree as a teacher of primary instruction at the Catholic Normal School of Guadalajara in 1913, and later studied at the National Autonomous University of Mexico (UNAM) at the School of Higher Studies (currently the School of Philosophy and Letters), from which she graduated as a teacher of letters in 1930. During the Mexican Revolution, she moved with her family to Mexico City, where she practiced her profession from 1915 to 1924. In the latter year she began teaching Spanish literature, a subject in which she became a specialist.

In 1925, Undersecretary of Education Moisés Sáenz chose her to be part of the commission of educators who went to study methods and organization of secondary education in the United States in professional improvement courses at Columbia University. Upon her return, she founded Secondary School No. 8, which she directed for over a decade. She also held positions within the highest levels of the educational system. Starting in 1929, she was a secondary education teacher, and promoted its establishment in Mexico. She was a member of the commission that established secondary education in Monterrey, and was founder of the Society of Directors of Secondary Schools. From 1935 to 1950, she trained secondary school teachers in various Mexican cities. She was General Director of Secondary Education from 1944 to 1946. From 1946 to 1949, she directed the Higher Normal School (Spanish: Escuela Normal Superior) of the Federation of Private Schools, and taught higher Spanish and literature classes there.

She was part of the first group of teachers when the Escuela Normal Superior de México was inaugurated in 1946. She held professorships at the Escuela Nacional Preparatoria and UNAM. From 1959 to 1972 she was a technical adviser to the National Commission for Free Textbooks. In 1962, she presented a project of reforms to the programs and study plans, in order to streamline and revitalize teaching. She was also part of the first team of pedagogues selected to create the free textbooks. In addition to collaborating on the edition of textbooks, she participated in assemblies, pedagogical congresses, and published articles in specialized education magazines.

== Legacy ==
Octavio Paz was one of her students. In a 1996 interview in Letras Libres, the writer spoke of his experience in secondary school:

I had a great literary admiration, in female teachers more than in male teachers. The first public appearance of women in Mexico is in education. I had admirable teachers whom I still remember fondly... I had a teacher, Soledad Anaya: zealous, very much a purist.

Eva Sámano selected Anaya as a literary teacher and director of the Heroes of Liberty Secondary School in 1965, which she inaugurated in Coyoacán, positions that she held until her death.

Soledad Anaya died in Mexico City on February 24, 1978.

== Awards and recognition ==
- 1956 – Manuel López Cotilla Medal, for her didactic work
- 1974 – Named Woman of the Year by the Lady Publicists of Mexico and Associates
- 1998 – Postage stamp issued in Anaya's honor for the commemoration of Teacher's Day

Institutions such as the day school in Cuauhtémoc, a kindergarten in Tlaquepaque, elementary schools in Tijuana, and in Ensenada have been named in her honor.

== Works ==
=== Books ===
- El poeta latino Horacio, imitador y original, Andrés Botas, 1920.
- La mujer y la educación, 1926
- Literatura española: tercer curso de español, drawings by Imelda Calderón, Porrúa 1941; 26th ed. 1977.
- Las actividades escolares no académicas y su función educativa (fascicle), Society of Directors of Secondary Schools, 1943.
- Integración de la segunda enseñanza en el sistema educativo nacional, 1946.
- Carta a Ma. Edmée Álvarez. La lengua española a través de selectos autores mexicanos, 1954.
- La mujer y la paz, 1956.
- Como administrar y organizar una escuela secundaria, Eds. de la SEP, 1956.
- Prólogo de Peñas arriba y Sotileza, 1966.

=== Lectures ===
- La primera jornada ha concluido, Society of Directors of Secondary Schools, 1943.
- Mujeres en la obra de Cervantes (in tribute to the Women's University of Mexico), 1947.

== See also ==
- Secondary education in Mexico
