= José Pedraza =

José Pedraza may refer to:

- José Pedraza (boxer) (born 1989), Puerto Rican boxer
- José Pedraza (racewalker) (1937–1998), Mexican race walker
