= Princess Sarah (disambiguation) =

Princess Sarah is a Japanese animated television series aired in 1985, based on the novel A Little Princess by Frances Hodgson Burnett.

Princess Sarah may also refer to:

- Sarah Culberson (fl. 2000s–2020s), Sierra Leone princess
- Princess Sarah Zeid of Jordan (born 1972), Jordanian princess
- Sarah Ferguson (born 1959), former wife of the former Prince Andrew, Duke of York
- Princess Sarah (TV series), a Philippine TV series based from the same title aired in 2007

== See also ==
- Lady Sarah (disambiguation)
- Sarah (disambiguation)
