= William A. Newman =

American painter

William A. Newman (born 1948 in Great Lakes, IL) is an American painter and computer artist residing in Washington, D.C.

== Early life and education ==
Newman received his BFA at the Maryland Institute College of Art for Painting. His early medical studies were of great influence to his later paintings at MICA, which often involved bloody, gruesome scenes.

After his BFA at MICA, in 1971, Newman spent one year running the Art Store at the Corcoran School of Art. During this time, he met many young artists, with whom he would create the group "The Washington Color Pencil School". These artists also organized an exhibit of the same name at the Corcoran Gallery of Art in 1973.

In 1973, Newman began studying for his MFA at University of Maryland.

Also in 1973, Newman began working as a teacher at the Corcoran School of Art.

In 1979, Newman was diagnosed with Multiple Sclerosis.
