= Herbert Anaya =

Herbert Ernesto Anaya Sanabria
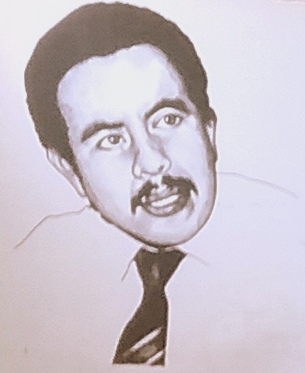
- Mural painting in the auditorium dedicated to his honor at the School of Jurisprudence and Social Sciences of the University of El Salvador
- Born: 1954; San Salvador
- Died: October 26, 1987 (aged 32–33)
- Occupation: President of the NGO

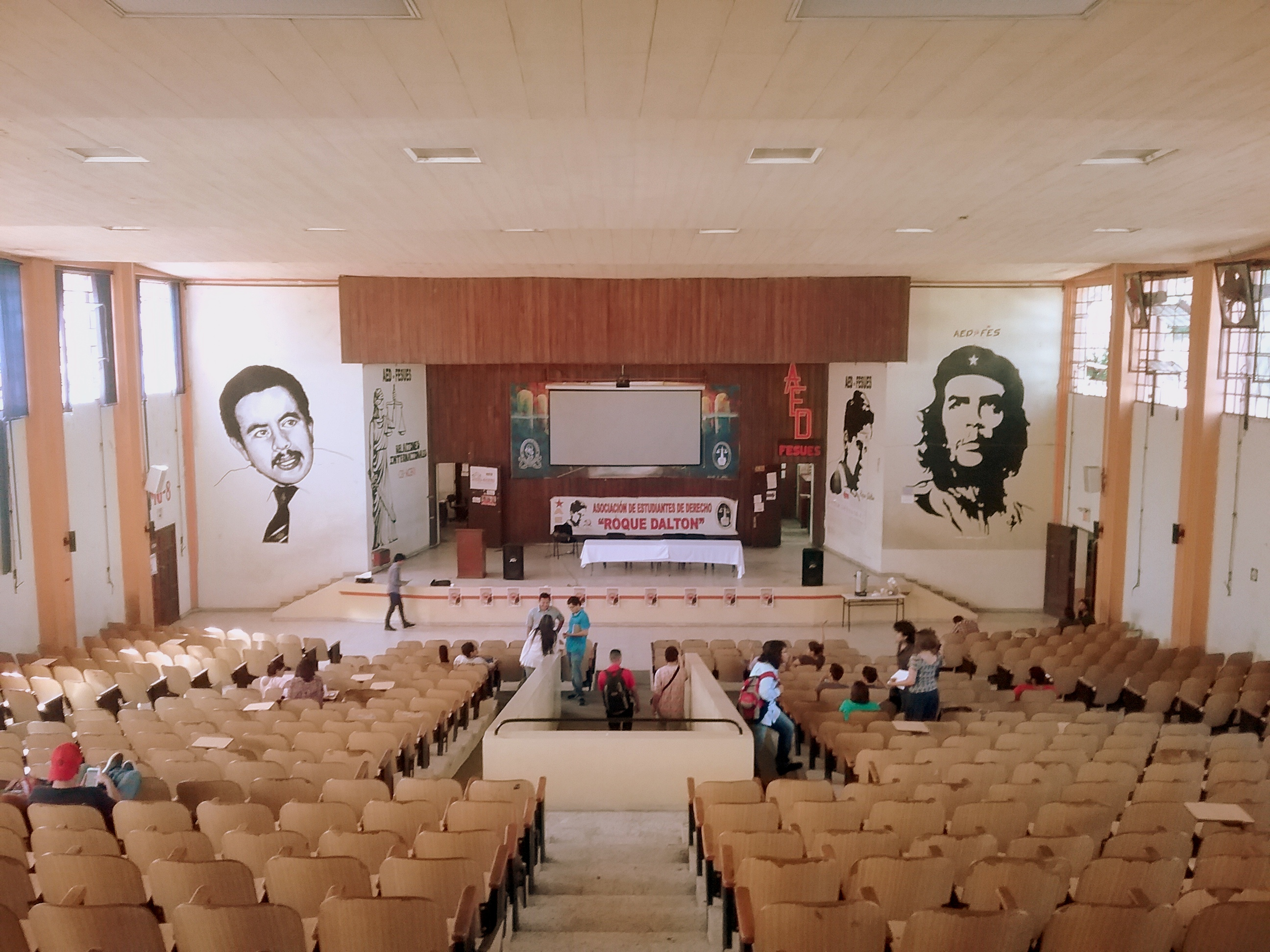
Herbert Anaya Sanabria Auditorium, Faculty of Jurisprudence and Social Sciences (UES). October 26, 1987. Human rights defender Herbert Anaya Sanabria was assassinated near his home in Colonia Zacamil, Mejicanos. He was the president of the non-governmental organization Human Rights Commission of El Salvador (CDHES).

Herbert Ernesto Anaya Sanabria (1954 – October 26, 1987) was the president of the NGO Human Rights Commission of El Salvador (CDHES). He was assassinated on October 26, 1987, close to his home. Herbert Anaya was the fourth leader of CDHES to be murdered or "disappeared" during the 1980s. None of these cases were satisfactorily resolved. Early in 1993 Anaya's son was shot and wounded when armed men tried to intercept the car of his widow Mirna Perla de Anaya.

== Life ==
He was born in San Salvador in 1954. During his law study in the 1970s Herbert Anaya joined the student organisation AGEUS and was later one of the founders of the human rights organisation CDHES. In the 1980s he became active in the Farabundo Martí National Liberation Front (FMLN). In addition he worked for the committee of the families of persons murdered or disappeared. On May 26, 1986, he was arrested, along with Reynaldo Blanco (future president of the CDHES) by members of the Treasury Police jailed in the La Esperanza prison for nine months where he was interrogated and tortured. In jail Anaya worked on a human rights record which included testimonies of 430 of the 432 inmates describing methods of torture applied to them. The 160 pages record and a video showing torture signs were smuggled outside and sent to the Marin County Interfaith Task Force. The human rights abuse record is now housed at the Archives at the University of Colorado at Boulder Libraries. On February 2, 1987, Anaya was released as part of an exchange of prisoners.

Herbert Anaya was accused at that time by both the US government and the Salvadoran army of being a leader of the FMLN guerrilla organisation. They claimed that the CDHES was a "rebel propaganda arm", although no conclusive evidence was brought forward.

After his release, Anaya began to denounce human rights violations and asserted that the death squads were directly under the orders of the military. These allegations were proved right by human rights NGOs.

== Assassination ==
On October 26, 1987, Herbert Anaya was assassinated in the parking lot outside his home in the Zacamil district in El Salvador. According to witnesses' testimonies three men were involved in the murder. Ballistic tests later showed that six shots were fired from the same weapon. His death caused strong reactions within El Salvador as well as abroad and led to demonstrations, on the following days, in the capital. His body was left in protest in front of the US embassy, and then carried to the high command of the armed forces.

National and international human rights groups and civilian associations expressed their concern. The National Union of Salvadoran Workers issued a statement according to which "Those who bear sole responsibility for this crime are José Napoleón Duarte [the Salvadoran head of state], the US embassy ... and the high command of the armed forces". The West German government, the West German Social Democratic Party and the French government requested that Duarte clarify "the circumstances of the crime." UN secretary general Javier Pérez de Cuéllar, Americas Watch, Amnesty International and other human rights groups also protested against this crime.

In protest against Anaya's assassination, the FMLN and the Revolutionary Democratic Front (FDR) also suspended negotiations with the Duarte government on October 29, 1987. The same day, Reni Roldán resigned from the Commission of National Reconciliation, stating that "The murder of Anaya, the disappearance of university labour leader Salvador Ubau, and other events do not seem to be isolated incidents. They are all part of an institutionalised pattern of conduct."

=== Investigations ===
In its report the Commission on the Truth for El Salvador, established as part of the El Salvador peace agreement, stated that it could not establish for sure whether the death squads, the Salvadoran Army or the FMLN was responsible for Anaya's death.

Allegations were made at the time that the Ejército Revolucionario del Pueblo (ERP) had organized Anaya's assassination. Himself a member of ERP, Anaya favoured a peaceful solution, which might have clashed with others leaders' plans. Two months later police arrested ERP member Jorge Alberto Miranda Arévalo. Arévalo initially stated that he was involved in the plot as the look-out, a statement he later retracted saying that he was put under psychological pressure and sleep deprivation. Although he could not be identified by eyewitnesses, he was found guilty in 1991 and sentenced to the maximum penalty of 30 years in prison. However, the International Truth Commission stated that Arévalo's basic rights were violated in the trial and his treatment by the police.

However, these allegations against ERP were rejected by Anaya's wife as well as by the CDHES. On the other hand, Anaya's colleagues reported that he had received a number of direct and indirect threats from the Salvadoran government throughout 1987. Additionally, El Salvador's National Guard in March 1987 arrested Anaya's father who was interrogated about his son's activities.

== See also ==
- History of El Salvador
