= Valdecarros =

- Municipality
- Flag Coat of arms

- Location in Salamanca
- Coordinates: 40°46′11″N 5°25′21″W
- Country: Spain
- Autonomous community: Castile and León
- Province: Salamanca
- Comarca: Tierra de Alba

Government
  - Mayor: Leire Hernández Revuelta (PSOE (Spain))

Area
  - Total: 27 km^{2} (10 sq mi)
- Elevation: 887 m (2,910 ft)

Population (2025-01-01)
  - Total: 296
  - Density: 11/km^{2} (28/sq mi)
- Time zone: UTC+1 (CET)
  - Summer (DST): UTC+2 (CEST)
- Postal code: 37881

Valdecarros is a municipality located in the province of Salamanca, Castile and León, Spain. As of 2016 the municipality has a population of 363 inhabitants.
