= Pedraza de Alba =

- Municipality
- Coat of arms

- Location in Salamanca
- Coordinates: 40°45′15″N 5°22′30″W
- Country: Spain
- Autonomous community: Castile and León
- Province: Salamanca
- Comarca: Tierra de Alba

Government
  - Mayor: David Mateos Sánchez

Area
  - Total: 23 km^{2} (8.9 sq mi)
- Elevation: 897 m (2,943 ft)

Population (2025-01-01)
  - Total: 214
  - Density: 9.3/km^{2} (24/sq mi)
- Time zone: UTC+1 (CET)
  - Summer (DST): UTC+2 (CEST)
- Postal code: 37882

Pedraza de Alba is a municipality located in the province of Salamanca, Castile and León, Spain. As of 2016 the municipality has a population of 248 inhabitants.
