= Terradillos =

- Municipality
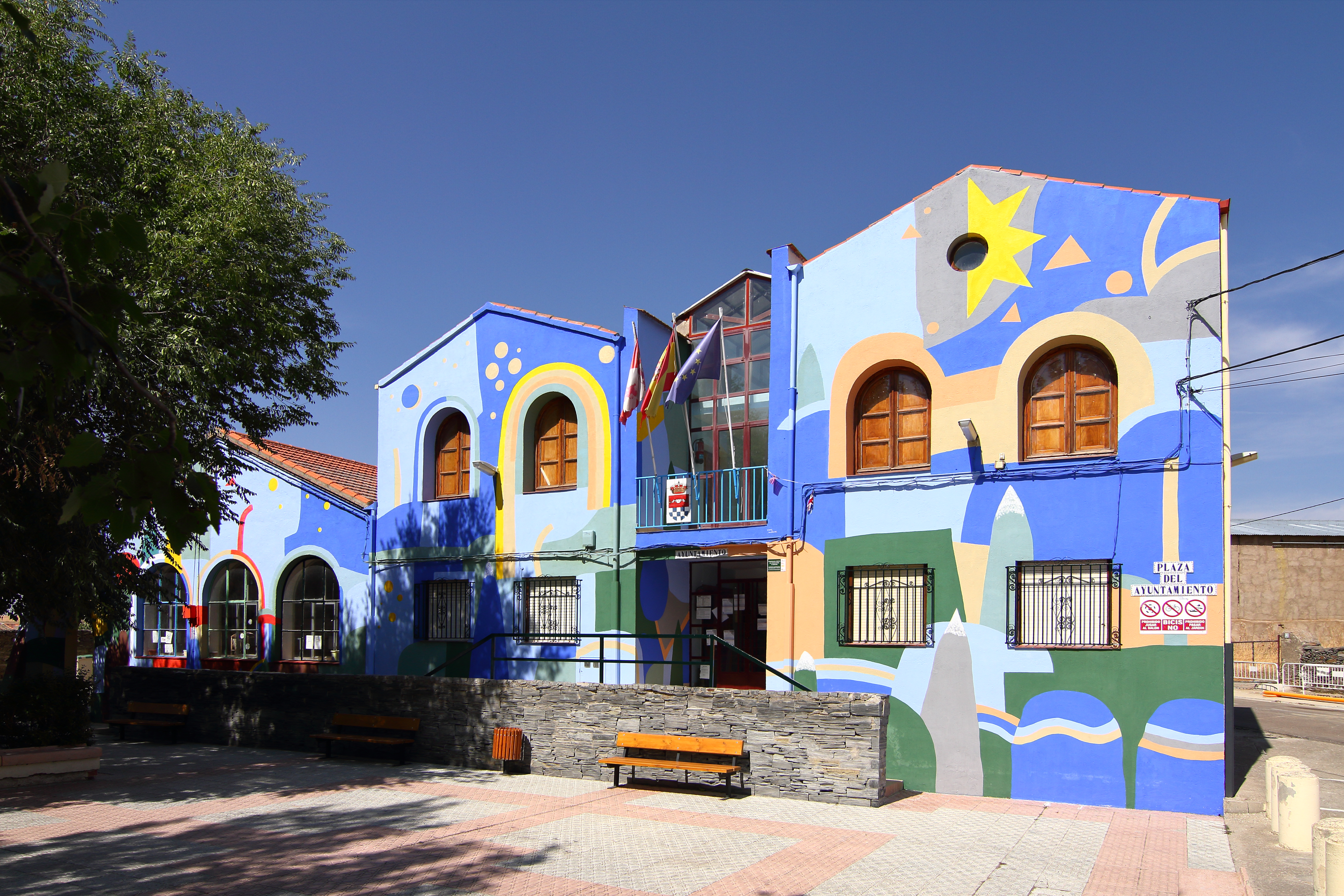

- Coat of arms

- Location in Salamanca
- Coordinates: 40°50′23″N 5°32′33″W
- Country: Spain
- Autonomous community: Castile and León
- Province: Salamanca
- Comarca: Tierra de Alba

Government
  - Mayor: Alejandro Álvarez García (United Left)

Area
  - Total: 33 km^{2} (13 sq mi)
- Elevation: 879 m (2,884 ft)

Population (2025-01-01)
  - Total: 3,314
  - Density: 100/km^{2} (260/sq mi)
- Time zone: UTC+1 (CET)
  - Summer (DST): UTC+2 (CEST)
- Postal code: 37882

Terradillos is a town and municipality in the province of Salamanca, Spain. In ancient Roman times it was called Viminatium (not to be confused with the Serbian city of Viminacium).
