= Thirumangalam, Tiruchirappalli district =

Thirumangalam
- village
- Location in Tamil Nadu, India Thirumangalam (India)
- Country: India
- State: Tamil Nadu
- District: Trichy

Languages
  - Official: Tamil
- Time zone: UTC+5:30 (IST)

Thirumangalam is a village near Lalgudi in Tiruchirappalli district in the Indian state of Tamil Nadu. Thirumangalam is located near Lalgudi, Tiruchirappalli. The town is situated on the banks of a distributary of the river Cauvery near Trichy.
