= Pedraza de Campos =

Coordinates: 41°59′N 4°44′W

- municipality
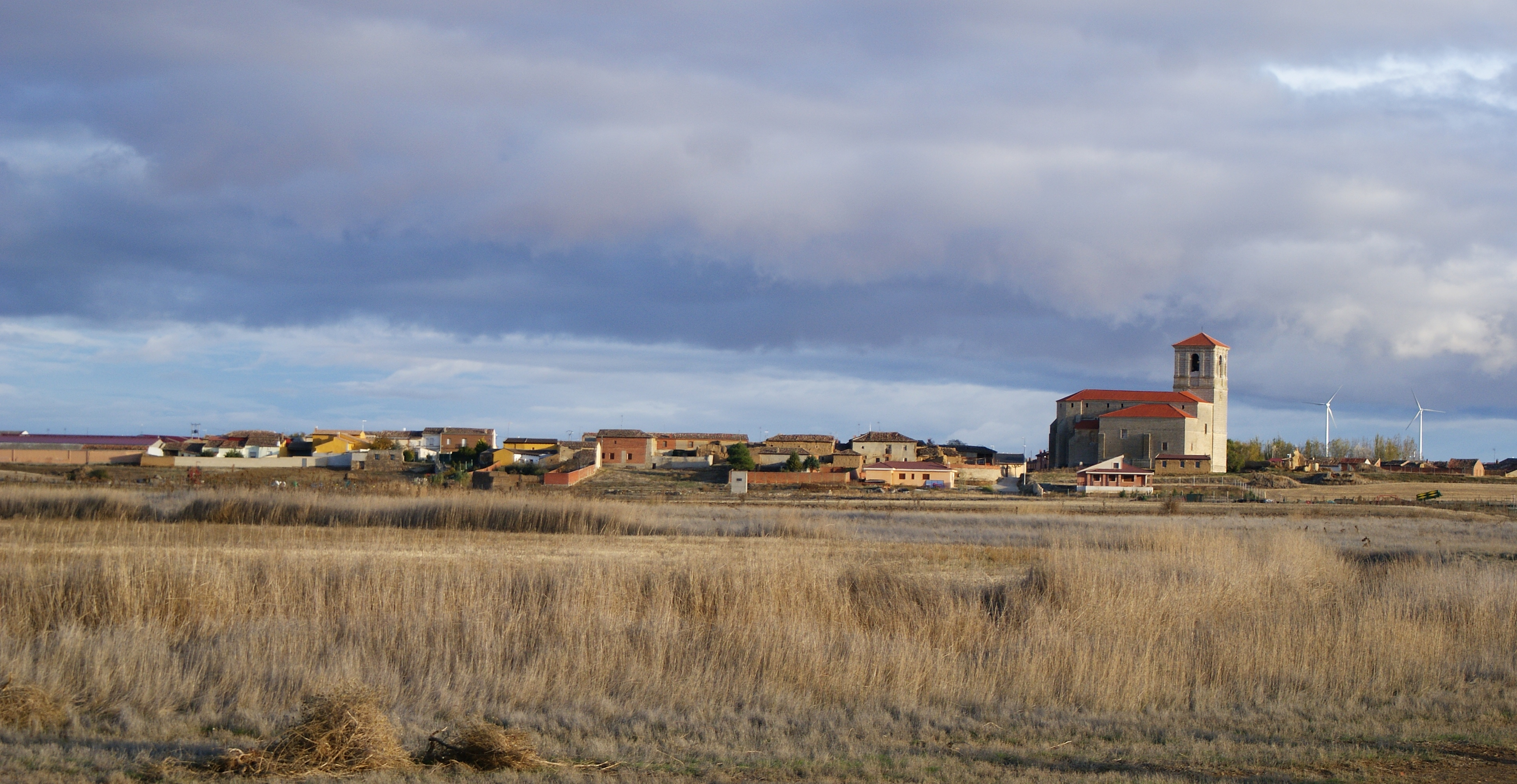
- Interactive map of Pedraza de Campos
- Country: Spain
- Autonomous community: Castile and León
- Province: Palencia
- Municipality: Pedraza de Campos

Area
  - Total: 32 km^{2} (12 sq mi)

Population (2025-01-01)
  - Total: 73
  - Density: 2.3/km^{2} (5.9/sq mi)
- Time zone: UTC+1 (CET)
  - Summer (DST): UTC+2 (CEST)
- Website: Official website

Pedraza de Campos is a municipality located in the province of Palencia, Castile and León, Spain. According to the 2004 census (INE), the municipality had a population of 115 inhabitants.
