= General Anaya =

General Anaya may refer to:

- Pedro María de Anaya (1794–1854), military officer and two-time interim president of Mexico
- General Anaya (former administrative division) (fl. 1928–1941), a former delegación of the Mexican Federal District.
- General Anaya metro station (Mexico City)
- General Anaya metro station (Monterrey)
