= Anaya de Alba =

- Municipality
- Location in Salamanca

- Location in Spain
- Coordinates: 40°43′43″N 5°29′32″W
- Country: Spain
- Autonomous community: Castile and León
- Province: Salamanca
- Comarca: Tierra de Alba

Government
  - Mayor: Antonio Hernández López (PSOE)

Area
  - Total: 37 km^{2} (14 sq mi)
- Elevation: 879 m (2,884 ft)

Population (2025-01-01)
  - Total: 190
  - Density: 5.1/km^{2} (13/sq mi)
- Time zone: UTC+1 (CET)
  - Summer (DST): UTC+2 (CEST)
- Postal code: 37863

Anaya de Alba is a village and municipality in the province of Salamanca, western Spain, part of the autonomous community of Castile-Leon. It is located 32 kilometres (20 mi) from the city of Salamanca and has a population of 271 people. The municipality covers an area of 37 km^{2} (14 sq mi).

The village lies 879 metres (2,884 ft) above sea level.

The postal code is 37863.

Anaya de Alba is the birthplace of the Filipino-Spanish family "Vicente", whose descendant Bruno Vicente migrated to the Philippines in the early 1900s. The Vicente's are prominent land owners in Negros Oriental, Philippines.
