= Anaya, Segovia =

Anaya
- Municipality
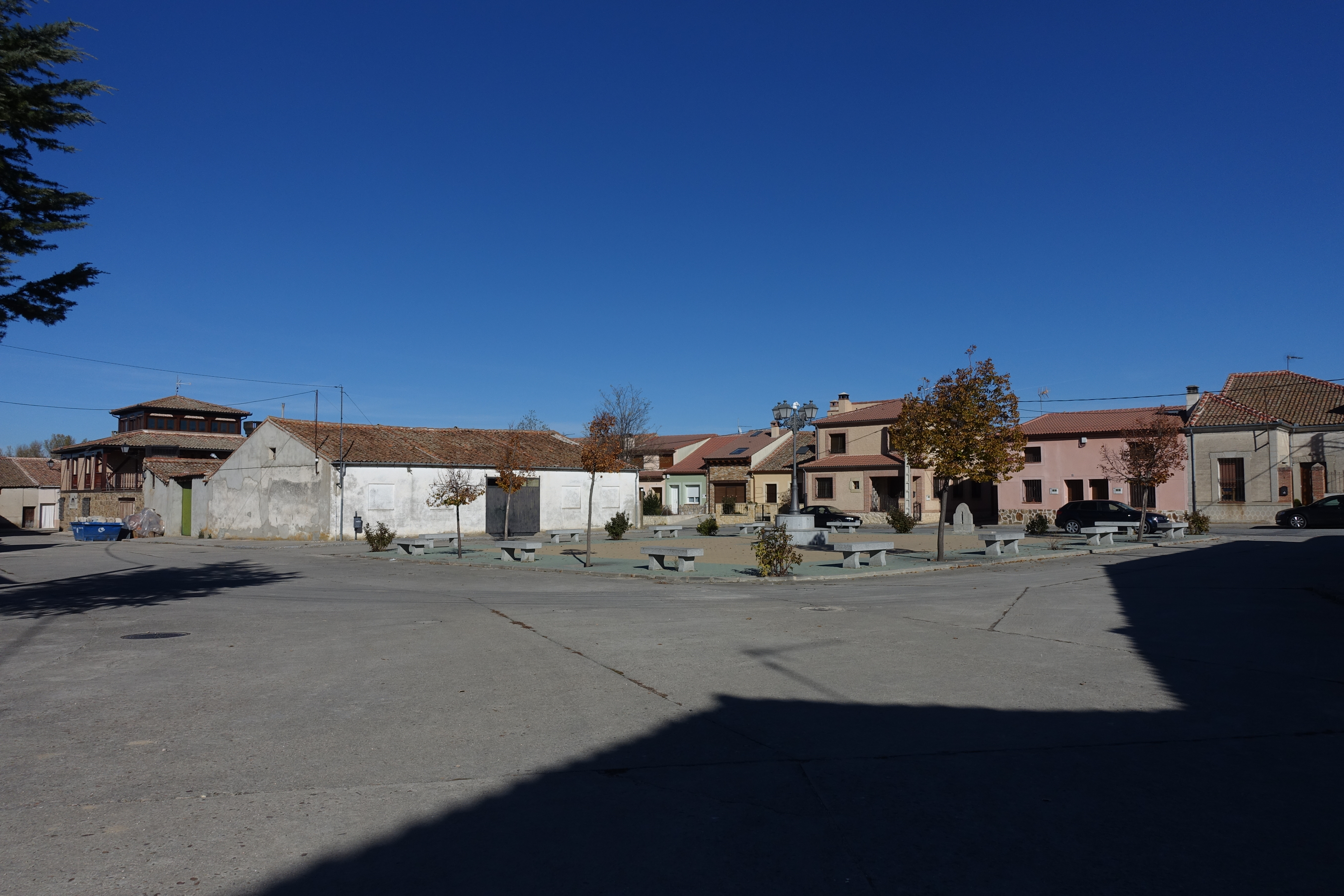
- Anaya Main Square

- Flag Coat of arms

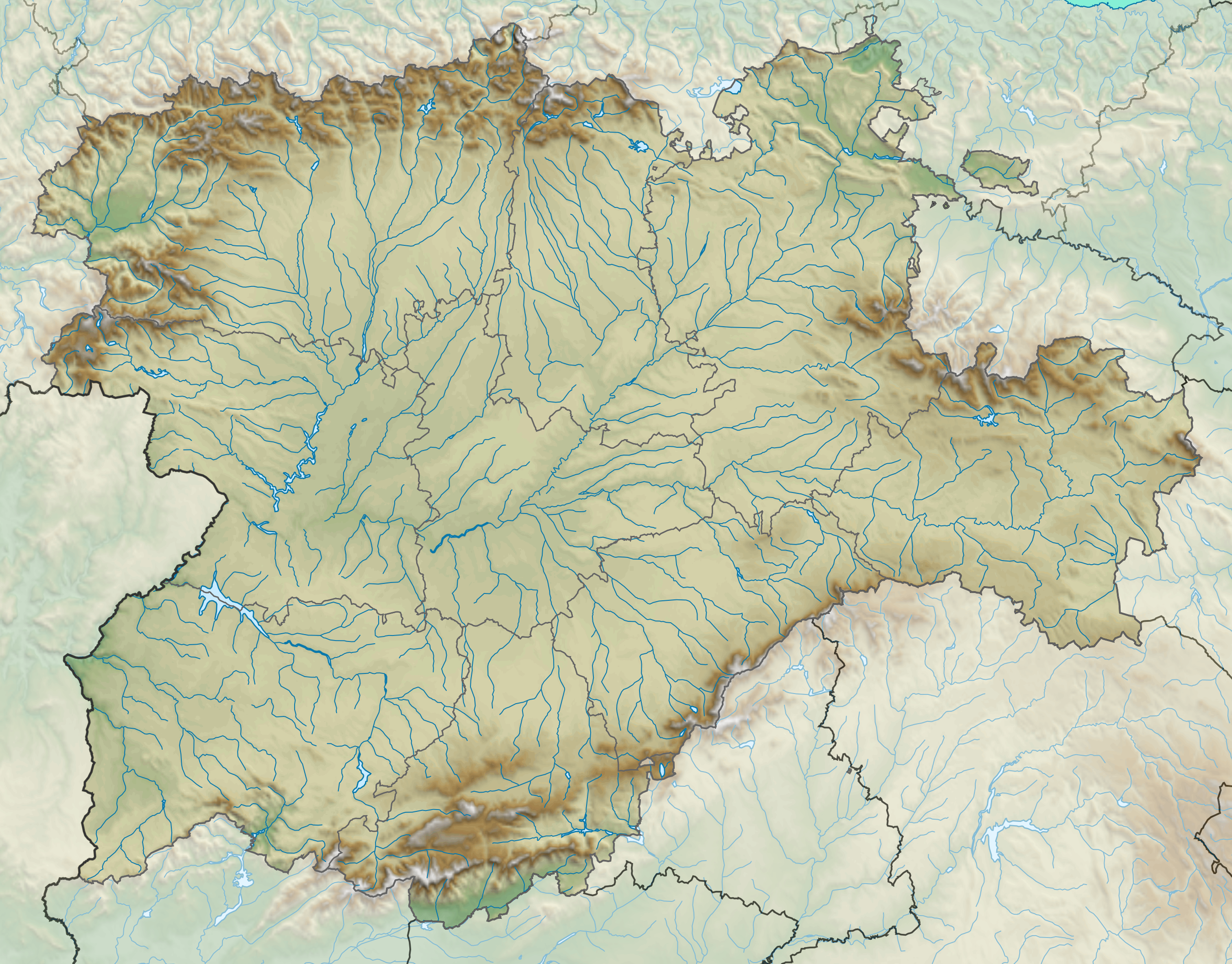
- Location within Castile and León Location within Spain
- Coordinates: 40°59′29″N 4°18′31″W
- Country: Spain
- Autonomous community: Castile and León
- Province: Segovia

Area
  - Total: 15.19 km^{2} (5.86 sq mi)
- Elevation: 889 m (2,917 ft)

Population (2025-01-01)
  - Total: 111
  - Density: 7.31/km^{2} (18.9/sq mi)
- Time zone: UTC+1 (CET)
  - Summer (DST): UTC+2 (CEST)
- Website: Official website

Anaya is a municipality located in the province of Segovia, Castile and León, Spain. According to the 2004 census (INE), the municipality had a population of 136 inhabitants.

== Geography ==
The village lies in the vicinity of the river Moros, a tributary of the Eresma.

== Folklore ==
"La Sierra Vieja" is a children festival celebrated in the third Thursday of Lent in the village, involving boys and girls going around the village with scapulars asking folks for money or eggs.

A version of a ballad of the romancero vulgar, La infanticida, recorded in the village in 1983, features jews portraying devils.
