= List of Soul Eater chapters =

The cover of the first volume of the Soul Eater manga released by Gangan Comics on June 22, 2004, in Japan

Soul Eater is a Japanese manga series written and illustrated by Atsushi Okubo. The series follows the adventures of three students at a school called the Death Weapon Meister Academy (or DWMA for short), known as meisters, who use demon weapon companions with human and weapon forms. These meisters, Maka Albarn, Black Star, and Death the Kid, seek to turn their weapons, Soul Eater, Tsubaki, and the Thompson sisters respectively, into "death scythes" for Lord Death, the Grim Reaper and head of the DWMA, by having their weapons consume the souls of 99 evil humans and one witch.

The manga initially began as three separate one-shots serialized between June 24, 2003, and November 26, 2003, in two manga magazines published by Square Enix. The first one-shot was published in the summer 2003 special edition of Gangan Powered, the second following in the autumn 2003 special edition of the same magazine, and the third serialized in Gangan Wing. The manga started regular serialization in Square Enix's Monthly Shōnen Gangan magazine on May 12, 2004. The first tankōbon was released by Square Enix under their Gangan Comics imprint on June 22, 2004, in Japan; as of December 12, 2013, 25 volumes have been released. The series is published in English by Yen Press, and is serialized in Yen Press' Yen Plus manga anthology magazine. The first issue of Yen Plus was released on July 29, 2008.

== Volumes ==
| No. | Original release date | Original ISBN | English release date | English ISBN |
|---|---|---|---|---|
| 01 | June 22, 2004 | 978-4-7575-1223-8 | October 27, 2009 | 978-0-7595-3001-0 |
"Soul Eater" (ソウル=イーター, Sōru Ītā); "Black Star" (ブラック☆スター, Burakku Sutā); "Death the Kid" (デス・ザ・キッド, Desu za Kiddo); 001. "Remedial Lesson (Part 1)" (補習授業（前編）, Hoshū Jugyō (zenpen))
Maka Albarn and her weapon partner, Soul Eater, have gathered ninety-nine evil human souls and manage to collect the soul of Blair, whom they initially assume to be a witch, only to discover she is actually a magical cat, forcing them to start over. Black Star and his partner, Tsubaki Nakatsukasa, track down the witch Angela and her bodyguard, Mifune, whose soul is equivalent to ninety-nine human souls; however, they decide not to kill them upon discovering that Angela is a helpless child. Shinigami's son, Death the Kid, and his partners, Liz and Patty Thompson, go soul-hunting in an Egyptian pyramid filled with mummies, but all the souls they collect are confiscated after they accidentally destroy the pyramid. To make up for the souls they have failed to collect, Maka, Soul, Black Star, and Tsubaki take a remedial class where they fight an undead DWMA teacher, Sid Barrett.
| 02 | November 22, 2004 | 978-4-7575-1322-8 | February 23, 2010 | 978-0-7595-3048-5 |
002. "Remedial Lesson (Part 2)" (補習授業（後編）, Hoshū Jugyō (kōhen)); 003. "The 'New Student' and 'Soul Observation'" ("新入生"と"魂観察", "Shinnyūsei" to "Tamashii Kansatsu"); 004. "Demon Sword (Part 1)" (魔剣（前編）, Maken (zenpen)); 005. "Demon Sword (Part 2)" (魔剣（後編）, Maken (kōhen))
Maka, Soul, Black Star, and Tsubaki are overwhelmed in battle against Franken Stein, the most powerful meister to ever graduate from the DWMA, who reveals that the fight had been set up for their remedial class and goes on to teach at the DWMA. Kid decides to enroll at the DWMA and displays his immense power in battle against Soul and Black Star, who are incompatible with each other. Maka and Soul encounter Crona, the wielder of the demon sword Ragnarok, who absorbs human souls under orders of the witch Medusa and risks transforming into a kishin, a demon god that could plunge the world into chaos and madness. Soul is severely injured while protecting Maka in battle against Crona, who is defeated by Stein and Spirit, Maka's father.
| 03 | April 22, 2005 | 978-4-7575-1413-3 | June 15, 2010 | 978-0-7595-3064-5 |
006. "Holy Sword" (聖剣, Seiken); 007. "Uncanny Sword (Part 1)" (妖刀（前編）, Yōtō (zenpen)); 008. "Uncanny Sword (Part 2)" (妖刀（後編）, Yōtō (kōhen)); 009. "Persevering Soul" (がんばれる魂, Ganbareru Tamashii)
Black Star and Kid search for the holy sword Excalibur, hoping to obtain its legendary power, but are unable to put up with his immense egotism and abandon him. Black Star and Tsubaki are sent after the Uncanny Sword Masamune, a demon sword and Tsubaki's brother who is attacking humans. Tsubaki defeats her brother, absorbing his soul and gaining his powers. Hoping to overcome her dependence on Soul, Maka becomes willing to face her fears of Soul being in danger. Meanwhile, Medusa poses as a nurse at the DWMA to experiment on black blood, a madness-inducing liquid she has placed in Crona, which Soul was infected with during their fight. Her experiments raise the ire of two witches, Eruka Frog and Mizune, but Medusa kills Mizune and threatens Eruka into serving her.
| 04 | August 22, 2005 | 978-4-7575-1505-5 | October 26, 2010 | 978-0-7595-3127-7 |
010. "The Experiment (Part 1)" (実験（前編）, Jikken (zenpen)); 011. "The Experiment (Part 2)" (実験（後編）, Jikken (kōhen)); 012. "Ultimate Written Exam" (超筆記試験, Chō-hikkishiken); 013. "Black Dragon (Part 1)" (黒龍（前編）, Kokuryū (zenpen)); 014. "Black Dragon (Part 2)" (黒龍（後編）, Kokuryū (kōhen))
Medusa enlists the immortal werewolf Free to test the black blood in Soul. Maka and Soul defeat Free, but Maka discovers that she has been infected with Soul's black blood as well. The DWMA students have a major examination which Soul, Black Star, and Kid fail miserably, though Maka scores the highest in the class. Kid, Liz, and Patty are dispatched to investigate the living ship Niddhogg, which has been stealing human souls. Crona and Ragnarok arrive and absorb all the souls on board the ship before retreating despite Kid's best efforts, but not before warning Kid about one of the DWMA's darkest secrets.
| 05 | December 22, 2005 | 978-4-7575-1584-0 | February 22, 2011 | 978-0-316-07107-9 |
015. "The Anniversary Celebration" (創立記念前夜祭, Sōritsu Kinen Zen'yasai); 016. "A Fight to the Death at the Anniversary Celebration (Part 1)" (前夜祭の死闘（その1）, Zen'yasai no Shitō (sono ichi)); 017. "A Fight to the Death at the Anniversary Celebration (Part 2)" (前夜祭の死闘（その2）, Zen'yasai no Shitō (sono ni)); 018. "A Fight to the Death at the Anniversary Celebration (Part 3)" (前夜祭の死闘（その3）, Zen'yasai no Shitō (sono san))
DWMA holds a celebration on the anniversary of its founding. Medusa uses this time to stage an attack with Crona, Free, Eruka, and Mizune's sisters to execute her ultimate plan: to use the black blood to awaken the original kishin, Asura, who is sleeping beneath the DWMA building. Maka, Black Star, Kid, Stein, and their partners manage to escape before Shinigami and the other DWMA students are imprisoned within a pocket dimension by Free. Stein battles Medusa with Spirit to let the others stop her cohorts from awakening the kishin. Black Star and Kid track down Free and Eruka while Maka stays behind to engage Crona. To defeat Crona, Maka and Soul draw upon the power of the black blood, which drives Maka insane.
| 06 | April 22, 2006 | 978-4-7575-1671-7 | June 28, 2011 | 978-0-316-07109-3 |
019. "A Fight to the Death at the Anniversary Celebration (Part 4)" (前夜祭の死闘（その4）, Zen'yasai no Shitō (sono yon)); 020. "A Fight to the Death at the Anniversary Celebration (Part 5)" (前夜祭の死闘（その5）, Zen'yasai no Shitō (sono go)); 021. "A Fight to the Death at the Anniversary Celebration (Part 6)" (前夜祭の死闘（その6）, Zen'yasai no Shitō (sono roku)); 022. "A Fight to the Death at the Anniversary Celebration (Part 7)" (前夜祭の死闘（その7）, Zen'yasai no Shitō (sono nana))
Maka manages to determine the source of Crona's childhood trauma before Soul helps her regain her sanity. Maka then comforts Crona, who surrenders. Meanwhile, Stein and Medusa's fight leads to a deadlock, while Black Star and Kid arrive to confront Free and Eruka in Asura's chamber. The combatants all hallucinate as a result of the kishin's madness wavelength, which distracts Black Star and allows Eruka to successfully inject Asura with black blood, awakening him. Medusa gloats her victory, only to be seemingly killed by Stein. Asura encounters Shinigami, who has escaped his own confines and fights Asura unarmed. However, Shinigami fails to defeat Asura, who escapes.
| 07 | September 22, 2006 | 978-4-7575-1774-5 | October 25, 2011 | 978-0-316-07110-9 |
023. "Normalcy" (日常, Nichijō); 024. "The Trial Enrollment (Part 1)" (体験入閣（前編）, Taiken Nyūkaku (zenpen)); 025. "The Trial Enrollment (Part 2)" (体験入閣（中篇）, Taiken Nyūkaku (chūhen)); 026. "The Trial Enrollment (Part 3)" (体験入閣（後編）, Taiken Nyūkaku (kōhen)); 027. "The Bodyguard (Part 1)" (用心棒（前編）, Yōjinbō (zenpen))
Shinigami summons the death scythes Justin Law, Marie Mjolnir, and Azusa Yumi to DWMA for their help in finding Asura. Crona becomes a trial student at DWMA and is sent on a mission to the Czech Republic with Maka and Soul to find a golem that has been attacking people. They discover that the golem contains the soul of the witch Arachne, who resurfaces after 800 years of hiding and paralyzes Maka. Justin saves Maka and Crona, and Arachne retreats to regroup with her worldwide organization, Arachnophobia, which wages war against DWMA. Black Star infiltrates an Arachnophobia research facility to avenge Maka and encounters Mifune, who is now a member of Arachnophobia.
| 08 | January 22, 2007 | 978-4-7575-1922-0 | February 28, 2012 | 978-0-316-07112-3 |
028. "The Bodyguard (Part 2)" (用心棒（後編）, Yōjinbō (kōhen)); 029. "Snake" (蛇, Hebi); 030. "The Reunion Express (Part 1)" (再会特急（前編）, Saikai Tokkyū (zenpen)); 031. "The Reunion Express (Part 2)" (再会特急（後編）, Saikai Tokkyū (kōhen))
Mifune defeats Black Star, and Sid destroys the research facility. As Mifune retreats, he gives Black Star and Tsubaki advice on how to control the power of the Uncanny Sword. Medusa, who survived her battle with Stein by hiding in the body of a snake, takes over the body of a young girl in Death City to use as a host. She has her minions infiltrate Arachnophobia, planning to topple her sister Arachne's organization. Kid is dispatched to find a demon tool in a train that has never stopped running for 100 years. He finds the train, with an Arachnophobia agent and a Mizune sister joining the hunt for the tool. Kid manages to find the tool, and finds his father's signature on it alongside that of Eibon, the tool's creator.
| 09 | May 22, 2007 | 978-4-7575-2015-8 | May 29, 2012 | 978-0-316-07113-0 |
032. "The Corner of the Room" (部屋の隅, Heya no Sumi); Bonus. "The Legend of the Holy Sword" (聖剣伝説, Seiken Densetsu); 033. "Retaliation Class" (対抗授業, Taikō Jūgyō); 034. "'BREW'—The Tempest (Part 1)" ("BREW"波乱（その1）, "BREW" Haran (sono ichi)); 035. "'BREW'—The Tempest (Part 2)" ("BREW"波乱（その2）, "BREW" Haran (sono ni))
Kid attempts to research who Eibon is and finds that the book on Eibon was taken by someone he assumes to be Medusa. Meanwhile, Crona begins to adapt well to life at DWMA, but is confronted by Medusa, who asks Crona to spy on DWMA. Crona places an item into Marie, Stein's new partner, to increase Stein's insanity. To counter the threat from Arachnophobia, Stein trains Maka, Black Star, and Kid in duel arts, a form of combat in which the three synchronize their souls to fight better in tandem. Although Maka and Black Star are initially incompatible, they overcome their differences for the sake of their team. Shinigami dispatches DWMA's forces to find Brew, one of the most powerful demon tools created by Eibon. While the battle rages on the island where Brew is located, Maka, Black Star, and Kid attempt to find Brew, and encounter Mosquito, one of Arachne's foremost servants.
| 10 | October 22, 2007 | 978-4-7575-2132-2 | August 21, 2012 | 978-0-316-07114-7 |
036. "'BREW'—The Tempest (Part 3)" ("BREW" 波乱（その3）, "BREW" Haran (sono san)); 037. "'BREW'—The Tempest (Part 4)" ("BREW" 波乱（その4）, "BREW" Haran (sono yon)); 038. "Internal Investigation (Part 1)" (内部調査（前編）, Naibu Chōsa (zenpen)); 039. "Internal Investigation (Part 2)" (内部調査（後編）, Naibu Chōsa (kōhen))
Although Maka, Black Star, and Kid successfully fight off Mosquito, they are forced to retreat to keep their bodies from being destroyed by the vortex of energy where Brew is hidden. However, Mosquito unknowingly returns to Arachnophobia with a replica of Brew, as Medusa sent Mizune to retrieve Brew during the battle. Fearing that there is a mole within DWMA, Shinigami summons Joe Buttataki to investigate. Joe suspects the mole to be Stein, who has been experiencing fits of madness due to Asura's awakening. Meanwhile, Maka accidentally overhears Crona talking with Eruka, realizing that Crona is a spy. At DWMA, Black Star deliberately instigates a fight with Kid to confront his doubts due to his recent string of defeats, and Kid defeats him. Elsewhere, Joe is attacked and killed by an unknown assailant, and Spirit and Sid come to Stein's house to arrest him.
| 11 | March 22, 2008 | 978-4-7575-2239-8 | November 20, 2012 | 978-0-316-07115-4 |
040. "Resolve" (決意, Ketsui); 041. "The Clown (Part 1)" (道化師（前編）, Dōkeshi (zenpen)); 042. "The Clown (Part 2)" (道化師（中篇）, Dōkeshi (chūhen)); 043. "The Clown (Part 3)" (道化師（後編）, Dōkeshi (kōhen)); 044. "The Choice" (選択, Sentaku)
Spirit, Sid, and Marie tell Stein their belief that he is not Joe's killer, and Spirit instructs Stein to leave Death City with Marie to find the real culprit. Meanwhile, Black Star leaves Death City with Tsubaki, who suggests going to her parents' home. Eruka arrives at Crona's room to instruct Crona to leave DWMA. The following day, Maka is dispatched with Kid to investigate a demonic factory. Inside the factory, Maka encounters a clown that is a product of the madness Asura created throughout the world. The clown attempts to overwhelm Maka with madness, but Soul helps her in finding the courage to overcome her fear, vastly increasing her power and allowing her to defeat the clown. At the academy, two witch agents are found; meister Kim Diehl, a secret witch, flees DWMA away with her partner, Jacqueline O. Lantern Dupré, and the two are accepted into Arachnophobia. Shinigami then learns that the witches' locations were disclosed by Medusa, who offers a deal to reveal the location of Arachne's headquarters.
| 12 | June 21, 2008 | 978-4-7575-2300-5 | January 22, 2013 | 978-0-316-07293-9 |
045. "The Deal" (取り引き, Torihiki); 046. "Operation Capture Baba Yaga Castle (Part 1)" (ババ・ヤガーの城攻略作戦（その1）, Baba Yagā no Shiro Kōryaku Sakusen (sono ichi)); 047. "Operation Capture Baba Yaga Castle (Part 2)" (ババ・ヤガーの城攻略作戦（その2）, Baba Yagā no Shiro Kōryaku Sakusen (sono ni)); 048. "Operation Capture Baba Yaga Castle (Part 3)" (ババ・ヤガーの城攻略作戦（その3）, Baba Yagā no Shiro Kōryaku Sakusen (sono san))
Medusa offers to lead a strike team into Baba Yaga's castle, Arachne's headquarters, and gives Shinigami the real Brew as a sign of good faith. Shinigami agrees and Maka, Kid, Ox Ford, and Kilik Rung are assigned to the team. With Medusa's aid, the team manages to evade the perimeter defenses around Baba Yaga's castle and they successfully infiltrate it. Medusa explains that there are eight locks to Arachne's throne room, and that the group will have to separate to destroy them. Ox attempts to search for Kim, whom he has feelings for, in the castle. He finds her manipulated by a machine that lowers morality, and she stabs him, claiming her allegiance is to Arachnophobia. The alarms in Baba Yaga's castle begin to activate as Black Star arrives, running straight through all the perimeter's defenses.
| 13 | October 22, 2008 | 978-4-7575-2400-2 | March 26, 2013 | 978-0-316-23057-5 |
049. "Operation Capture Baba Yaga Castle (Part 4)" (ババ・ヤガーの城攻略作戦（その4）, Baba Yagā no Shiro Kōryaku Sakusen (sono yon)); 050. "Operation Capture Baba Yaga Castle (Part 5)" (ババ・ヤガーの城攻略作戦（その5）, Baba Yagā no Shiro Kōryaku Sakusen (sono go)); 051. "Operation Capture Baba Yaga Castle (Part 6)" (ババ・ヤガーの城攻略作戦（その6）, Baba Yagā no Shiro Kōryaku Sakusen (sono roku)); 052. "Operation Capture Baba Yaga Castle (Part 7)" (ババ・ヤガーの城攻略作戦（その7）, Baba Yagā no Shiro Kōryaku Sakusen (sono nana))
Black Star begins to fight Mifune, and due to the training he had at Tsubaki's home, he is able to fully use Tsubaki's demon sword ability and fights Mifune evenly. Inside the castle, Ox battles Kim, and attempts to convince her of his devotion to her. He manages to overcome the morality machine by ripping off his own cherished hair spikes, a physical feature of his that Kim dislikes; Kim is moved by this act and relents. Elsewhere, Kid and Free encounter Mosquito, who transforms into his strongest form to fight both of them.
| 14 | March 21, 2009 | 978-4-7575-2509-2 | May 28, 2013 | 978-0-316-23192-3 |
053. "Operation Capture Baba Yaga Castle (Part 8)" (ババ・ヤガーの城攻略作戦（その8）, Baba Yagā no Shiro Kōryaku Sakusen (sono hachi)); 054. "Operation Capture Baba Yaga Castle (Part 9)" (ババ・ヤガーの城攻略作戦（その9）, Baba Yagā no Shiro Kōryaku Sakusen (sono kyū)); 055. "Operation Capture Baba Yaga Castle (Part 10)" (ババ・ヤガーの城攻略作戦（その10）, Baba Yagā no Shiro Kōryaku Sakusen (sono jū)); 056. "Operation Capture Baba Yaga Castle (Part 11)" (ババ・ヤガーの城攻略作戦（その11）, Baba Yagā no Shiro Kōryaku Sakusen (sono jūichi)); 057. "Operation Capture Baba Yaga Castle (Part 12)" (ババ・ヤガーの城攻略作戦（その12）, Baba Yagā no Shiro Kōryaku Sakusen (sono jūni))
While fighting Mosquito, the demon tool Brew Kid is holding activates, enabling him to hold off Mosquito's attacks before the enemy gets away. Elsewhere in the castle, Kilik fights alongside Ox with their weapons, and the final two castle locks are destroyed. Arachne attacks Maka's group with a mental attack, but they soon break through it. Maka, Soul, and Medusa enter Arachne's inner lair and discover her lifeless body. Mosquito fights with Noah, but is killed quickly, and Kid is sucked into Eibon's book as Liz and Patty look on in horror. Outside the castle, Black Star continues his fight with Mifune until he finally defeats him.
| 15 | September 18, 2009 | 978-4-7575-2678-5 | July 23, 2013 | 978-0-316-23490-0 |
058. "Operation Capture Baba Yaga Castle (Part 13)" (ババ・ヤガーの城攻略作戦（その13）, Baba Yagā no Shiro Kōryaku Sakusen (sono jūsan)); 059. "Operation Capture Baba Yaga Castle (Part 14)" (ババ・ヤガーの城攻略作戦（その14）, Baba Yagā no Shiro Kōryaku Sakusen (sono jūyon)); 060. "Operation Capture Baba Yaga Castle (Part 15)" (ババ・ヤガーの城攻略作戦（その15）, Baba Yagā no Shiro Kōryaku Sakusen (sono jūgo)); 061. "Beginning By Wrapping Things Up" (とりあえずまとめ、と始まり｡, Toriaezu Matome, to Hajimari.); 062. "Startup" (始動, Shidō)
Arachne, assuming a disembodied, spider-like form, immediately incapacitates Maka, Soul, and Medusa. Arachne uses her madness wavelength to drive everyone at the facility insane, though Maka and Soul counter with Soul's soothing music transmitted through Maka's soul wavelength to everyone else via Arachne's own spider webs. Maka and Soul use the "Demon Hunter" technique to kill Arachne and claim her soul. Medusa takes control of Arachne's discarded body and flees the castle after the monkey meister Enrique and his death scythe partner Tezca Tlipoca arrive from South America. With the mission over, everyone returns to Death City to recover from the ordeal. Stein and Marie confront Justin Law, the culprit who killed Joe Buttataki, but he is able to get away with the help of a magical artifact. After that, Shinigami creates a new DWMA elite squad called Spartoi, and Soul, after reobtaining 100 souls, finally becomes a death scythe by eating Arachne's soul.
| 16 | February 22, 2010 | 978-4-7575-2790-4 | September 24, 2013 | 978-0-316-24431-2 |
063. "Gonna Be An Angel" (天使になるもん, Tenshi ni Narumon); 064. "Readiness" (心構え, Kokorogamae); 065. "Black Wings vs. White Wings" (黒羽 VS 白羽, Kurohane VS Shirohane); 066. "The Witch's Research (Part 1)" (魔女の研究（前編）, Majo no Kenkyū (zenpen)); 067. "The Witch's Research (Part 2)" (魔女の研究（後編）, Majo no Kenkyū (kōhen))
While testing her new flying ability made available through Soul's powers as a death scythe, Maka learns that she is now considered to be a valuable asset to her enemies and will be hunted, which is made clear when she is attacked by Noah's servant Gopher, whom she manages to defeat. Later, Kilik, Kim, Liz, and Patty retrieve Medusa's research notes in her old laboratory, briefly encountering and fighting off a black clown manufactured by Medusa. Black Star, meanwhile, seeks out Medusa's hideout and encounters Crona.
| 17 | July 22, 2010 | 978-4-7575-2930-4 | November 19, 2013 | 978-0-316-24432-9 |
068. "The Abyss of Despair, the Uncleanliness, and the Darkness" (捺落、不浄、暗黒, Naraku, Fujō, Ankoku); 069. "Love Triangle" (三角関係, Sankaku Kankei); 070. "The Business Lunch" (出張, Shutchō); 071. "The Great Old One" (旧支配者, Kyū Shihaisha); 072. "Salvage (Part 1)" (サルベージ（その1）, Sarubēji (sono ichi))
Black Star discovers during his fight with Crona that Crona's memories of Maka and DWMA have been erased by Medusa. The fight is cut short when Medusa is attacked by Justin and orders Eruka and Mizune to help Crona escape. They succeed, but Eruka is captured by Black Star. At DWMA, Soul finds that dozens of other students are requesting him to become their partner now that he is a death scythe. Maka tries to pay the matter no mind until she notices a single girl who frequently stares at them from afar. Shinigami organizes a plan to rescue Kid from the Book of Eibon with the help of witches Kim, Risa, Arisa, and Eruka, who open a portal into the book for the members of Spartoí to enter. The group begins navigating the book's seven chapters thanks to the Index's help, each based on the seven deadly sins, starting with the first chapter "Lust", where the group members switch genders. Meanwhile, deep within the book, Kid encounters a black amorphous creature referring to itself as one of the "Great Old Ones", which consumes him and begins to slowly drive him to madness.
| 18 | November 22, 2010 | 978-4-7575-3056-0 | January 21, 2014 | 978-0-316-36899-5 |
073. "Salvage (Part 2)" (サルベージ（その2）, Sarubēji (sono ni)); 074. "Salvage (Part 3)" (サルベージ（その3）, Sarubēji (sono san)); 075. "Salvage (Part 4)" (サルベージ（その4）, Sarubēji (sono yon)); 076. "Salvage (Part 5)" (サルベージ（その5）, Sarubēji (sono go))
The Spartoi keep their way through the Book of Eibon looking for Kid who was consumed in Madness by the Great Old One. The Index informs the Spartoi that the more they spend their journey inside the book gender-switched, the more perverted they become. After passing by the Lust and Gluttony chapters, Maka and Soul, who find their own genders again, are separated from the Spartoi and are trapped in the Envy chapter- where the previous staring girl tortures Maka's mind, making her reconsider her partnership with Soul- and the Sloth chapter- where they have to fight Giriko while the rest were in the Wrath and Pride chapters facing a guest. Thinking Maka could defeat Giriko with the music of Soul's piano, he comes back in a new female body form thanks to the power of BREW. Meanwhile in the Greed chapter, the Spartoi find their genders again with the exception of Tsubaki, who was the last one to do so. Black Star finds himself face to face with Kid.
| 19 | March 22, 2011 | 978-4-7575-3163-5 | March 25, 2014 | 978-0-316-40694-9 |
077. "Salvage (Part 6)" (サルベージ（その6）, Sarubēji (sono roku)); 078. "Salvage (Part 7)" (サルベージ（その7）, Sarubēji (sono nana)); 079. "Salvage (Part 8)" (サルベージ（その8）, Sarubēji (sono hachi)); 080. "Salvage (Part 9)" (サルベージ（その9）, Sarubēji (sono kyū)); 081. "Salvage (Part 10)" (サルベージ（その10）, Sarubēji (sono jū))
Maka and Soul have difficulties to fight Giriko and when everything was supposed to be over, Giriko's soul is starting to self-destroy because it couldn't hold back 800 years of bloodlust and finally disappears. The fight between Black Star and Death the Kid is getting more violent, they all are consumed by the Madness of the Black Mass and want to find out each other who's right and wrong about force. After they answer to the question of the true force, The Black Mass sends the Spartoi squad back to the real world while the DWMA is fighting Noah and his minions. Kid, who declares wanting to create a world of harmony and balance, defeats and destroys Noah with two of the Lines of Sanzu's power. Gopher retreats flying away with the book of Eibon and BREW while Justin is in a familiar place surrounded by Clowns where it seems to be the Kishin's hideout.
| 20 | September 22, 2011 | 978-4-7575-3364-6 | May 27, 2014 | 978-0-316-40695-6 |
082. "The Whereabouts" (行方, Yukue); 083. "Mad Blood" (狂血, Kyōketsu); 084. "Recovery" (リカバリー, Rikabarī); 085. "Pursuit" (追跡, Tsuiseki); 086. "Hellfire" (業火, Gōka); 087. "Just a Simple Story about Killing a Person" (ただ人を殺す単純な物語, Tada Hito o Korosu Tanjun na Monogatari)
This is the reunion's time between Shinigami and Kid, and also the time for another step in the Index's plan. Kid confesses to his father that the Noah he fought wasn't really human at all because he just had the personification of Greed. The Index wants to teach through the power of knowledge, but according to Shinigami, this power can create another form of madness, and so the Index creates another Noah with the personification of Wrath. Meanwhile, Maka and Soul are called in Moscow, Crona has been found murdering Tsar Pushka, the death scythe in charge of Eastern Europe, and his partner with the power of mad blood. Feeling the power of madness, Soul's wound opens up, awakes his true power and lose his own reason against Maka. Inside his soul, the little ogre tries again to submit him to the power of madness but Soul still refuses and finds his own self back. At the same time, Crona keeps murdering people with the power of mad blood under Medusa's orders. In a moment of mother-child relationship, Crona loses himself and ends up stabbing his own mother. Meanwhile, Justin is found by Tezca and seems to have found out where the Kishin is hidden. Tezca, who fights Justin by trying to resonate him about what's right and wrong, is killed by Justin.
| 21 | February 22, 2012 | 978-4-7575-3501-5 | July 22, 2014 | 978-0-316-40696-3 |
088. "Hunt" (ハント, Hanto); 089. "Look Up and You'll See Him" (見上げれば奴がいる, Miagereba Kare ga Mierudarou); 090. "Moon" (月, Tsuki); 091. "War on the Moon (Part 1)" (月面戦争（その1）, Getsumen Sensō (sono ichi)); 092. "War on the Moon (Part 2)" (月面戦争（その2）, Getsumen Sensō (sono ni))
Kid is going back to the Lost Island where he finds Eibon who seemed to be the real one since the beginning. Eibon is making Kid doubtful about Shinigami because he thinks that his own ideas of Order can be the source of madness. Back to the DWMA after a sky-whaling mission, the Spartoi squad learns that Crona's death penalty has been added to Shinigami's list and nothing can be reversed. Maka uses her own Soul Perception Ability combined with Soul's death scythe power to find Crona through the world. And instead of looking for Crona, her ability led her to the source of madness, the Kishin is hidden on the moon. The DWMA, with the death scythes remaining, Death the Kid, and two of the NOT class, is preparing to its most important mission: landing on the moon and get rid of the Kishin where Justin and his army of Clowns are waiting for them, while the Spartoi is going to Italy to find Crona at the place where Maka met him for the first time. The war on the moon begins and everything is turning into a battlefield.
| 22 | July 22, 2012 | 978-4-7575-3659-3 | September 23, 2014 | 978-0-316-40697-0 |
093. "War on the Moon (Part 3)" (月面戦争（その3）, Getsumen Sensō (sono san)); 094. "War on the Moon (Part 4)" (月面戦争（その4）, Getsumen Sensō (sono yon)); 095. "War on the Moon (Part 5)" (月面戦争（その5）, Getsumen Sensō (sono go)); 096. "War on the Moon (Part 6)" (月面戦争（その6）, Getsumen Sensō (sono roku)); 097. "War on the Moon (Part 7)" (月面戦争（その7）, Getsumen Sensō (sono nana))
While the DWMA's forces fight back against the Clown's army, Stein uses the power of madness and manages to fight equally with Justin and his own madness until he has the facility to win against him, Kid is struggling against a small group of Clowns who has the ability to regenerate itself thanks to the Kishin's Madness Wavelength and Sid with Akane and Clay from the DWMA's Central Intelligence Agency are looking for the Kishin's hideout inside the moon's nose where await Noah and Gopher. Meanwhile, Maka who is determined to bring Crona back finally finds him but since he murdered his own mother he just wants to paint the world in black and insanity by getting the Kishin and so flies to the moon. The Spartoi squad is decided to disobey Shinigami's orders and they have no choice but to join the others on the moon.
| 23 | December 22, 2012 | 978-4-7575-3812-2 | November 18, 2014 | 978-0-316-40698-7 |
098. "Witch Trial" (魔女裁判, Majo Saiban); 099. "Full Speed Ahead!" (最高速で前へ!, Sai kōsoku de mae e!); 100. "To the Moon" (月へ, Tsuki e); 101. "War on the Moon II (Part 1)" (第2次月面戦争（その1）, Dai Ni-ji Getsumen Sensō (sono ichi)); 102. "War on the Moon II (Part 2)" (第2次月面戦争（その2）, Dai Ni-ji Getsumen Sensō (sono ni))
Seeing the DWMA's forces fighting in vain against the Clowns, Shinigami orders to Kid and his squad to retreat from the moon for an instant. He announces that while Kid was fighting, he was negotiating with the witches for lending a help thanks to their Soul Protect ability which can prevent from the Kishin's Madness Wavelength and stop the Clowns' healing. With Kim, Eruka, Free, Lisa and Arisa, Kid is going to Witches' Realm for pursuing the negotiations. Meanwhile, Maka and Black Star finally arrive on the moon and join to the battle against the Clowns before Kid's return with the witches. When he comes back, he is alone this time but hopes that they will come. While the DWMA's forces are trying to contain the Clowns as long as they can, the witches appear and have decided to help DWMA, their nemesis. Thanks to the Witches' Soul Protect ability, the DWMA's forces can land back on the moon and fight back the Clowns. Maka and the others beat them and all is remaining is the Kishin but what's worrying is that Crona has already landed on the moon too.
| 24 | June 22, 2013 | 978-4-7575-3979-2 | January 20, 2015 | 978-0-316-37793-5 |
103. "War on the Moon II (Part 3)" (第2次月面戦争（その3）, Dai Ni-ji Getsumen Sensō (sono san)); 104. "The Dark Side of the Moon I" (ザダークサイドオブザムーン I, Za Dāku Saido obu za Mūn I); 105. "The Dark Side of the Moon II" (ザダークサイドオブザムーン II, Za Dāku Saido obu za Mūn II); 106. "The Dark Side of the Moon III" (ザダークサイドオブザムーン III, Za Dāku Saido obu za Mūn III); 107. "The Dark Side of the Moon IV" (ザダークサイドオブザムーン IV, Za Dāku Saido obu za Mūn IV)
| 25 | December 12, 2013 | 978-4-7575-4163-4 | March 24, 2015 | 978-0-316-37795-9 |
108. "The Dark Side of the Moon V" (ザダークサイドオブザムーン V, Za Dāku Saido bu za Mūn V); 109. "The Dark Side of the Moon VI" (ザダークサイドオブザムーン VI, Za Dāku Saido obu za Mūn VI); 110. "The Dark Side of the Moon VII" (ザダークサイドオブザムーン VII, Za Dāku Saido obu za Mūn VII); 111. "The Dark Side of the Moon VIII" (ザダークサイドオブザムーン VIII, Za Dāku Saido obu za Mūn VIII); 112. "The Dark Side of the Moon IX" (ザダークサイドオブザムーン IX, Za Dāku Saido obu za Mūn IX); 113. "A Sound Soul Dwells in a Sound Mind and a Sound Body" (健全なる魂は、健全なる精神と、健全なる肉体に宿る。, Kenzen'naru Tamashī wa, Kenzen'naru Seishin to, Kenzen'naru Nikutai ni Yadoru)

== See also ==
- List of Soul Eater characters
- List of Soul Eater episodes
