= List of Soul Eater episodes =

Soul Eater
- Japanese cover art for the first Soul Eater DVD volume as released by Media Factory
- No. of episodes: 51

Release
- Original network: TV Tokyo
- Original release: April 7, 2008 – March 30, 2009

Soul Eater is a Japanese anime television series based on Atsushi Ohkubo's manga series of the same name. The anime is directed by Takuya Igarashi and produced by Bones, Aniplex, Dentsu, Media Factory, and TV Tokyo. Bones and Aniplex were responsible for the animation and music production, respectively. The story follows Maka Albarn, a "meister" of the Death Weapon Meister Academy (DWMA), and her living weapon, Soul Eater, as she seeks to make the latter into a "death scythe" through absorbing the souls of evil humans. After episode 38, the anime deviated from the manga it was based on which lead to an anime original ending not found in the source material.

The anime series aired 51 episodes from April 7, 2008, to March 30, 2009, on TV Tokyo. The episodes also aired at later dates on TV Aichi, TV Hokkaido, TV Osaka, TV Setouchi, and TVQ Kyushu Broadcasting. It was released on DVD in thirteen separate compilations from August 22, 2008, to August 25, 2009. The anime was licensed by Funimation and was released in four half-season DVD box sets from February 9 to July 27, 2010. There are also two Blu-ray box sets that were released in Japan, containing both Japanese and English audio tracks; the first was released on January 26, 2011, and the second was released on March 23, 2011. Reruns aired on TV Tokyo under the title Soul Eater: Repeat Show from September 30, 2010, to March 31, 2011. The English dub of the series aired on Adult Swim's Toonami programming block starting on February 17, 2013.

Six pieces of theme music were used for the original broadcasting; two opening themes and four closing themes. The opening theme for the first 30 episodes is "Resonance" by T.M.Revolution. The second opening theme from episode 31 onwards is "Papermoon" by Tommy Heavenly^{6}. The first closing theme is "I Wanna Be" by Stance Punks for the first 13 episodes and the final episode; the second closing theme is "Style" by Kana Nishino for episodes 14 through 26; the third closing theme is "Bakusō Yume Uta" (爆走夢歌) by Soul'd Out's Diggy-Mo from episode 27 through 39; the fourth closing theme, "Strength" by Abingdon Boys School, is used from episodes 40 to 50. Soul Eater: Repeat Show features two additional opening and closing themes. The first opening and closing themes for the first 12 episodes are "Counter Identity" by Unison Square Garden and "Ao no Kaori" (碧の香り) by Yui Makino. The second opening and closing themes from episode 13 onward are "Ai ga Hoshii yo" (愛がほしいよ) by Shion Tsuji and "Northern Lights" by How Merry Marry.

== Episodes ==
No.	Title	Directed by	Written by	Storyboarded by	Original release date	English air date
1	"Resonance of the Soul – Will Soul Eater Become a Death Scythe?"; Transliteration: "Tamashii no Kyōmei: Sōru Ītā, Desu Saizu ni Naru?" (Japanese: 魂の共鳴 〜ソウル=イーター、デスサイズになる?〜)	Takuya Igarashi	Akatsuki Yamatoya	Takuya Igarashi	April 7, 2008	February 17, 2013
Meister Maka Albarn and her weapon partner Soul Eater have collected 99 kishin souls, souls of weapon meisters and death scythes who have eaten human souls, causing their souls to become corrupt and turn into what they call kishin, and only need the soul of a witch to turn Soul into a death scythe. The two seek out the witch Blair, who frequently gets the better of them and tries to seduce Soul. During a battle, Soul tricks Blair into thinking he wants to abandon Maka and become her weapon, allowing Maka to take her soul. Unfortunately, nothing happens when Soul eats it, as Blair turns out to be a magical cat rather than a witch and had merely lost one of her nine souls. As penalty for this mistake, Lord Death confiscates all the souls they've collected, forcing them to start over.
2	"I Am the Star! The Big Man Is Showing Up Here?"; Transliteration: "Ore koso Sutā da! Mottomo Biggu na Otoko, Koko ni Arawaru?" (Japanese: 俺こそスターだ! 〜最もビッグな男、ここに現る?〜)	Takefumi Anzai	Akatsuki Yamatoya	Sōichi Masui	April 14, 2008	February 24, 2013
Following a failed attempt at collecting the 99 souls of mobster Al Capone and his men, assassin Black Star and his weapon Tsubaki track them down to the residence of the witch Angela, only to find they have all been killed by Angela's bodyguard Mifune. Black Star fights Mifune, but is easily beaten due to his lack of skill as an assassin. When Mifune insults him, however, Black Star accuses him of trying to upstage him and successfully utilizes a surprise attack that defeats him. However, Black Star decides not to kill him or Angela once he discovers the witch to be a helpless young girl. In addition, he declines collecting the mobsters' souls since he himself did not defeat them.
3	"The Perfect Boy – Death the Kid's Magnificent Mission?"; Transliteration: "Kanpeki naru Shōnen: Desu za Kiddo no Karei naru Misshon?" (Japanese: 完璧なる少年 〜デス･ザ･キッドの華麗なるミッション?〜)	Mitsuhiro Yoneda	Akatsuki Yamatoya	Michio Fukuda	April 21, 2008	March 3, 2013
Lord Death's son, Death the Kid, decides to go soul-hunting in the Egyptian Pyramid of Anubis where a witch is creating mummies to resurrect an evil pharaoh. However, Kid becomes easily distracted due to his obsession with symmetry, forcing his weapons, Liz and Patty Thompson, to collect the mummies' souls on their own. Upon encountering the pharaoh, Kid is unable to kill him as he attacks from his perfectly symmetrical sarcophagus. But when the pharaoh emerges and reveals his true, unaligned self, Kid relentlessly destroys him. Unfortunately, the pyramid is wrecked in the attack, and Kid is forced to surrender the souls he collected as punishment.
4	"Engage the Witch Hunter! A Remedial Lesson in the Graveyard?"; Transliteration: "Majogari Hatsudō! Dokidoki Hakaba no Hoshū Jugyō?" (Japanese: 魔女狩り発動! 〜ドキドキ墓場の補習授業?〜)	Ikurō Satō	Akatsuki Yamatoya	Takuya Igarashi	April 28, 2008	March 10, 2013
To make up for the souls they failed to collect, Maka, Soul, Black Star, and Tsubaki take a remedial class together under the threat of expulsion if they fail. They are sent to a graveyard to fight Sid Barrett, their former teacher and a powerful meister who had been turned into a zombie. Maka and Soul attempt to perform their Soul Resonance, "Witch Hunter", but are unable to control it properly, leaving Black Star to subdue Sid with Tsubaki's chain. With Sid captured, Lord Death reveals the one who turned Sid into a zombie to be Dr. Franken Stein, the most powerful meister to ever graduate from Death Weapon Meister Academy.
5	"Shape of the Soul – Enter the Ultimate Meister Stein?"; Transliteration: "Tamashii no Katachi: Saikyō Shokunin Shutain Tōjō?" (Japanese: 魂のかたち 〜最強職人シュタイン登場?〜)	Shin Matsuo	Akatsuki Yamatoya	Sōichi Masui	May 5, 2008	March 24, 2013
Maka, Soul, Black Star, and Tsubaki face off against Dr. Stein, who quickly proves his skill in battle and nearly kills Black Star. Following Black Star's defeat, Maka catches a sight of Stein's immense soul with her soul perception ability, and despairs over how his power vastly surpasses her own. Soul convinces her to keep fighting, and the two perform their Soul Resonance perfectly, but it isn't enough to defeat Stein. Afterward, Stein reveals that the entire fight had been set up by Lord Death for the remedial class, which they pass. Stein later becomes a new teacher at the DWMA, much to the dismay of the students.
6	"The New Student – Kid's First Day at the Academy, Will It Be an Entrance to Remember?"; Transliteration: "Uwasa no Shinnyūsei! Omoide Ippai, Kiddo no Shibusen Hatsu Tōkō?" (Japanese: 噂の新入生! 〜想い出いっぱい、キッドの死武専初登校?〜)	Takefumi Anzai	Akatsuki Yamatoya	Takefumi Anzai, Takuya Igarashi	May 12, 2008	March 31, 2013
Death the Kid and the Thompson sisters enroll at the DWMA, and Soul and Black Star team up to fight them on their first day of school. The fight proves to be very one-sided, as Kid's extraordinary battle abilities are more than a match for Soul and Black Star, who are unable to synchronize their soul wavelengths with each other. Just when it appears Soul and Black Star are left utterly defeated by Kid's destructive Soul Resonance "Death Cannon", Kid passes out from an earlier attack Soul made that ended up clipping Kid's hair, ruining its symmetry and earning Soul and Black Star a come-from-behind victory.
7	"Black-blooded Terror – There's a Weapon inside Crona?"; Transliteration: "Koketsu no Kyōfu: Kurona no Naka ni Buki ga Iru?" (Japanese: 黒血の恐怖 〜クロナの中に武器がいる?〜)	Daisuke Chiba	Akatsuki Yamatoya	Shin Matsuo	May 19, 2008	April 7, 2013
Maka and Soul go to Italy for a supplementary lesson to collect another evil soul. Once they finish their mission, Maka senses strong soul activity coming from a church and decides to investigate. She and Soul encounter Crona, meister of the Demon Sword Ragnarok, who resides within Crona's body in the form of black blood. Crona's blood hardens to defend against all of Maka's attacks, while Maka is unable to guard Crona's attacks as Ragnarok can harm Soul in his weapon form. Afraid of hurting her partner, Maka attempts to flee, but Soul receives a severe blow to protect his meister.
8	"The Witch Medusa – Bearer of the Great Terrible Soul?"; Transliteration: "Majo Medyūsa: Ōinaru Waruki Tamashii o Motsu Mono?" (Japanese: 魔女メデューサ 〜大いなる凶き魂を持つ者?〜)	Ikurō Satō	Akatsuki Yamatoya	Michio Fukuda	May 26, 2008	April 14, 2013
Just when Maka and Soul are about to be killed by Crona, Stein and Maka's father, Death Scythe, appear to save them. The two have some trouble against Ragnarok's ability to transform every bit of Crona's blood into a weapon, but the two combine their strength and defeat Crona, who is then retrieved by the witch Medusa, Crona's master who had been observing the fight. Soul receives surgery for his injury and Stein tells Maka he will recover, but secretly confesses to Death Scythe that his body has been infected by Ragnarok's blood. Maka vows to become stronger and is comforted by the school nurse, unaware that she is in fact the witch who had attacked them.
9	"Legend of the Holy Sword – Kid and Black☆Star's Great Adventure?"; Transliteration: "Seiken Densetsu: Kiddo to Burakku Sutā no Daibōken?" (Japanese: 聖剣伝説 〜キッドとブラック☆スターの大冒険?〜)	Shingo Kaneko	Akatsuki Yamatoya	Sōichi Masui	June 2, 2008	April 21, 2013
Black Star and Kid learn about Excalibur, the Holy Sword whose legendary powers are said to surpass those of any other weapon and promise to bestow eternal glory to anyone who wields him. The two decide to search for Excalibur, but when they find him, they cannot stand his unbearable personality and end up abandoning him. Meanwhile, Death Scythe tries to cheer up Maka, who is still worried about Soul, and explains to her the origin of the Demon Sword, describing it as a weapon that has been devouring human souls and threatens to transform into a kishin, which is the reason the DWMA was founded to prevent from happening.
10	"The Enchanted Sword Masamune – Break the Soul Possession: A Heart Sings in the Rain?"; Transliteration: "Yōtō Masamune: Yabure Tamashii Hyōi, Ame ni Utau Kokoro?" (Japanese: 妖刀マサムネ 〜破れ魂憑依、雨に詠う心?〜)	Mitsuhiro Yoneda	Megumi Shimizu	Mitsuhiro Yoneda	June 9, 2008	April 28, 2013
Black Star and Tsubaki are assigned the task of tracking down and defeating Masamune, the Enchanted Sword, who has been devouring human souls. When they come to the village where the Enchanted Sword was last spotted, they are met with hostility from the villagers due to Black Star's heritage from the murderous Star Clan. Masamune later appears and possesses the body of a young boy, but Black Star breaks the boy free from the Enchanted Sword's control. At her own insistence, Tsubaki sends her soul into the Enchanted Sword to confront the soul of Masamune, who is in fact her older brother.
11	"Tsubaki, the Camellia Blossom – What Lies Beyond the Grief?"; Transliteration: "Tsubaki no Hana: Kanashimi o Koeta Saki ni Aru Mono?" (Japanese: 椿の花 〜悲しみを越えた先にあるもの?〜)	Shin Matsuo	Megumi Shimizu	Shin Matsuo	June 16, 2008	May 5, 2013
Tsubaki fights Masamune inside the Enchanted Sword, but is easily beaten. Masamune claims that Tsubaki's inheritance of their family's weapon forms led him to become evil, and is agonized by her pity of him. Just when Tsubaki's soul is about to be absorbed by Masamune, Black Star's voice reaches her, and she gains the will to defeat her brother, absorbing her very first soul in the process. Masamune's soul also grants Tsubaki the power to transform into the Enchanted Sword, though its power is too much for Black Star to handle.
12	"Courage That Beats Out Fear – Maka Albarn's Great Resolution?"; Transliteration: "Kyōfu ni Makenai Yūki: Maka Arubān no Ichidai Kesshin?" (Japanese: 恐怖に負けない勇気 〜マカ=アルバーンの一大決心?〜)	Yoshiyuki Asai	Akatsuki Yamatoya	Michio Fukuda	June 23, 2008	May 12, 2013
During a medical examination, Soul tells Medusa about a recurring dream in which he is goaded by the Little Demon to gain power through madness, followed by a nightmarish scene where he emerges from Maka's stomach, something Medusa deems to be an effect of Ragnarok's black blood. Maka, who remains troubled by Soul's injury, becomes determined to grow stronger and overcome the need to always be protected by Soul, but realizes that she must first face her fear of Soul being injured again. Meanwhile, Medusa's plans have raised the ire of two other witches, Eruka Frog and Mizune, who ambush and attempt to kill her. However, they realize that Medusa had placed magical snakes in their bodies when she had threatened them earlier, which kill Mizune. Eruka escapes with her life, but is tracked down by Medusa, who forces her to break into Witch Prison and release a prisoner who had stolen the eye of the witches' leader, whom Medusa intends to use for an experiment on Soul.
13	"The Man with the Magic Eye – Soul and Maka's Diverging Soul Wavelength?"; Transliteration: "Magan no Otoko: Sōru to Maka, Zure Yuku Tamashii no Hachō?" (Japanese: 魔眼の男 〜ソウルとマカ、ズレゆく魂の波長?〜)	Tensai Okamura	Akatsuki Yamatoya	Tensai Okamura	June 30, 2008	May 19, 2013
Maka and Soul undergo a special training session under Stein by pointing out each other's flaws under the effects of emotional stimulants, which leads to an argument between the two that threatens to permanently prevent their souls from resonating with each other. The two later take a supplementary class in London with Black Star and Tsubaki where they encounter Free, the immortal werewolf with the magic eye who Eruka had released from Witch Prison on Medusa's behalf. During their battle with Free on a suspension bridge, Black Star quickly passes out after using Tsubaki's Enchanted Sword mode, leaving Maka and Soul to fight alone. However, their soul wavelengths have already diverged to the point where Soul burns Maka's hands in his weapon form, making him unwieldy. The two begin to bicker again until Tsubaki persuades them to set their differences aside and accept each other, allowing their souls to resonate stronger than ever, though it causes the madness of Soul's black blood to intensify and risk consuming Maka's soul. Nevertheless, Maka is able to use her Witch Hunter against Free and, with aid from the newly revived Black Star, force him off the bridge. After the battle, Maka coughs up black blood into her hand.
14	"The Super Written Exam – Heart-Pounding, Reeling, and Restless. You're Kidding!?"; Transliteration: "Chō Hikkishiken: Dokidoki, Wakuwaku, Sowasowa, Usōn?" (Japanese: 超筆記試験 〜ドキドキ、ワクワク、ソワソワ、ウソーン?〜)	Ken Andō	Megumi Shimizu	Sōichi Masui	July 7, 2008	May 26, 2013
A big test is coming up, and the students in the DWMA are all studying for it, one way or another. Maka feels she has to be the best in class like her mother was, aiming to surpass her class rival Ox Ford. Black Star, after hopelessly trying to study, attempts to steal the answers to the test, being caught and punished by Stein in the process. Soul stocks his clothing with cheat sheets, but is quickly caught by Sid. Kid spends the entire exam writing his name, while Liz uses her time worrying about her appearance and Patty makes her test into an origami giraffe. Ultimately, Maka receives the top score of her class.
15	"The Soul Eating Black Dragon – Scaredy-cat Liz and Her Merry Friends?"; Transliteration: "Tamashii o Kū Kuroki Ryū: Okubyō Rizu to Yukai na Nakama-tachi?" (Japanese: 魂を食う黒き龍 〜臆病リズと愉快な仲間たち?〜)	Takefumi Anzai	Akatsuki Yamatoya	Takefumi Anzai, Takuya Igarashi	July 14, 2008	June 2, 2013
Kid and his weapons are investigating the Black Dragon, who have terrorized the Baltic Sea recently. The investigation leads them to a ship called Nidhogg, and an evil soul controlling it. As they find the evil soul, he sends Liz to the hull of the ship. There, she encounters human spirits who guide her to the deck of ship, meeting up with Kid and Patty. Liz and Patty transform into handguns to assist Kid in defeating the evil spirit. However, Crona arrives, slices off the head of the evil spirit, and summons Ragnarok, in preparation in for the upcoming battle.
16	"Fierce Battle Aboard the Ghost Ship – The Hell inside My Head?"; Transliteration: "Gekitō! Yūreisen: Boku no Atama no Naka no Jigoku?" (Japanese: 激闘! 幽霊船 〜ボクの頭の中の地獄?〜)	Daisuke Chiba	Akatsuki Yamatoya	Shin Matsuo	July 21, 2008	June 9, 2013
Kid continues to fight against Crona. Kid commences to attack recklessly at Crona, however Crona manages to survive. It is then that Crona uses Screaming Resonance, causing the ship to split in half. Kid begins to chase Crona across the sea, but he allows Crona to escape due to his obsession with symmetry. Meanwhile, Maka visits Medusa and explains to her about having coughed up black blood. In response, Medusa prescribed Maka a bag of pills that enhances the presence of black blood, though Maka is unaware of it. Stein also goes to see Medusa, being investigative about the pills, ending up convinced that she is a witch. Therefore, he sends Sid and Mila Naigus to Medusa's house to further investigate, finding out the truth about Medusa's evil scheme regarding the black blood. However, they are caught by Eruka, who was sent by Medusa to retrieve a briefcase containing black blood to carry out the plan. Kid returns to the DWMA and asks his father a question concerning the presence of kishin within the academy.
17	"Legend of the Holy Sword 2 – Wanna Go Drinking, Gambling, and Playing?"; Transliteration: "Seiken Densetsu Tsū: Nomu, Utsu, Kau, Ittoku?" (Japanese: 聖剣伝説2 〜飲む、打つ、買う、いっとく?〜)	Shingo Kaneko	Akatsuki Yamatoya	Shingo Kaneko	July 28, 2008	June 16, 2013
Ox is searching for the legendary sword Excalibur in order to write a report about him. However, upon meeting him, he discovers that the holy sword is not quite what he expected, forced to listen to the sword's one thousand provisions as well as his tales. Excalibur tells about his times when he was resided in a ghettoized city, when he performed at an opera house, when he incorrectly solved a crime case, when he accompanied an expedition into battle, and when he suffered a heartbreak from his first love. After Excalibur sings a song about himself, he finally gives Ox the opportunity to be his partner. However, Ox chooses to abandon him, negatively commenting on his personality.
18	"The Eve Party Nightmare – And so the Curtain Rises?"; Transliteration: "Zenyasai no Akumu: Soshite Maku wa Agatta?" (Japanese: 前夜祭の悪夢 〜そして幕は上がった?〜)	Ikurō Satō	Akatsuki Yamatoya	Tensai Okamura	August 4, 2008	June 23, 2013
The students and staff of the DWMA, including Lord Death himself, gather for a party celebrating the anniversary of the founding of the academy, giving Medusa the perfect chance to carry out her ultimate plan, as to revive the kishin sleeping beneath the academy. During the festivities, Stein confronts Medusa to ascertain her plot before Sid arrives to warn everyone about her trap. Medusa escapes to launch an assault throughout Death City with the assistance of her minions. Free traps everyone in his Independent Cube. Nevertheless, Sid allows Maka, Black Star, Kid, and their respective weapon partners, as well as Stein, to escape. The group of heroes follows Medusa underneath the city where they make their final preparations to stop her.
19	"The Underground Battle Commences – Break Through Medusa's Vector Arrow?"; Transliteration: "Kaishi, Chika Kōbōsen: Toppaseyo, Medyūsa no Bekutoru Arō?" (Japanese: 開始、地下攻防戦 〜突破せよ、メデューサのベクトルアロー?〜)	Yoshiyuki Asai	Akatsuki Yamatoya	Shinji Ishihira	August 11, 2008	June 30, 2013
The group of heroes is intercepted by Medusa, who unleashes her deadly Vector Arrows upon them. Maka, Black Star, and Kid make their way past the attack as Stein remains behind with Death Scythe to keep Medusa occupied. Kid goes further ahead to pursue Free and Eruka, who possess the black blood intended to awaken the kishin Asura. Black Star attempts to engage Crona in combat, but Maka, seeking revenge, convinces Black Star to catch up to and assist Kid while she fights Crona instead.
20	"The Black Blood Resonance Battle! – A Small Soul's Grand Struggle against Fear?"; Transliteration: "Koketsu no Kyōmei Sen! Kyōfu ni Hamukau Chiisana Tamashii no Taifuntō?" (Japanese: 黒血の共鳴戦! 〜恐怖に刃向かう小さな魂の大奮闘?〜)	Takefumi Anzai	Akatsuki Yamatoya	Michio Fukuda	August 18, 2008	July 7, 2013
The black blood in Soul proves to be dangerous for both him and Maka during their battle against Crona and Ragnarok. Before Maka can be defeated again, Soul confronts the Little Demon within himself and encounters Maka, whose consciousness was brought within Soul's by the demon in an attempt to claim both of their souls. Maka discusses with the reluctant Soul her intention to use the black blood's power and gain the same madness Crona has, hoping it will allow her to reach some understanding about Crona's wavelength. Soul relents and allows Maka to go slip into madness, promising to pull her out of it before it is too late.
21	"May My Soul Reach You – A Dry Heart inside Unbearable Isolation?"; Transliteration: "Todoke, Watashi no Tamashii: Kawaita Kokoro, Tamaranai Kodoku no Naka de...?" (Japanese: 届け、私の魂 〜乾いた心、たまらない孤独の中で…?〜)	Daisuke Chiba	Akatsuki Yamatoya	Sōichi Masui	August 25, 2008	July 14, 2013
Maka is overtaken by madness, allowing her to overpower Crona, but also to match her soul's wavelength with Crona's and see Crona's true will. Maka determines that the source behind Crona's madness is the neglect he suffered as a child under Medusa, causing Crona to withdraw from other people. Maka's contact with Crona's will throws Crona's soul into chaos, and Soul successfully pulls Maka from her madness. Maka then comforts Crona, purifying Crona's soul and befriending Crona.
22	"The Seal Shrine – The Immortal Man's Tricks?"; Transliteration: "Fūin no Yashiro: Fujimi no Otoko ga Shikaketa Karakuri?" (Japanese: 封印の社 〜不死身の男が仕掛けたからくり?〜)	Ken Andō	Megumi Shimizu	Tensai Okamura	September 1, 2008	July 21, 2013
Kid continues pursuing his targets until he suddenly encounters and engages Free, discovering that none of his own attacks are effective. Thanks to Black Star's timely intervention, however, Kid deduces that the Free they are fighting is actually an illusive Free projecting himself, as the actual Free is trying to buy enough time for him and Eruka to reach the shrine of the kishin. The two enter to find themselves immersed in the madness wavelength of the kishin, which causes them to hallucinate and nearly commit suicide, but they regain their senses in time to uncover the sleeping kishin.
23	"Dead or Alive – In the Rift between Revival and Dazzlement?"; Transliteration: "Deddo oa Araibu! Fukkatsu to Genkaku no Hazama de?" (Japanese: デッド オア アライブ! 〜復活と幻覚の狭間で?〜)	Shin Matsuo	Akatsuki Yamatoya	Shin Matsuo	September 8, 2008	July 28, 2013
Stein attempts to finish his battle with Medusa as quickly as possible while Medusa tries to draw it out, leading to a deadlock between the two. Meanwhile, Kid and Black Star finally reach Free and Eruka within the shrine of the kishin. Kid keeps Free at bay while Black Star chases down Eruka, who sticks a syringe of black blood into the sleeping kishin. In one final desperate attack, Black Star seemingly succeeds in destroying the syringe before the black blood is injected, only to discover his victory was a hallucination induced by the madness wavelength of the kishin. Stein cuts Medusa down as she expresses her joy, but it does nothing to prevent the kishin Asura from awakening.
24	"The Battle of the Gods – Death City on the Verge of Collapse?"; Transliteration: "Kamigami no Tatakai: Desu Shitī Hōkai no Kiki ni?" (Japanese: 神々の闘い 〜デス･シティー崩壊の危機に?〜)	Ikurō Satō	Akatsuki Yamatoya	Sōichi Masui	September 15, 2008	August 4, 2013
Maka, Black Star, and Kid are all incapacitated as Asura emerges from underground, but Lord Death, now free from the Independent Cube, confronts the newly awakened kishin. The two gods clash in an epic battle over Death City, but without a weapon, Lord Death unfortunately lacks the power necessary to properly fight Asura, who flees to spread his madness across the world. Lord Death orders various Death Scythes from around the world to be summoned to combat their new enemy, and Medusa seemingly dies after her battle with Stein. However, a snake can be seen emerging from the sewers.
25	"The Death Scythes Convene – Stop Dad's Staff Reassignment!?"; Transliteration: "Shōshū! Desu Saizusu: Fusege Papa no Jinjiidō!!?" (Japanese: 召集! デスサイズス 〜ふせげパパの人事異動!!?〜)	Mitsuhiro Yoneda	Akatsuki Yamatoya	Shinji Ishihira	September 22, 2008	August 11, 2013
Lord Death summons Death Scythe, Marie Mjolnir, Yumi Azusa, and Justin Law to discuss the new threat Asura poses, though Death Scythe fears it also means he will be demoted. Fortunately for Death Scythe, he remains as Lord Death's weapon while Marie becomes Stein's partner. Azusa searches for Asura while Justin remains on standby. After the meeting, Lord Death discusses his concerns with Death Scythe that Stein may be reverting to his old ways of insanity. Meanwhile, after surrendering to the DWMA, Crona is enrolled by Lord Death.
26	"The Exciting and Embarrassing Trial Enrollment! The DWMA New Lifestyle Support Fair Is Open?"; Transliteration: "Ureshi Hazukashi Taiken Nyūgaku! Shibusen Shinseikatsu Ōen Fea Kaisaichū?" (Japanese: 嬉し恥ずかし体験入学! 〜死武専新生活応援フェア開催中?〜)	Yoshiyuki Asai	Megumi Shimizu	Yoshiyuki Asai	September 29, 2008	August 18, 2013
Maka and Marie try to help Crona adapt to life as a DWMA student with little success. Later, Maka and Crona are assigned by Lord Death to investigate an incident in a Czech village involving a berserk golem. They encounter a man named Giriko, who turns out to be an insane weapon involved with the golem. Maka is nearly defeated by Giriko and the golem until Crona steps in to assist her.
27	"800 Years of Bloodlust – Advent of the Heretic Witch?"; Transliteration: "Happyuku-nen no Satsui: Itan no Majo Kōrin?" (Japanese: 800年の殺意 〜異端の魔女降臨?〜)	Toshinori Narita	Akatsuki Yamatoya	Toshinori Narita	October 6, 2008	August 25, 2013
As Maka and Crona struggle against Giriko and the golem, Stein discovers a certain heretic soul is inside the golem. The soul reveals herself as Arachne, a witch that was defeated by Lord Death in the past and had to hide herself in that same golem. As Giriko easily beats up Crona and is ready to finish them off, Justin appears and confronts him, leaving Arachne with no choice but to run away with Giriko. The golem stays behind to slow them down, but Justin easily finishes it off. A small man, named Mosquito, brings Arachne and Giriko into a small hideout, where she, along with all her minions, swears to beat Lord Death.
28	"The Sword God Rises – Does It Have a Sweet or Salty Taste?"; Transliteration: "Kenshi Tatsu: Aji wa Amai ka Shoppai ka?" (Japanese: 剣神立つ 〜味は甘いかしょっぱいか?〜)	Daisuke Chiba	Akatsuki Yamatoya	Michio Fukuda	October 13, 2008	September 8, 2013
While Maka is recovering, Sid receives a new report from Azusa about the location of one of Arachnophobia's labs, where a magic tool, which messes up people's morals, is being developed by Mosquito. While they lay out the plan to destroy it, Black Star follows them and also attacks the facility, and ends up facing Arachne's new bodyguard, Mifune. Even after using everything he has, he still cannot defeat Angela's bodyguard, but an ambush laid out by Sid, Naigus, and Azusa gives him the opportunity to escape. In the end, Black Star gives a piece of candy to Maka, one that Mifune gave him to console her.
29	"Medusa's Revival! A Spider and Snake's Fateful Reunion?"; Transliteration: "Fukkatsu no Medyūsa! Kumo to Hebi, Innen no Saikai?" (Japanese: 剣復活のメデューサ! 〜蜘蛛と蛇、因縁の再会?〜)	Ken Andō	Megumi Shimizu	Kunihiko Ikuhara	October 20, 2008	September 15, 2013
A little girl, named Rachel, is taken over by Medusa's snake. She starts to act strange, and eventually leaves her house, much to her mother's despair. Medusa, in her new child form, arrives at Baba Yaga's Castle, the domain of Arachne. However, she is rejected by Arachne, Giriko, and Mosquito. She leaves the castle with a disguised Eruka, swearing to take something she left over at Death City. Meanwhile, Stein is determined to teach his students about duel arts, where they will be able to figure out how to resonate as a team. He volunteers Maka and Soul, Ox and Harvar de Éclair, and Black Star without Tsubaki, only to see them fail at the attempt.
30	"The Red Hot Runaway Express – A Magic Tool Left Behind by the Great Wizard?"; Transliteration: "Shakunetsu no Bōsō Tokkyū! Daimadōshi ga Nokoshita Madōgu?" (Japanese: 灼熱の暴走特急! 〜大魔導師が残した魔道具?〜)	Shin Matsuo	Akatsuki Yamatoya	Shin Matsuo	October 27, 2008	September 22, 2013
Kid and the Thompson sisters head over to a train station in the Sahara Desert to investigate a possible magic tool being the power source of an unstoppable train known as the Runaway Express. They end up facing the youngest Mizune and the Fisher King, an Arachnophobia assassin, who also wish to take control of the tool. Upon defeating the Fisher King, Kid discovers that his father had something to do with the creation of the train along with the great wizard Eibon. Before the Fisher King can elaborate, he is killed by Sid, and Mizune escapes. While investigating in the library, Kid discovers the only book containing information on Eibon was checked out on the day that Asura was revived, deducing that Medusa was responsible for checking out the book.
31	"Drying Happiness! Whose Tears Sparkle in the Moonlight?"; Transliteration: "Kareta Shiawase: Tsukiakari ni Hikaru no wa Dare no Namida?" (Japanese: 涸れた幸福(しあわせ) 〜月明かりに光るのは誰の涙?〜)	Ikurō Satō	Akatsuki Yamatoya	Sōichi Masui	November 3, 2008	September 29, 2013
Crona is experiencing a new life at the DWMA, and ends up going to a party with Maka, Black Star, and Kid. Crona encounters the newly revived Medusa, who tells to search around the DWMA for the vault. Crona does so, and is quickly found by Marie. Marie leads Crona to Crona's room, and Crona shortly meets with Eruka. Medusa, broadcasting through Eruka, tells Crona to drop a liquid in Marie's drink, and when doing so, they are able to hear Marie and Stein. Crona goes to Stein's house to talk with Marie, and adds the liquid to Marie's drink.
32	"Legend of the Holy Sword 3 – The Academy Gang Leader's Tale?"; Transliteration: "Seiken Densetsu Surī: Shibusen Banchō Monogatari?" (Japanese: 聖剣伝説3 〜死武専番長物語?〜)	Shingo Kaneko	Yoneki Tsumura	Shingo Kaneko	November 10, 2008	October 6, 2013
Hiro, an ordinary DWMA student who is always being ordered around by his classmates, learns about the legend of Excalibur and decides to retrieve it in order to become a true hero. The students of the DWMA are surprised when they learn that Hiro has indeed managed to make Excalibur his weapon. However, even as Black Star with Tsubaki, Kid with the Thompson sisters, and Kilik Rung with the Pots of Fire and Thunder decide to challenge him together, they all are defeated with a single blow. To continue being Excalibur's master, Hiro manages to successfully complete the 1000 requests ordered by him, but decides to discard him and return to his former life, as he cannot tolerate his annoying sneeze.
33	"Resonance Link – Play the Melody of the Souls?"; Transliteration: "Kyōmei Rensa: Kanadero, Tamashii Tachi no Senritsu?" (Japanese: 共鳴連鎖 〜奏でろ、魂たちの旋律?〜)	Yoshiyuki Asai	Megumi Shimizu	Shinji Ishihira	November 17, 2008	October 13, 2013
Stein continues to have moments of insanity caused by Asura's revival along with additional destabilization from Medusa's magic within Marie, which results in Lord Death's concern. Meanwhile, Black Star resonates with the soul of the Enchanted Sword, a giant deer-like creature, who warns Black Star about his descent to a demon. Stein and Death discuss the topic of "Brew", in which the DWMA and Arachnophobia are likely to meet in combat for, and Lord Death instructs Stein to speed up the process of duel arts for the students for greater offense. Maka, Black Star, and Kid are formed as a team, along with their weapons. After many unsuccessful attempts, Maka accuses Black Star for their failure to do so, causing the two quarrel over the mishap. Ultimately after conversing with Tsubaki, Maka begins to accept Black Star for who he is, resulting in the accomplishment of duel arts among the three.
34	"The Battle for Brew – Clash: The DWMA vs. Arachnophobia?"; Transliteration: "Buryū Sōdatsusen! Gekitotsu, Shibusen vs Arakunofobia?" (Japanese: BREW争奪戦! 〜激突、死武専vsアラクノフォビア?〜)	Hiroshi Ikehata	Akatsuki Yamatoya	Tensai Okamura	November 24, 2008	October 20, 2013
The DWMA and Arachnophobia are imminent to engage in combat over the magic tool "Brew". Sid and his team will contain Arachnophobia while Stein and his group attempt to recover "Brew". Shortly after landfall, Sid's team is ambushed by Mifune's Arachnophobia squad, and Sid and Azusa confront Mifune. Justin confronts Giriko. Stein and Marie enter a strong magnetic field while the others wait behind, but Maka eventually loses track of Stein's and Marie's soul wavelength. Ox, Kilik, and Kim Diehl, along their respective weapons Harvar, Fire and Thunder, and Jacqueline O'Lantern Dupré, all hold off the enemies while Maka, Black Star, and Kid enter the magnetic field to find Stein and Marie, however they find a perplexing image of the old Lord Death and Arachne and discover they are foreseeing the past. Meanwhile, Eruka sends the Mizunes into the magnetic field.
35	"Mosquito's Storm! Ten Minutes to Fight in the World of the Past?"; Transliteration: "Arashi no Mosukīto! Arishi hi no Sekai, Seigen Jikan wa Jū-pun?" (Japanese: 嵐のモスキート! 〜在りし日の世界、制限時間は10分?〜)	Toshinori Narita	Akatsuki Yamatoya	Toshinori Narita, Shinji Ishihira	December 1, 2008	October 27, 2013
Outside the field, the skirmishes between the DWMA and Arachnophobia end when Kim gives the signal to retreat as instructed. Meanwhile, Maka, Black Star, and Kid meet Marie and a maddened Stein inside the field. Because their bodies have reached the limit, Stein and Marie are forced to leave the field while the other proceed to locate "Brew". They encounter Mosquito, who claims to have "Brew" in his possession. He then reverts his body to a stronger form dated a century ago, but before they begin to battle, Eibon appears, leaving Kid temporarily distracted until Black Star and Maka begin attacking Mosquito. Meanwhile, outside the field, Kim reaches the retreat point, only to find Sid, Niagus, and Azusa and that none of her companions have returned. Meanwhile, Ox and Kilik have defeated all of Arachnophobia's forces near the field, but after noting only Stein and Marie exiting the field, they enter into it to lend a hand to their friends. Meanwhile, Mosquito easily overpowers Maka, Black Star, and Kid, until Little Demon goads Soul into playing the piano with his soul and lead the duel arts resonance link.
36	"Unleash the Seven's Resonance Link! A Recital of Destruction and Creation?"; Transliteration: "Hanate, Shichi-nin no Kyōmei Rensa! Hakai to Sōzō no Ensōkai?" (Japanese: 放て、7人の共鳴連鎖! 〜破壊と創造の演奏会?〜)	Shin Matsuo	Akatsuki Yamatoya	Shin Matsuo	December 8, 2008	November 3, 2013
Giriko battles Justin, however he retreats after getting hit by Justin's law-abiding silver gun. Meanwhile, the Mizunes exit the magnetic field. Meanwhile, Maka, Black Star, and Kid gain an excessive amount of power due to Soul playing the piano for the Little Demon and have completed the duel arts resonance link. After turning the tables on Mosquito, they all finish him off with their soul resonances: first, Black Star uses "Shadow Star: Checkmate Slash", second, Kid uses his "Death Cannon", finally, Maka uses a new attack called "Genie Hunter". However, Mosquito manages to escape, resulting in the DWMA's mission failing. However, Mosquito reports that "Brew" is broken, but Arachne is confident that it will work in their favor, as DWMA is unaware of this. However, Eruka and the Mizunes deliver the real "Brew" to Medusa, who also reveals that the snake planted in Marie speeds up Stein's madness.
37	"The Detective's First Case – Kid Exposes the DWMA's Secret?"; Transliteration: "Meitantei Daiichi no Jiken: Kiddo ga Abaku Shibusen no Himitsu?" (Japanese: 名探偵第一の事件 〜キッドが暴く死武専の秘密?〜)	Shin'ichi Tōkairin	Akatsuki Yamatoya	Sōichi Masui	December 15, 2008	November 10, 2013
Arachne continues with her plans. Meanwhile at the DWMA, everyone assigned on the "Brew" mission is depressed about their defeat against Arachnophobia. However, Kid ponders Lord Death's association with Eibon and later interrogates Stein about what "Brew" is and why Lord Death sought to possess it, but their chat turns into an argument about Lord Death's and Kid's justified actions. Later, Maka questions her ability of using "Genie Hunter" while fighting Mosquito, discussing the matter to Lord Death, who informs her that it a technique used by her mother; determined to use "Genie Hunter" again, Maka and Soul make an attempt, but they fail to do so. Meanwhile, Crona learns of Stein's maddened state and feels guilty of causing it. At the end of the day, a man named Joe Buttataki arrives at Death City at Lord Death's request.
38	"Asura's Temptation – The Big Man's Uncontainable Irritation?"; Transliteration: "Shura e no Yūwaku: Biggu na Otoko no Osaerarenai Iradachi?" (Japanese: 修羅への誘惑 〜ビッグな男の抑えられない苛立ち?〜)	Makoto Fuchigami	Akatsuki Yamatoya	Shinji Ishihira	December 22, 2008	November 17, 2013
Once he arrives at the DWMA, Joe begins his project by using the magic tools that are in Lord Death's possession. Meanwhile, Black Star's confidence begins to waver due to his recent defeats. When Tsubaki tells that Naigus asked her to stop using the Enchanted Sword Mode, Black Star decides to challenge Kid in a duel, but his soul force attack fails to activate. Kid eventually wins the battle, and Black Star starts training again. Meanwhile, Medusa feels that Crona is no longer useful enough to be kept alive, and Arachne discovers the hideout of Asura.
39	"Crona's Escape – Show Me Your Smile, Please?"; Transliteration: "Kurona, Tōbō: Kudasai, Kimi no Hohoemi?" (Japanese: クロナ、逃亡 〜ください、君の微笑み?〜)	Takefumi Anzai	Megumi Shimizu	Takuya Igarashi	January 5, 2009	November 24, 2013
Crona is visited by Eruka again, who tells him to return to Medusa. Meanwhile, Arachne visits Asura alone in the mountains to ask for an alliance against the DWMA, but Asura thrashes her about. Maka and Soul begin to search for Crona, after Death Scythe informs them that Crona has gone missing; it is revealed that Crona is outside of the DWMA walking in the desert sand, where Crona then falls into a hole and sits there, trying to hide from everyone. Back at Arachnophobia, Asura eventually has allied with Arachne. Maka and Soul find Crona in the hole, where Crona confesses about putting Medusa's snake in Marie's tea. Lord Death discusses with Death Scythe and Maka about Crona's betrayal when Sid suddenly announces that Medusa has come to the DWMA to surrender.
40	"The Cards Are Cut – Medusa Surrenders to the DWMA?"; Transliteration: "Kirareta Kādo: Medyūsa, Shibusen ni Tōkō Suru?" (Japanese: 切られたカード 〜メデューサ、死武専に投降する?〜)	Hiroya Saitō	Akatsuki Yamatoya	Katsumi Terahigashi	January 12, 2009	December 1, 2013
To win the DWMA's trust, Medusa reveals the location of the real "Brew", and proposes to give information about Asura's whereabouts in exchange for her freedom and protection of her peers. When Arachne moves on with her plan to spread Asura's madness throughout the world, Lord Death decides to accept the deal. Medusa walking free shocks all the DWMA students. Marie later discovers that Stein is nowhere to be found.
41	"Twirl 'Round and 'Round – A New World in Which the Doc Dances?"; Transliteration: "Kurukuru Kururu: Hakase wa Odoru, Atarashiki Sekai?" (Japanese: クルクルクルル 〜博士は踊る、新しき世界?〜)	Ikurō Satō	Megumi Shimizu	Shinji Ishihira	January 19, 2009	January 5, 2014
A maddened Stein struggles with deciding the path he should take. Meanwhile, Joe discovers a secret page in the Book of Eibon, which shows it takes one last magic tool to operate "Brew". Crona and Marie decide to search for Medusa and bring back Stein. Maka, Black Star, and Kid, being doubtful about the DWMA, remain firm in fighting and defeating Asura. Finally, the path that Stein walks leads him to Medusa.
42	"Charge Baba Yaga's Castle! Things Are Kind of Gloomy?"; Transliteration: "Shingeki! Baba Yagā no Shiro: Nanka Moyamoya Suru?" (Japanese: 進撃! ババ･ヤガーの城 〜なんかモヤモヤする?〜)	Shin Matsuo	Akatsuki Yamatoya	Shin Matsuo	January 26, 2009	January 12, 2014
Maka is confused due to the decisions recently taken by the DWMA, which is preparing for a huge battle against Arachnophobia, to defeat it along with Asura and destroying the six madness amplifiers. Sid later informs Maka that Crona and Marie have set off to defeat Medusa, stating that Crona's exile and Marie quitting her job acts as a loophole in the deal between Medusa and Lord Death. When the mission begins, Maka, Soul, Black Star, Tsubaki, and Sid press onto Baba Yaga's Castle but are ambushed by Arachne's forces. Meanwhile, Justin starts a fight against Giriko. After Soul convinces Maka to follow her convictions, she leaves Black Star to go after Crona. Meanwhile, Kid is on the way to retrieve the latest magic tool.
43	"The Last Magic Tool – Mission Impossible for Unarmed Kid?"; Transliteration: "Saigo no Madōgu: Buki Nashi Kiddo no Misshon Inposshiburu?" (Japanese: 最後の魔道具 〜武器無しキッドのミッションインポッシブル?〜)	Daisuke Chiba	Akatsuki Yamatoya	Sōichi Masui	February 2, 2009	January 19, 2014
The battle against the DWMA and Arachnophobia continues. Kid, Liz, and Patty arrive at their destination, a town called Sarcophagus, whose inhabitants had disappeared mysteriously twenty years before. For the sake of his partners, Kid decides to enter the village alone. Once in, he easily finds the magic tool, but is attacked by a strange Clown, who informs him that it ate the villagers when they discovered the magic tool. Meanwhile, a lost Maka realizes she needs to use her Soul Perception ability in order to find Crona. Kid is chased by the Clown, who is soon joined by a second one. Due to the symmetrical attacks of the identical Clowns, Kid is unable to respond until Liz and Patty arrive to help and successfully defeat them. Shortly after the battle, a mysterious voice from the defeated robotic Clown warns Kid of disastrous consequences of the wrong person using the tool, leading him to decide not to give the magic tool to Lord Death just yet.
44	"Weakling Crona's Determination – For You, for Always Being by My Side?"; Transliteration: "Yowamushi Kurona no Ketsui: Itsumo Soba ni Ite Kureta Kimi ni?" (Japanese: 弱虫クロナの決意 〜いつもそばにいてくれた君に?〜)	Takefumi Anzai	Akatsuki Yamatoya	Shingo Kaneko	February 9, 2009	January 26, 2014
Maka uses her Soul Perception ability to find Crona. Black Star continues to advance to Baba Yaga's Castle. Meanwhile, Crona and Marie manage to find Medusa's hideout and battle with her and a maddened Stein. Crona struggles in the battle with Medusa, but when she moves in to deliver the killing blow, Maka arrives in the nick of time to intercept the attack.
45	"Anti-magic Wavelength – Fierce Attack, the Anger-filled Genie Hunter?"; Transliteration: "Taima no Hachō: Mōkō, Ikari no Majin Gari?" (Japanese: 退魔の波長 〜猛攻、怒りの魔人狩り?〜)	Makoto Fuchigami	Akatsuki Yamatoya	Shinji Ishihira	February 16, 2009	February 2, 2014
Maka, Crona, and Marie continue their battle with Medusa and Stein, but are being overwhelmed. Marie asks Maka to concentrate on Stein, which gives her the chance to use the Healing Wavelength, but this fails. Medusa then moves in to finish off Maka, but Crona pushes her out of way and takes the full force of Medusa's Vector Blade, leaving Crona greatly injured and seemingly dead. Enraged at the apparent death of her friend, Maka is consumed by the madness and attacks Medusa in a frenzied rage, but Stein comes to her defense. Taking advantage of the opening, Marie uses her Healing Wavelength on Stein and Maka, saving them from their madness. Stein and Marie then distract Medusa while Maka and Soul use the opportunity to attack her with Genie Hunter, saving Rachel and defeating Medusa at the same time. As Medusa disintegrates, she warns them that Genie Hunter won't be enough to defeat Asura, but Stein tells Maka otherwise. Stein then tells Maka that Crona is not dead and will make a full recovery, then leaves to take the unconscious back to Death City while Maka resumes her fight with Arachnaphobia. Meanwhile, Black Star finally reaches Baba Yaga's Castle to battle Mifune.
46	"Warrior or Slaughterer? Showdown: Mifune vs. Black☆Star?"; Transliteration: "Bu ka Shura ka: Kessen, Mifune vs Burakku Sutā?" (Japanese: 武か修羅か 〜決戦、ミフネvsブラック☆スター?〜)	Toshinori Narita	Akatsuki Yamatoya, Megumi Shimizu	Toshinori Narita	February 23, 2009	February 9, 2014
As Mifune fights with Black Star, he asks him whether he will follow the path of a warrior or a demon, recounting how Black Star's father, White Star, chose the wrong path of a demon and Mifune was forced to kill him. Meanwhile, Kid returns to Death City and Lord Death is now ready to explain the purpose of the magic tool, revealing that the final tool contains Eibon's soul needed to operate "Brew" and that Eibon once served as one of eight of Lord Death's warriors in the past. As Lord Death explains that Eibon used the magic tools as part of research for the greater good, Excalibur, who wishes to observe the transpiring events, arrives and reveals that Eibon was obsessed with immortality and was unable to find a way to transcend death until Arachne offered a helping hand. Meanwhile, as the DWMA near Baba Yaga's Castle, Mosquito operates a weapon of mass destruction. Returning to the battle, Black Star refuses to listen to Mifune, who, seeing no possibility of change for his opponent, decides to finish him with a lethal blow. Eibon finally puts the function of "Brew" to work and unlock its power.
47	"The Miraculous Coffee Table Flip – Fly, Our Death City Robot?"; Transliteration: "Kiseki no Chabudaigaeshi: Bokura no Desu Shitī Robo?" (Japanese: 奇跡のちゃぶ台返し 〜僕らのデス･シティーロボ?〜)	Shin Matsuo	Akatsuki Yamatoya, Megumi Shimizu	Shin Matsuo	March 2, 2009	February 16, 2014
After taking Mifune's lethal blow, Black Star finds himself deep within the soul of the Enchanted Sword, where he is devoured by the souls fallen by the blade. Instead, Black Star accepts the burdens of those slain by the Enchanted Sword and vows to fight for them, finally mastering the weapon, and, declaring that he will take the path of neither the warrior nor the demon but his own, defeats Mifune. Black Star then spares Mifune and continues to invite him to be a teacher at the DWMA, and they soon set off to find Angela. Meanwhile, Free, Eruka, and Mizune flee from Baba Yaga's Castle after sensing the demise of Medusa. Meanwhile, wishing to repent for helping Arachne, Eibon uses a key created from his own soul to activate "Brew", which has been revealed to grant the desires of whoever uses it. Lord Death uses the Magic Tool to transform Death City into a giant robot, desiring to personally fight for others, and swiftly enters the battle. Baba Yaga's Castle immediately becomes mobile and fights Death City, but Death City eventually manages to breach the castle, grab Asura, pull him out into the open and consumes him, apparently trapping him inside the city.
48	"Lord Death Wields a Death Scythe – Just One Step from Utter Darkness?"; Transliteration: "Desu Saizu o Motta Shinigami-sama: Chotto Saki wa Yami Darake?" (Japanese: 武器(デスサイズ)を持った死神様 〜一寸先はヤミだらけ?〜)	Ikurō Satō	Akatsuki Yamatoya	Katsumi Terahigashi	March 9, 2009	February 23, 2014
Upon being devoured by the mobilized Death City, Asura lands in the Death Room, where he is confronted by Lord Death and Death Scythe. Meanwhile Black Star, Tsubaki, and an injured Mifune find Angela in Baba Yaga's Castle. Lord Death and Asura begin to battle while Kid, Azusa, and Excalibur observe. As they fight, Asura begins to explain his purpose in life, believing that fear is the result of the imagination of the people, and plans to end all fear by spreading madness and preventing people from imagining again, but Lord Death disagrees, declaring to be the guardian of the world. Lord Death appears to have the upper hand until Asura fires a large blast from Vajra at Kid and Azusa, forcing Lord Death to block the blast with his body, leaving him gravely injured. Excalibur rebukes Asura who stands over Lord Death until he begins to have strange spasms and goes back to Arachne. As Arachne embraces Asura, he murders Arachne and devours her soul out of fear of her.
49	"Asura Wakes – To the End of the World?"; Transliteration: "Ashura Kakusei: Sekai no Ikitsuku Hate e?" (Japanese: 阿修羅覚醒 〜世界の行き着く果てへ?〜)	Takefumi Anzai	Akatsuki Yamatoya	Tensai Okamura	March 16, 2009	March 2, 2014
Asura, being injured from the battle with Lord Death, begins to put up a barrier around himself preparing for a deep sleep. Before the barrier closes, Maka, Black Star, Kid, and their weapons are the only ones able to get inside and they proceed to end the madness that began long ago. However, having devoured Arachne's soul, Asura grows tremendously in size and strength, but although they do not appear to be injuring him, Kid thinks they are as the barrier is weakening. However, Soul accidentally pushes himself too far and is devoured by the black blood of the Little Demon. With Soul, the only one who can help them do a duel arts resonance link, down for the count, Maka goes to bring Soul back, with Black Star and Kid protecting her, and after crossing a long corridor she finds "Soul", who closes the door behind her. Meanwhile, Crona recovers from the previous battle's injuries, Justin convinces Giriko to retreat, and everyone else outside of the barrier is forced to do nothing but place their hopes in Maka, Black Star, and Kid.
50	"Sink or Swim?! The Men Who Transcend the Gods?"; Transliteration: "Ichi ka Bachi ka?! Kami o Koeru Otokotachi?" (Japanese: イチかバチか?! 〜神を超える男たち?〜)	Shingo Kaneko	Akatsuki Yamatoya	Shingo Kaneko	March 23, 2009	March 9, 2014
While everyone outside the barrier can only sit and wait anxiously, Death Scythe recovers, and Black Star and Kid continue to battle Asura with almost no results. Determined to avenge his father and protect the world, Kid tries to charge up, but Asura stabs him and Kid collapses to the ground. Seemingly dead, Kid's eyes suddenly fill with a blue light as the Lines of Sanzu, the white stripes in Kid's hair, activate and his soul becomes extremely powerful as his Death Cannon powers up. While Asura is distracted by this, Black Star takes advantage of the opening and knocks down Asura, allowing the empowered Kid to attack. However, Kid faints and Asura shrinks down to normal. Meanwhile, Maka is locked in a room with "Soul", telling her to open a box containing his courage, in which Soul's voice comes out from the box claiming to be the real Soul who sealed himself to prevent the madness from reaching him. However, Maka, knowing her partner too well, is aware that the "Soul" with her is actually Little Demon, who states to be a part of Soul now. Risking being devoured by the black blood while promising to save him, she decides to open a locked box and successfully saves him from darkness. Having lost control of the situation, the Little Demon shrinks in size, allowing Soul, who accepts the black blood as part of him, to eat him in one gulp. The two of them return to the battle to find everyone else laying unconscious and Asura still undefeated.
51	"The Word Is Bravery!"; Transliteration: "Aikotoba wa Yūki!" (Japanese: 合言葉は勇気!)	Ikurō Satō, Takuya Igarashi	Akatsuki Yamatoya	Takuya Igarashi	March 30, 2009	March 16, 2014
Maka and Soul are the only ones left standing against Asura. Believing that Maka's Genie Hunter is the only one that can combat against Asura, her strength and determination upgrades her ultimate attack to Kishin Hunter, but Asura easily shatters the attack and regenerates from it, and proceeds to issue his own attacks, one of which is blocked by Soul and for which Maka takes the full hit to protect Soul's unconscious body. As Asura believes Maka is finally defeated, her weapon blood awakens and she unconsciously continues attacking, but Asura still easily takes her down and forces her weapon blood to concede by waking her up with pain. Meanwhile, Crona tells everyone that Maka's true strength comes from her heart and not a technique, and Lord Death recovers. As Asura tells Maka that all hope for her is lost, she and the others, who recover from their unconscious state, reply that true strength comes from bravery. Asura, who does not understand what bravery is, then begins succumbing to fear. Afraid, Asura weakly tries to deny Maka's advances, but his attempts are futile when she punches him straight to the face. Realizing that bravery is just like madness, Asura explodes, cleansing the world of his madness. However, Kid fears the rebirth of another kishin. Maka remains confident, as everyone has bravery in their hearts.

== Home media release ==
=== Japanese ===
Media Factory (Japan – Region 2/A)
Volume	Release date	Episodes	Ref.
Soul.1	August 22, 2008	1–3	
Soul.2	September 25, 2008	4–7	
Soul.3	October 24, 2008	8–11	
Soul.4	November 21, 2008	12–15	
Soul.5	December 25, 2008	16–19	
Soul.6	January 23, 2009	20–23	
Soul.7	February 25, 2009	24–27	
Soul.8	March 25, 2009	28–31	
Soul.9	April 24, 2009	32–35	
Soul.10	May 22, 2009	36–39	
Soul.11	June 25, 2009	40–43	
Soul.12	July 24, 2009	44–47	
Soul.13	August 25, 2009	48–51	

=== English ===
Funimation (North America – Region 1/A)
Name	Release date	Discs	Episodes
Part One	February 9, 2010	2	1–13
Part Two	March 30, 2010	2	14–26
Part Three	June 1, 2010	2	27–39
Part Four	July 27, 2010	2	40–51
The Meister Collection	May 24, 2011	4 (DVD); 3 (BD)	1–26
The Weapon Collection	August 9, 2011	4 (DVD); 3 (BD)	27–51
Complete Series	November 20, 2012	8 (DVD); 6 (BD)	1–51

== See also ==
- List of Soul Eater characters
- List of Soul Eater chapters
