= Hei (Darker than Black) =

Darker than Black character

- Darker than Black character
- Promotional illustration of Hei
- First appearance: Darker than Black episode 1: "The Fallen Star of a Contract (Part 1)" (April 5, 2007)
- Created by: Tensai Okamura
- Designed by: Yuji Iwahara
- Voiced by: Hidenobu Kiuchi (Japanese); Jason Liebrecht (English)

In-universe information
- Aliases: Li Shenshun, BK-201
- Gender: Male
- Relatives: Bai (sister)

Hei (Japanese: 黒(ヘイ), Hepburn: pinyin: Hēi; lit. 'Black'), also known as Li Shenshun (李舜生(リ・シェンシュン), Ri Shenshun; pinyin: Lǐ Shùnshēng), is a fictional character and the protagonist of the 2007 anime series Darker than Black by Bones. Codenamed "Hei", he is portrayed as a Contractor, a man that has supernatural powers with Hei being able to generate electricity. In Tokyo, Hei works for an organization known as the Syndicate and earns the nickname "Black Reaper" (黒の死神, Kuro no Shinigami) due to his skills as an assassin. During the series, Hei's backstory of his mission involving his missing sister is developed. Hei also appears in the sequel Darker than Black: Gemini of the Meteor as the mentor of young Contractor Suo Pavlichenko while searching for his partner, Yin. He is also present in the inter-sequel original video animations Darker than Black: Gaiden, which explores his escape from the Syndicate with Yin between the events of both anime.

Hei's character was created by anime director Tensai Okamura, who cited espionage, ninja, and dual-personality influences in contrasting his daily life with his gruesome work. Yuji Iwahara faced multiple difficulties in making his design appealing, while Okamura was surprised by Hei's popularity in the series with male and female viewers. In the anime version, Hei is voiced by Hidenobu Kiuchi in Japanese and Jason Liebrecht in English.

The character appeared in a number of popularity polls about anime characters, and was considered one of the best male characters from Japan during the 2000s. Critical response was mainly positive, noting his dual personality. Hei was initially seen as mysterious at the start of the first series, but quickly developed into more a caring character. His role in the OVAs and his original relationship with Yin were praised, but his darker portrayal Gemini of Meteor and his poor relationship with Suo had a mixed response.

== Creation ==
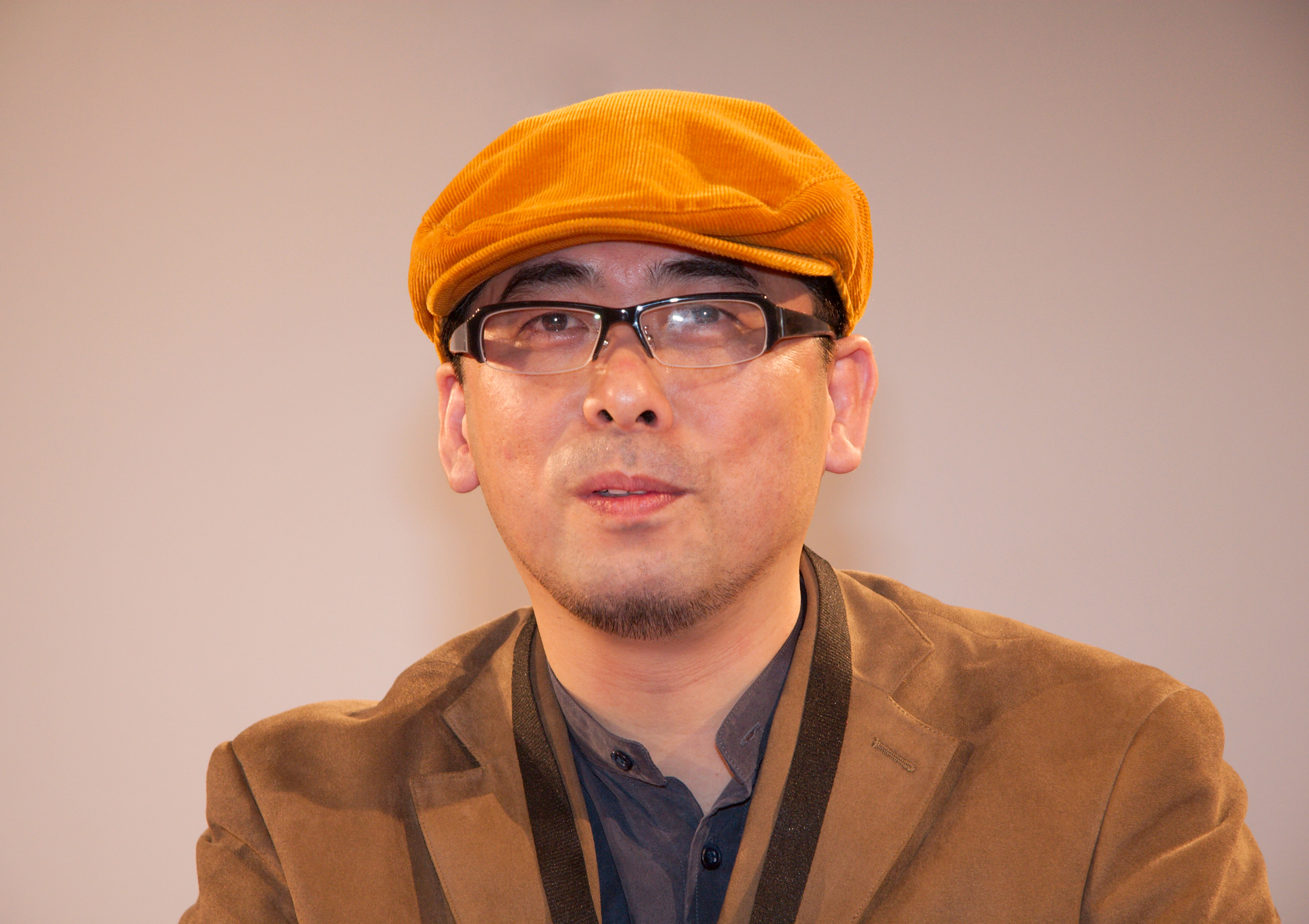
Tensai Okamura created Hei.

Director Tensai Okamura created Hei. Okamura cited a number of influence for its creation, including the concept of a ninja-type spy working for Tokyo which he saw when he was young. He wanted Hei to appear as a nice, unaffected man of good character. Since the character is portrayed as an assassin who normally does not want to kill targets, Okamura wanted the viewers to judge Hei themselves. Okamura wanted Codename BK201 as the series' title, but the anime staff found it too weak and Darker Than Black was chosen by a member of MBS TV. Hei's codename was initially 201-BL as 201 was Okamura's apartment number. As Hei's state of mind remains unknown in early episodes of the series, Okamura said the lyrics of the theme song, "Howling" by Abingdon Boys School, give multiple hints about how the character thinks.

First-anime writer Kurasumi Sunayama said that Hei is humorous as he pretends to be a Chinese student. Episode twelve raises the possibility that Hei is not a real Contractor due to his sensitivity. Yuuichi Nomura, known for writing tragic storylines, wrote the episodes about Hei's issues with Amber, who holds romantic feelings for him. Nomura focused on the fact that the two would never be together, and Amber dies in the finale. Main writer Shōtarō Suga wrote the episodes where Hei befriends a spy who steals an item from the Pandora organization that oversees the supernatural Gates which created the power of Contractors. Hei's friendship with the spy results in a character arc which concludes in the finale, when he has a vision in the Gate of being helped by the dead spy. Hei eventually betrays the Syndicate to protect humans and Contractors after being motivated by the people he has a vision of. In Gemini of the Meteor, Okamura considered Hei a "rough, working guy", and Suo Pavlichenko took over the lead role to make Darker than Black more innovative.

During Gemini of the Meteor, the second anime, Kiuchi said that he found Hei a far darker character for some reason. The actor said Hei is notably strict with younger lead Suo, and he wished that Hei would show a more caring side to the teenager. Although there were only two years between both Darker than Black series, the actor found voicing Hei challenging due to the change in his personality. Instead of a happy ending, however, the original video animations and the sequel Gemini of the Meteor strike a noir note based on Gee's comments. Hei cannot enjoy life in the sequels, leading him to begin a new journey in which he aids the young Suo in the process. Okamura wanted the original video animations (OVA)s plots to center on Hei and Yin's relationship after the first anime, leading to Gemini of the Meteor. About Hei's history with Yin, the writer for Gaiden stated he found it depressing Hei said in Gemini of the Meteor that he was going to kill Yin. Yasushi Ishii wrote "Darker than Black", a song centered around Hei, for the OVAs. According to Ishii, the character is a man who fights to achieve salvation in a world without salvation – a man in a world of struggle, mercy, and overcoming oneself. Despite Hei's powers, Ishii wanted to highlight the character's essential loneliness.

=== Design ===
According to designer Yuji Iwahara, Hei was the hardest character to draw. Iwahara struggled to achieve a subtle balance when designing him. Hei's black eyes were originally smaller, conveying a colder impression, but they became more expressive. Hei's civilian persona, Li, was originally a gentle-looking person. Due to Hei's cold and sometimes-blank appearance, the staff decided to draw his eyes without highlights, which was still relatively unusual in anime. Okamura told Iwahara not to make Hei a bishōnen archetype, because he did not want the character to appear androgynous. Iwahara remembered changing the size of Hei's eyes. Hei's design was altered in the sequel Darker than Black: Gemini of the Meteor, giving him longer hair and facial hair. Although Okamura liked the new design, it was unpopular with the female staff members. By the ninth episode, it was decided to change Hei's design again. Animator Hitomi Nadashima drew the scene of Hei changing his look.

Fuji of Aniplex wanted the fans to look forward to the OVA's fight scenes, particularly Hei's. Since the first episode involves the two pretending to be newlyweds, the staff wanted fans to see through the charade while making both of their physical looks more appealing. When Yin's alter ego, Izanami, takes the form of Yin and becomes infatuated with Hei, the animation staff made the scene erotic. The fourth episode gives a glimpse of the character's weakness, however, and a tragic fate for Yin as Hei is pushed with the idea of killing her, but he refuses. Iwahara was instructed to draw both characters in a sexually-appealing way.

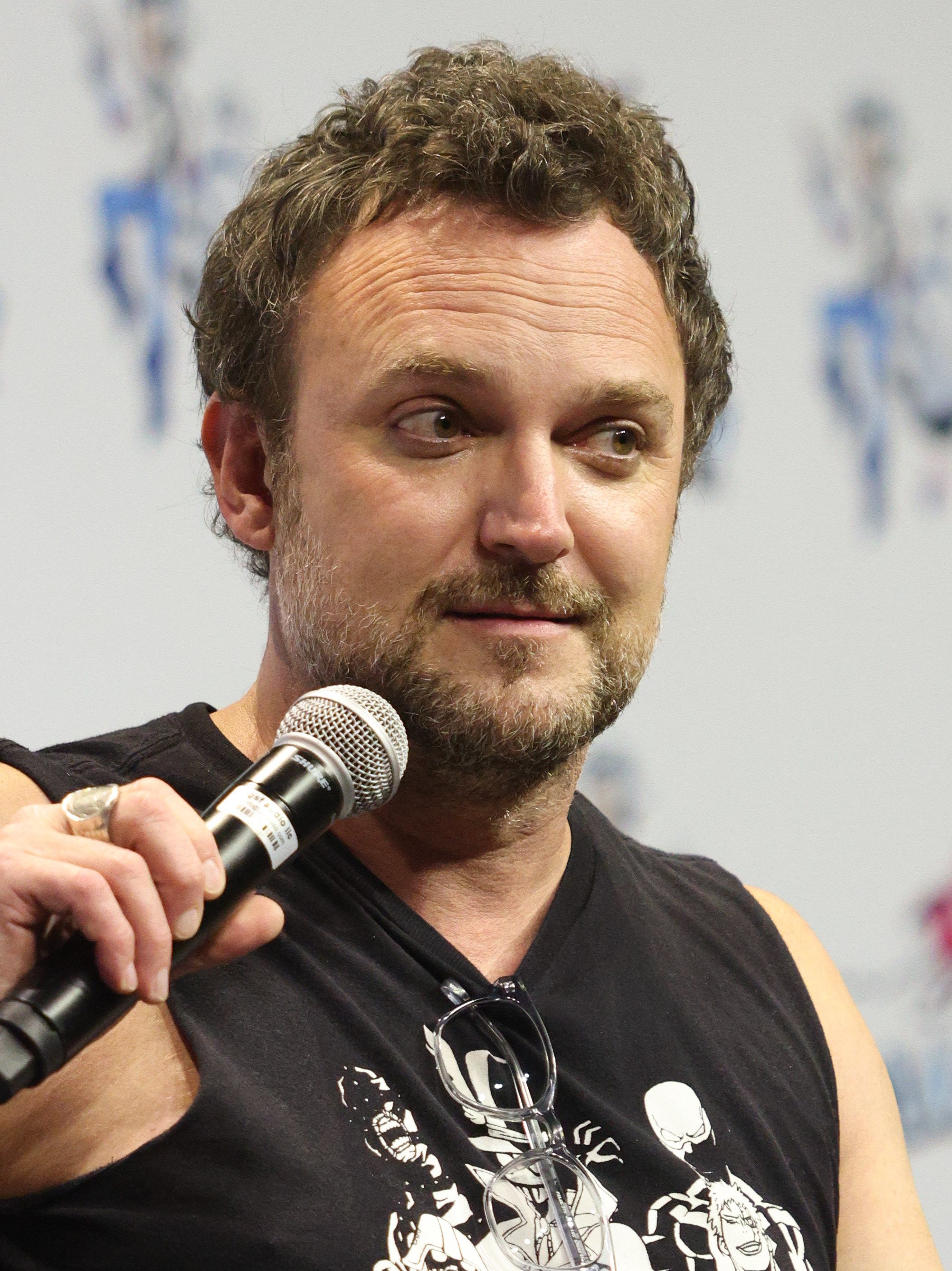
Jason Liebrecht voices Hei in English.

=== Casting ===
Hei is voiced in Japanese by Hidenobu Kiuchi. Kiuchi said that Hei is a professional killer who carries out missions as a Contractor as ordered by the Syndicate and assumes the identity of Li Shun Sheng, a Chinese university student who lives in an apartment. He said that while Li is a warm person, Hei has an emotionless, cold facade, giving the character two personalities thus making him a mystery to him when he began recording the anime. He faced a number of dilemmas when voicing the character, such as whether he should express more emotion as a Contractor. In retrospect, Kiuchi called Hei one of his favorite characters.

In the English dub of the series, Hei is voiced by Jason Liebrecht. He said that director Zach Bolton cast everyone to sound as natural as possible. When asked if Hei was a protagonist or an antagonist, Liebrecht said that the character is conflicted; Hei is a "hitman with a conscience". The actor called Darker than Black and Crayon Shin-chan his favorite voice-dubbing experiences, and was glad that Hei's voice was close to his own and he did not have to make eating noises. Anime News Network called Liebrecht's voicing of Hei "a schizophrenic variation" of Syaoran from Tsubasa: Reservoir Chronicle.

== Appearances ==
=== Darker than Black ===
In the anime Darker than Black, Hei is first shown as an assassin who moves to Tokyo while taking a new persona. As a civilian he is Li Shenshun, a good-natured Chinese exchange student who lives in an old apartment complex for foreigners and gets by with temporary part-time jobs. Hei is said to be a Contractor, a man with supernatural powers with Hei's ability being to generate electricity in deadly concentrations. Li's part-time jobs are related to Hei's current mission as a member of a secret organization known as the Syndicate. Despite the Contractors' fame for being coldhearted, Hei also demonstrates compassion and sorrow, much to the surprise of others. He is aided by Yin, an emotionless human known as a Doll, and Mao, a contractor trapped in a cat's body and overseen by the agent Huang. Hei began working with the Syndicate as a child assassin to protect his sister Bai in South America during the Heaven's Gate war, and his goal is to find her again.

Hei is linked with Amber, a former Syndicate agent who leads the Evening Primrose Contractor group and whom Hei blames for Bai's disappearance. During the climax, Hei is persuaded by his allies to work individually and focus on Amber rather than fight her. Hei learns that his abilities are inherited from Bai, who can manipulate molecules at the quantum level. Due to her molecular control, Bai resides in Hei's body. Although he has Contractor abilities, Hei is not a true Contractor because he can express a range of emotions. When the Syndicate reveals a weapon to cause genocide within Contractors, Hei must make a decisive choice. Hei's decision stops the Syndicate from eliminating the Contractors with Amber's help. Following Amber's death, Hei escapes with Yin from Tokyo.

=== Darker than Black: Gemini of the Meteor ===
Hei's appearance in Gemini of the Meteor had a mixed response from the Bones staff.

In Darker than Black: Gemini of the Meteor, Hei is in Vladivostok seeking a meteor fragment from young Contractor Shion Pavlichenko. Hei mistakes Shion for Shion's twin sister Suo during his attack. Hei overpowers attacking Contractors from the Ministry of Internal Affairs and Communications' Section 3. Before he finishes off one of them, however, their trap causes Hei to lose his powers. Hei begins taking care of now Contractor Suo and the Doll July as they return to Tokyo from Russia, telling Mao he did it because Suo reminds him of his past self. Although Hei is a strict mentor to Suo, the two manage to get along with Suo convincing him to drop his alcohol abuse if he wants her to train. Underworld member Madame Oreille tells Hei that she found the missing Yin, whom Hei says he must kill. Yin had developed a god-like alter ego, Izanami, and they were split during her brief awakening. In Tokyo, Hei learns from Section 3 of Yin's location as they need him to kill Izanami. As Yin awakens, Hei comforts the dying Suo and confronts Yin with his restored powers. He is later seen leaving the area holding Yin's body. Although Yin's fate is unknown, director Tensai Okamura suggested that it might evoke a tragic ending.

=== Darker than Black: Gaiden ===
The Darker than Black Gaiden OVAs explores Hei's journeys with Yin between the two series. While escaping Okinawa, they pretend to be honeymooners and are attacked by Syndicate's Contractors. In the second episode, Hei and Yin travel Hong Kong where Hei keeps noticing Yin's alter ego, Izanami, suggests faking her kidnapping. The Contractors are defeated by Hei after Izanami kills a woman who attacks him. Amagiri from Evening Primrose saves them and tells Hei how dangerous Yin's alter ego is. Xin-Qi tricks Evening Primrose into attacking Hei while he assumes Amagiri's appearance and escapes with Yin. After taking down Evening Primose, Hei joins a group of Contractors to find Yin. Yin tries to make Hei kill her, but he refuses, and they are separated after an explosion. Depressed by Yin's apparent death, Hei remains in a restaurant drinking alcohol with his hair growing up in the past time. However, Hei learns from his informant that Yin is alive. This leads to the events of Gemini of the Meteor.

=== Other appearances ===
Hei appears in the two manga versions of Darker than Black. The first has a number of changes from the anime, since Hei is replaced by Kana Shino as the main character. Kana witnesses a fight between two Contractors. Her memory of the encounter is erased, but it soon returns and she teams up with Hei, one of the combatants. They search for answers about her father's deceit and the organization with which he has become associated.

Hei and Yin also appear in the manga Shikkoku No Hana, set after the first anime, in which they investigate how a Black Dandelion is giving people Contractor power in accordance with Amber's last wish. Harvest, a former ally of Amber, developed Contractor powers with a Black Dandelion provided by the organization Pandora while trying to prove his superiority over Hei. Hei and Yin encounter a number of allies and enemies, and Hei confronts Contractors who share his powers. With Yin's support, he manipulates his powers to defeat Harvest. Hei and Yin go rogue again in the finale.

In addition to the regular story, the fanbook includes two alternative stories. Hei battles agent November 11 while getting a bath in one, and in the other he has a meal with Mikihara, Yin and Suo. The character also appears in the role-playing game Heroes Phantasia.

== Reception ==
=== Popularity ===
Hei has been a popular character in Japan, and he placed seventh in Animage's 2010 Anime Grand Prix Best Male Character category. Meanwhile, in Newtype polls, Hei was ranked the sixth-best male character in 2007 and the 10th-most-popular male anime character in the 2000s. According to a Fandom Post retrospective, Hei and his voice actors were popular with male and female viewers of the series. The character was nicknamed the "Chinese electric Batman". In 2008, the Society for the Promotion of Japanese Animation ranked Hei the second-best male anime character behind Alucard in Hellsing. Screen Rant came to call Hei Darker than Black's best character during a rating. Furthermore, in a Poo poll, he was ranked the 20th best antihero in anime.

=== Critical response ===
A comparison between Hei's assassin persona (left) and his civilian persona. The handling of these two sides of the character was the subject of analysis by writers.

Critical response to Hei was initially confused about his true nature, with critics uncertain of whether he was fundamentally caring or heartless. Hei's humanity despite his job was generally well-received, however. Hei is seen in the anime's action scenes, and his romantic relationship with Amber helps to illuminate his past. Hei's character development in the series' final episodes was praised, as he interacts with Yin and Amber while ending his journey to learn the truth about his sister's fate. Maxibe Gee of the University of York called the character a "posthuman noir" protagonist similar to Rick Deckard in Do Androids Dream of Electric Sheep?, Motoko Kusanagi in Ghost in the Shell and Vincent Freeman in Gattaca (1997) due to their shared backgrounds and cruelty. Gee noted the similarities in how their actions demonstrate moral ambiguity and personal desires. In Hei's case, Gee focused on his relationship with the humans known as dolls: "identities which are formed by encompassing others, embracing the team of both humans and posthumans". Hei and Yin, strangers in a strange land, are similar to foreigners. Hei's morality is more varied than the Dolls or the other Contractors. His character, a noir protagonist, is betrayed in the second episode by a femme fatale who is a Doll rather than a human woman that is attracted to him. Hei's characterization and growth are compared with Jerold J. Abrams' commentary on the handling of noir. Hei "is defined by the journey he takes to understand his dual human/posthuman nature and his inability to come to terms with what he is." According to Gee, Hei's dual personality, the ruthless assassin and the shy Li, is distinguished by his clothing; Hei is masked and wears a black coat, and Li is often dressed in white. The character's "persona fits into traditional hardboiled rational masculine tropes while the Li persona is characterized by the more stereotypically feminine attributes of empathy and intuition". He said that although Hei is a dark character, his humanity is revealed by his interactions with others such as Yin. Yin's humanity in the first series' finale when Hei nearly disappears into Heaven's Gate saves Hei's life and cements their bond. Instead of a happy ending, however, the original video animations and the sequel Gemini of the Meteor strike a noir note.

Hei's Pierrot mask is considered a defense mechanism compared with the darker personas of famous characters such as Himura Kenshin or Vash the Stampede. According to Ain't It Cool News, "The mask identity is often a fun engine to exciting escapades. If the reason for adopting the mask is credible, the true personality gives the character depth." During the series, Hei wears and removes the mask to show different sides of his personality. Neither is his true persona. Hei's personality is a mixture of both sides, with Li providing comic relief. Okamura was surprised by Hei's popularity, and did not want him to be an archetypical mature and stylish ikemen character. Although there was concern during production about Hei's suitability as the protagonist of an action anime, the character attracted female fans. Japanese voice actress Nana Mizuki acknowledged Hei's popularity with the female audience due to his calm demeanor and the gentleness of his Li persona. Mizuki said that the real Hei might seem cold-hearted compared with the friendly Li. Misato Fukuen, who voices Yin, expressed a preference for Li's personality. She could fall in love with a person like Hei, whose nastiness was tempered by kindness.

In the sequel, Gemini of Meteor, Hei surprised reviewers with his darker portrayal. Hei mentors Suo, the new lead, and The Fandom Post's Josh Begley found the teenager more interesting. The relationship with Hei and Suo was upsetting due to Hei's attacks on Suo's family, but Hei's role as an action hero did not change. A Comic Book Bin reviewer compared their relationship to Léon (Jean Reno) and Mathilda Lando (Natalie Portman), the leads in the 1994 film Léon: The Professional, due to the bond they form while training. An Anime News Network retrospective said that Bones "took a risk" in its portrayal of Hei as an alcoholic during Gemini of the Meteor, and the character's unexplored fate resembled the anime Cowboy Bebop; neither series ended their protagonists.

Critics noted that the OVAs had a "deeper" narrative focused on Hei and Yin (appealing primarily to returning fans) and exploring Hei's downfall, which explained his dark personality in Gemini of the Meteor. My Reviewer called the action sequences "jaw-droppingly intense" enough to make the audience re-watch it. UK Anime Network praised Hei's and Yin's journey. The reviewer said the narrative develops Hei further than both television series while adding more world-building and well-done animation.

Hei's characterization in Fujiwara's Shikkoku no Hana manga series was praised by Manga News and Manga Sanctuary for its complexity. His role in the finale against Harvest was also praised. The Hei portrayed in the other manga spin-off by Nokiya, however, was criticized by MangaLife as flat. Meanwhile, Comic Book Resources found Hei and Mao as one of the few interesting characters portrayed in Nokiya's manga in contrast to the manga exclusive ones.
