= List of My Teen Romantic Comedy SNAFU episodes =

My Teen Romantic Comedy SNAFU is a comedy, slice of life, drama Japanese anime series based on Wataru Watari's light novel series My Youth Romantic Comedy Is Wrong, as I Expected. Soubu High School is filled with many different types of teenagers all wanting to fit in. Despite preferring to be a loner, Hachiman Hikigaya is forced to join fellow loner, Yukino Yukinoshita and classmate, Yui Yuigahama in forming the Soubu High School Service Club. Also being linked by a car accident in the past, these three offer help to their fellow adolescents in dealing with the struggles and complicated psychology of being a teenager.The first season was produced by Brain's Base and directed by Ai Yoshimura, with series composition by Shōtarō Suga, character design by Yū Shindō, art direction by Shigemi Ikeda, music by Monaca, and sound direction by Satoshi Motoyama. The series premiered on April 5, 2013, on TBS with later airings on MBS, CBC, and BS-TBS. The twelve-episode season was followed by an extra thirteenth episode which aired on June 28, 2013, and an OVA episode on September 19, 2013, both of which were written by Watari.The second season, titled My Teen Romantic Comedy SNAFU Too!, was produced by Studio feel. and directed by Kei Oikawa, with series composition by Shōtarō Suga, character designs by Yuichi Tanaka, music by Monaca and sound direction by Satoshi Motoyama. The second season aired from April 3 to June 26, 2015, on TBS with later airings on MBS, CBC, TUT, and BS-TBS.The third and final season, titled My Teen Romantic Comedy SNAFU Climax, was also produced by Studio feel. and directed by Kei Oikawa, with series composition by Keiichirō Ōchi (replacing Suga), character designs by Yuichi Tanaka, music by Monaca, and sound direction by Satoshi Motoyama. The season was originally going to premiere on April 9, 2020, on TBS with later airings on MBS, CBC, and BS-TBS, and streaming on Amazon Prime Video, before being delayed to July 2020 due to the COVID-19 pandemic. The anime's production used a "trial and error" process that accounts for the safety of the production staff. The third season aired from July 9 to September 24, 2020.

== Series overview ==
Season	Episodes	Originally released	
Season	Episodes	First released	Last released
1	13	April 5, 2013	June 28, 2013
2	13	April 3, 2015	June 26, 2015
3	12	July 9, 2020	September 24, 2020

== Episodes ==
=== Season 1 (2013) ===
Story	Episode	Title (Note: All English titles are taken from Sentai Filmworks.)	Directed by	Written by	Original release date (Note: My Teen Romantic Comedy SNAFU was advertised as premiering primarily in TBS's Thursday 25:29 (1:29 am JST) time slot, so all episodes effectively aired the next calendar day.)	Ref.
1	1	"Youth Romantic Comedy Is Wrong, as I Expected"; Transliteration: "Kōshite Karera no Machigatta Seishun ga Hajimaru." (Japanese: こうして彼らのまちがった青春が始まる。)	Ai Yoshimura	Douko Machida	April 5, 2013	
2	2	"I'm Sure Everyone Bears A Worry of Equal Weight"; Transliteration: "Kitto, Dareshimo Hitoshi Nami ni Nayami o Kakaeteiru." (Japanese: きっと、誰しも等し並みに悩みを抱えている。)	Koji Aritomi	Douko Machida	April 12, 2013	
3	3	"Sometimes the God of Rom-Coms Smiles Upon You"; Transliteration: "Tamani Rabu Kome no Kami-sama wa ī Koto o Suru." (Japanese: たまにラブコメの神様はいいことをする。)	Kaoruhisa Iida	Douko Machida	April 19, 2013	
4	4	"Basically, He Has Few Friends"; Transliteration: "Tsumari, Kare wa Tomodachi ga Sukunai." (Japanese: つまり、彼は友達が少ない。)	Hideya Takahashi	Shōtarō Suga	April 26, 2013	
5	5	"And Again, He Returns from Whence He Came"; Transliteration: "Mata Shite mo, Kare wa Moto Kita Michi e Hikikaesu." (Japanese: またしても、彼は元来た道へ引き返す。)	Noriyuki Noi	Douko Machida	May 3, 2013	
6	6	"Finally, His and Her Beginning Have Ended"; Transliteration: "Yōyaku Kare to Kanojo no Hajimari ga Owaru." (Japanese: ようやく彼と彼女の始まりが終わる。)	Tomoyuki Kurokawa	Shōtarō Suga	May 10, 2013	
7	7	"Regardless, Not Getting a Break over Summer Break is Wrong"; Transliteration: "Tomoare, Natsuyasuminanoni Yasumenai no wa Nanikaokashī." (Japanese: ともあれ、夏休みなのに休めないのは何かおかしい。)	Tomoyuki Kawamura	Katsuhiko Takayama	May 17, 2013	
8	8	"One Day, They Shall Learn the Truth"; Transliteration: "Izure Karera Kanojora wa Shinjitsu o Shiru." (Japanese: いずれ彼ら彼女らは真実を知る。)	Hideaki Nakano	Katsuhiko Takayama	May 24, 2013	
9	9	"And Yet Again, He Returns from Whence He Came."; Transliteration: "Sando, Kare wa Moto Kita Michi e Hikikaesu." (Japanese: 三度、彼は元来た道へ引き返す。)	Hideya Takahashi	Shōtarō Suga	May 31, 2013	
10	10	"While They Remain As Distant As They Were, The Festival Shall Soon Encircle Us"; Transliteration: "Izentoshite Karera no Kyori wa Kawarazu ni, Matsuri wa Mōsugu Kānibaru." (Japanese: 依然として彼らの距離は変わらずに、祭りはもうすぐカーニバる。)	Risako Yoshida	Shōtarō Suga	June 7, 2013	
11	11	"And So, the Curtain on Each's Stage Rises, and The Festival Grows to a Feast on Us"; Transliteration: "Soshite, Sorezore no Butai no Maku ga Agari, Matsuri wa Saikō ni Fesutiba Tte Iru." (Japanese: そして、それぞれの舞台の幕が上がり、祭りは最高にフェスティバっている。)	Shunsuke Ishikawa	Katsuhiko Takayama	June 14, 2013	
12	12	"And So, His and Her and Her Youths Continue Being Wrong"; Transliteration: "Kōshite, Kare to Kanojo to Kanojo no Seishun wa Machigai Tsudzukeru." (Japanese: こうして、彼と彼女と彼女の青春はまちがい続ける。)	Ai Yoshimura	Shōtarō Suga	June 21, 2013	
13 (EX) (Note: Some international licensors such as Sentai Filmworks list this episode as the 13th, rather than its Japanese designation as an extra episode.)	13 (EX)	"And So, Their Festival Will Never End"; Transliteration: "Dakara, Karera no Matsuri wa Owaranai." (Japanese: だから、彼らの祭りは終わらない。)	Hideya Takahashi	Wataru Watari	June 28, 2013	

=== Season 2: Too! (2015) ===
Story	Episode	Title (Note: All English titles are taken from Sentai Filmworks.)	Directed by	Written by	Original release date (Note: My Teen Romantic Comedy SNAFU Too! was advertised as premiering in TBS's Thursday 25:51 (1:51 a.m. JST) time slot, so all episodes effectively aired the next calendar day.)	Ref.
14	1	"Nobody Knows Why They Came to the Service Club."; Transliteration: "Naze Karera ga Hōshi bu ni kita no ka Daremoshiranai." (Japanese: 何故、彼らが奉仕部に来たのか誰も知らない。)	Shuhei Matsushita	Shōtarō Suga	April 3, 2015	
15	2	"His and Her Confessions Won't Reach Anyone."; Transliteration: "Kare to Kanojo no Kokuhaku wa Darenimo Todokanai." (Japanese: 彼と彼女の告白は誰にも届かない。)	Satoshi Saga	Shōtarō Suga	April 10, 2015	
16	3	"Silently, Yukinoshita Yukino Makes Her Decision."; Transliteration: "Shizuka ni, Yukinoshita Yukino wa Ketsui Suru." (Japanese: 静かに、雪ノ下雪乃は決意する。)	Takashi Naotani	Keiichirō Ōchi	April 17, 2015	
17	4	"And Yuigahama Yui Makes Her Declaration."; Transliteration: "Soshite, Yuigahama Yui wa Sengen Suru." (Japanese: そして、由比ヶ浜結衣は宣言する。)	Yousuke Hashiguchi	Keiichirō Ōchi	April 24, 2015	
18	5	"The Scent of Tea No Longer Fills That Room."; Transliteration: "Sono heya ni wa, Kōcha no Kaori wa mō shi nai." (Japanese: その部屋には、紅茶の香りはもうしない。)	Yuuyuki Yanase	Keiichirō Ōchi	May 1, 2015	
19	6	"Without Incident, The Congress Dances, But Does Not Progress."; Transliteration: "Tsutsuganaku, Kaigi wa Odori, Saredo Susuma zu." (Japanese: つつがなく、会議は踊り、されど進まず。)	Masayuki Matsumoto	Shōtarō Suga	May 8, 2015	
20	7	"However, That Room Continues to Portray An Endless Everyday Scene."; Transliteration: "Saredo, Sono Heya wa Owara nu Nichijō o Enjitsuzukeru." (Japanese: されど、その部屋は終わらぬ日常を演じ続ける。)	Takashi Naotani	Shōtarō Suga	May 15, 2015	
21	8	"Even So, Hikigaya Hachiman."; Transliteration: "Soredemo, Hikigaya Hachiman wa." (Japanese: それでも、比企谷八幡は。)	Mitsuhiro Iwasaki	Keiichirō Ōchi	May 22, 2015	
22	9	"And So, Yukinoshita Yukino."; Transliteration: "Soshite, Yukinoshita Yukino wa." (Japanese: そして、雪ノ下雪乃は。)	Tomoya Takahashi	Keiichirō Ōchi	May 29, 2015	
23	10	"What the Lights In Each of Their Hands Illuminate."; Transliteration: "Sorezore no, Tenohira no Naka no Akari ga Terasu mono wa." (Japanese: それぞれの、掌の中の灯が照らすものは。)	Shuhei Matsushita	Shōtarō Suga	June 5, 2015	
24	11	"Each and Every Time, Hayama Hayato Lives Up to Expectations."; Transliteration: "Itsudemo, Hayama Hayato wa Kitai ni Kotae te iru." (Japanese: いつでも、葉山隼人は期待に応えている。)	Mitsuhiro Iwasaki	Keiichirō Ōchi	June 12, 2015	
25	12	"With the Answer He Seeks Still Out of Reach, The Real Thing He Craves Keeps Going Wrong."; Transliteration: "Imada, Kare no Motomeru Kotae ni wa te ga Todoka zu, Honmono wa Machigaitsuzukeru." (Japanese: 未だ、彼の求める答えには手が届かず、本物はまちがい続ける。)	Takashi Naotani	Keiichirō Ōchi	June 19, 2015	
26	13	"Spring Always Comes to Life Buried Underneath a Pile of Snow."; Transliteration: "Haru wa, Furitsumoru Yukinoshita nite Yuware, Mebukihajimeru." (Japanese: 春は、降り積もる雪の下にて結われ、芽吹き始める。)	Takashi Ikebata, Koji Kobayashi & Kei Oikawa	Keiichirō Ōchi	June 26, 2015	

=== Season 3: Climax (2020) ===
Story	Episode	Title (Note: All English titles are taken from Sentai Filmworks.)	Directed by	Written by	Original release date	Ref.
27	1	"In Due Time, the Seasons Change and the Snow Melts."; Transliteration: "Yagate, Kisetsu wa Utsuroi, Yuki wa Toke Yuku." (Japanese: やがて、季節は移ろい、雪は解けゆく。)	Kei Oikawa	Keiichirō Ōchi	July 9, 2020	
28	2	"That Key Was Never Handled Until Today."; Transliteration: "Kyō made, Sono Kagi ni wa Ichi Domo Fureta Koto ga nai." (Japanese: 今日まで、その鍵には一度も触れたことがない。)	Shōhei Yamanaka	Keiichirō Ōchi	July 16, 2020	
29	3	"Iroha Isshiki is the Strongest Junior, as Expected."; Transliteration: "Yahari, Isshiki Iroha wa Saikyō no Kōhai de aru." (Japanese: やはり、一色いろはは最強の後輩である。)	Ryutarō Suzuki	Keiichirō Ōchi	July 23, 2020	
30	4	"By Chance, Yui Yuigahama Thinks of the Future."; Transliteration: "Futo, Yuigahama Yui wa Mirai ni Omoi o Haseru." (Japanese: ふと、由比ヶ浜結衣は未来に思いを馳せる。)	Shota Imai	Keiichirō Ōchi	July 30, 2020	
31	5	"Shizuka Hiratsuka Deeply Longs for the Days Past."; Transliteration: "Shimijimi to, Hiratsuka Shizuka wa Itsuka no Mukashi o Natsukashimu." (Japanese: しみじみと、平塚静はいつかの昔を懐かしむ。)	Shuntarō Tozawa	Keiichirō Ōchi	August 6, 2020	
32	6	"Once again, Hachiman Hikigaya Makes a Speech."; Transliteration: "Aratamete, Hikigaya Hachiman Yahata wa Katarikakeru." (Japanese: あらためて、比企谷八幡はかたりかける。)	Shota Imai	Keiichirō Ōchi	August 13, 2020	
33	7	"Until the End, Yui Yuigahama Will Continue Watching Over Them."; Transliteration: "Saigo made, Yuigahama Yui wa Mimamoritsuzukeru." (Japanese: 最後まで、由比ヶ浜結衣は見守り続ける。)	Shōhei Yamanaka	Keiichirō Ōchi	August 20, 2020	
34	8	"Wishing That, At the Very Least I Don't Make Any More Mistakes."; Transliteration: "Semete, mō Machigaetakunai to Negai Nagara." (Japanese: せめて、もうまちがえたくないと願いながら。)	Ryutarō Suzuki	Keiichirō Ōchi	August 27, 2020	
35	9	"A Whiff of that Fragrance Will Always Bring Memories of that Season."; Transliteration: "Kitto, Sono Kaori o Kagu Tabi ni, Omoidasu Kisetsu ga aru." (Japanese: きっと、その香りをかぐたびに、思い出す季節がある。)	Taisuke Tsukuda	Keiichirō Ōchi	September 3, 2020	
36	10	"Gallantly, Shizuka Hiratsuka Moves Forward."; Transliteration: "Sassō to, Hiratsuka Shizuka wa Mae o Aruku." (Japanese: 颯爽と、平塚静は前を歩く。)	Tatsuya Sasaki	Keiichirō Ōchi	September 10, 2020	
37	11	"Only a Heated Touch Truly Conveys the Sentiment."; Transliteration: "Omoi wa, Fureta Netsu Dakega Tashikani Tsutaeteiru." (Japanese: 想いは、触れた熱だけが確かに伝えている。)	Ryutarō Suzuki	Keiichirō Ōchi	September 17, 2020	
38	12	"My Teen Romantic Comedy is Wrong, As I Expected."; Transliteration: "Yahari Ore no Seishun Rabukome wa Machigatteiru." (Japanese: やはり俺の青春ラブコメはまちがっている。)	Tatsuya Sasaki	Keiichirō Ōchi	September 24, 2020	

== OVAs ==
No.	Title	Directed by	Written by	Original release date	Ref.
1	"There's No Choice but to Wish Them Happiness Right Here as They Arrive at Their Destiny."; Transliteration: "Kochira Toshite mo Karera Kanojora no Yukusue ni Sachiōkaran Koto o Negawazaru o Enai." (Japanese: こちらとしても彼ら彼女らの行く末に幸多からんことを願わざるを得ない。)	Yuusuke Onoda	Wataru Watari	September 19, 2013	
One morning, Hachiman ponders on the true nature of marriage and comes to the conclusion that people inevitably deceive themselves into thinking it makes them happy. Shizuka later tasks the Service Club with writing articles for submission to a local municipal magazine, which detail how contemporary teenagers view the institution of marriage. The Service Club accept the request and after brainstorming about research ideas, they decide to draft some surveys and take a sample from the persons remaining in the school. However the results only further emphasize the inexperience of their peers and Yukino decides to enlist Komachi for assistance after deducing that taking care of Hachiman would be the same as a marriage. Komachi arrives and suggests that they refocus the research on the traits of a good housewife and then has Yukino, Yui, Shizuka and herself draw information from various contests, including displays of cooking skills, reactions to hypothetical scenarios and a bridal dress contest. Finally, the Service Club takes their findings home and despite lagging behind Yui and Yukino with the workload, Hachiman writes that while people may not be able to prepare for the hardships of marriage—everyone has a right to wish for happiness.
2	"Undoubtedly, Girls Are Made of Sugar, Spice, and Everything Nice."; Transliteration: "Kitto, Onna no Ko wa Osatō to Spice to Suteki na Nanika de Dekiteiru." (Japanese: きっと、女の子はお砂糖とスパイスと素敵な何かでできている。)	Mitsuhiro Iwasaki	Keiichirō Ōchi	October 27, 2016	
Isshiki makes Hachiman come with her on a "date", to brainstorm date idea's Hayama might like. They play ping pong, see a movie, eat dinner as well as go for dessert. Afterwards, Isshiki concedes she had fun. The next day Isshiki asks the Service Club to find more date spots for a student newsletter. She gives them a camera to take pictures of good spots. On Hachiman's next free day he accompanies Yui and Yukino to look around for places students would enjoy. When at school Isshiki approves of all the photos the Service Club took. She also decides to take a photo of the Service Club as thanks and because they will need one for the yearbook. Note: This episode takes place before Too! episode 13.
3	"Regardless, Adolescence Doesn't End, And Youth Continues On."; Transliteration: "Dakara, shishunki wa owarazu ni, seishun wa tsudzuite iku" (Japanese: だから、思春期は終わらずに、 青春は続いていく。)	Shouta Imai	Wataru Watari	April 27, 2023	
