= Darker than Black: Gemini of the Meteor =

Japanese anime television series

- Darker Than Black ー流星の双子ー; Dākā Zan Burakku ーRyūsei no Jeminiー
- Type: TV series
- Genre: Action; Science fiction; Supernatural
- Created by: Bones; Tensai Okamura
- Directed by: Tensai Okamura
- Character designer: Takahiro Komori
- Music by: Yasushi Ishii
- Opening theme: "Tsukiakari no Michishirube" by Stereopony
- Ending theme: "From Dusk Till Dawn" by Abingdon Boys School
- No. of episodes: 12 (list of episodes)

Production
- Art director: Takashi Aoi
- Sound director: Kazuhiro Wakabayashi
- Cinematographer: Gō Kanbayashi
- Color designer: Nobuko Mizuta
- CG director: Kōki Ōta
- Studio: Bones
- Producers: Hiroo Maruyama; Ryou Ooyama; Yoshihiro Ooyabu
- Production companies: DTB Production Committee (Note: Label consisting of various companies); MBS
- Runtime: 24 minutes

Original release
- Networks: JNN (MBS, TBS)
- Release: 9 October – 25 December 2009

Darker than Black: Gemini of the Meteor (Japanese: Darker Than Black ー流星の双子ー, Hepburn: Dākā Zan Burakku ーRyūsei no Jeminiー) is a Japanese anime series directed by Tensai Okamura and produced by Bones. It is a sequel to the 2007 series Darker than Black, and most of the crew returned for the production. The series premiered on MBS, TBS and their affiliated stations on 8 October 2009. The sequel follows Suo Pavlichenko, a Russian girl whose life is changed by a frightening incident surrounding a meteor shower, and her encounter with the assassin Hei; the man is searching for her twin, Shion, and his missing partner Yin.

Okamura conceived the series, which was inspired by his previous experience working on Soul Eater. Okamura created the heroine Suo, and asked for help from the writers, particularly Mari Okada, in presenting the character to an increasingly-female audience. The series was gathered in on DVD and Blu-ray format in Japan with original video animations that explain the event that occur between both Darker than Black series, Gaiden. The series and OVAs were released in North America by Funimation, by Manga Entertainment in the United Kingdom, and by Madman Entertainment in Australia.

Gemini of the Meteor's storyline received a mixed response by the media for its handling of the now-darker Hei; the audience does not know according to the reviews what changed his characterization unless it saw Darker than Black: Gaiden. Its plot development and action scenes were praised for retaining the original Darker than Black's appeal. Suo was considered a suitable protagonist, not only for her role in the series but also because her relationship with Hei. Original composer Yoko Kanno was replaced by Yasushi Ishii, and critics were divided about which composer was more entertaining. The musical themes and the inclusion of original video animations in the English-language release were well received.

== Plot ==
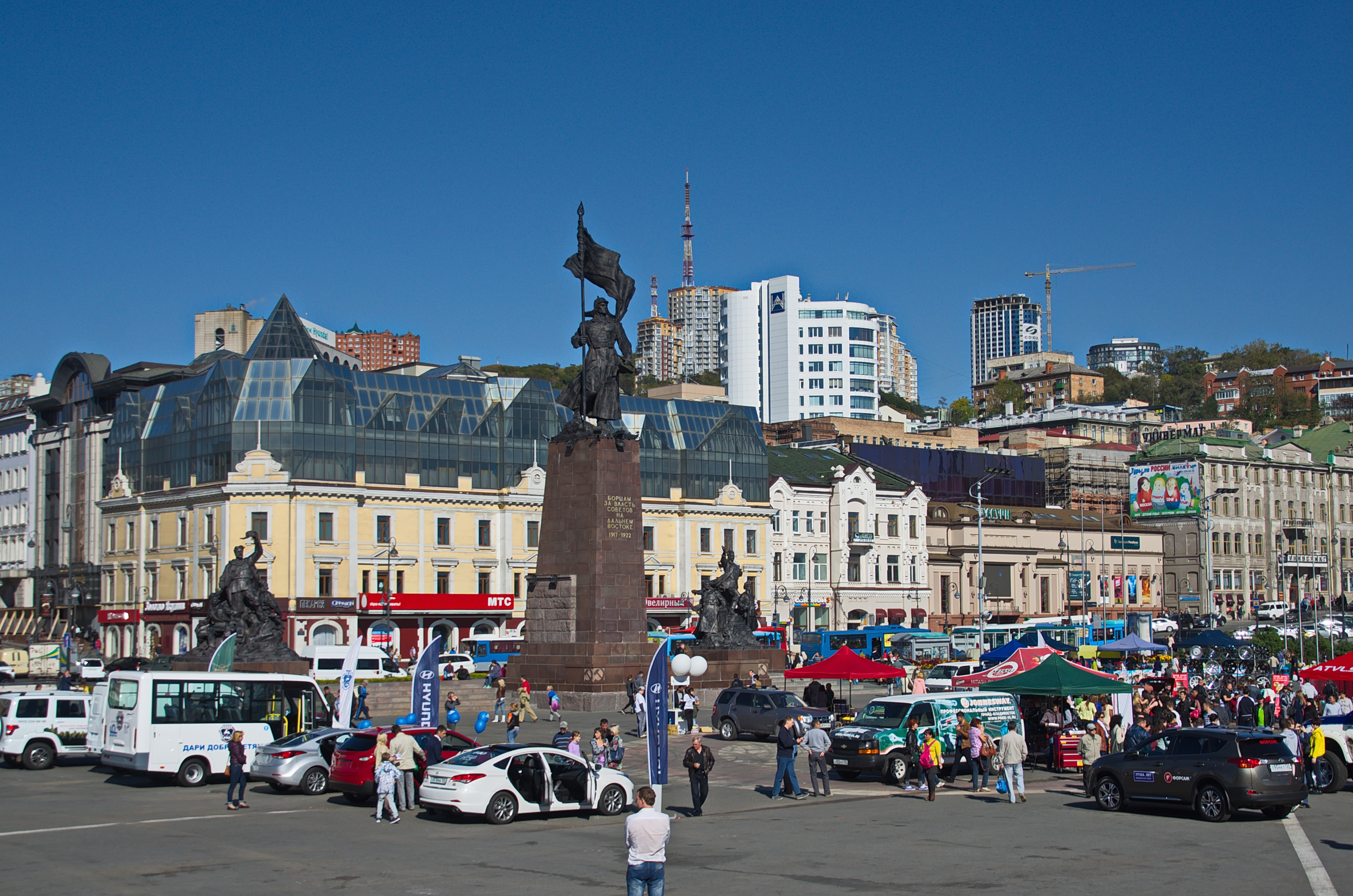
Early episodes are set in Vladivostok, which Bones researched for its animation.

The series follows Suo Pavlichenko: a young Eurasian girl from Vladivostok who lives with her father, Dr. Mikhail Pavlichenko, and her twin brother Shion. Before the series's start, Shion developed supernatural powers which turned him into a calm Contractor but put him in a wheelchair. An assassin Contractor known as Hei attacks their house, killing Mikhail and attacking Suo (whom he mistakes for Shion) on a mission to retrieve a remnant of a supernatural stone. Suo escapes from Hei, and publicizes a photograph revealing his location. The Ministry of Internal Affairs and Communications's Section 3, also seeking the missing Shion, briefly fight Hei. Hei defeats Section 3, but is trapped in an area which neutralizes his Contractor powers. Suo sees a meteor explosion, and has a vision of a younger Hei running towards Yin. Mao (a former ally of Hei) rescues Suo, and they escape from Section 3.

Hei decides to train Suo to defend, and she becomes a Contractor, though she still retains her humanity, unwilling to kill anybody. Hei brings Mao and a former Secret Intelligence Service agent code-named July to Tokyo to find Shion and Yin, who has become a killer. On the trip Hei bonds with Suo, who decides to follow his lead. As they got closer, she made a deal with him that she will not kill anyone in exchange for Hei to stops drinking. They are tricked by an informant into nearly killing Yin, who was sealed in a machine. Suo learns from her mother in Tokyo that she is a copy of the original Suo, who died in an assassination attempt against her father years ago and Shion used his powers to create another Suo after the meteor impact. It was also through this power of creating clones that Shion created a copy of their father, who was killed by Hei back in Vladivostok. Shion is known by several organizations as Izanagi, the counterpart of Izanami which has possessed Yin; Izanagi and Izanami must not be reunited as it might lead to an apocalyptic event. Suo reunites with her real father, who then dies in an encounter with Section 3 soldiers. Hei kidnaps a scientist from Section 3 to learn Yin's whereabouts.

In the series finale, Hei is spared by Section 3 because they need him to kill Izanami. Suo reunites with Shion, who has used all his lifespan to create a replica of the earth so Izanami's victims can live a normal life. After Shion dies, Izanami erases Suo's mind; Hei stops her from killing Izanami in self-defense, and comforts her until her memories are erased. Hei then recovers his Contractor powers and confronts Izanami; Yin wants Hei to kill her. And then Suo's mind is transported to Shion's alternate world, where she can live a normal life with July. Hei and the rest of Section 3 protect Izanami from American forces after they launch a military operation to secure the Greater Tokyo Area for the U.S. Hei is last seen walking with Yin's body; her fate is ambiguous, although director Tensai Okamura suggested that it might be tragic.

== Production ==
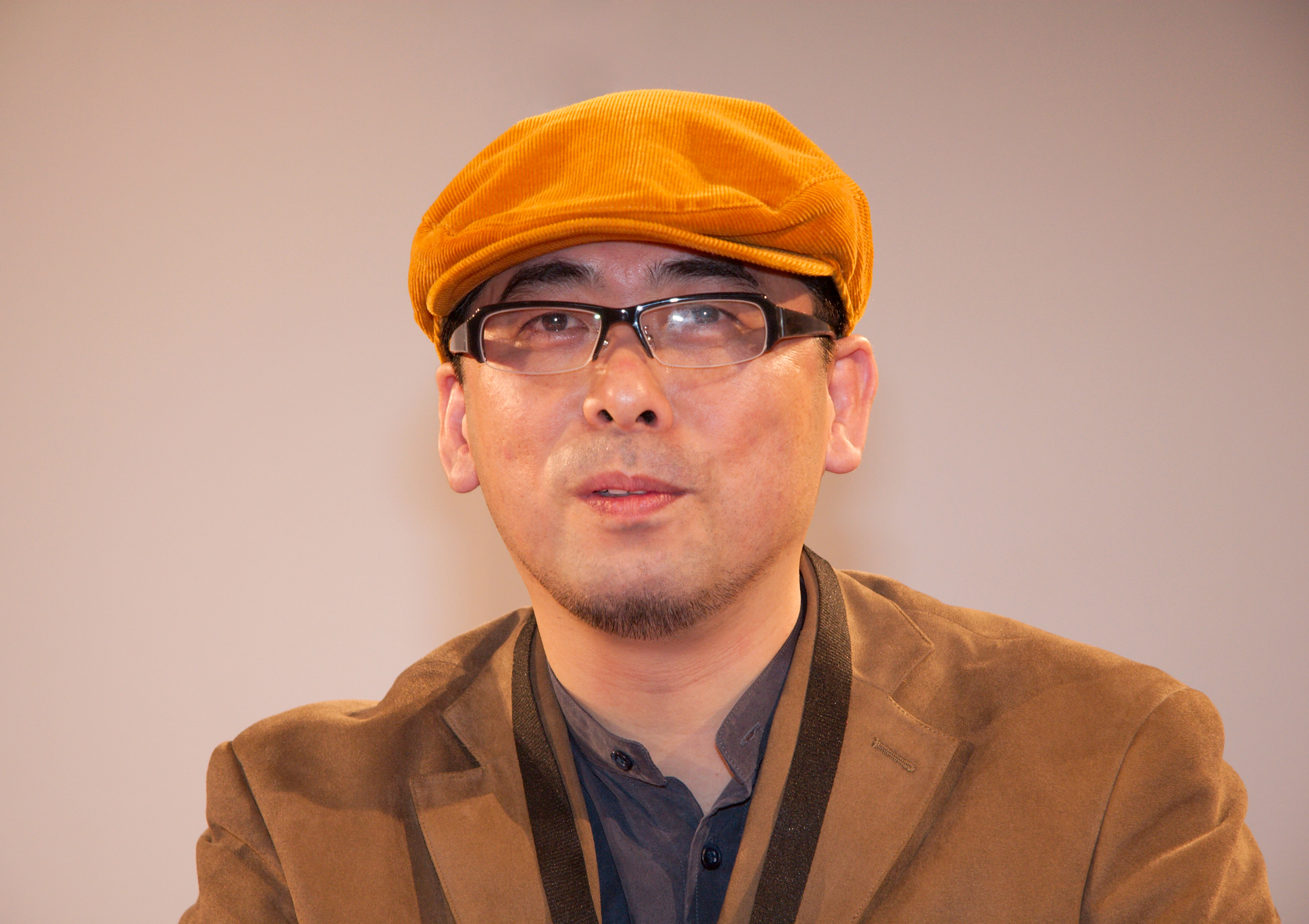
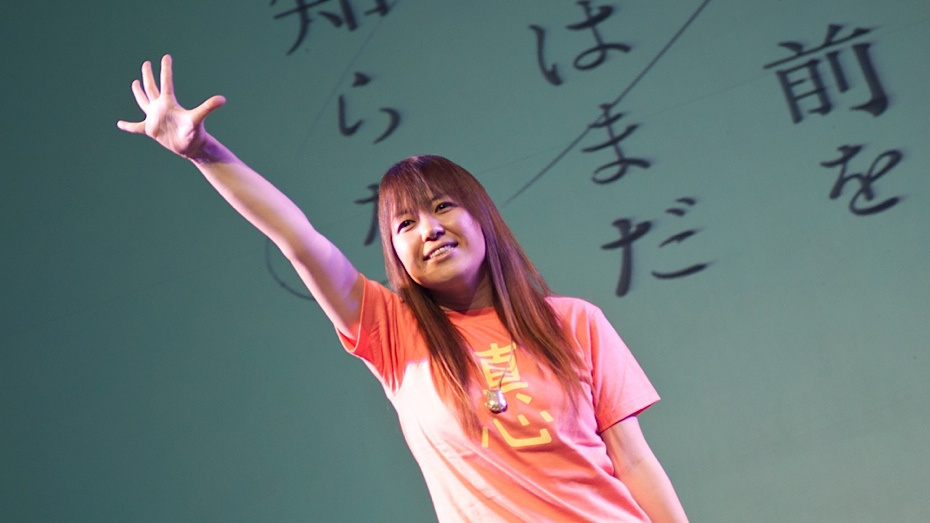
While Tensai Okamura returned to direct Darker than Black: Gemini of the Meteor, writer Mari Okada was in charge of several episodes to appeal to the female audience.

The series was first hinted by the Bones' staff in July 2008. In a statement on Bones' website, co-founder and president Masahiko Minami said "It hasn't been decided yet. We are interested in doing them. As original science-fiction works, they were extremely fascinating. With these kinds of dramatic story lines, I feel that there's a lot we could do potentially." The second Darker than Black series was confirmed in the 12th issue of Square Enix's Young Gangan magazine in June 2009, and its first trailer appeared in August in that year.

In Gemini of the Meteor, Okamura considered diverging from the previous season. Okamura, who found the first series's narrative confusing and rough, wanted to change the series's tone; Suo was created in contrast to Hei. Okamura hoped that the changes would appeal to new viewers, who would then understand the first season. The sequel added new science-fiction elements, such as the alternate world where Suo lives. A Vladivostok high school model was designed as a building for the series.

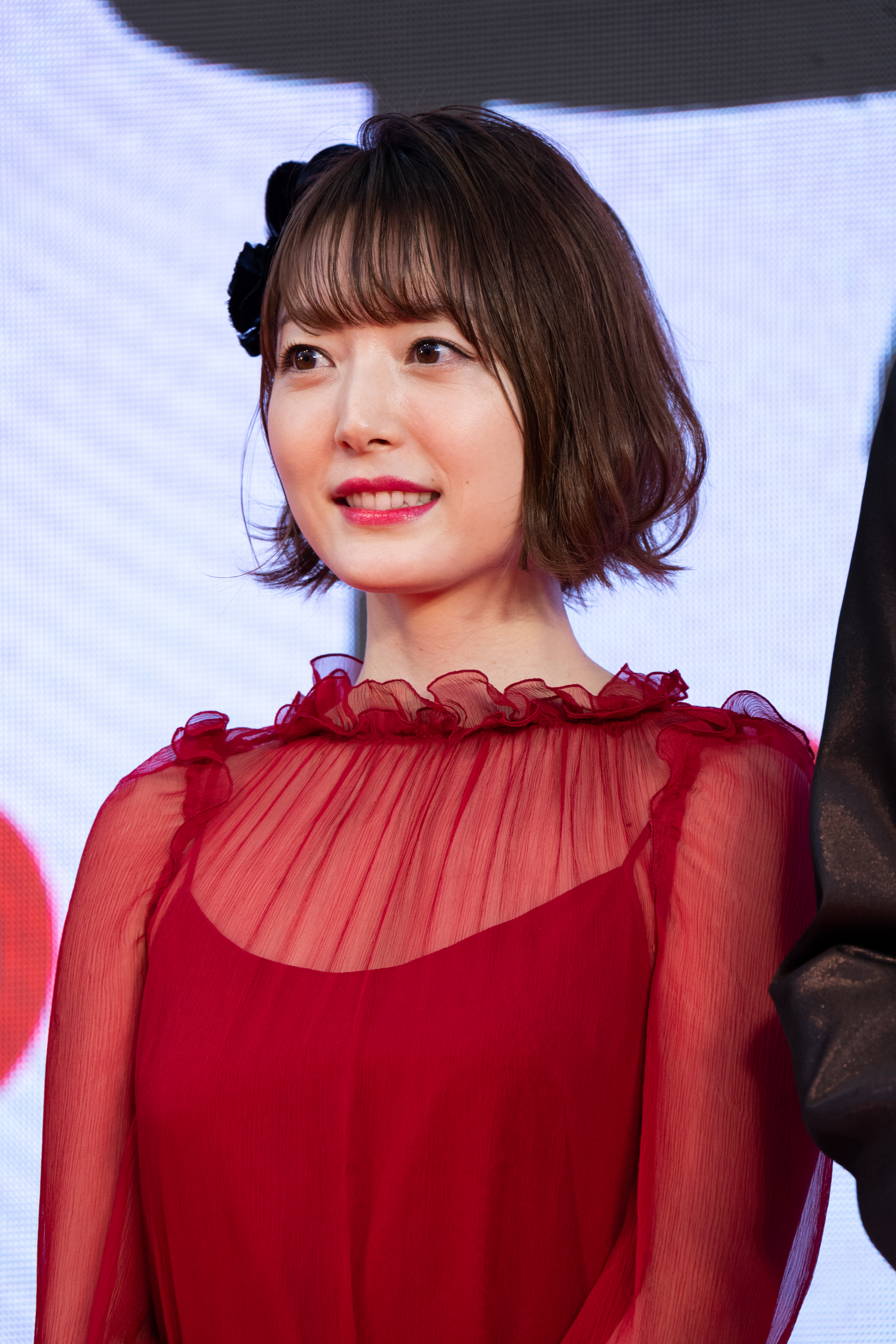
Kana Hanazawa voiced Suo in Japanese

For the second season, the production committee provided 12 episodes and four OVAs. Okamura wanted more scope and a different style; he wanted the protagonist to be a girl after reading the Darker than Black manga. When he helped draw the storyboard for Soul Eater, he was attracted to the concept of a little girl with a giant weapon. Bones obtained Mari Okada and Hiroyuki Yoshino as new writers to form a writing team which shared ideas together and used their strengths. There was no head writer, although it had been originally decided that Yoshino would take the role. The four OVAs were made for returning fans who wanted to see what happened after the first series, and became a series complementing Gemini of the Meteor. Due to Okada's experience with shōjo manga, the series targeted a female demographic and she was put in charge of several episodes because Suo was the new protagonist. Okamura was behind Shion's creation of a replica planet. Hei's design was altered in Gemini of the Meteor in the form of longer hair and facial hair which Okamura enjoyed. However, this appearance was not popular within the female staff members. By the ninth episode, it was decided to revise Hei's design again under the hands of animator Hitomi Nadashima who animated such scene of Hei changing his look. Yin, originally a minor character from the first series, was found fit to be center of attention by the director for the narrative, representing the Dolls presented across the two series.

Although there were only two years between both Darker than Black series, Hei's voice actor Hidenobu Kiuchi found the character challenging because of his personality change. Kiuchi felt that Hei was a far darker character due to an unknown incident. The actor said that Hei is notably strict with younger lead Suo Pavlichenko, and he wished that the character would eventually exhibit more caring behavior to the teenager. Kiuchi called Hei one of his favorite roles, and hoped that the audience to look forward to Gemini of the Meteor. Kana Hanazawa felt that Suo's love for her family is the strongest part of her character. Every time Hanazawa received a script, she looked forward to enjoying the experience. Hanazawa describes her as a lively and innocent androgynous girl. She feels that her strong family love is what makes her strong. The actress was inspired by her own high school years in voicing Suo in order to blend into the atmosphere. Every time she received a script, Hanazawa was excited that it will develop like due to multiple possibilities involving Suo's fate.

=== Music ===
The soundtrack for Gemini of the Meteor was released in Japan on 23 December 2009 by Aniplex. Its twenty tracks include short versions of the opening and closing themes. Yasushi Ishii replaced Kanno on the sequel and the OVAs, and considers Darker than Black and Hellsing his favorite works. Ishii described the second season as like the darkness before the dawn, a harsh battlefield, and used hard rock, electronic and experimental music in the soundtrack.

The series's opening theme song is ("Tsukiakari no Michishirube" (ツキアカリのミチシルベ; lit. 'Guidepost of the Moonlight')), performed by Stereopony, who said that it evokes everyday anxiety and despair. The closing theme ("From Dusk Till Dawn") is performed by Abingdon Boys School, who had played the opening theme for Darker than Black. According to vocalist Takanori Nishikawa, the closing theme expresses great affection in a short time. Both "Tsukiakari no Michishirube" and "From Dusk Till Dawn" were popular with the former appearing in Oricon rankings, while the latter sold 22,923 copies in Japan.

=== Release ===
The series began to be released on eight DVD and Blu-ray volumes by Aniplex in Japan from 23 December 2009 to 21 July 2010. Each odd-numbered volume contains two series episodes; an OVA episode, known as Darker than Black: Gaiden, was released with one series episode in each even-numbered volume. The four OVA episodes are side-stories about the main characters, Hei and his partner Yin, set between the two seasons. Hei's backstory is told, and the awakening of Yin's alter ego is explored. A Blu-ray box set was released by Aniplex on 15 January 2014.

On 2 July 2010, Funimation announced at Anime Expo that it had licensed the second season. Funimation released the series on DVD and Blu-ray on 8 November 2011. Madman Entertainment released the series as a compilation in Australia on 14 December 2011, and Manga Entertainment in the United Kingdom on 26 December of that year. The series was re-released by Funimation on 12 May 2015. The rights to the series second expired in 2018.

== Reception ==
Reviewers criticized Hei and Yin's lack of closure for leaving the story on a cliffhanger with no explanation of whether Hei killed his friend

The home media releases, including the Blu-ray box set, were successful in Japan. In preparation for Gemini of Meteor, Theron Martin of Anime News Network and Fandom Post suggested first watching the original video animation Gaiden to explore Hei and Yin's relationship and how Hei became a depressed alcoholic after losing Yin. Hei has often been regarded as a surprisingly dark character. Suo has been seen as an appealing protagonist, cheerful and bright despite her chaotic history. Although Hei mentors Suo, Martin found that she makes Hei superfluous. The Fandom Post also found Hei a less-appealing character than Suou, noting that Hei makes fewer appearances in the sequels. Comic Book Bin compared them with the leads in the 1994 film Léon: The Professional, due to the bond they form while training. According to Anime UK News, the narrative progressed well thanks to its action sprinkled with comedy. An Active Anime reviewer said that the series retained most of the first series appealing features, including Hei and Suo's many problems and the buildup to an apocalyptic prophecy. DVD Talk said that although Okamura animated major action scenes, the narrative was hard for new viewers to follow and the director's deep themes were wasted. Hei and Suo's rocky relationship upset a Fandom Post reviewer, as Hei attacks Suo's family; the OVAs help explore Hei's downfall during his journey with Yin, although he remains an action hero. The review praised the dark plot and its many twists involving Suo. About.com also enjoyed the plot twists, but found the series's short length disappointing; however, the action scenes and narrative were as appealing as Darker than Black. In The Anime Encyclopedia by Jonathan Clements and Helen McCarthy, Gemini of the Meteor was considered as consistent as the first series and Gaiden and is an outstanding trilogy.

Although Suo's story ends in the finale, Hei's journey remains undefined. According to Crunchyroll and Anime News Network, fans wanted a new season of the series after the end of Gemini of the Meteor and were disappointed when SNK used its series rights to make a pachinko instead. An Active Anime review said that although the ending resolved most of the series's questions, it left some unanswered. Hidenobu Kiuchi, Hei's Japanese voice actor, asked fans in 2010 if they would enjoy a new Darker than Black anime after Gemini of the Meteor; they said they would. In the Animage's Anime Grand Prix awards from 2009, Gemini of the Meteor was listed as the 10th best series of the year.

Yasushi Ishii's score in the sequel was praised with "From Dusk Till Dawn", the closing theme by Abingdon Boys School. However, DVD Talk found Ishii's score inferior to Yoko Kanno's in the first series. In an Anime News Network poll, "Tsukiakari no Michishirube" was one of 2009's best opening themes. Active Anime agreed, but found Kanno's score superior to Isshi's. The English-language cast was thought superior to the original Japanese cast; Anime News Network noted that Alison Viktorin was realistic as a teenager despite her age. Hanazawa's performance as Suo was also well received by fans. Capsule Monsters found both language versions enjoyable, and praised the soundtrack for accommodating a variety of scenes. According to a Fandom Post review, viewers might be put off by the talkiness of the Japanese version. An Anime UK News reviewer enjoyed the soundtrack and "From Dusk Till Dawn".
