= Suo Pavlichenko =

Character in Darker than Black: Gemini of the Meteor

- Darker than Black character
- Promotional illustration for Suo Pavlichenko
- First appearance: Darker than Black: Gemini of the Meteor episode 1: "Black Cats Do Not Dream of Stars" (October 9, 2009)
- Created by: Tensai Okamura
- Designed by: Yuji Iwahara
- Voiced by: Kana Hanazawa (Japanese); Alison Viktorin (English)

In-universe information
- Gender: Female
- Relatives: Shion Pavlichenko (younger twin brother)

Suo Pavlichenko (Japanese: 蘇芳・パブリチェンコ, Hepburn: Suō Paburichenko) is a fictional character introduced in the anime series Darker than Black: Gemini of the Meteor. A young teenage girl, Suo is an upbeat Eurasian photographer who lives alongside her father while aiming to protect her twin brother, Shion, who is a Contractor, a human with supernatural powers. One day, the Pavlichenko family is attacked by the assassin Hei, who wants a piece of a meteor Shion is hiding. He ends up taking her under his hand during a mayhem caused by Section 3, who also seek Shion. Despite hating Hei, Suo goes along with his plans and soon ends up awakening her own powers. The character has also appeared in the video game Heroes Phantasia.

Suo was created by anime director Tensai Okamura, who aimed to create a different type of protagonist after ending the first Darker than Black anime. After being inspired by the series Soul Eater, Okamura sought the help of writer Mari Okada who was more experienced with writing female characters. Suo Pavlichenko is voiced by Kana Hanazawa in Japanese and Alison Viktorin in English.

Initial critical response to Suo's character was divisive as reviewers for manga and anime publications found fans often labeled Suo as a moe archetype as well as a magical girl based on her characterization and powers. However, reviews focused on the series were positive due to how Suo fit into the dark scenario properly thanks to her likable personality and developed an appealing relationship with Hei. The two voice actress were also well received.

== Creation ==
In the anime Darker than Black: Gemini of the Meteor, director Tensai Okamura considered diverging from the previous season which would lead to the creation of Suo. Okamura, who found the first series' narrative confusing and Hei rough, wanted to change the series' tone; Suo was created to contrast with Hei. Okamura hoped that the changes would appeal to new viewers, who would then watch the first season. Okamura wanted the protagonist to be a girl after reading the Darker than Black manga. When he helped draw the storyboard for Soul Eater, he was attracted to the concept of a little girl with a giant weapon. Bones, the animation studio behind Darker than Black, obtained Mari Okada and Hiroyuki Yoshino as new writers to form a writing team which shared ideas together and used their strengths. Due to Okada's experience with shojo works, the series targeted a female demographic and she was put in charge of several episodes because Suo was the new protagonist. Okamura was behind Shion's creation of a replica and how in the second half it is revealed that Shion was the one who created Suo.

Kana Hanazawa felt that Suo's love for her family is the strongest part of her character. Every time Hanazawa received a script, she looked forward to enjoying the experience. Hanazawa describes her as a lively and innocent androgynous girl. She feels that her strong family love is what makes her strong. The actress was inspired by her own high school years in voicing Suo in order to blend into the atmosphere. Every time she received a script, Hanazawa was excited that it will develop like due to multiple possibilities involving Suo's fate.

== Appearances ==
Suo Pavlichenko appears in the anime Darker than Black: Gemini of the Meteor as a 13-year-old girl who lives in Vladivostok, Russia. She also has a twin brother, Shion, whom she wants to protect despite him being a Contractor who lacks feelings. Early in the series, she witness two classmates who form a romantic relationship but one of them, Tanya, loses her emotions as she becomes a Contractor when confronting Nika. During such events, Suo becomes involved in the war and machinations between the various groups and Contractors, and her life is forever changed when she meets Hei. Hei attacks the Pavlichenko family, killing Suo's father but confuses the girl from Shion. Suo manages to escape in order to get revenge but in the next encounter with Hei, Suo is chased by the Ministry of Internal Affairs and Communications's Section 3 who are also seeking the missing Shion. Through seeing Tanya killing Nika, Suo awakens her own Contractor ability when she goes into mental shock. She obtains the ability to manifest an anti-tank rifle (PTRD) from a meteor fragment she wears as a pendant, and can wield the rifle easily despite its heavy weight of the weapon and powerful recoil; however, even though the weapon comes with its own ammunition each time it is created, the wear and tear on it remains, so Suo must maintain it like any other gun. The payment for her power is to fold origami.

Although Suo develops Contractor powers, she is still against the idea of using them to kill the enemy. Hei teaches her self defense and both build a friendly relationship after taking in the Doll July, who is a human lacking feelings. During fights against Tanya, Suo is aided by Shion to kill the enemy with Hei believing it was self defense. As she bonds with Hei, Suo once again notices the specter of Yin chasing him. After meeting her mother, Suo discovers that she is actually a 'copy' of the original Suo, who died in an explosion many years ago, created by Shion's power. Although her mother is afraid of seeing her daughter's replica, Hei still accepts what she is, making her realize her own feelings which Mao finds interesting despite Contractors lacking emotions in general. After reuniting with Shion, Suo learns of how Shion implanted her fake memories to lead a normal life which Suo treasures. However, shortly afterwards, Hei's ally Yin, a Doll who has been absorbing people's souls, awakens and takes October and Shion's souls. Suo finds herself conflicted to kill Yin as she starts losing her memories but Hei stops her and comforts her until her apparent death. Suo appears to die after the meteor fragment she is carrying breaks. Later, it is revealed that she has been transported to an alternate world without Contractors (including her brother), where she can live a normal life, with no memory of her previous one as she wonders if she lost something important.

Outside the anime, the character is also present in Heroes Phantasia, a crossover role-playing game as a playable character, and makes a minor appearance in an omake from the series' second fanbook in a what-if scenario where Suo, Yin, and Misaki Kirihara prepare a meal for Hei.

== Reception ==
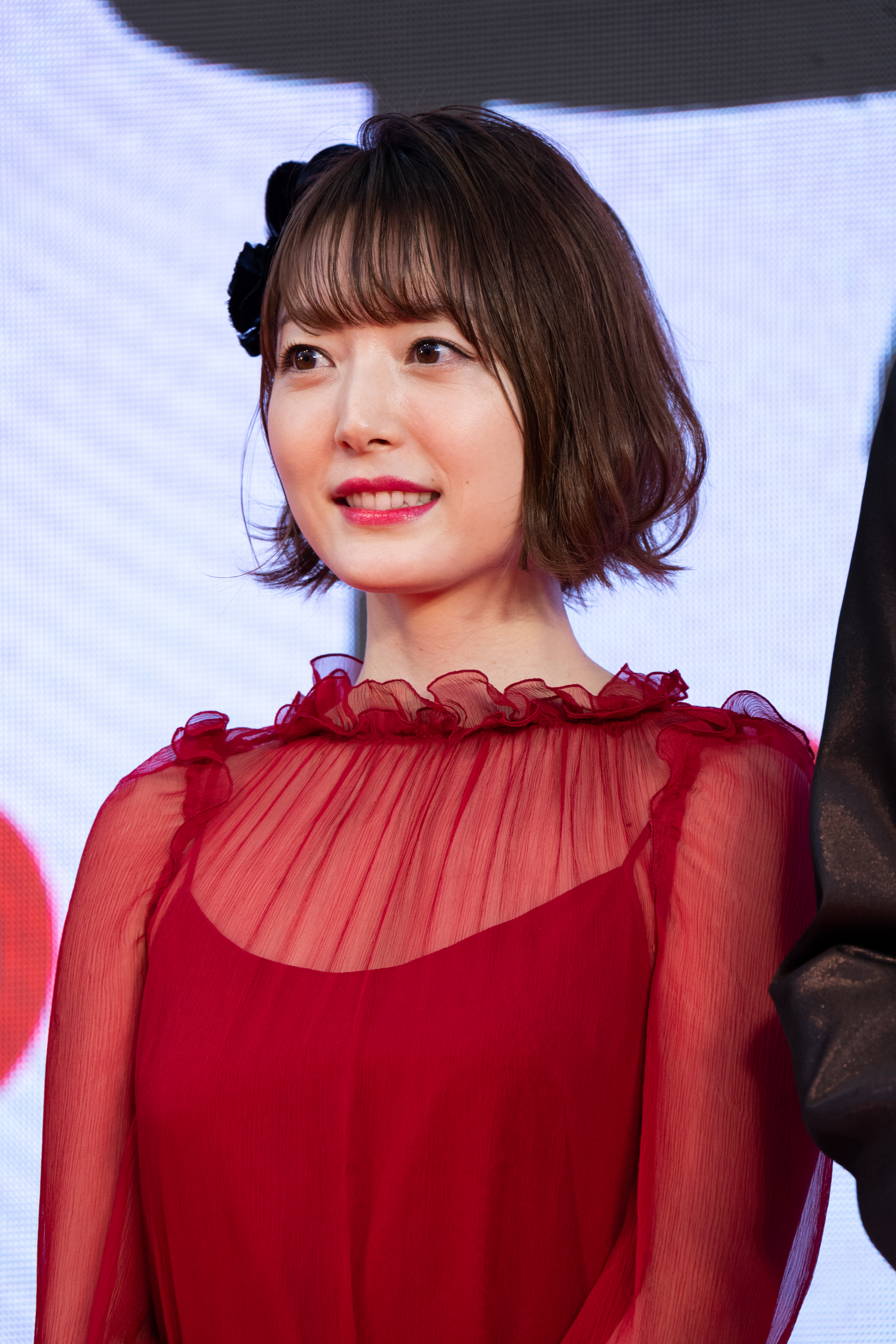
Kana Hanazawa voices Suo in Japanese.

Early impressions from Darker than Black: Gemini of the Meteor led the media to call Suo moe due to her innocent characterization. Nevertheless, Carlo Santos from Anime News Network praised the dynamic between the series premiere involving Suo's daily life with the more dramatic events that happen from her point of view, while Theron Martin said that she makes a good addition to the series due to how her lively world changes upon meeting Contractors. Screen Rant also listed Suo as the second best character from Darker than Black behind Hei due to her dynamic with the previous lead and growth across Gemini of the Meteor. In a poll by Anime News Network, readers voted Suo and Shion as one of the best twins ever seen in manga and anime. Fandom Post noted that Suo's traits involving her Contractor powers, pet possessed by Mao, and sequences during fights might bother the audience who believe her to be a magical girl, she is instead, her role in the series, interaction with Hei and fight scenes instead make her come across as a suitable character. While compared with the magical girl Utena Tenjou from Revolutionary Girl Utena based on her usage of powers, About.com found her characterization as unique among Contractors as she retains the memories of a typical teenage girl in contrast to other Contractors. My Reviewer found the action sequences involving Suo's weaponry appealing based on the way it is animated but still felt them to be out of place when compared with other powers seen across the series. Suo was also present in the Anime Saimoe Tournament from 2010 where the audience voted the most appealing moe characters.

Suo has been seen as an appealing protagonist, cheerful and bright despite her chaotic history. An Active Anime reviewer said that the series retained most of the prequel's appealing features, including Hei and Suo's many problems and the buildup to an apocalyptic prophecy. Although Hei mentors Suo, Martin found that she makes Hei superfluous. The Fandom Post also found Hei a less-appealing character than Suou, noting that Hei makes fewer appearances in the sequels. A Comic Book Bin reviewer compared their relationship to Léon (Jean Reno) and Mathilda Lando (Natalie Portman), the leads in the 1994 film Léon: The Professional, due to the bond they form while training while also highlighting how properly Suo adapts to the anime's dark scenario despite not initially looking fitting for such role. UK Anime Network had mixed feelings about the closure given to Suo's role in Gemini of the Meteor but better developed in contrast to Hei's own story that leaves the series on a cliffhanger. Capsule Monsters referred to Suo as "a simple girl who loves photography [who turns] into a woman coming to grips with her new abilities", as her character arc comes across as interesting even though viewer might be bothered by her overshadowing Hei. About.com praised Suo's meeting with her mother, not only for the emotional impact, but also for a subsequent plot twist related with Shion that reveals that the real Suo is dead and the current one is instead a clone.

There was also a focus on the character's voice actors. Anime News Network noted that Alison Viktorin was realistic as a teenager despite her age. Kana Hanazawa's performance as Suo was also well received by fans as noted by the staff in charge of the series during one event. JT Online commented that Hanazawa's work was appealing as she "really brings out the emotion and pain out of Suo quite effectively" to the point of referring to her as one of the best Japanese voice actress behind the series.
