= Darker than Black: Gaiden =

Japanese OVA series

- Promotional illustration featuring Yin and Hei

Darker than Black 黒の契約者 外伝 (Dākā Zan Burakku Gaiden)
- Genre: Action; Mystery; Supernatural
- Created by: Bones; Tensai Okamura
- Original video animation
- Directed by: Tensai Okamura
- Produced by: Hiroo Maruyama; Ryou Ooyama; Yoshihiro Ooyabu
- Written by: Shōtarō Suga
- Music by: Yasushi Ishii
- Studio: Bones
- Licensed by: AU: Madman Entertainment; NA: Funimation; UK: Manga Entertainment
- Released: January 27, 2010 – June 21, 2010
- Episodes: 4

Darker than Black: Gaiden (Japanese: Darker than Black ー黒の契約者ー 外伝, Hepburn: Dākā Zan Burakku ーKuro no Keiyakushaー Gaiden, lit. "Darker than Black The Black Contractor Sidestory") is a Japanese original video animation (OVA) series created by studio Bones and directed by Tensai Okamura. It is a sidesequel to the anime television series Darker than Black and a prequel to Darker than Black: Gemini of the Meteor. It consists of four episodes about the main character Hei and his partner Yin, with the events taking place between both seasons. After betraying the Syndicate organization, Hei and Yin escape from Japan to live a peaceful life, but Yin later develops a god-like alter ego that causes mayhem.

The individual episodes were released in Japan by Aniplex on certain DVD and Blu-ray home media releases of Gemini of the Meteor between January and July 2010. The OVA was licensed in English by Funimation in North America, Madman Entertainment in Australia and New Zealand, and by Manga Entertainment in the United Kingdom, and was included on the respective home media releases of Gemini of the Meteor in 2011.

Bones first announced the series in November 2009; it was created by Okamura, who wanted to tell Yin's backstory from Gemini of the Meteor to the audience. Darker than Black: Gaiden had a mostly positive critical reception for explaining the events that occur between both Darker than Black series and for dealing with the relationship between Hei and Yin; critics also praised the animation of the fight scenes.

== Plot ==
The assassin Hei fights Contractors, a group of fighters with supernatural powers who have been tasked with killing him after he betrayed the Syndicate during the series Darker than Black. In a hotel, Hei and his partner Yin, a human known as Doll who can assist through a Specter, pose as a recently married couple. Hei meets a woman who reminds him of Amber, a former ally from the Syndicate who turns out to be a Contractor who seeks the return of a Doll. Yin intervenes in their fight, nearly forcing the woman to kill herself. Hei defeats the others Contractors and finds Yin relieved. However, Hei notices Yin's alter ego on their way to Hong Kong; Yin's alter ego suggests she use herself as bait to attract and ambush the Syndicate. Hei faces the Contractors but one of them overwhelms her. Yin's spectre kills the Contractor and becomes infatuated with Hei. As the spectre disappears, an enemy named Xin-Qi escapes, revealing to his leader Madame Oreille Yin is a Doll known as Izanami, who she is researching.

Hei and Yin are rescued by Amagiri, a member of Evening Primrose, and organization of Contractors created by the late Amber. As they rest, Amagiri tells Hei Yin will develop the Izanami persona and cause genocide. Hei tells Yin they should split so he will not awaken Izanami but Yin rejects the idea because she wants to stay by his side. Soon afterwards, Xin-Qi takes on Amagiri's form to turn the Contractors against Hei. Hei defeats his enemies but is unable to stop Xin-Qi, who has disappeared with Yin. Hei and a group of Contractors go to find Yin. As Hei reaches Yin, Xin-Qi tricks him into attacking the doll, which awakens Izanami, who starts removing the souls of everybody around him, including Xin-Qi. Yin confesses her love for Hei and begs him to kill her rather than cause mayhem. Hei is opposed to this idea but the two are separated by an explosion. Meanwhile, an unknown group ensures Izanami's awakening is stopped and hide Yin inside a vehicle. Hei believes Yin died in the ensuing chaos and becomes an alcoholic. He is contacted by a Madame Oreille with confirmation from the CIA about Yin's survival and apparent location. Yin rests alongside a shadow and says she is sure Hei will return.

== Production ==
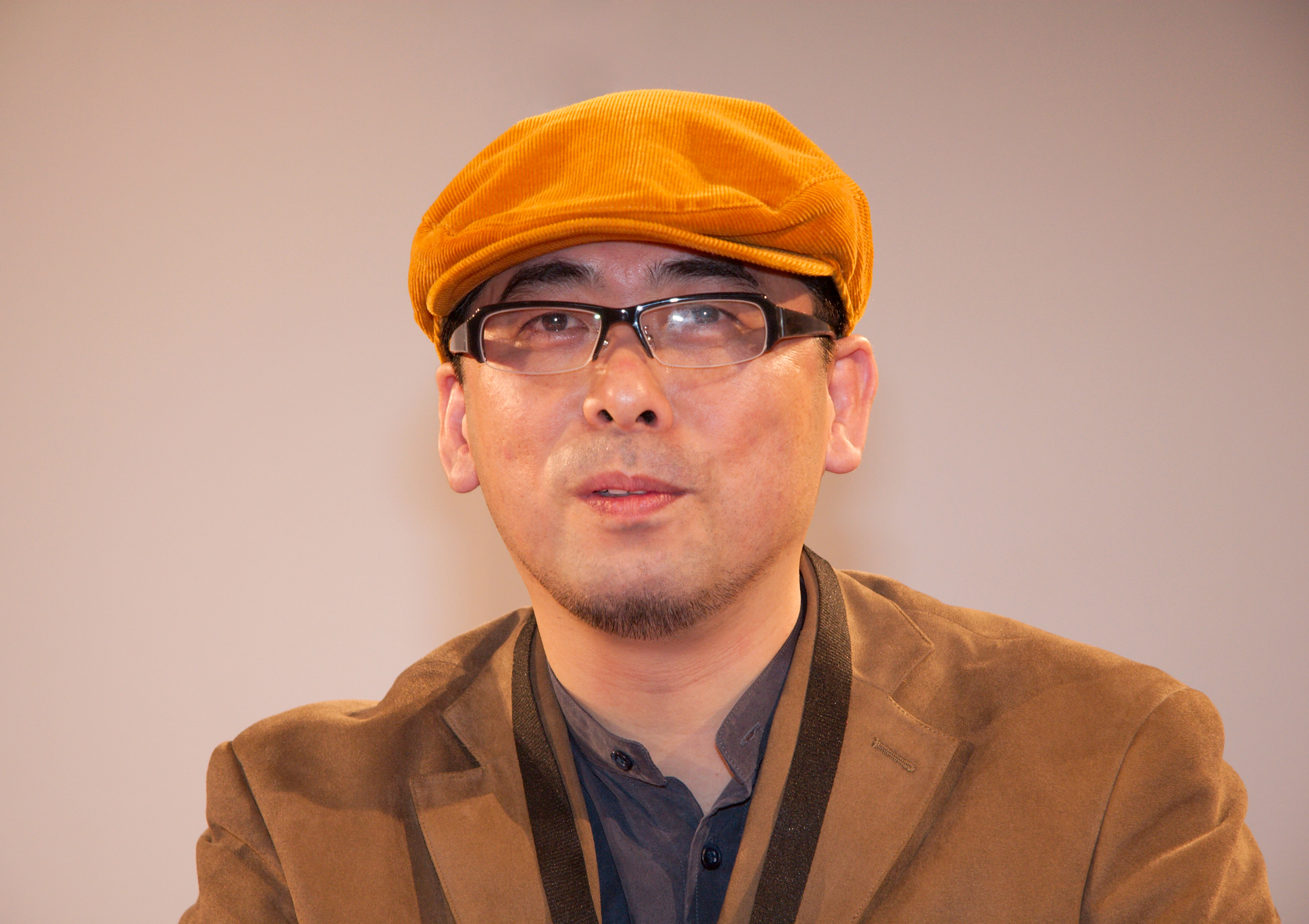
Tensai Okamura directed Darker than Black Gaiden.

Darker than Black: Gaiden was first envisioned when studio Bones decided to create the sequel to Darker than Black. In contrast with the new style and content of the sequel Darker than Black: Gemini of the Meteor that was aimed at new viewers, the four OVAs were made for returning fans who want a continuation of the first series. Bones Studio first announced in November 2009 that they would release OVAs alongside home-media releases of Gemini of the Meteor. Early advertisements said the OVAs were created to explain Hei's actions between the original Darker than Black series and Gemini of the Meteor.

Director Tensai Okamura created the OVAs to make Hei and Yin's stories easier to show because the second series primarily focuses on the new lead Suo Pavlichenko. According to Okamura, the series is meant to keep showing interesting fights involving Hei. The original character designer is Yuji Iwahara, while animation director Takahiro Komori returned too adapt Iwahara's works. Most of the production staff returned for the second television series. Okamura gave writer Shōtarō Suga complete freedom and asked only that a scene with rain be put in; this scene is in the third episode, in which Xin-Qi forces the Contractors to attack Hei.

Fuji from Aniplex wanted the show's fans to look forward to the first episode's fight scenes, primarily Hei's, as well as calm scenes that show Yin's beauty. Because the first episode involves the two posing as a recently married couple, production staff wanted fans to see this as the major highlight because these circumstance was unusual for both of them. When Izanami takes the form of Yin and becomes infatuated with Hei, the animators made the scene erotic. The developers said the fourth episode is interesting because it focuses on action scenes involving Hei. There is a glimpse of Hei's weakness and a tragic fate for Yin, giving the series a suitable ending. Iwahara was tasked with drawing both characters with sexual appeal; their Japanese voice actors celebrated the finale by writing letters about their characters. In regard to Hei's history with Yin, Suga said he did not like Hei's announcing in Gemini of the Meteor he was going to kill Yin because it felt too depressing and he wanted to balance that with a more optimistic tone in Gaiden.

Yasushi Ishii composed the music. In contrast with the music of Gemini of the Meteor, Gaiden's soundtrack uses piano and string instruments. The OVAs closing theme is "Darker than Black" by Ishii. The theme was noted for its similarities with David Bowie's song "Ziggy Stardust". Ishii said although he was heavily influenced by Bowie's works, the similarities are accidental. According to Isshi, the song primarily focuses on Hei, who fights as a savior and is further characterized as a man in a world of struggle, mercy, and overcoming oneself. Ishii wanted to write Hei as a man who, despite having these powers, is lonely.

== Release ==
Darker than Black: Gaiden was released in Japan on certain home media sets of Gemini of the Meteor; the first episode was released on January 27, 2010, included on the second volume; the second episode was released on March 24, 2010, included on the fourth volume; the third episode was released on May 26, 2010, included on the sixth volume; the fourth episode was released on July 21, 2010, on the eighth and final volume. The four episodes were also included on the Blu-ray box of Gemini of the Meteor, released on January 15, 2014.

For English-language markets, the OVAs were released in 2011 as part of the Gemini of the Meteor DVD and Blu-ray compilation; in North America it was released by Funimation on January 20; in the United Kingdom by Manga Entertainment on December 26; and in Australia and New Zealand by Madman Entertainment on December 14. Funimation re-released the series on a Blu-ray box of Gemini of the Meteor on May 12, 2015.

== Reception ==
Critics praised Darker than Black: Gaiden for making Hei's changed characterization in the show's second season easier to understand. It was, however, noted to lack the appeal of Suo Pavlichenko's tragic story in Gemini of the Meteor. A reviewer from Anime UK Network gave the second season of Darker than Black a more favorable score thanks to the content from the OVAs he enjoyed. Ent Online and Anime News Network commented on the narrative, the former noting it has a "deeper" narrative because of the focus on Hei and Yin, appealing mostly to returning fans. Anime News Network did not find its appeal of tragedy when compared with Suo's story from the second season as he felt Suo was written more tragically. The Fandom Post found the OVAs enjoyable for the way they explain multiple changes in the second season and emotional "punches" involving the changes that result in the changes of Hei's and Yin's characterization. Anime UK News praised the OVAs despite finding it awkward Bones created it after Gemini of the Meteor rather than before. Another Anime News Network article stated fans should watch Darker than Black: Gaiden before Gemini of the Meteor because it makes the latter's narrative easier to understand and explains Hei's dark portrayal and Yin's disappearance. The Fandom Post said Gaiden is more entertaining to watch after Gemini of the Meteor due to the surprises in the OVA series following the television series Gemini of the Meteor if watched after. About.com found Darker than Black: Gaiden more appealing than Gemini of the Meteor, wishing it had more episodes to explore Hei's life with Yin. In the book The Anime Encyclopedia, 3rd Revised Edition: A Century of Japanese Animation, Darker than Black: Gaiden is noted to have the same consistency as both television series, making the trilogy properly hold up.

The visuals and actions were praised by the media. My Reviewer called the action sequences "jaw-droppingly intense" enough to make the audience re-watch it. UK Anime Network praised Hei's and Yin's journey; the reviewer said the narrative develops Hei further than both television series while adding more world-building and well-done animation. Ent Online stated the OVA "look better with the colors, detail and is much sharper and even more details on the background". Anime News Network claimed that while the animation retained the same appeal as the Gemini of the Meteor, some designs ended looking cartoonish.

Maxibe Gee from the University of York regarded Gaiden as a tragic story that challenges such traditions presented in the noir genre; in the original Darker than Black Hei and Yin develop their humanity and in the finale, they are searching for a free life. The duo, however, fail to find a happy ending and instead find more conflict, resulting into a major change in Hei's character as noted in Gemini of the Meteor.
