= Alison Viktorin =

American voice actress

- Born: Alison Ruth Retzloff; February 1, 1981 (age 45); Houston, Texas, U.S.
- Education: California Lutheran University
- Occupation: Voice actress
- Years active: 2004–2021
- Agent: Mary Collins Agency
- Spouse: Dustin Viktorin (m. 2005)
- Children: 1

Alison Ruth Viktorin (née Retzloff; born February 1, 1981) is an American retired voice actress, her most notable role being Conan Edogawa in the detective series Case Closed. She also voiced Kuroko Shirai in A Certain Magical Index and its spinoff, A Certain Scientific Railgun, Chiharu Ando in Chio's School Road, Suo Pavlichenko in Darker than Black, Amy in Burst Angel, Acra in The Tower of Druaga: The Sword of Uruk, Naru Kotoishi in Barakamon, Hotaru Amakawa in Rumbling Hearts, Kobato Hasegawa in Haganai and QT in Space Dandy.

== Early life ==
Alison Ruth Retzloff was born on February 1, 1981, to Sally (née Simonsen) and Albert Retzloff. In 2003, she graduated from California Lutheran University earning a BA in drama. Retzloff married Dustin Kayne Viktorin of Euless, Texas, on August 27, 2005, in Fredericksburg, Texas.

== Career ==
Viktorin has provided voices for English-language versions of many anime dubs, such as the title character Sasami Iwakura in Sasami: Magical Girls Club, Chiharu Ando in Chio's School Road, Suo Pavlichenko in Darker than Black, Naru Kotoishi in Barakamon, Kobato Hasegawa in Haganai series, Kyo Soma in Fruits Basket, Kai in Chaos Dragon, Hotaru Amakawa in Rumbling Hearts, Kuroko Shirai in A Certain Magical Index and A Certain Scientific Railgun series, Amy in Burst Angel, Shelia in Fairy Tail, Shingo Jinnouchi and Ame in the Mamoru Hosoda anime films Summer Wars and Wolf Children, and Gasper Vladi in the High School DxD series.

She has also done commercials and modeling in the Dallas/Fort Worth area.

In video games, she voiced Jing Wei, a playable God in Smite.

In 2021, Viktorin announced that she would be retiring from anime voice acting in light of political disagreements on social media during the January 6 United States Capitol attack, as well as the difficulty of recording from home during the COVID-19 pandemic.

== Filmography ==
=== Anime ===
List of voice performances in anime
Year	Series	Role	Notes	Source
2004	Kiddy Grade	Viola	Debut role, As Alison Retzloff	CA
2004–09	Case Closed	Conan Edogawa	First starring voice-over role, also related English-dubbed films and specials, video games. Credited as Alison Retzloff, later Viktorin.	
2004	Spiral	Little Boy	As Alison Retzloff	CA
2004	Dragon Ball GT: A Hero's Legacy	Bucky	As Alison Retzloff	CA
2005	Burst Angel	Amy	As Alison Retzloff	
2006	Black Cat	Adam	As Alison Retzloff	Resume
2006	Desert Punk	Tsumiko		CA
2006	Lupin the Third: Missed by a Dollar	Spirit Guide	As Alison Retzloff	CA
2006–08	Negima! series	Fuka Narutaki, Fumika Narutaki	Also specials	CA
2006	Rumbling Hearts	Hotaru Amakawa		CA
2007	Mushishi	Maho, Isana	Eps. 3, 22	CA
2007	School Rumble	Haruki Hanai (Child)	Ep. 13	CA
2008	Hell Girl	Nina	Ep. 17	
2008	Witchblade	Yuki Sasaki	Ep. 16	
2008	Ghost Hunt	Kenji Nagano	Eps. 12–13	
2008–09	Sasami: Magical Girls Club	Sasami Iwakura	2 seasons	
2009	Blassreiter	Sepp	Ep. 14	Resume
2009	El Cazador de la Bruja	Joaquin	Ep. 26	
2010	Ouran High School Host Club	Little Boy		CA
2010	Sands of Destruction	Reve Urshela (Young)	Ep. 12	CA
2010	The Tower of Druaga: The Sword of Uruk	Acra		Resume
2011	Sgt. Frog	Karara	Eps. 64–65, 77	Resume
2011–13	Heaven's Lost Property series	Tomoko	2 seasons	
2011	Summer Wars	Shingo Jinnouchi		
2011	Darker than Black: Gemini of the Meteor	Suo Pavlichenko		Resume
2012	Shakugan no Shana Movie	Yukari Hirai		
2012–20	A Certain Magical Index series	Kuroko Shirai		
2013	Wolf Children	Ame (Child)		
2013–20	A Certain Scientific Railgun series	Kuroko Shirai		Resume
2013–14	Haganai series	Kobato Hasegawa		
2014–18	High School DxD series	Gasper Vladi	New, BorN, and Hero	
2014	Karneval	Kiichi		
2014	Space Dandy	QT		
2015	Gangsta.	Heather	Eps. 11–12	
2015	Nobunagun	Lemon/Geronimo		
2015–19	Fairy Tail	Shelia Blendi		
2016	Dimension W	Deborah Eastriver	Eps. 7–12	
2016	Three Leaves, Three Colors	Yū Takezono		Tweet
2016	Barakamon	Naru Kotoishi		
2016	Puzzle & Dragons X	Lance (Young)		
2016	Strike Witches: The Movie	Rosalie de Hemricourt de Grunne		
2016	The Disastrous Life of Saiki K.	Kūsuke Saiki (Young)	Ep. 21	
2016	Chaos Dragon	Kai		
2016	Show by Rock!!#	Balt	Ep. 5	
2016	Trickster	Kensuke Hanasaki (Young)		
2016	Tōken Ranbu: Hanamaru	Nakigitsune		
2016	Keijo!!!!!!!!	Tae Yokosugi		
2017	Aquarion Logos	Tinoa	Eps. 18, 23, 25	
2017	Akiba's Trip: The Animation	Suidōbashi		
2017	Chain Chronicle: The Light of Haecceitas	Furball		
2017	Miss Kobayashi's Dragon Maid	Shōta Magatsuchi	Season 1 only	
2017	The Royal Tutor	Leonhard von Glanzreich (Young)	Ep. 3	
2017	Alice & Zōroku	Daiki Miho	Ep. 8	
2017	KanColle: Kantai Collection	Yayoi		
2017	Hyōka	Rie Zenna		
2017	My First Girlfriend Is a Gal	Yui Kashī		
2017	Convenience Store Boy Friends	Akira Mishima		
2017	Tsuredure Children	Kana Ījima		
2017	New Game!	Ren Ījima		
2017	In Another World with My Smartphone	Renee	Ep. 8	
2017	Anime-Gataris	Arisu Kamiigusa		
2018	Yamada-kun and the Seven Witches	Aya	Eps. 2, 4	
2018	The Ancient Magus' Bride	Ethan Barklem	Eps. 16-17	
2018	Hakyū Hōshin Engi	Ko Tensho		
2018	Planetarian: Hoshi no Hito	Ruth		
2018	Concrete Revolutio series	Furota		
2018	Chio's School Road	Chiharu Ando		
2019	Endro!	Mao		
2019	Boogiepop and Others	Makoto	4 episodes	
2019–20	Fruits Basket	Kyo Soma (young)	2019 reboot	
2019	Sarazanmai	Haruka Yasaka		
2019	RobiHachi	Gras	Final voice acting role	

=== Animation ===
List of voice performances in animation
Year	Title	Role	Notes	Source
2002-03	Mission Odyssey	Telemachus		

=== Video games ===
List of voice performances in video games
Year	Title	Role	Notes	Source
2009	Case Closed: The Mirapolis Investigation	Conan Edogawa		
2014	Smite	Jing Wei		

=== Live-action dubbing ===
List of voice performances in live action
Year	Title	Role	Notes	Source
2016	Rurouni Kenshin series	Myōjin Yahiko		
