= Tensai Okamura =

Japanese anime director

Tensai Okamura (岡村天斎)
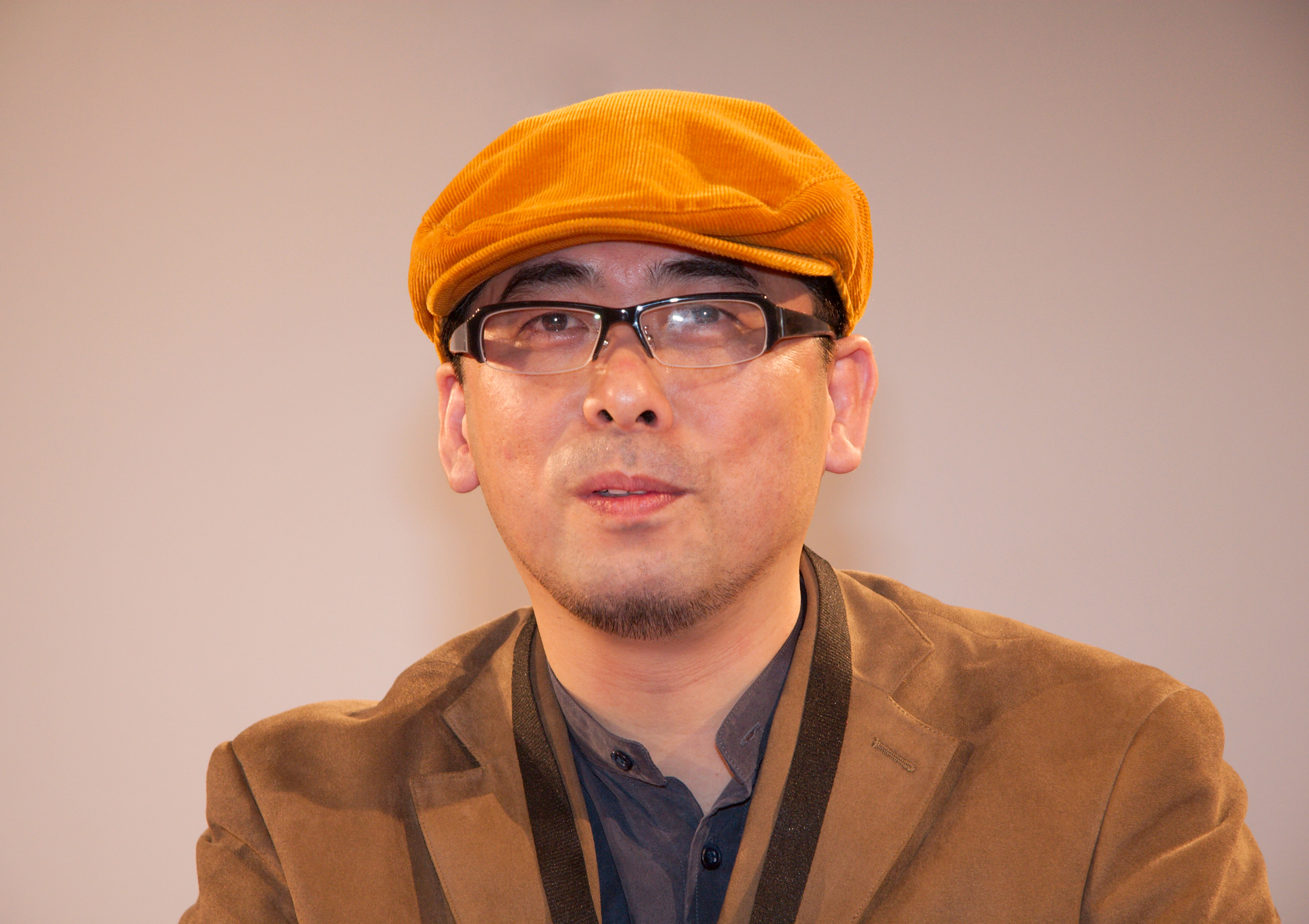
- Tensai Okamura, 2007 Chibi Japan Expo
- Born: Okamura Yutaka 岡村豊; December 13, 1961 (age 64); Fukushima Prefecture, Japan
- Education: Waseda University's department of science and engineering
- Occupations: Anime director and animator
- Years active: 1984–present
- Employer(s): Madhouse (formerly); Currently freelance
- Known for: Wolf's Rain; Darker than Black; Blue Exorcist

Tensai Okamura (岡村 天斎, Okamura Tensai), born Yutaka Okamura (岡村 豊, Okamura Yutaka) on December 13, 1961, in Fukushima Prefecture, is a Japanese anime director and animator. Okamura grew up in Yokohama, Kanagawa Prefecture. He is a graduate of Waseda University's department of science and engineering. In 1991, he changed his first name to Tensai.

== Biography ==
As a child he read manga about ninjas, spies and superheroes, and was particularly influenced by a Shirato Sampei manga about ninjas which helped young readers learn the art of ninja; "the spirit and the atmosphere of the spy series that rocked my childhood", such as The Fugitive, were other influences on Okamura's series. During his university days at Waseda University, Okamura was a part of Waseda's manga research society and together with other budding animators, produced his first independent anime there. Upon graduating from university, Okamura joined the animation production studio Madhouse as an animator with the recommendation of a friend. Lensman: Secret of The Lens was the first he worked on as an animator. In 1989, he made his debut as an episode director with Yawara! and soon made his full directorial debut in 1995 with Memories. He later left Madhouse and went freelance, working on several projects along the way.

== Influences ==
The idea for Darker Than Black came to Okamura while he was creating the anime Wolf's Rain, and was based on his handling of protagonists. The main characters in Wolf's Rain are heroic, unlike the violent protagonists in Darker than Black; Okamura wanted the latter's characters to be flawed, in contrast to those in Wolf's Rain. The bi episodic structure is based on the experience Okamura worked as storyboarder in the anime Cowboy Bebop. They have space to dig more on the new character of each new arc. The series composition of first half is Okamura himself, leaving a lot freedom to the writers. The second half, since this original show needs to be put into an end, it is Shotaro Suga handling the role as his first time to be series composition.

In Gemini of the Meteor, Okamura considered diverging from the previous season. Okamura, who found the first series' narrative confusing and Hei rough, wanted to change the series' tone; Suo was created to contrast with Hei. Okamura hoped that the changes would appeal to new viewers, who would then watch the first season. Darker than Black: Gaiden first envisioned when Bones decided to create the series' sequel. In contrast to the new style and content from the sequel aimed towards new viewers, the 4 OVAs were made for the returning fans who want see what happened after the first series.

== Works ==
=== Anime television series ===
- Galactic Patrol Lensman (1984, in-between animation)
- Yawara! A Fashionable Judo Girl! (1989, episode overview and storyboards)
- Blue Seed (1994, key animation)
- Neon Genesis Evangelion (1995, episode direction, storyboards and key animation)
- Cowboy Bebop (1998, storyboards)
- Medabots (1999, director, episode direction and storyboards)
- Kikaider: The Animation (2000, director, episode direction, storyboards)
- Full Metal Panic! (2002, storyboards and episode direction)
- RahXephon (2002, storyboards)
- Wolf's Rain (2003, director, storyboards, episode direction)
- Samurai Champloo (2004, storyboards)
- Ghost in the Shell: S.A.C. 2nd Gig (2004, storyboards)
- Victorian Romance Emma (2005, storyboards)
- Ouran High School Host Club (2006, storyboards)
- Project Blue Earth SOS (2006, director)
- Darker than Black: Kuro no Keiyakusha (2007, director, original concept, series composition)
- Soul Eater (2008, storyboards, episode direction, second opening theme storyboards and direction)
- Nijū Mensō no Musume (2008, storyboards)
- Real Drive (2008, storyboards)
- Kannagi (2008, storyboards)
- Canaan (2009, storyboards)
- Darker Than Black: Ryūsei no Gemini (2009, director)
- Blue Exorcist (2011, director)
- Hanasaku Iroha (2011, storyboards)
- Guilty Crown (2012, storyboards)
- Tari Tari (2012, storyboards)
- Sword Art Online (2012, storyboards)
- Vividred Operation (2013, script)
- Nagi no Asukara (2013, storyboard)
- World Conquest Zvezda Plot (2014, director, series composition)
- The Seven Deadly Sins (2014, director)
- Kuromukuro (2016, director)
- Blade Runner: Black Lotus (2021–22, storyboards)
- My Hero Academia (2024, storyboard)

=== Anime movies ===
- Lensman: Secret of The Lens (1984, in-between animation)
- The Dagger of Kamui (1985, in-between animation)
- Neo Tokyo (1986, in-between animation)
- Toki no Tabibito -Time Stranger- (1986, in-between animation)
- Wicked City (1987, key animation)
- Legend of the Galactic Heroes: My Conquest is the Sea of Stars (1988, key animation)
- My Neighbor Totoro (1988, key animation)
- City Hunter: Bay City Wars (1990, key animation)
- Urusei Yatsura: Always, My Darling (1991, key animation)
- Hashire Melos! (1992, key animation)
- Ninja Scroll (1993, key animation)
- Ghost in the Shell / Kōkaku Kidōtai (1995, key animation)
- Memories Episode 2: Stink Bomb (1995, director)
- Neon Genesis Evangelion Gekijōban: The End of Evangelion (1997, #25 key animation)
- Spriggan (1998, gun art)
- Jin-Roh (2000, key animation)
- Cowboy Bebop: Knockin' on Heaven's Door (2001, western scene storyboards, key animation, animation direction coordinator)
- Naruto: Snow Princess' Book of Ninja Arts (2004, director)
- Naruto: Legend of the Stone of Gelel (2005, key animation)
- Tekken: Blood Vengeance (2011, storyboards)
- My Hero Academia: You're Next (2024, director)

=== OVA ===
- Junk Boy (1987, key animation)
- The Phoenix -Space- (1987, key animation)
- Demon City Shinjuku (1988, key animation)
- Goku: Midnight Eye (1989, animation direction, key animation)
- Cyber City Oedo 808 (1990, key animation)
- Mobile Suit Gundam 0083: Stardust Memory (1991, key animation)
- Darker than Black: Gaiden (2010, director, writer)
- My Hero Academia: A Piece of Cake (2025, director, storyboards)

=== Video games ===
- Tales of Destiny (1997, opening animation direction)
- Tales of Phantasia (1998, opening animation direction)
- Wild Arms 2: 2nd Ignition (1999, opening animation direction)

=== Manga ===
- Darker than Black (2007, writer)
