= Hidenobu Kiuchi =

Japanese voice actor

- 木内 秀信
- Born: February 5, 1969 (age 57); Kobe, Hyōgo Prefecture, Japan
- Occupation: Voice actor
- Years active: 1996–present
- Agent: Office Osawa
- Height: 177 cm (5 ft 10 in)

Hidenobu Kiuchi (木内 秀信, Kiuchi Hidenobu; born February 5, 1969) is a Japanese voice actor. Some of his major roles include Hol Horse in JoJo's Bizarre Adventure: Stardust Crusaders, Yūshi Oshitari in The Prince of Tennis, Kenzo Tenma in Monster, Ren Honjo in Nana, Hei in Darker than Black, Shisui Uchiha in Naruto Shippuden and Dad (Mr Yamada) in Chi's Sweet Home. He began as a stage actor when one of his seniors got him to do voice acting. He had leading roles in each series, such as Jose in Gunslinger Girl and Ramsbeckite Hematite in Cluster Edge. In 2008, he was the first Japanese voice actor to guest at an anime convention in Australia.

== Filmography ==
=== Anime ===
Year	Title	Role	Notes	Source
1996–2004	KochiKame: Tokyo Beat Cops			
1998	Rurouni Kenshin	Shiro		
2000	Hunter × Hunter	Basho	1999 anime series	
2001	The Prince of Tennis	Yūshi Oshitari	Also OVAs	
2003	R.O.D the TV	David		
2003	Gunslinger Girl	Jose		
2004	Monster	Dr. Kenzou Tenma		
2005	Peach Girl	Kazuya "Tōji" Tōjigamori		
2005	Onegai My Melody	King		
2005–2006	Sugar Sugar Rune	Magic World Mail Order Joe		
2005	Capeta	Miura		
2005	Cluster Edge	Hematite Ramsbeckite		
2005	Rockman EXE Beast	Zoano GateMan		
2006	Ergo Proxy	Checkpoint Security		
2006	One Piece	Nero		
2006	Nana	Ren Honjō		
2006–07	The Story of Saiunkoku	Ran Ryuuren	Also second series	
2006	Kemonozume	Toshihiko Momota		
2006	Death Note	Hirokazu Ukita		
2006	Katekyo Hitman Reborn!	Ryōhei Sasagawa		
2007–09	Darker than Black	Hei	Also Gemini and OVAs	
2007	MapleStory	Barrow		
2008–09	Chi's Sweet Home	Dad (Mr Yamada)	Also New Address	
2008	Yakushiji Ryōko no Kaiki Jikenbo	Junichirō Izumida		
2008	Mōryō no Hako	Tatsumi Sekiguchi		
2009	Rideback	Ryunosuke Kataoka		
2009	Jewelpet	King		
2009-10	Fullmetal Alchemist: Brotherhood	King Bradley (young)		
2011	Gosick	Grevil de Blois		
2011	Naruto Shippuden	Shisui Uchiha		
2012	Natsume's Book of Friends	Mikage	4th season	
2012	Eureka Seven: AO	Georg		
2012	Chōyaku Hyakunin isshu: Uta Koi	Michimiyabi Fujiwara		
2012	Initial D: Fifth Stage	Go Hojo		
2012	Hunter × Hunter	Franklin	2011 anime series	
2013	Little Battlers eXperience Wars	Daimon Joseph		
2013	Hajime no Ippo Rising	David Eagle		
2014	Future Card Buddyfight	Castle manager		
2014	The Irregular at Magic High School	Chiba Toshikazu		
2014	Aikatsu!	Swordmaster	Ep. 85	
2014–15	JoJo's Bizarre Adventure: Stardust Crusaders	Hol Horse		
2014	Terra Formars	Shokichi Komachi		
2017	Otoppe!	Flamey, Woodwood, Glasston		
2018	Violet Evergarden	Dietfried Bougainvillea		
2020	Boruto: Naruto Next Generations	Kirisaki		
2021	Tesla Note	Kensuke Toriumi		
2023	Pluto	Brando	ONA	
2024	The Witch and the Beast	Reuben Cole		
2025	Headhunted to Another World	Butagarian		
2025	Me and the Alien MuMu	Wataru Tenkubashi		
2025	From Old Country Bumpkin to Master Swordsman	Gatoga Lazorne		
2025	Let's Go Karaoke!	Big Brother Yamaha		
2026	Daemons of the Shadow Realm	Yama		
2026	The Ghost in the Shell	Kusanagi's boyfriend		

=== Tokusatsu ===
Year	Title	Role	Notes	Source
2016	Doubutsu Sentai Zyuohger	Saguil Brothers A (B Voiced by Hiro Yuki)	Ep. 37 - 38	

=== Anime films ===
Year	Title	Role	Notes	Source
2004	Dead Leaves	Guard A		
2011	Fullmetal Alchemist: The Sacred Star of Milos	Ashleigh Crichton		
2012	Blue Exorcist: The Movie	Cheng-Long Liu		
2013	Hunter × Hunter: Phantom Rouge	Franklin		
2023	Birth of Kitarō: The Mystery of GeGeGe	Mizuki		

=== Video games ===
Year	Title	Role	Source
2002	GioGio's Bizarre Adventure	Squalo, Melone, Scolippi, Sale, Baby Face	
2010	Resonance of Fate	Juris	
2011	Tales of Xillia	Wingul	
2012	Under Night In-Birth	Merkava	
2015	JoJo's Bizarre Adventure: Eyes of Heaven	Hol Horse	
2016	Ys VIII: Lacrimosa of Dana	Sahad	
2017	Resident Evil 7: Biohazard	Ethan Winters	
2018	Granblue Fantasy	Yurius	
2019	Dragalia Lost	Yurius	
2020	JoJo's Bizarre Adventure: Last Survivor	Hol Horse	
2021	Resident Evil Village	Ethan Winters	
2022	JoJo's Bizarre Adventure: All Star Battle R	Hol Horse	

=== Overseas dubbing ===
Series	Role	Voice dub for	Notes	Source
Ant-Man	Scott Lang / Ant-Man	Paul Rudd		
Captain America: Civil War	Scott Lang / Ant-Man	Paul Rudd		
The Fundamentals of Caring	Ben Benjamin	Paul Rudd		
Ant-Man and the Wasp	Scott Lang / Ant-Man	Paul Rudd		
Avengers: Endgame	Scott Lang / Ant-Man	Paul Rudd		
Between Two Ferns: The Movie	Paul Rudd	Paul Rudd		
Living with Yourself	Miles Elliot	Paul Rudd		
What If...?	Scott Lang / Ant-Man	Paul Rudd	Animation	
The Shrink Next Door	Dr. Isaac "Ike" Herschkopf	Paul Rudd		
Ghostbusters: Afterlife	Gary Grooberson	Paul Rudd		
Ant-Man and the Wasp: Quantumania	Scott Lang / Ant-Man	Paul Rudd		
Teenage Mutant Ninja Turtles: Mutant Mayhem	Mondo Gecko	Paul Rudd	Animation	
Ghostbusters: Frozen Empire	Gary Grooberson	Paul Rudd		
Anaconda	Ronald "Griff" Griffen Jr.	Paul Rudd		
Avengers: Doomsday	Scott Lang / Ant-Man	Paul Rudd		
The 100	Paxton McCreary	William Miller		
24	Mike Doyle	Ricky Schroder	Season 6	
Body of Proof	Peter Dunlop	Nicholas Bishop		
Brothers and Sisters	Johnson			
The Chronicles of Narnia: The Lion, the Witch and the Wardrobe	Peter Pevensie (adult)	Noah Huntley		
Corpse Bride	Victor Van Dort	Johnny Depp	Animation	
The Curse of La Llorona	Detective Cooper	Sean Patrick Thomas		
Frank	Frank	Michael Fassbender		
Hard Hit	Lee Seong-gyu	Jo Woo-jin		
Hitman: Agent 47	John Smith	Zachary Quinto		
Missing	Kevin	Ken Leung		
Obi-Wan Kenobi	The Fifth Brother	Sung Kang		
Pan Am	Nico	Goran Višnjić		
Pretty Little Liars: Original Sin	Sheriff Tom Beasley	Eric Johnson		
Pepper Dennis	Mark	Eddie Matos		
Snowden	Glenn Greenwald	Zachary Quinto		
The Standoff at Sparrow Creek	Gannon	James Badge Dale		
Viy 2: Journey to China	Jonathan Green	Jason Flemyng		
Who Am I	Max	Elyas M'Barek		
