= Darker than Black =

Japanese anime television series

- Darker Than Black ー黒の契約者ー; Dākā Zan Burakku ーKuro no Keiyakushaー
- Type: TV series
- Genre: Mystery; Science fiction; Supernatural thriller
- Created by: Bones; Tensai Okamura
- Directed by: Tensai Okamura
- Series composition: Tensai Okamura (1–12); Shōtarō Suga (13–25)
- Character designer: Takahiro Komori
- Music by: Yoko Kanno
- Voices of: Hidenobu Kiuchi; Misato Fukuen; Nana Mizuki; Masaru Ikeda; Ikuya Sawaki; Tomoko Kawakami
- Opening themes: "Howling" by Abingdon Boys School; "Kakusei Heroism (The Hero Without a "Name")" by An Cafe
- Ending themes: "Tsukiakari" by Rie fu; "Dreams" by High and Mighty Color
- No. of episodes: 25 (list of episodes)

Production
- Art director: Takashi Aoi
- Sound director: Kazuhiro Wakabayashi
- Cinematographer: Yoshiyuki Takei
- Color designer: Nobuko Mizuta
- CG director: Mayuko Furumoto
- Editor: Sataoko Ogino
- Studio: Bones
- Producers: Yoshihiro Ooyabu; Ryo Oyama; Hiroo Maruyama; Osamu Hosokawa
- Production companies: DTB Production Committee (Note: Label consisting of various companies); MBS
- Runtime: 24 minutes

Original release
- Networks: JNN (MBS, TBS)
- Release: April 6 – September 29, 2007

Related
- Manga
- Written by: Tensai Okamura
- Illustrated by: Nokiya
- Published by: Kadokawa Shoten
- English publisher: NA: Yen Press
- Magazine: Monthly Asuka
- Original run: March 24, 2007 – November 24, 2007
- Volumes: 2
- Original video animation

Beneath the Fully Bloomed Cherry Blossoms
- Directed by: Tensai Okamura
- Written by: Shinsuke Onishi
- Music by: Yoko Kanno
- Studio: Bones
- Licensed by: AUS: Madman Entertainment; NA: Funimation; UK: Manga Entertainment
- Released: March 26, 2008
- Runtime: 25 minutes
- Manga
- Darker than Black: Shikkoku no Hana (2009–2011)
- Sequel
- Darker than Black: Gemini of the Meteor (2009)
- Spin-off
- Darker than Black: Gaiden (2010)

Darker than Black (Japanese: Darker Than Black ー黒の契約者ー, Hepburn: Dākā Zan Burakku ーKuro no Keiyakushaー; 'Darker than Black: The Black Contractor') is a Japanese anime television series created and directed by Tensai Okamura and animated by studio Bones. It was broadcast for 25 episodes on MBS, TBS, and their affiliated stations from April to September 2007. The series is set in a world where two spatial anomalies, "Heaven's Gate" in South America and "Hell's Gate" in Tokyo, appeared and altered the sky, wreaking havoc on the landscapes. Shortly afterwards, people with special abilities, labeled as Contractors, emerged. The story follows Hei, an agent in the Syndicate organization, and his comrades as they operate in a vastly altered version of contemporary Tokyo to uncover the mysteries of Hell's Gate.

A manga adaptation was serialized in Kadokawa Shoten's Monthly Asuka from March to November 2007. A second manga adaptation, Darker than Black: Shikkoku no Hana, was serialized in Square Enix's Young Gangan from May 2009 to January 2011. A sequel to the anime series, Darker than Black: Gemini of the Meteor, was broadcast from October to December 2009. In the sequel, Hei trains the new Contractor Suo Pavlichenko and searches for his former ally Yin. DVDs of the series include a four-episode original video animation titled Darker than Black: Gaiden, which explores the relationship between Hei and Yin during the time between the original series and the sequel. The series was formerly licensed for an English-language release in North America by Funimation.

Okamura created the series, drawing inspiration from ninja and spy stories and ideas he had after creating Wolf's Rain. Unlike the heroic cast of Wolf's Rain, Okamura wanted flawed and violent heroes, such as the Contractors. Okamura wrote most of the series himself, but he gave other writers, most notably Shōtarō Suga, the freedom to contribute. Suga took over as the main writer in the second half.

The critical response to Darker than Black has been generally positive, praising the portrayal of Hei and the other Contractors. However, some have criticized the setting and ending.

== Plot ==
The series is primarily set in modern Tokyo, including Shinjuku (pictured)

Ten years ago before the events of the series, a spatial anomaly which became known as "Heaven's Gate" appeared in South America. It was followed by the opening of "Hell's Gate" in Tokyo, altering the sky and wreaking havoc on the landscape. At that time, "Contractors", people with special abilities, capable of supernatural feats, emerged. Kept secret from the public, Contractors murder in cold blood and block their emotions with logic and reason. Their abilities are acquired at the cost of their humanity, and their name derives from the requirement to "pay the price" each time their powers are used. Nations and organizations around the world train and use Contractors as spies and assassins, resulting in violent battles for valuable objects and information.

After the 'Heaven's War', the United States loses its position as a superpower to a mysterious organization known as the Syndicate. Darker Than Black follows a Chinese Contractor code-named "Hei" as he undertakes espionage and assassination missions in Tokyo directed by the Syndicate. In his false civilian life, where he is known as a shy student under the alias Li Shenshun, Hei is assisted by Yin, an artificial human known as Doll and Mao, a Contractor trapped in a cat's body and overseen by former police officer Huang. The series has a villain-of-the-week format, with a variety of characters such as a Japanese Public Security Bureau who oversee the activities of dangerous people with supernatural powers.

Early in the series Hei is revealed as a former fighter in the Heaven's War, searching for his missing sister Bai; he believes that a woman known as Amber is responsible for Bai's disappearance after escaping from the Syndicate. Amber leads Evening Primrose, a group of Contractors targeted by the Syndicate who claim they are terrorists. Pandora, another group, investigates Hell's Gate; the Syndicate is using Pandora and its Saturn Ring weapon to attack Hell's Gate and annihilate the Contractors. This creates mayhem as multiple Syndicate agents target Huang who ultimately commits suicide. Hei and Yin meet Amber while Mao escapes from them. Upon meeting Amber, Hei is revealed to be an ordinary human who became able to use Bai's power after his sister placed his body onto his flesh through her powers. When Saturn Ring is activated, all Contractors except Hei are killed. Hei has a vision where he meets Bai and decides to betray the Syndicate. Amber uses her Contract powers to revert time long enough to enable Hei to destroy Saturn Ring, and Hei and Yin escape from the Syndicate.

== Cast ==
Character	Japanese voice	English voice
Hei	Hidenobu Kiuchi	Jason Liebrecht
Yin	Misato Fukuen	Brina Palencia
Misaki Kirihara	Nana Mizuki	Kate Oxley
Huang	Masaru Ikeda	John Swasey
Mao	Ikuya Sawaki	Kent Williams
Amber	Tomoko Kawakami	Laura Bailey

== Production ==
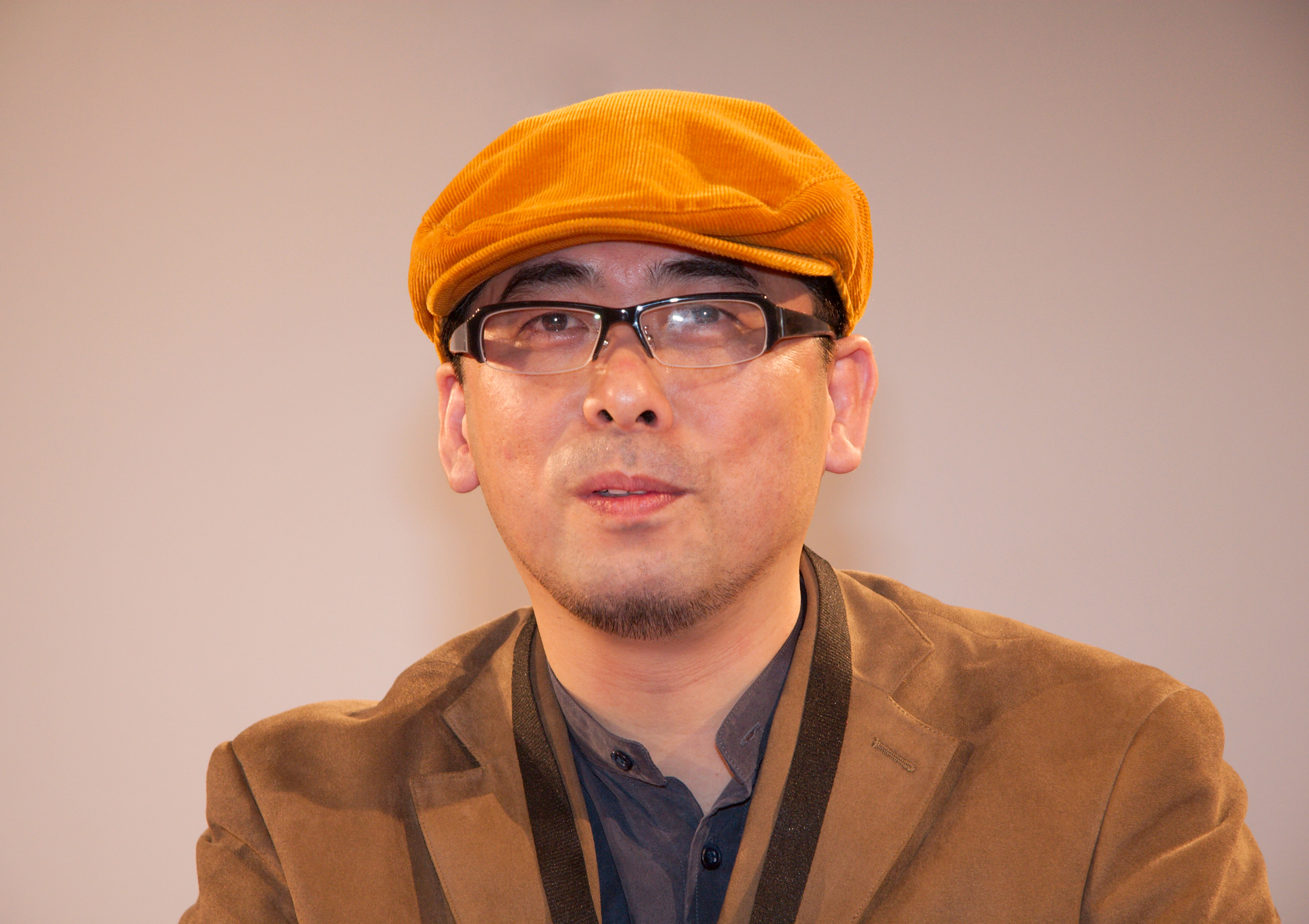
Darker than Black was the first work that director Tensai Okamura conceived alone

Darker than Black was first announced in December 2006, and its first trailer was released in March 2007. The series was created and directed by Tensai Okamura. Because Darker than Black had an original screenplay, Okamura often considered changing the plot—something impossible with manga adaptations, which require consistency with the source material. Okamura originally wanted the series to be titled BK201, after a code name, but the anime staff considered the title weak, and an employee of Mainichi Broadcasting System suggested Darker Than Black.

The idea for Darker Than Black came to Okamura while he was creating the anime Wolf's Rain, and was based on his handling of protagonists. The main characters in Wolf's Rain are heroic, unlike the violent protagonists in Darker than Black; Okamura wanted the latter's characters to be flawed, in contrast to those in Wolf's Rain. Darker than Black was the first anime series created by Okamura, who said that it took him several years. As a child he read manga about ninjas, spies and superheroes, and was particularly influenced by a Shirato Sampei manga about ninjas which helped young readers learn the art of ninja; the spirit and atmosphere of the spy series that had impressed him in his childhood, such as The Fugitive, were other influences on Okamura's series. In particular, Okamura wanted a series about ninja to be centered around modern Tokyo. The handling of the two Gates prominent in the series's world building was inspired by Roadside Picnic, a novel by Arkady and Boris Strugatsky.

=== Writing ===
The bi-episodic structure was based on Okamura's experience as a storyboarder on the anime Cowboy Bebop. It gave the staff space to explore the new characters of each arc more thoroughly. Okamura himself was the series compositor for the first half, leaving the writers a great deal of freedom. For the second half, since the original show needed to be brought to an end, Shōtarō Suga took on the role of series compositor for the first time. The writing team consisted of Shinsuke Onishi, Yuichi Nomura, Suga, Kurasumi Sunayama, and Okamura himself. Okamura wrote the first two episodes as the first arc, in advance, to start off the series. Onishi was an acquaintance of Okamura from previous works, and the latter described him as offering interesting scripts without speaking a word. Onishi was the most spiritual writer of Darker than Black; every episode with detective comedy was handled by him, which was Okamura's original wish to make a 1980s-like Japanese detective story. His stories usually contained a clear theme structured by a thematic line and a complementary line.

Nomura was the writer who conceived the character of Amber and was credited as being especially good at depicting the beauty of humanity alongside cruelty. Nomura wrote multiple episodes focused on relationships as well as the final parts involving Amber, giving her a tragic ending despite the character staying on Hei's side until her death. Sunayama handled all the gang-related stories, including the Hong Kong mafia and Japanese yakuza. In his stories, the desires of the characters were extracted and deferred. In his writing, Nomura found Hei funny from time to time, as he tried to pretend to be innocent and naive as a Chinese international student while his strength as a spy overflowed. Suga, the most important writer in the Darker than Black series, handled high-concept and main-plot-related arcs, with Hei in the spotlight.

The Havoc arc first revealed to the audience the possibility that Hei was not a Contractor. The inside-the-Gate episodes were the first time real change took place for Hei's character arc after meeting a man who shared the same dreams as him. Suga was the one closest to Okamura's worldview; since they kept up a throw-and-catch, he asked Okamura about the settings and helped him extract what and how he wanted to express. With Suga's control of the last few arcs—taking the doll selling as an example—the stories began to converge, and the ending was designed by Suga.

=== Animation ===
Most of the major characters from Darker than Black, designed by Takahiro Komori

Character designer Yūji Iwahara inspired Okamura to work on Darker than Black, based on his work on the video game Koudelka and its manga version. The narrative was inspired by Japanese dramas which divide stories into two consecutive episodes. As a result, every story of Darker than Black took two episodes to finish. Okamura wanted to give his audience comic and dark stories for variety. Actual locations, including Shinjuku and a police station, were photographed to make the series more realistic. According to Iwahara, Hei was the most difficult character to draw; he struggled for a subtle balance when designing the character. Hei's black eyes were smaller, creating a cold impression, and later became more expressive. Li, his civilian persona, was originally gentle-looking. Iwahara accepted the offer because he was interested in the project and wanted to do something different after his previous serialized manga. Although he found the character sheets easy to do, he was daunted by the number of characters he had to create.

The team was tasked with depicting super-powered individuals fighting against a Tokyo backdrop, which was complicated. Okamura found early designs unacceptable; until his image of the characters matched Iwahara's, the pictures were redrawn many times. Iwahara found his work on the anime more challenging than his manga, since he had to keep up with staff requests and had little artistic freedom. Takahiro Komori adapted Iwahara's work for animation, retaining the essence of the original designs and making the animators' work easier; Huang's hat and Yutaka Kouno's and Mayu Ootsuka's clothing were changed. Colour designer Nobuko Mizuta was disappointed because much of the series is set at night and the main characters' clothing is generally dark-coloured, but she gave the guest characters brightly-coloured clothes. Komori said that when he drew female characters, he paid special attention to the line connecting her buttocks and legs. The series's first opening scene has a silhouetted nude woman following Hei, which had to be corrected in subsequent episodes. The artist had mixed emotions about sexualizing female characters but in the end decided to sexualize them to appeal to the audience.

=== Casting ===
Hei was voiced in Japanese by Hidenobu Kiuchi. Kiuchi described Hei as a professional killer who carried out missions as a Contractor under the Syndicate's orders and assumed the identity of Li Shun Sheng, a Chinese university student living in an apartment. He stated that while Li was a warm person, Hei presented an emotionless, cold facade, giving the character two personalities that made him a mystery to Kiuchi when he began recording the anime. He encountered several dilemmas while voicing the character, including whether he should express more emotion as a Contractor. In retrospect, Kiuchi named Hei as one of his favorite characters.

Among other recurring characters, Nana Mizuki voiced Misaki Kirihara. Mizuki noted her cool composure and significant responsibilities as a police officer. She emphasized a masculine phrasing and an imperious tone, describing Kirihara as a mature career woman—a type of role she had rarely played before, which initially made her nervous. When describing the series's cast, Mizuki compared it to James Bond narratives, citing the two main characters as spies who attracted women while working, a point further emphasized by Hei's popularity among female viewers. She believed the key to Hei's popularity was how he switched between his Contractor and Li personas. Meanwhile, Yin was voiced by Misato Fukuen, who said the cast was shrouded in mystery and viewers learned their true nature as they watched more episodes. Like Mizuki, Fukuen found Hei popular enough to attract a new heroine in most episodes.

In the English dub of the series, Hei was voiced by Jason Liebrecht. Liebrecht said that director Zach Bolton cast everyone to sound as natural as possible. When asked whether Hei was a protagonist or an antagonist, Liebrecht described the character as conflicted, calling him a "hitman with a conscience". Liebrecht named it one of his favorite voice-dubbing experiences and was glad that Hei's voice was close to his own.

=== Music ===
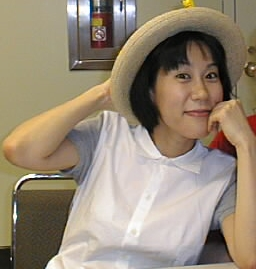
Yoko Kanno composed the score of the first Darker than Black series

The series's soundtrack was composed by Yoko Kanno in 2007. The series used four pieces of theme music: two opening themes and two ending themes. "Howling" by Abingdon Boys School was used as the opening theme for the first 14 episodes while "Kakusei Heroism (The Hero Without a "Name")" by An Cafe was used as the second opening theme from episodes 15 onwards. "Tsukiakari" (ツキアカリ; lit. 'Moonlight') by Rie fu was used as the ending theme for the first 14 episodes while "Dreams" by High and Mighty Color was used as the second ending theme from episodes 15 onwards. The lyrics of "Howling" focused on Hei's characterization, with Okamura commenting that parts of it delved into elements the character briefly saw.

The soundtrack CD had 20 tracks, including the opening and closing themes performed by Abingdon Boys School and Rie fu. Other non-instrumental songs were written by Tim Jensen and performed by Mai Yamane (tracks eight and 10) and James Wendt (tracks 14 and 19). It peaked at number 57 on the Oricon albums chart. Tensai Okamura wanted 1970s-type folk music which would convey the impression of darkness.

When approached by Okamura, Kanno recalled being given ideas about a detective series to give her music a distinctive style. When she began composing the soundtrack, she did not have a scenario or setting in mind when she met Okamura again. Some of the background music was typical Kanno as heard in Ghost in the Shell: Stand Alone Complex, but other tracks were livelier; she wanted to write glamorous songs. Kanno cited old French films as inspiring the music of Darker than Black, wanting it to contrast with the series's emotionless characters; Latin music was another influence, and she appreciated sound director Kazuhiro Wakabayashi's assistance with the soundtrack.

== Release ==
Darker than Black was conceived by Tensai Okamura and produced by Bones and Aniplex. The series was broadcast on MBS and TBS from April 6 to September 28, 2007. (Note: MBS listed the air dates for the series on Thursday at 25:25, which is Friday at 1:25 a.m. JST.) The series was also streamed on Nifty during its broadcast run. Aniplex collected the episodes on nine DVD sets which were released from July 25, 2007, to March 26, 2008. The ninth and final set included an additional episode, "Beneath Cherry Blossoms in Full Bloom" (黒の契約者- 桜の花の満開の下, Sakura no Hana no Mankai no Shita), which explored the characters' romantic relationships. A Blu-ray box set, which included a guidebook and several unreleased musical tracks not available on the original soundtrack, was released in Japan on September 30, 2009.

On July 1, 2007, Funimation announced at Anime Expo that it had licensed the series. Funimation began streaming the series, with an English dub, in September 2008. They collected the series on six DVD sets, which were released from November 25, 2008, to August 11, 2009. Darker Than Black began airing on the Funimation Channel in September 2010. Funimation released the series on Blu-ray on May 12, 2015. In January 2016, the company announced that its rights to the series had expired. Manga Entertainment released the entire series in a DVD box set in the UK on November 22, 2010. Madman Entertainment released the series in Australia and New Zealand.

=== Sequel ===
A sequel series, Darker than Black: Gemini of the Meteor (Darker Than Black ー流星の双子ー, Dākā Zan Burakku -Ryūsei no Jemini-), was broadcast on MBS and TBS from October 9 to December 25, 2009. (Note: MBS listed the air dates for the series on Thursday at 25:25, which is Friday at 1:25 a.m. JST.) Aniplex collected the episodes in nine DVD/Blu-ray sets, which were released from December 23, 2009, to July 21, 2010. It focuses on the young Russian teenager Suo Pavlichenko who finds Hei who mistakes her for her twin brother Shion and ends up on a journey to find her missing family.

A four-episode original video animation (OVA), Darker than Black: Gaiden (Darker Than Black 外伝, Dākā Zan Burakku Gaiden), was included on the second, fourth, sixth and eighth collected Blu-ray and DVD sets of Darker than Black: Gemini of the Meteor released from January 27 to July 21, 2010. The OVAs are set in the time between the two television series. Hei and Yin have left Tokyo and are on the run from the Syndicate. The closing theme is "Darker Than Black" by Yasushi Ishii. For the English-language release, the OVAs were included in the Gemini of the Meteor compilation.

== Related media ==
A manga adaptation, illustrated by Nokiya, was serialized in Kadokawa Shoten's shōjo manga magazine Monthly Asuka from March 24 to November 24, 2007. Its chapters were collected in two tankōbon volumes, released on August 23, 2007, and January 24, 2008, respectively. The series was licensed for English release in North America by Yen Press, which released both volumes in an omnibus edition on June 15, 2010.

A second manga adaptation, Darker than Black: Shikkoku no Hana (Darker Than Black ー漆黒の花ー, Dākā Zan Burakku -Shikkoku no Hana-; "Darker than Black: Jet Black Flower") illustrated by Yuji Iwahara, the anime series's character designer, was serialized in Square Enix's seinen manga magazine Young Gangan from May 15, 2009, to January 21, 2011. The manga is set one year after the events of the main series, and focuses on Hei on a mission to stop one Contractor from giving civilians the chance to become like him. Square Enix collected its chapters in four tankōbon volumes, which were released from October 24, 2009, to March 25, 2011.

Two fanbooks, Darker than Black: The Black Contractor Official Fan Book – Tokyo Explosion Investigation Report (Darker Than Black-黒の契約者- Official Fanbook トーキョーエクスプロージョン調査報告, Dākā Zan Burakku -Kuro no Keiyakusha- Ofisharu Fanbukku Tōkyō Ekusupurōjon Chōsa Hōkoku) and Darker than Black: Gemini of the Meteor: Official Fan Book – Mitaka Document Analysis Report (Darker Than Black-流星の双子- Official Fanbook 三鷹文書分析報告, Dākā Zan Burakku -Ryūsei no Jemini- Ofisharu Fanbukku Mitaka Bunsho Bunseki Hōkoku), were published by Square Enix on October 24, 2009, and September 25, 2010, respectively. The characters Hei and Suo also appear in Heroes Phantasia, a 2012 role-playing game by Witchcraft.

== Reception ==
=== Popularity ===
The series received a jury recommendation in the "Animation Division/Long Animation" category at the 2007 Japan Media Arts Festival. At the 2008 Society for the Promotion of Japanese Animation awards, Hei was ranked second in the "best male anime character" category; Kazuhiro Wakabayashi was named best casting director; Darker than Black placed second in the television series category and second for original score; and Okamura ranked fifth in the best-director category. Hei proved popular in Japan, finishing seventh in the "Best Male Character" category of Animage's 2010 Anime Grand Prix. In a Newtype poll, he was the 10th-most-popular male anime character of the 2000s. Okamura was surprised by Hei's popularity and did not want him to be an archetypal mature and stylish ikemen character. Although there was concern during production about Hei's suitability as the protagonist of an action anime, the character attracted female fans.

The home media releases of the series were successful in Japan, including the Blu-ray box. In the United Kingdom, the series was nominated for the 2009 NEO Award for Best Anime. It won the "Best Original Anime" award from Japanese magazine GoGoplex. Japanator named Darker than Black one of the best anime of the 2000s, describing it as a beautifully animated show by BONES that would appeal to viewers seeking a dark and serious series.

=== Critical response ===
Critical response to the series has been generally positive. Theron Martin of Anime News Network found the setting unclear but praised the narrative and cast. Reviewers noted that the fight scenes and the handling of the Contractors contrasted with the more lighthearted parts of the narrative. The series's final episodes received mixed reviews; Hei's character arc and his relationships with Amber and Yin were praised, but the ending was considered rushed. Sandra Scholes of Active Anime considered most of the characters generally three-dimensional and the narrative compelling. John Oppliger of AnimeNation said that the series was less popular in Japan than in the West, and that the Japanese audience was surprised by a sequel. The series was compared to X-Men comics for its handling of supernatural fighters, and to Cowboy Bebop for Hei's enigmatic characterization and stylishness.

The series's Japanese and English voice acting was praised, although O'Neil suggested that deliveries were better executed in later episodes, while Todd Douglass Jr. of DVD Talk suggested the English dub for better immersion into the narrative. Tomoko Kawakami's performance as Amber, the actress's final work before her death, was called "solid"; Jason Liebrecht's Hei was described as "a schizophrenic variation" of Syaoran from Tsubasa: Reservoir Chronicle. Martin said that the Japanese and English voice actors synched well with the video. "Howling" by Abingdon Boys School and "Tsukiakari" by Rie fu were good contrasting themes in the series. The second opening theme, "Kakusei Heroism" by An Cafe, was praised; "Dreams" by High and Mighty Color was said to lack the appeal of the first ending, "Tsukiakari". Yoko Kanno's score was described as "unintrusive" by Scott Green of Ain't it Cool News for the variety of instruments used for background music, while Carl Kimlinger of Anime News Network commented that it "achieve[d] a sort of synergy, pouring their considerable skills into a sequence of silent beauty and power".

Charles Webb of MangaLife reviewed Nokiya's manga and gave it a C. He found the plot confusing and the emotionless Contractors to be stiff and prop-like. Webb identified an "Equilibrium Syndrome", which he described as high-concept science fiction undermined by shaky scripting. However, he praised the volume's compact packaging and widescreen action scenes. Ultimately, he concluded that the story did not deserve such strong production values.

=== Themes ===
A cosplayer of Hei wearing the Pierrot mask

Maxibe Gee of the University of York described Hei as a "posthuman noir" protagonist, comparable to Rick Deckard in Do Androids Dream of Electric Sheep?, Motoko Kusanagi in Ghost in the Shell, and Vincent Freeman in Gattaca (1997), citing their shared backgrounds and cruelty. Gee noted similarities in how their actions demonstrated moral ambiguity and personal desires. In Hei's case, Gee focused on his relationship with the humans known as Dolls, describing identities "formed by encompassing others, embracing the team of both humans and posthumans". Gee observed that Hei and Yin, as strangers in a strange land, resembled foreigners, and that Hei's morality was more varied than that of the Dolls or other Contractors. As a noir protagonist, Hei was betrayed in the second episode by a femme fatale who was a Doll rather than a human woman attracted to him. Gee compared Hei's characterization and growth with Jerold J. Abrams' commentary on the handling of noir, stating that Hei "is defined by the journey he takes to understand his dual human/posthuman nature and his inability to come to terms with what he is."

Hei's Pierrot mask was considered a defense mechanism, compared with the darker personas of characters such as Himura Kenshin from Rurouni Kenshin and Vash the Stampede from Trigun. According to Scott Green of Ain't It Cool News, "The mask identity is often a fun engine to exciting escapades. If the reason for adopting the mask is credible, the true personality gives the character depth." During the series, Hei wore and removed the mask to show different sides of his personality, neither of which was his true persona. His personality was a mixture of both sides, with Li providing comic relief.

Matthew Magnus Lundeen of GameRant called Hei a "Super-Powered Noir" and found the main cast generally mysterious, in contrast to the handling of Cowboy Bebop, due to Hei's friendlier civilian persona being a facade he created to interact with others. Lundeen stated that the series stood out among other noir or police drama series by focusing on supernatural elements combined with aesthetics comparable to those of series such as Batman and Batman Beyond. He noted that the Contracts appeared to be powerful fighters, but the nature that led to their current selves questioned ideas of what made them human and made Hei question his own, as the writer claimed there was never a black-and-white morality. Natalie Lambert of ComicBook.com compared the series with other dark settings, such as those from Durarara! and Psycho-Pass, as well as the themes presented in such stories.
