= Shōtarō Suga =

Japanese screenwriter

Shōtarō Suga 菅 正太郎
- Born: December 31, 1972; Tokyo, Japan
- Died: March 19, 2015 (aged 42)
- Occupation: Screenplay writer
- Years active: 1999–2015 (Note: Suga's series composition and scriptwriting work on Dimension W was posthumously released in 2016.)

Shōtarō Suga (菅 正太郎, Suga Shōtarō) (December 31, 1972–March 19, 2015) was a Japanese screenwriter. He was famous for writing multiple anime series, most notably Darker than Black.

== Biography ==
Suga was born in Tokyo, Japan. He worked in multiple series from Production I.G, including Blood+ and Ghost in the Shell: Stand Alone Complex. Suga recalls having problems with the latter's characters, most notably Motoko Kusanagi in regards to how their personalities work. Director Kenji Kamiyama often relied on Suga's work when working for such series. Despite the series' futuristic setting, Suga claimed that he aimed to give the audience modern themes to see in the anime.

Suga, the most important writer in the 2007 Darker than Black series, handles high concept and main plot related arc, with Hei on the spotlight. With Suga's control of the last few arcs, with the Doll selling as example, the stories starts to converge, and the ending is designed by Suga. For the 2010 original video animations Darker than Black: Gaiden Tensai Okamura gave Suga complete freedom and all he asked was that a scene with rain be put in. The scene plays in the third episode when Xin-Qi forces the Contractors to attack Hei.

Other works include Lagrange: The Flower of Rin-ne, My Youth Romantic Comedy Is Wrong, As I Expected (seasons 1–2), One Week Friends, The Seven Deadly Sins (season 1), and Dimension W. The Fandom Post considers Dimension W as a response to criticism aimed towards Darker than Black.

Suga heavily wrote for the overall Resident Evil IP from 2008 to 2012. He scripted Resident Evil: The Darkside Chronicles and Resident Evil 6, the manga tie-in Resident Evil: The Marhawa Desire and the movies Resident Evil: Degeneration and Resident Evil: Damnation. For the latter, Suga went to Eastern Europe and created East Slavic Republic, a fictional post-Soviet country formed following the dissolution of the Soviet Union. In retrospect, Suga claims that Damnation surpassed Degeneration.

== Death ==
Suga died on March 19, 2015. The cause of his death was not disclosed.

Upon his death, Kenji Kamiyama wrote that he was glad he met Suga as he often helped him in his works and had a kind personality.

== Screenwriting ==
- series head writer denoted in bold

=== Anime TV ===
- Wild Arms: Twilight Venom (1999–2000)
- Ghost in the Shell: Stand Alone Complex (2002)
- L/R: Licensed by Royalty (2003)
- Ghost in the Shell: Stand Alone Complex 2nd Gig (2004)
- Eureka Seven (2005–2006)
- Blood+ (2005–2006)
- Le Chevalier D'Eon (2006–2007)
- **Darker than Black** (2007)
- Devil May Cry (2007)
- Moribito: Guardian of the Spirit (2007)
- Persona: Trinity Soul (2008)
- Eden of the East (2009)
- Battle Spirits: Shonen Gekiha Dan (2009)
- **Darker than Black: Gemini of the Meteor** (2009)
- Fullmetal Alchemist: Brotherhood (2009–2010)
- Mai no Mahō to Katei no Hi (2011)
- **Lagrange: The Flower of Rin-ne** (2012)
- **My Teen Romantic Comedy SNAFU** (2013)
- **The Eccentric Family** (2013)
- World Conquest Zvezda Plot (2014)
- One Week Friends (2014)
- Argevollen (2014)
- **The Seven Deadly Sins** (2014–2015)
- **My Teen Romantic Comedy SNAFU Too!** (2015)
- **Dimension W** (2016): eps 1–5

=== Anime films ===
- Ghost in the Shell: Stand Alone Complex – Solid State Society (2008)
- Resident Evil: Degeneration (2008)
- Resident Evil: Damnation (2012)

=== OVAs ===
- Lagrange: The Flower of Rin-ne (2012)
  - Kamogawa Days
- My Teen Romantic Comedy SNAFU (2013)
- World Conquest Zvezda Plot (2014)
  - New Zvezda Operation
- The Seven Deadly Sins (2015)
  - Bandit Ban
  - Heroes Fun Time -Extra Stories Compilation-

=== Manga ===
- Resident Evil: The Marhawa Desire

=== Live action TV ===
- Yonigeya Honbo (1999)
- Shin Yonigeya Honbo (2003)

=== Live action film ===
- Casshern (2004)

=== Videogames ===
- Resident Evil: The Darkside Chronicles
- Resident Evil 6
