= Heroes Phantasia =

2012 video game

- Developer: Witchcraft
- Publisher: Bandai Namco Games
- Producer: Kensuke Tsukanaka
- Platform: PlayStation Portable
- Release: JP: January 19, 2012
- Genre: Role-playing
- Mode: Single-player

Heroes Phantasia, also known as Heroes Fantasia, is a role-playing video game developed by Witchcraft and published by Bandai Namco Games for the PlayStation Portable in 2012. It is a Japan-exclusive crossover game featuring characters from various 1990s and 2000s anime series, including Blood+, Darker than Black, Keroro, My-HiME, Orphen, Read or Die, Rune Soldier, s-CRY-ed, and Slayers Revolution.
