= NieA 7 =

Japanese manga and anime series

- NieA_7
- NieA_7 DVD cover vol4

ニアアンダーセブン (Nia Andā Sebun)
- Manga
- Written by: Yoshitoshi Abe
- Published by: Kadokawa Shoten
- Imprint: Kadokawa Comics Ace Extra
- Magazine: Monthly Ace Next
- Original run: October 1999 – January 2001
- Volumes: 2
- Anime television series

NieA under 7 - domestic poor @nimation
- Directed by: Tomokazu Tokoro (Chief); Takuya Satō
- Produced by: Shojiro Abe; Yasuyuki Ueda
- Written by: Takuya Satō
- Music by: Yoshio Owa
- Studio: Triangle Staff
- Licensed by: AUS: Madman Entertainment; NA: Discotek Media; UK: MVM Entertainment
- Original network: WOWOW
- English network: US: ImaginAsian
- Original run: April 26, 2000 – July 19, 2000
- Episodes: 13

NieA_7 (ニアアンダーセブン, Nia Andā Sebun), also known as NieA under 7, is a doujinshi manga series created by graphic designer Yoshitoshi Abe and later published by Kadokawa Shoten on their monthly shōnen manga magazine Monthly Ace Next from October 1999 to January 2001. The manga revolves around a poor, introverted student named Mayuko Chigasaki, who lives above a Japanese bathhouse, and a freeloading, freewheeling outcast alien named NieA, who lives in Mayuko's closet.

The manga is adapted into a 13-episode anime series by Triangle Staff and aired on WOWOW from April 16 to July 19, 2000. Much of the anime's staff also worked on Serial Experiments Lain, as producer Yasuyuki Ueda suggested the team work on a lighter anime as relief from the dark, heavily psychological Serial Experiments Lain. The character Chiaki, a ufology fanatic, shares a name with Chiaki J. Konaka, the script writer for Serial Experiments Lain.

== Plot ==
Set in a retro-future setting, the series revolves around Mayuko Chigasaki, a high school graduate who goes to cram school in preparation for college. However, due to having no place to settle in, she decided to live in a bathhouse in the countryside, which is in a financial crisis due to having no customers. Even worse, she has to live with an alien girl named NieA, who has no antenna and is considered an "under-seven", a class despised by other aliens due to being the lowest of their kind.

The series touches lightly upon issues of discrimination, stereotypes, social alienation, cultural assimilation and city life versus countryside living. Mayuko, who attends a cram school, is a young girl living away from her family and expresses a lot of melancholy. NieA, who is apparently placed in an inferior class by her fellow aliens due to being a physical minority among them, immediately accuses anyone who calls her a "stupid no-antenna" or the like, of discrimination. Other aliens adopt various stereotypical cultural styles, such as Chada who dresses in Indian attire and opens a convenience store, or Karna who chooses to associate herself with the Cultural Revolution. This theme of the outsider alien is carried through in the brief comic live-action sequence which ends each episode, "Dalgit's Tidbit of Indian Information."

== Characters ==
Mayuko Chigasaki (茅ヶ崎まゆ子, Chigasaki Mayuko)
Voiced by: Ayako Kawasumi (Japanese); Tricia Dickson (English)
Mayuko "Mayu" Chigasaki is a student at the Ipponmatsu Cram School who lives in a rented room at the Enohana Bathhouse. She is hardworking, polite, honest, and very self-conscious. Mayuko spends all of her time and energy just making ends meet. She shares an apartment with NieA, who she often refers to as a "freeloader".
NieA (ニア, Nia)
Voiced by: Yuko Miyamura (Japanese); J-Ray Hochfield (English)
NieA is a lower-class or "under-seven" alien, who has no antenna. She lives with Mayuko and builds spaceships out of junk. She shares an apartment with Mayuko, who often argues with her about money and food.
Genzo Someya (染谷 源蔵, Someya Genzō)
Voiced by: Akira Okamori (Japanese); Josh Phillips (English)
Genzo is Mayuko's childhood friend who has dreadlocks and is stoic in nature. He is usually seen carrying sacks of rice or a bottle crate of bottled drinks as a present to Mayuko and NieA.
Chada (チャダ)
Voiced by: Angelino Schintu (Original character voice creator in Japanese & English) (Japanese); Wil Castillo (American dubbing) (English)
Chada is an unintentionally perverted alien disguised as an Indian man. He is the store manager of the AM 11 PM 7 convenience store, where his alien meetings are usually held at noon. He is also the owner of the short-lived Space King Bathhouse as a rival to the Enohana Bathhouse.
Momo Enoshima (荏ノ嶋 モモ, Enoshima Momo)
Voiced by: Chieko Ichikawa (Japanese); Linda Bendik (English)
Momo is an old lady with few words who works at the Enohana Bathhouse.
Chiaki Komatsu (小松ちあき, Komatsu Chiaki)
Voiced by: Fumiko Orikasa (Japanese); Zarah Little (English)
Chiaki is Mayuko's easygoing classmate at the Ipponmatsu Cram School who is also a ufology fanatic. She is usually seen with a laptop full of alien stickers.
Shuhei Karita (狩田手兵, Karita Shuhei)
Voiced by: Hozumi Goda (Japanese); Patrick Seitz (English)
Shuhei is the owner of the Karuchie European Restaurant. He is shown to be clumsy and absentminded.
Chie Karita (狩田智絵, Karita Chie)
Voiced by: Mari Ogasawara (Japanese); Lauren Bendik (English)
Chie is Shuhei's daughter. She is shown to be independent and mature for her age.
Kotomi Hiyama (樋山言実, Hiyama Kotomi)
Voiced by: Rumi Ochiai (Japanese); Robyn Nolting (English)
Kotomi is the current owner and manager of the Enohana Bathhouse, which is in financial crisis due to the scarcity of customers.
Geronimo Hongo (本郷ジェロニモ, Hongō Jeronimo)
Voiced by: Susumu Chiba (Japanese); Justin Gross (English)
Geronimo is an alien who wears sunglasses and a beanie. He attends Chada's alien meetings. He is revealed to be a deadbeat celebrity for a children's show with an antenna shaped like a flower.
Nenji Yoshioka (吉岡 稔持, Yoshioka Nenji)
Voiced by: Takayuki Sugo (Japanese); Eric Da Re (English)
Nenji is the boilerman of the Enohana Bathhouse who has a crush on Kotomi. Ironically, he goes berserk whenever he sees fire.
Karna (カルナ, Karuna)
Voiced by: Tomoko Kawakami (Japanese); Casey Strand (English)
Karna is a higher-class or "high-seven" alien who attends Chada's alien meetings. She has an antenna shaped like a lollipop that can receive Beijing radio broadcasts from across the ocean, but it malfunctions at unexpected moments.

== Media ==
=== Manga ===
NieA_7 was created by Yoshitoshi Abe as an independent doujinshi manga following the end of Serial Experiments Lain. The manga was picked up by Kadokawa Shoten, initially serialized on their monthly magazine Monthly Ace Next from October 1999 to January 2001 with a total of 14 chapters over 2 tankōbon volumes. An artbook titled NieA_7 Scrap was published in June 2001. The manga was republished in a single kanzenban volume on 26 October 2012, under the title NieA_7 Recycle.

==== Chapters ====
No.	Release date	ISBN
Volume 1	July 1, 2000	4-04-713349-3
01. "Strawberry Icecone and Alien" (氷イチゴと宇宙人, Kōri ichigo to uchūjin); 02. "Mysterious Oil and Alien" (謎の油と宇宙人, Nazo no abura to uchūjin); 03. "A Female Manager and a Life with No Roof Over My Head and the Smell and Alien" (女経営者と屋根のない暮らしと鰻の香りと宇宙人, Jo keieisha to yane no nai kurashi to unagi no kaori to uchūjin); 04. "Apple and Honey and Alien" (リンゴとハチミツと宇宙人, Ringo to hachimitsu to uchūjin); 05. "Object X and Alien (First Part)" (物体Xと宇宙人（前編）, Buttai X to uchūjin （zenpen）); 06. "Object X and Alien (Latter Part)" (物体Xと宇宙人（後編）, Buttai X to uchūjin （kōhen）); 07. "Tenpai Fever and Alien" (テンパイフィーバーと宇宙人, Tenpaifībā to uchūjin)
Volume 2	March 29, 2001	4-04-713413-9
08. "Superstar and Alien (First Part)" (スーパースターと宇宙人（前編）, Sūpāsutā to uchūjin （zenpen）); 09. "Superstar and Alien (Latter Part)" (スーパースターと宇宙人（後編）, Sūpāsutā to uchūjin（kōhen）); 10. "Era Flower Communications Area Problems and Alien" (荏の花通信エリア問題と宇宙人, Era no hana tsūshin eria mondai to uchūjin); 11. "Black-and-White Show and Alien" (白黒ショーと宇宙人, Shirokuro shō to uchūjin); 12. "Melancholic Summer and Alien (First Part)" (夏の憂鬱と宇宙人（前編）, Natsu no yūutsu to uchūjin（zenpen）); 13. "Melancholic Summer and Alien (Latter Part)" (夏の憂鬱と宇宙人（後編）, Natsu no yūutsu to uchūjin（kōhen）); 14. "Super Fireworks Show and Alien" (超花火大会と宇宙人, Chō hanabi taikai to uchūjin)

=== Anime ===
The anime adaptation titled NieA under 7 - domestic poor @nimation was animated by Triangle Staff, chief directed by Tomokazu Tokoro and written and directed by Takuya Satō. It aired on the Japanese BS Satellite channel WOWOW from April 16 to July 19, 2000. The opening theme is titled "Koko Made Oide" (ここまでおいで, Koko made oide; lit. Come On Over Here) by SION while the ending theme is titled "Venus to Chiisana Kamisama" (ヴィーナスと小さな神様, Vuīnasu to Chīsana Kamisama; lit. Venus and the Little God) by Maria Yamamoto. For episode 13, the ending theme is "KA MOA'E" by Yoshio Owa.

Geneon Entertainment licensed the anime outside Japan before it went out of print. Discotek Media have rescued the license and released it on DVD and Blu-ray on February 27, 2018.

==== Episodes ====
No.	Title	Original release date	English release date
1	"Alien & Launching UFO Bath" "Uchūjin to uchiage yūfō no yu" (宇宙人と、打ち上げUFOの湯)	April 26, 2000	May 4, 2007
During summer, Mayuko Chigasaki is an impoverished student at the Ipponmatsu Cram School living in a rented room at the Enohana Bathhouse, and NieA is a lower-class alien living in Mayuko's closet. Mayuko does her daily newspaper route early in the morning. NieA persistently asks Mayuko for gourmet food when Mayuko runs late for cram school. After taking the bus and the train there, Mayuko talks with classmate Chiaki Komatsu, who plans to treat Mayuko to an exquisite lunch. However, Mayuko reluctantly invites NieA when she comes out of hiding. Revealed to be a ufology fanatic, Chiaki is interested in seeing a UFO mothership inside a crater which can be viewed from Mayuko's roof. At the bathhouse, Mayuko, NieA and Chiaki are disappointed that the view of the UFO mothership is shrouded in fog. NieA attempts to launch her own UFO built out of junk, only to destroy Mayuko's roof in the process. When taking a bath together, Mayuko allows Chiaki to visit again anytime, though NieA jokes about riding another UFO.
2	"Alien & Violence Cosmic Bath" "Uchūjin to abare uchū buro no yu" (宇宙人と、暴れ宇宙風呂の湯)	May 3, 2000	May 7, 2007
During a management meeting, current bathhouse owner and manager Kotomi Hiyama says that the bathhouse is in financial crisis due to the scarcity of customers. This means that Mayuko will need to volunteer some manual labor until the bathhouse generates enough profit to fix her apartment. Kotomi believes that a new salespoint must be created in order to reach new clientele. Thanks to a suggestion made by Nenji Yoshioka, the boilerman of the bathhouse, Kotomi approves of acquiring cosmic fuel found in the crater, which could be used to prepare baths. Mayuko, NieA and Nenji head to the crater with empty jerrycans in tow. They pass by an alien village, venture through a dangerous jungle and find an oily lake. NieA and Nenji end up destroying a giant Venus flytrap, which ate all of the bento previous prepared by Kotomi. Meanwhile, Kotomi eats lunch with Momo Enoshima, the old lady of the bathhouse. When Mayuko, NieA and Nenji return to the bathhouse, Nenji uses remnants of the Venus flytrap as the cosmic fuel. Despite reaching new clientele, Kotomi is dismayed when the bathhouse goes back into debt after it becomes damaged by more Venus flytraps spawned by the cosmic fuel.
3	"Alien & Radio Noise Bath" "Uchūjin to redio noizu no yu" (宇宙人と、レディオノイズの湯)	May 10, 2000	May 8, 2007
At night, Mayuko and NieA are approached by an Indian man named Chada, who is actually an alien in disguise. As the store manager of the AM 11 PM 7 convenience store built next to the crater, Chada coerces Mayuko and NieA with free bento if Mayuko attends the grand opening and if NieA attends the alien meetings. After her newspaper route in the morning, Mayuko goes to cram school, where Chiaki wishes to view the UFO mothership on a clear day. During an alien meeting, three misfit alien members try Chada's keema curry and rice as a menu item. A higher-class alien named Karna strongly believes that the alien meetings should raise the social status of aliens, but she is frustrated when NieA shows up only for the keema curry. Another alien named Geronimo Hongo arrives during a heated argument between NieA and Karna, who end up throwing pots of keema curry at each other. In the end, all of the alien members go to the bathhouse in order to freshen up from their stench of keema curry.
4	"Alien & Beginner Waitress Bath" "Uchūjin to sin'mai weitoresu no yu" (宇宙人と、新米ウェイトレスの湯)	May 17, 2000	May 9, 2007
Mayuko goes to cram school, where Chiaki learns that Mayuko claims to work as a part-time waitress aside from doing her daily newspaper route. Returning to the bathhouse, Mayuko is furious upon finding out that NieA ate the emergency food supply of canned fish. In the evening, Mayuko goes to work as a part-time food courier at the Karuchie European Restaurant for the owner Shuhei Karita and his daughter Chie Karita. Meanwhile, Mayuko's childhood friend Genzo Someya arrives at the bathhouse with two sacks of white rice, though Nenji tells Genzo where Mayuko actually works. Mayuko and Chie play a fighting game, in which Chie wins thirty consecutive rounds. While Mayuko delivers an order that Shuhei cooks up, Karna arrives to order take-out just when Genzo also arrives. After running into NieA carrying a vintage record player, Mayuko returns to the restaurant. Genzo gives Mayuko a sack of white rice, while Karna argues with NieA over having to order from a shabby restaurant. Chie and Genzo both agree that Karna acted rude, causing Karna to storm out. When Shuhei and Chie prepare to close up the restaurant early, Mayuko thanks Genzo for the sack of white rice before he departs.
5	"Alien & Dried Up Amusements Bath" "Uchūjin to gekikare amūzumento no yu" (宇宙人と、激枯アミューズメントの湯)	May 24, 2000	May 10, 2007
During a management meeting, Kotomi wants to plan an event in order to bring back social interaction within the bathhouse. NieA shows up with a bag full of old motherboards found at a bankrupt amusement arcade, giving Kotomi the brilliant idea of hosting a video game tournament by using the vintage arcade video games. Genzo swings by the bathhouse and gives Mayuko a bottle crate full of bottled drinks before she heads to the restaurant for work in the evening. Karna returns to the restaurant and orders super spicy kimchi for take-out. The next day, Chie and her classmates arrive for the video game tournament. Kotomi explains that a yearlong bathhouse gold passport as a grand prize will be awarded to the challenger who wins three consecutive games, with Nenji first at a role-playing game, Genzo next at a fighting game and Mayuko and NieA last at a shoot 'em up game. After winning the three consecutive games, Chie is surprisingly defeated by Momo as a final boss during a racing game. Chie still receives a fighting spirit trophy for winning the three consecutive games. Unfortunately, Kotomi is upset because the arcade video games used up a lot of electricity.
6	"Alien & Rival Hot Spring Bath" "Uchūjin to raibaru sentō no yu" (宇宙人と、ライバル銭湯の湯)	May 31, 2000	May 11, 2007
When Mayuko and NieA are in need of an air conditioner, Kotomi tasks them to get rid of some useless junk in a storage closet adjacent to their room. Nenji says that the new Space King Bathhouse is setting up shop in the crater as a rivaled competitor, while Chiaki says that it simulates the experience of going into outer space. Chiaki and Genzo are selected as informants, while Mayuko and NieA are tasked with snooping around. As Chiaki and Genzo take a good look inside, Mayuko and NieA find mysterious leaves outside. Chada owns and manages the Space King Bathhouse, much to the surprise of Mayuko and NieA. Returning to the Enohana Bathhouse, Mayuko and NieA bring back a leaf sample, while Chiaki and Genzo behave bizarrely from their experience due to the leaves in the hot bathwater. Kotomi and Nenji find out that the leaf sample came from an illegal plant, and the Space King Bathhouse is forced to close up shop. Gladly, Chiaki and Genzo only endured a temporary effect from the leaves. At night, Mayuko learns that Kotomi wanted to own and manage the Enohara Bathhouse because she really loves the place.
7	"Mothership, Go-Con & Cloudy Skies Bath" "Bosen to gōkon to kumorizora no yu" (母船と合コンと曇り空の湯)	June 7, 2000	May 14, 2007
NieA hears an ominous voice coming from the radio while on the roof. After being summoned to deliver a large order from the restaurant early in the morning, Mayuko is visited by Chiaki, who invites Mayuko to an upcoming college social event called a go-con. Mayuko is later advised by Kotomi to attend the go-con, though NieA believes that it is just about eating food. After Mayuko is introduced to Chiaki's five other female classmates who will be attending the go-con, Mayuko begins to have second thoughts. Her indecisiveness makes her hesitate to get a haircut and wear a beanie. Instead, Mayuko decides to stay at the bathhouse, while Chiaki attends the go-con. Kotomi later tells Mayuko to ask herself if she really wanted to attend the go-con. A gloomy Mayuko gives NieA a plate of grilled fish and prepares for bedtime. NieA instigates that the ominous voice heard on the roof may have come from the UFO mothership, but Mayuko takes out her frustration on NieA for not having an antenna.
8	"Melancholy & Cast-Off Summer Bath" "Yūutsu to natsu no nukegara no yu" (ゆーうつと、夏のぬけがらの湯)	June 14, 2000	May 15, 2007
At cram school, Mayuko expresses melancholy despite placing seventh on the top fifty scores of the practice college entrance exam, though she humbly apologizes to Chiaki's five female classmates for not attending the go-con. Returning to the bathhouse, Mayuko takes a bath by herself after learning from Nenji that NieA is attending another alien meeting with free bento meals. During the alien meeting, the three misfit alien members try Chada's curry nabe and poppy seed curry as menu items, but Karna reminds Chada that the alien meetings should raise the social status of aliens. Showing up to eat free food, NieA later describes the ominous voice supposedly coming from the UFO mothership as something softly reverberating in her mind like a song. Since the UFO mothership has been broken for years, Karna does not believe that the UFO mothership is trying to communicate with NieA. Later at night, NieA returns to the bathhouse, where Mayuko saved two croquettes as part of a homemade one-course dinner. NieA senses that Mayuko has been acting cranky lately, but Mayuko accuses NieA of being freeloading and brainless.
9	"Close Encounter & After the Rain Bath" "Sekkin sōgū to ameagari no yu" (接近遭遇と、雨あがりの湯)	June 21, 2000	May 16, 2007
Assuming that Mayuko has been cranky due to a lack of nutrition, NieA sneaks out of the bathhouse early in the morning to see a junk dealer and tries to sell valuable junk. Although the valuable junk is only worth five yen, the junk dealer offers to pay her if she can recover rare items at a reclaimed land that is fenced in. NieA has a close encounter with the UFO mothership during her scavenger hunt deep in the reclaimed land. Meanwhile, Mayuko decides to play hooky from cram school, and she invites Genzo to her room while having barley tea. As it begins to rain outside, Genzo notices that Mayuko kept her deceased father's watch as a memento. Mayuko tells Genzo that she does not know her career plans exactly, though Genzo encourages Mayuko to write new stories because they always made him happy since their childhood. After the rain stops, a rainbow shines in the sky. Later on, NieA gets swindled into purchasing Chada's keema curry colored soft-shelled turtle plastic model kit. NieA eats the two croquettes and takes a bath by herself, as she recalls that the UFO mothership communicated to her by saying sayonara.
10	"Glow of the Firefly & Nocturne Bath" "Hotarubi to yasōkyoku no yu" (蛍火と、夜想曲の湯)	June 28, 2000	May 17, 2007
NieA tries to beg for seconds when Mayuko serves white rice and pickled plums for breakfast. Mayuko then serves some barley tea to Nenji and Kotomi. At the restaurant, Mayuko is surprised when Shuhei and Chie have booked a private party. Mayuko and Chie go to the supermarket in order to pick up some ingredients, including tomatoes, cucumbers, bok choy, olive oil, cabbage and potatoes. They share an ice cream bar while sitting together at a fountain. It is revealed that Shuhei was a former artist before Chie was born, until Shuhei opened his own restaurant after Chie was born. When the private party at the restaurant wraps up in the evening, Shuhei and Chie make their way to the bathhouse, coming across a sparkle of fireflies in a field supposedly saying their farewells. While on the roof, NieA begins to wonder what the UFO mothership meant by saying sayonara. Mayuko takes a bath late at night before finding the vintage record player on the roof, but NieA is nowhere to be found.
11	"NieA_7 Bath (Former Part)" "Nia andā sebun no yu (Zenpen)" (にあ・あんだーせぶんの湯(前篇))	July 5, 2000	May 18, 2007
As NieA has not returned as of yet, Mayuko begins to worry. At cram school, Mayuko apologizes to Chiaki for not attending the go-con. Mayuko recalls that both Chiaki and Genzo described NieA as freewheeling. Returning to the bathhouse, Mayuko overhears Kotomi, Nenji and Momo having a management meeting, discussing a possible buyout for the bathhouse, which has been weighing heavily on Kotomi. The next morning, Mayuko is approached by Chada, who has been looking for NieA. Nenji does not know where NieA has been either. Mayuko spends another day at cram school and at the restaurant. While on the roof at night, Mayuko tells Kotomi that NieA has been missing for the past few days. After Mayuko mentions that NieA heard the UFO mothership communicating with her, Kotomi describes NieA as freewheeling. With the bathhouse on the verge of closing down, NieA still has not returned as of yet.
12	"NieA_7 Bath (Latter Part)" "Nia andā sebun no yu (Kōhen)" (にあ・あんだーせぶんの湯(後編))	July 12, 2000	May 21, 2007
Mayuko learns that Kotomi hired a roofer to repair Mayuko's roof. While venturing through the jungle in the crater, Mayuko realizes that the summer season is about to end. After it has been a week since the disappearance of NieA, Mayuko learns that the government only keeps records of aliens ranked from high-five to under-five, meaning that NieA is not a registered alien. Later on, Mayuko receives a package from her mother. The package contains old photographs of the bathhouse years ago, implying that Mayuko spent her childhood at the bathhouse. The clothing that NieA usually wears is spotted in the dressing room as Mayuko prepares to take a bath, soon noticing that NieA is already taking a bath and back to her old antics. As Mayuko and NieA fight over dinner, a typhoon watch is in effect and the tarp over the hole in the roof begins to loosen. Mayuko and NieA hold down the tarp in the midst of their argument, but NieA blankly stares at the UFO mothership, which is revealed as a sparkle of fireflies taking its shape. The UFO mothership dissipates while the heavy rainstorm immediately ceases, which starts the autumn season.
13	"Time Flows By in Enohana Bath" "Enohana ni toki wa nagareru no yu" (荏の花に、時は流れるの湯)	July 19, 2000	May 22, 2007
NieA persistently asks Mayuko for gourmet food when Mayuko runs late for cram school yet again. The college entrance exam will take place in less than six months. Chiaki is saddened that the UFO mothership has disappeared. Mayuko realizes that nobody seemed to care when NieA momentarily disappeared or when the UFO mothership recently disappeared. Just as Shuhei and Chie prepare to take the first bath of the day, Mayuko and Chiaki soon arrive at the bathhouse. NieA has been seen carrying a large curry bowl while being chased by Chada. As Mayuko and Chiaki hang out on the roof, Mayuko decides to enjoy her time at the bathhouse instead of worrying about it closing down. Mayuko admits that she was depressed because she felt that something was missing in her life. At sunset, Chiaki prepares to go home, while Genzo brings three sacks of white rice. Suddenly, NieA launches her new UFO built out of junk, with the large curry bowl used as the dome. As soon as Chiaki hitches a ride with NieA, the UFO malfunctions and explodes on Mayuko's roof.
