= Haibane Renmei =

Japanese anime television series

灰羽連盟
- Genre: Fantasy; Coming-of-age
- Created by: Yoshitoshi Abe
- Dōjinshi
- By Yoshitoshi Abe: Haibane Renmei (1998); The Haibane of Old Home: Chapter 1 (2001); The Haibane of Old Home: Chapter 2 (2002); Haibane Lifestyle Diary (2002); The Haibane of Old Home: Extra Edition (2002)
- Anime television series
- Directed by: Tomokazu Tokoro
- Produced by: Takeo Haruna; Hideki Goto; Yasuyuki Ueda; Yoshinobu Iwaya
- Written by: Yoshitoshi Abe
- Music by: Kow Otani
- Studio: Radix Ace Entertainment
- Licensed by: AUS: Universal/Sony; NA: Crunchyroll, LLC; UK: MVM Films
- Original network: Fuji TV
- Original run: 10 October 2002 – 19 December 2002
- Episodes: 13
- icon

Haibane Renmei (灰羽連盟; lit. "Grey Feather Federation") (Note: The logo for the anime contains the French tagline "Une fille qui a des ailes grises", meaning "A girl who has grey wings".) is a 2002 Japanese anime television series based on an unfinished dōjinshi manga series by Yoshitoshi Abe, The Haibane of Old Home (オールドホームの灰羽達, Ōrudo-hōmu no Haibane-tachi). The 13-episode series was directed by Tomokazu Tokoro, animated by Radix, and produced by Yasuyuki Ueda. The soundtrack was composed by Kow Otani. It first aired on Fuji TV between October and December 2002.

The series follows Rakka, a newly hatched haibane (Note: lit. 'charcoal feathers'. Also translated as 'gray' or 'ash-colored feathers' or 'wings'.) (a being resembling an angel (Note: The tagline of the show is "They look like angels but they are not angels. A story of haibane." (In Japanese: 天使のようで天使ではない 少女（ハイバネ）たちの物語。))), as she navigates her new life in the city of Glie, a walled town with a single gate through which only a mysterious group, the Toga, are allowed to enter or exit.

Abe had previously worked with Ueda as the character designer for Serial Experiments Lain, which Ueda had co-produced and created. Ueda approached Abe with an offer to make The Haibane of Old Home into an anime; Abe agreed and wrote the screenplay for the anime, continuing the story that was outlined in the two-chapter dōjinshi. The story has been noted for its ambiguity and introspective nature, applying a range of spiritual symbols to convey themes of sin and redemption. Its setting and focus on lost memories have been compared to surrealist stories by Haruki Murakami, with Abe citing Hard-Boiled Wonderland and the End of the World as a specific influence.

Seen as a cult classic, Haibane Renmei has received positive critical reception, with specific praise for its orchestral soundtrack, atmosphere, and restrained color scheme. Assessments of its visuals have varied over time; initial reviews commended its dreamlike style, while later ones critiqued the lack of quality control and flatness of the art. It has been released on physical media several times. Originally licensed by Pioneer Entertainment (which was later acquired to form NBC Universal Entertainment Japan), the first English dub of the anime was released as four DVD volumes from 2003 to 2005. Its license is held by Crunchyroll in North America, MVM in Europe, and Universal Sony Pictures Home Entertainment in Australia. In July 2010, a six-disc HD remastered Blu-ray version was released in Japan.

== Plot ==
A girl dreams of gently falling through the sky before waking up inside a giant cocoon. Upon breaking out, she is tended to by a group of winged and haloed young women who introduce themselves as haibane. Like her, none of them can remember anything before being born from cocoons, and many are named after an aspect of their dream. They name her Rakka (落下, Rakka) lit. 'falling', and ceremoniously strap a newly forged halo to her head. During the night, Rakka goes through the agonising process of growing wings, while Reki, a senior haibane, cares for her.

Rakka is introduced to Old Home, an abandoned boarding school that, along with the Abandoned Factory, serve as "nests" of the haibane. While visiting the human-populated town at the center of Glie, Rakka witnesses the Toga, a group of traders who are the only ones allowed to pass through the walls that surround the town. A masked figure known as the Communicator serves as the liaison between the town and the Toga. The next day, Rakka meets the Communicator at a temple, who explains that Rakka's livelihood is guaranteed by an organization called the Haibane Renmei, but she must also find work in return.

Working alongside other haibane at a bakery, clock tower, and library, Rakka grows closer to the residents of Glie, but considers herself undeserving of their kindness. Soon after, she receives a solemn goodbye from Kuu, one of the younger haibane; Kuu goes on to disappear during the night, leaving behind a grey halo in the Western Woods. Reki tells Rakka that Kuu may have taken her Day of Flight, in which a haibane is said to have gone beyond the walls. Rakka refuses to believe that Kuu is gone, and begins to develop black blemishes on her wings. She uses scissors to cut off her black feathers, but is caught by Reki, who gives her medicine to hide the blemishes and reveals that her own wings had black feathers from the day she hatched. Reki sees herself as permanently "sin-bound", but says that Rakka's blemishes were a fluke.

Rakka remains despondent, and finds more black spots after running away from a human who tries to touch her wings. She flees the central town, and follows a crow to a well in the Western Woods. After falling down, she finds the bones of another crow, and buries it, feeling that the crow was a protector in her past life. She remains trapped in the well until a group of Toga rescues her. Rakka follows the Toga, and the Communicator finds her after she touches the wall. After she returns to Old Home, Rakka is instructed by the Communicator to work inside the wall and collect light for future halos.

Determined to support Reki, Rakka learns from the Communicator that Reki blames herself for a failed attempt to climb the walls that nearly killed Hyōko, her friend from the Abandoned Factory. The Communicator gives Rakka a small tablet containing Reki's true name, which Rakka delivers after the New Year festival. The name Reki (轢; lit. 'to run over') causes Reki to remember her own dream, in which she stood in front of a moving train and was struck by it. After rejecting Rakka's offer to help, Reki is nearly run over by an apparition of the train, but asks to be saved at the last moment. Rakka saves Reki from the train, causing the name on the tablet to return to Reki (礫; lit. 'pebble/small stone'). Reki goes on to have her Day of Flight, and two new cocoons emerge in Old Home.

== Characters ==
The senior residents of Old Home in the anime. Clockwise from top left: Hikari, Nemu, Kuu, Kana, Reki (middle).

Rakka (落下, Rakka; ラッカ) lit. 'falling'
Voiced by: Ryō Hirohashi (Japanese); Carrie Savage (English)
A new arrival at Old Home, Rakka struggles throughout the series to "find herself," and has trouble escaping from curiosity about her past. She forms many friendships, but her closest is with Reki. Rakka is very quiet and a bit on the withdrawn side. She spends a lot of time pondering her previous existence and the mysteries of what lies beyond the Walls, as well as the origin of the haibane.

Reki (礫, Reki; レキ) lit. 'pebble/small stone'
Voiced by: Junko Noda (Japanese); Erika Weinstein (English)
Reki is a mother figure to the other haibane of Old Home. Reki cannot remember her "cocoon dream," is troubled by her past at Old Home and by vivid and horrible nightmares, which she then paints in an attempt to figure them out. She hatched from her cocoon with black feathers, which she hides with medicine, and has been a haibane for seven years, longer than the others except for Nemu. Her job is to take care of the junior haibane at Old Home, who are called Young Feathers. Reki had a close relationship with Kuramori, the previous caretaker figure at Old Home who was the first haibane to accept her.

Kuu (空, Kū; クウ) lit. 'sky'
Voiced by: Akiko Yajima (Japanese); J-Ray Hochfield (English)
The youngest of the older haibane and the first to take her Day of Flight during the series. Kuu overcame her initial awkwardness to achieve a sense of peace. She develops a close friendship with Rakka and has been a haibane for two years. Outgoing and energetic, Kuu demonstrates surprising knowledge of the town and serves as a good role model for Rakka. She undergoes her Day of Flight halfway into the series, which brings Rakka into emotional tumult.

Nemu (眠, Nemu; ネム) lit. 'sleep'
Voiced by: Kazusa Murai (Japanese); Kirsty Pape (English)
The haibane who has lived longest at Old Home. Nemu's cocoon dream was of herself, sleeping, and her continued sleepiness is a source of teasing from the other haibane. She is an old friend of Reki, works at the library, and has been a haibane for nine years. Nemu is often the voice of reason and calm during times of trouble and, like Reki, holds back the secret of a troubled past. She is close with Sumika, the former senior librarian, and treats her like a younger relative.

Kana (河魚, Kana; カナ) lit. 'river fish'
Voiced by: Eri Miyajima (Japanese); Zarah Little (English)
A mechanically inclined tomboy, Kana works at the clock tower in the center of town. Kana has been a haibane for three years. Kana has a bit of a whimsical side to her as she reveals to Rakka that she wonders about the world outside the walls as well. She has an overeager personality, which causes friction with her grouchy master at the clock tower, but they have a shared passion for their line of work. Despite her confident attitude, Kana is sensitive and cares deeply for her friends, showing almost as much sadness as Rakka for Kuu's loss before grudgingly accepting it.

Hikari (光, Hikari; ヒカリ) lit. 'light'
Voiced by: Fumiko Orikasa (Japanese); Hunter Mackenzie Austin (English)
A serious haibane with a mischievous streak. She works in a bakery in town and has been a haibane for four years. Hikari has a tendency to be a bit forgetful, such as forgetting to tell Rakka to practice moving her wings before her trip to the Haibane Renmei Temple. She is depicted with an innovative side, such as experimenting at the bakery with the halo mold to make ring-shaped pastries. Austin, Hikari's English voice actor, described Hikari as "really shy, and always trying to help."

Hyōko (氷湖, Hyōko; ヒョウコ) lit. 'ice lake'
Voiced by: Chihiro Suzuki (Japanese); Josh Phillips (English)
Prominent member of the second, co-ed group of haibane in Glie who live at the Abandoned Factory on the opposite side of town from Old Home. Was a friend of Reki in the past, and was severely injured when they tried to cross the wall together. Upon first meeting Rakka, he accidentally upsets her with a remark about Kuu's recent Day of Flight. Despite his tough exterior, he is shown to be very kind, such as sending Rakka pastries and an apology note for the incident.

Midori (緑, Midori; ミドリ) lit. 'green'
Voiced by: Manabi Mizuno (Japanese); Stephanie Sheh (credited as Jennifer Sekiguchi) (English)
A haibane from the Abandoned Factory and a close friend of Hyōko. Has an ongoing grudge against Reki for her past endangerment of Hyōko but is willing to talk with Rakka and others.

The Communicator (話師, Washi)
Voiced by: Tamio Ōki (Japanese); Michael McConnohie (English)
A presiding official of the Haibane Renmei who gives spiritual advice and worldly assistance and, occasionally, imposes punishments on haibane who break the rules. The Communicator is the only person who can speak with the Toga on their visits to the town. He wishes for the Day of Flight to come to all the haibane successfully and feels concerned that Reki refuses to heed his advice and attempts to help her. Analyses have raised the possibility of the Communicator being a failed haibane.

Kuramori (暗森, Kuramori; lit. 'dark forest')
Voiced by: Aya Hisakawa (Japanese); Wendee Lee (English)
A haibane who cared for the young Nemu and Reki. Despite her delicate health, she was kind and helpful to them, especially to Reki in dealing with her black wings. Kuramori took her Day of Flight five years before the start of the series but remains vivid in the memories of Reki and Nemu, the only ones remaining to remember her. She is the oldest Haibane to be shown in the series.

Toga (トーガ, Tōga)
The Toga are the only people who can enter and leave the city of Glie at will. The Toga never speak, save for communicating in sign language to the Communicator (who represents the link between the citizens of Glie and the Haibane Renmei), and they never reveal their faces. Human and haibane alike are told to keep their distance from the Toga.

Sumika (スミカ, Sumika)
Voiced by: Tomoe Hanba (Japanese); Sharon McWilliams (English)
A librarian, senior of Namu. When Rakka first worked at the library, she planned to leave four days later for maternity leave. However, she remained in the library during winter.

=== Young Feathers ===
The youngest haibane at Old Home. Unlike their senior counterparts, their names are chosen based on aspirations.

Dai (ダイ, Dai)
Voiced by: Kumiko Higa (Japanese); J.D. Stone (English)
A haibane who was originally from Abandoned Factory, but lives in Old Home most of the time.

Shorta (ショータ, Shōta)
Voiced by: Masumi Asano (Japanese); Karen McCarthy (English)
A haibane whose name is short for shortcake.

Hana (ハナ, Hana)
Voiced by: Ai Tokunaga (Japanese); Rachel Hirschfeld (English)
A haibane who taught Rakka how to move her wings.

== Background and production ==
=== Dōjinshi ===
Haibane Renmei is based on a dōjinshi (同人誌) of the same title by Yoshitoshi Abe. Set in a Shibuya-like city, it contains a series of vignettes about people with halos and grey wings. Abe stated that the dōjinshi inspired later Haibane works and his character designs in Niea 7.

In 2002, Abe released The Haibane of Old Home, a dōjinshi that featured new characters and a different setting. The first two issues depict Rakka's hatching, naming, and the emergence of her wings.

Following this, Abe released two special dōjinshi: Haibane Lifestyle Diary and The Haibane of Old Home—Extra Edition. In Lifestyle Diary, Abe announces that the story has been licensed as a TV-aired anime that will contain the remaining plot of the series. As a supplementary work, Lifestyle Diary covers the specifics of character design, from personality to shoe style, and lay out maps of the town and some of its buildings. It features several four-panel comics depicting the lives and behaviors of the specific haibane, including the protagonist Rakka's curiosity about her halo and wings. The Extra Edition is a flashback story from the perspective of Reki, shortly after her mentor, Kuramori, left their home. It was released shortly after the completion of the anime series; Abe writes that Reki's flashbacks were initially cut from the anime's script, which spurred him to include them in the Extra Edition.

=== Conception and influences ===
Publication as an independent dōjinshi was necessitated by the experimental nature of the work. Abe later revealed that he made up the story as he wrote, having no firm plan in place for the characters and plot. Commercial magazines, on the other hand, would have required adherence to deadlines and page quotas in addition to a solid plan for the series.

The series was influenced by, and is often compared to, Haruki Murakami's 1985 novel Hard-Boiled Wonderland and the End of the World. Both works share a common setting of a walled town inhabited by memoryless residents, and some individual elements were also borrowed, such as birds as a recurring motif. The novel was Abe's favourite at the time; he confessed to having read it more than ten times. Another influence was Hirokazu Kore-eda's 1998 Japanese film After Life, which also features recently deceased people struggling to move on. In an online magazine column, Abe described Haibane Renmei as his greatest piece of work.

=== Production ===
Concept art depicting Rakka, as drawn by Yoshitoshi Abe

Having started to write The Haibane of Old Home, Abe was approached by producer Yasuyuki Ueda, with whom he had previously collaborated on Serial Experiments Lain as a character designer, who proposed turning it into an anime. The series was animated by Radix Ace Entertainment and completed in a relatively short time, lasting in whole approximately six months. By May 2002, Abe had finished writing the initial plot for the series, and the production of later episodes continued while the series had started airing. Abe was still writing the script for the final episode after episode 7 had aired; a producer from Radix told Abe that the finale would be a recap episode if the script was not finished in two days' time.

Akira Takada is credited as the sole character designer, but the designs for the main cast, along with the overall visual style of the series, were drawn from the original dōjinshi. In an interview, Abe noted that the main character Rakka's design had changed the most during the course of the development, becoming rather different from his own drawings.

=== Music ===
Kow Otani composed the original musical score for the series, including the opening theme "Free Bird". The score, described as a blend of 17th-century music, Celtic, and jazz, predominantly features instrumentals with a strong reliance on traditional Western instruments such as guitar, piano, flutes, and drums. The ending theme "Blue Flow" was performed by Masumi Itou.

Haibane Renmei: Hanenone
No.	Title	Length
1.	"Refrain of Memory"	4:07
2.	"Free Bird"	2:31
3.	"Toga"	2:48
4.	"Breath of a germ"	2:20
5.	"Starting of the world"	2:03
6.	"A little plates Rondo"	2:16
7.	"Silent Wonderland ~REM Dream~"	2:22
8.	"Song of Dream, Words of Bubble"	2:13
9.	"Rustle"	2:50
10.	"Shadow of Sorrow"	2:41
11.	"Blight"	3:11
12.	"Wondering"	4:00
13.	"Fading"	2:33
14.	"Ripples by the drop"	2:07
15.	"Someday, Lasting, Seranade"	2:13
16.	"Love will light the way"	5:14
17.	"Ethereal Remains"	2:22
18.	"Blue Flow TV Edit"	1:26
19.	"Ailes Grises"	2:38
Total length:		51:03

== Themes and analysis ==
Haibane Renmei is, as the title suggests, a story with various things in gray, that is, a story with many ambiguous factors. It is not a story to find answers, but one to wonder about the answers.

— Yoshitoshi Abe, Animerica interview (2003)

Eschatology is a major theme in the series. The walled city of Glie is often interpreted to be a form of purgatory or limbo, and the story arc a journey toward redemption, salvation, or forgiveness. Previous-life suicide of at least one of the main characters, Reki, is implied. Professor Susan J. Napier suggests all the other haibane are suicide victims as well, seeing a "bleak" reference to the high suicide rates among Japanese youth. (Note: She argues that the Japanese meaning of the names of the haibane tend to support this interpretation, explaining that 'Reki' refers to a vehicle running over a body. 'Kana' lit. 'river fish' could refer to drowning; Rakka lit. 'falling' and Kuu lit. 'sky' to a death by falling.)

Several academics have analyzed Christian imagery in the series. With the caveat that series creator Yoshitoshi Abe denies that haibane are Christian angels, Marc Hairston finds Christian influences in the visual designs of the winged and haloed haibane. He notes that the traditional Christian portrayal of angels is quickly subverted; rather than superior beings, the haibane are treated as second-class citizens in Glie. Hairston juxtaposes Christian conceptions of grace against Reki's character arc, suggesting that Reki's redemption came through both her own actions and through the grace offered by Rakka, an outside force. Writing for Australian children's literature magazine Magpies, Mio Bryce finds similarities between Reki's vocation as a "stepping stone" for the salvation of other Haibane with the life of Christ.

The concept of 'sin' is referred to several times in the series. The show addresses the "Circle of Sin", encapsulated by the Communicator, who says that "one who recognizes their own sin, has no sin." Comparing the question to a Buddhist kōan, Hairston describes the Circle of Sin as a "paradoxical riddle," one that Rakka only overcomes by accepting help from another. This, he argues, allows Rakka to achieve enlightenment in the form of escaping her sin-bound status. Mio Bryce rejects a direct parallel to Christian or Buddhist concepts for 'sin' in the series; she instead suggests that the phrase represents self-imposed isolation, as the two sin-bound haibane both suffer from the refusal to ask for help.

Haibane Renmei introduces many mysteries over the course of the series, leaving most of them unanswered and up to interpretation. The exact nature of the haibane, Toga, and the world of Glie are never explained. The audience is not shown what, if anything, lies beyond the wall or what happens to the characters after their Day of Flight. The creators have deliberately maintained this ambiguity and refused to elaborate on these points in interviews; Yoshitoshi Abe has stated that he does not want to impose his personal views on the viewers.

== Broadcast and distribution ==
The series was originally broadcast in Japan on Fuji TV from 10 October to 19 December 2002, airing on an irregular schedule. Although originally intended to be a weekly broadcast spanning three months, the schedule was accelerated, resulting in gaps of two weeks surrounding the broadcast of the second episode, as well as the final eight episodes being shown in two-episode pairs. Producer Yasuyuki Ueda called this change "painful" and later blamed it for contributing to the initial lukewarm reception of the anime.

Over the years, the series has had several physical releases. In Japan, before the airing of the series, a DVD containing three minutes of promotion video was sold on Comic Market 62 in August 2002. Following the airing, Geneon Entertainment released a total of five DVD sets of Haibane Renmei between December 2002 and April 2003. Additionally, a HD remastered version of the anime was released in a Blu-ray box set in July 2010. The series was first licensed and dubbed into English in North America by Geneon USA (named Pioneer Entertainment at the time), which published DVD releases from April 2003 to October 2005. In 2010, Funimation (now Crunchyroll, LLC) obtained the license for the show, along with a handful of other Geneon properties, and released a new boxed DVD set in 2012. In Europe, the series was licensed by MVM Films, who initially distributed a DVD version and later issued a Blu-ray release in 2021. Madman Entertainment first released the series in Australia, before Sony acquired the license in 2013.

A comic based on the television series was published by Dark Horse Comics in April 2006.

== Reception ==
The anime has been regarded positively in Japan and internationally. Domestically, the show's initial limited popularity was attributed to a strained release schedule, and critics describe the show as a cult classic. It featured in the 2018 anime guide Life-Changing Anime (人生を変えるアニメ, Jinsei o Kaeru Anime), published by Kawade Shobō Shinsha. The English-language Encyclopedia of Science Fiction states that the anime is "viewed by many as a classic." Japanese newspaper Sankei Shimbun described the anime as a "hidden gem". Some critics have described it as a slow-paced, atmospheric, and philosophical series, giving particular praise for its tone of mystery, distinctive art style, and soundtrack. The series has been compared to Aria the Animation for its tranquil atmosphere. Writing for Animation World magazine, Andrew Osmond noted that both shows "forecasted" the popularity of sub-genres such as iyashikei and slice of life in the 2000s and 2010s.

The series' visuals have generally been praised, with the decision to use a muted color scheme garnering a particularly positive reception; Mauno Joukama writing for the Finnish magazine Anime in 2005 called it "picturesque" and Animerica in 2003 wrote that it was "stunning". Later reviews have been ambivalent regarding the anime's visual quality. Theron Martin, writing for Anime News Network in 2012, notes that while the animation quality was "fairly sharp" by early 2000s standards, it aged poorly with modern devices, causing certain artistic flaws to become more noticeable. In 2022, Kara Dennison of Otaku USA praised the aesthetics of the show, stating that "the show has all the beautiful aesthetic design we expect from Abe."

Stig Høgset, in his review for THEM Anime Reviews, hailed the series as "one of the finest animated works in existence", especially lauding the music as among "the most beautiful in any anime ever". Jonathan Mays of Anime News Network described the Hanenone soundtrack as an "emotional expedition", concluding it to be "superior to almost all television series music." A review on Web Anime Style praised Otani for integrating the theme of the anime into the soundtrack, pointing out that the theme of "death" is lurking behind the music in the form of continuo, while the warm yet taut resonance resembles the sound of prayer.

The English dub released by Pioneer Entertainment and produced by New Generation Pictures received generally favorable critique. Anime News Network's Zac Bertschy called it a "marvel", noting that it had managed to overcome his generally low expectations for English dubs. Theron Martin, writing for the network nine years later, described it as an "excellent effort", praising the natural-sounding dialogue. Ryan Mathews, on the other hand, found it merely "enjoyable", expressing his dislike for the cast of most supporting characters. The full-color comic adaption of the anime published by Dark Horse Comics was described as aesthetically pleasing with "particular attention to line work and detailed backgrounds."

The Encyclopedia of Science Fiction described Haibane Renmei as a good, philosophical anime, regarded by many as a classic, praising its intriguing setting, engaging characters and exploration of eschatology, particularly through the mysterious origins and eventual departures of its winged protagonists. It noted that much of the fictional world's nature and underlying mechanisms is deliberately left unexplained, an approach also found in creator Yoshitoshi Abe's earlier series NieA_7. The encyclopedia highlighted the ambiguity surrounding the Haibane's apparently angelic nature, observing that Abe explicitly denied that they worship any particular deity. It also identified elements of advanced technology within the seemingly fantastical setting and noted the series' partial influence from Haruki Murakami's novel Hard-Boiled Wonderland and the End of the World.
