= Yasuyuki Ueda =

Japanese producer

Yasuyuki Ueda (上田 耕行, Ueda Yasuyuki) is a Japanese producer, who has worked on such projects as Serial Experiments Lain (a producer and story writer). He was a director for the Noel video game, worked on the Lain video game, as well as on Wachenröder for the Sega Saturn. He first hired Yoshitoshi Abe, who would become a regular collaborator on many other anime projects.

== Anime involved in ==
- Phantom Quest Corp. (1994), Assistant Producer
- Hyper Doll (1995), Producer
- Magical Project S (1996), Assistant Producer
- Tenchi the Movie 2: The Daughter of Darkness (1997), Production Supporter
- Serial Experiments Lain (1998), Original Concept & Story, Producer
- Nazca (1998), Producer
- The Legend of Black Heaven (1999), Music Producer
- Amazing Nurse Nanako (1999), Producer
- NieA 7 (2000), Producer
- Hellsing (2001), Executive Producer
- Haibane Renmei (2002), Producer
- Texhnolyze (2003), Producer
- Koi Kaze (2004), Producer
- Ergo Proxy (2006), Music Producer
- Hellsing Ultimate (2006), Producer
- Shigurui: Death Frenzy (2007), Producer
- Rideback (2009), Producer
- Danganronpa: The Animation (2013), Executive producer
