= Tomokazu Tokoro =

Japanese animator and director

Tomokazu Tokoro (ところ ともかず, Tokoro Tomokazu) is a Japanese animator and director, best known for directing the anime series Haibane Renmei and Hellsing Ultimate.

He has also directed NieA_7, Maria†Holic Alive, and was assistant director on Macross Zero. He has worked on Serial Experiments Lain, Lupin III: $1 Money Wars (Missed by a Dollar), Lupin III: Walther P-38 (Island of Assassins), Armitage III (OVA), White Album, and Space Fantasia 2001 Nights.
