= Ryūtarō Nakamura =

Japanese director and animator

Ryūtarō Nakamura 中村 隆太郎
- Born: April 15, 1955
- Died: June 29, 2013 (aged 58)
- Occupations: Director, storyboard artist, key animator
- Writing career
- Language: Japanese
- Notable works: Serial Experiments Lain; Kino's Journey; Ghost Hound; Despera

Ryūtarō Nakamura (中村 隆太郎, Nakamura Ryūtarō; April 15, 1955 – June 29, 2013) was a Japanese director and animator, best known for directing the landmark anime series Serial Experiments Lain, and for his collaboration with Masamune Shirow and Chiaki J. Konaka on Ghost Hound.

== Death ==
In 2009, it was announced that he would be working on a new project: Despera. Production was put on hold due to Nakamura suffering from an unspecified illness. Following several months of hospitalization due to pancreatic cancer, he died on June 29, 2013. His death was announced nearly a month after.

== Filmography ==
=== Director ===
- 1992: Tomcat's Big Adventure: Director, Script, Storyboard, Composition
- 1994: The Life of Guskou Budori: Director, Script
- 1995: Legend of Crystania - The Motion Picture: Director
- 1996: Legend of Crystania (OVA): Director
- 1998: Serial Experiments Lain: Series director, Director (Eps 1, 2, 12, 13), Storyboard, Continuity (Eps 5, 6, 8, 11–13), Continuity Direction
- 1999: Colorful: Director, Storyboard, Episode Director (1-4,12,14,16)
- 2000: Sakura Wars: Series director, Continuity
- 2003: Kino's Journey: Director, Storyboard, Episode Director (ep 1, 2, 5)
- 2006: Rec: Director, Storyboard, Episode Director
- 2007: Kino's Journey -Country of Illness- For You-: Director
- 2007: Ghost Hound: Director
- 2013 (Posthumous): Jūgo Shōnen Hyōryūki Kaizokujima DE! Daibōken: Director
- Suspended: Despera: Director

=== Other ===
- 1978-79: Takarajima: Key Animation
- 1979-80: The Rose of Versailles: Key Animation (eps 24, 26–40)
- 1980-81: Ashita no Joe 2: Key Animation
- 1981: Unico (movie): Art
- 1982: Space Adventure Cobra - The Movie: Animation
- 1985: A Journey Through Fairyland (movie): In-Between Animation
- 1986: They Were Eleven (movie): Storyboard
- 1988: Patlabor The Mobile Police (OAV 1): Storyboard (eps 2, 4)
- 1990: The Great Adventures of Robin Hood: Storyboard (eps 14, 20, 25, 31, 33, 40, 47)
- 1991: Legend of Heavenly Sphere Shurato: Storyboard (2)
- 1991: Lupin III: "Steal Napoleon's Dictionary!": Storyboard
- 1991: Kikou Keisatsu Metal Jack: Storyboard (ep 30)
- 1991: Tenku Senki Shurato: Storyboard
- 1992: Tekkaman Blade: Storyboard (eps 12, 19, 25, 30)
- 1996: Popolocrois (game): Animation Movie Director, Story Board & Game Art
- 1999: Magic User's Club: Storyboard (ep 3), Episode Director (ep 3)
- 2000: Love Hina: Key Animation Episodes 13, 18
- 2001: Final Fantasy: Unlimited: Episode 2 Director/Storyboard
- 2002: Ghost in the Shell: Stand Alone Complex: Storyboard (ep 5), Episode Director (ep 5)

== Bibliography ==
- Legend of Crystania - The Motion Picture Storyboard (劇場アニメーション レジェンド・オブ・クリスタニア 絵コンテ). Triangle Staff.
- visual experiments lain (ビジュアルエクスペリメンツ レイン). Sony Magazines, 1999. ISBN 978-4789713429
