= Tricia Dickson =

American voice actress

- Born: January 3, 1982 (age 44); Reading, Pennsylvania, U.S.
- Other names: Samantha Tabak, Tricia A. Dickson, Tricha Dixon, Tricia Dixon, Wendy Tomson, Willow Lane, Tricia Dickson
- Occupation: Voice actress
- Years active: 1997–present
- Employer: New Generation Pictures
- Notable credit(s): NieA Under 7 as Mayuko Chigasaki

Samantha Tabak (born January 3, 1982), usually credited as Tricia Dickson, is an American voice actress. For a brief time, she was also a cast member of the Nickelodeon sketch comedy series, All That.

== Roles ==
=== Anime ===
- Angel Tales – Akane the Fox
- Girls Bravo – Lilica Stacy, Narration, Student C (ep. 2)
- Haibane Renmei – Haibane of Abandoned Factory
- Hellsing – Integra Hellsing (young)
- Ikki Tousen – Shimei Ryomou
- Melody of Oblivion – Toune Requiem
- NieA Under 7 – Mayuko Chigasaki
- Read or Die – Wendy Earhart
- R.O.D the TV – Nenene Sumiregawa
- Spirit of Wonder Scientific Boys Club – Windy
- Starship Girl Yamamoto Yohko II – Sylvie Dread
- I My Me! Strawberry Eggs – Ai Mikage

=== Other ===
- Disfigured (2008) – Cordelia
- Even Stevens (2002) – Lady Jane (Episode: The King Sloppy)
- Rave (2000) – Trace
- The Secret Kingdom (1998) – Callie Fremont
- All That (1997) – Player
