= Despera =

Japanese planned anime series

- Cover of light novel published by Tokuma Shoten on April 28, 2011

ですぺら (Desupera)
- Genre: Steampunk, Adventure, Science fiction
- Light novel
- Written by: Chiaki J. Konaka
- Illustrated by: Yoshitoshi Abe
- Published by: Tokuma Shoten
- Magazine: Animage
- Original run: July 2009 – July 2010
- Volumes: 1

Despera (ですぺら, Desupera) is a planned anime series, written by Chiaki J. Konaka and featuring character designs by Yoshitoshi Abe. It is Abe and Konaka's third collaboration, following Texhnolyze and Serial Experiments Lain. Ryūtarō Nakamura, who directed Serial Experiments Lain, was tapped to direct Despera but died before production could begin.

The title Despera is taken from a poem of the same title by Japanese Dadaist poet Jun Tsuji. Though the title of Tsuji's poem comes from the word "despair" or "desperation", the official blog for the anime stated that it can also imply the Spanish word desperado. A light novel serialization related to the anime was published in the Japanese magazine Animage from July 2009 to July 2010.

Despera is a spiritual successor/predecessor to Serial Experiments Lain sharing common themes and story elements, as well as connections between the series' respective main characters.

== Story ==
The story centers around Ain, a girl who builds devices despite her lack of scientific or engineering background. An alternate history science fiction story, set in Tokyo during the Taishō era spanning from 1922, to the 1923 Great Kantō earthquake. The final chapter prologue takes place in an unspecified year during the Shōwa era.

== Characters ==
- Ain (あいん, Ain) - A girl who resides in her workshop in the basement of the Ryōunkaku in Asakusa, Tokyo. A technical genius with no prior scientific knowledge, she is able to create electronic devices far beyond the capabilities of the current era. Some of the devices created include early versions of a modern computer, complete with typewriter keyboards and cathode ray tube display monitors. In the light novel, one of her ongoing works is a mysterious robot which she refers to as Father (お父さん, Otō-san). Despite her young appearance, she often displays the maturity of an adult. She is also shown to be capable of generating electricity from her hands when she takes on a tank squadron in the story.
- Takeshita (竹下, Takeshita) - A man appearing to be around 30 years old who is an associate of Ain's. In the light novel, he claims to be able to see the future through the displays on Ain's computer monitors. He sells this information in the form of prophecies to the Japanese military and the aristocracy to gather funds for Ain's inventions. In the serialized version, he has no name and is only referred to as "the man", and his face is unseen throughout the illustrations. He is described as rarely showing emotions, and only displays more care for Ain.
- Enoki (榎木, Enoki) - A military officer who works for the Japanese army's science institute. He holds the rank of second lieutenant. Enoki is sent to Asakusa to investigate the unstable electrical discharge occurring in the vicinity of the Ryōunkaku.
- Kimiyasu Fuenokōji (笛小路公寧, Fuenokōji Kimiyasu) - A Japanese nobleman with the title of viscount. He is interested in Ain's unorthodox inventions. He has a primary residence in Sanbanchō of Chiyoda-ku, and a second residence at the Kanda-Surugadai district.
- Barbara Andrei (バルバラ・アンドレイ, Barubara Andorei) - A Russian woman of aristocratic origins, Barbara is a refugee who escaped from Harbin after the disownment of Russians by the Chinese Republic. She lives in the Kanda-Surugadai residence owned by Kimiyasu, who has taken her in. Ain is particularly uncomfortable in Barbara's presence, as she is frightened of her pale white complexion, presumably having never seen a Russian before.

== Chapters ==
Thirteen chapters were released in serial form in the Animage magazine between July 2009 and July 2010. The complete novella was published as a single volume on April 28, 2011, and included new story content and illustrations.

1. "Prologue" (序章, "Joshō")
2. "The Girl Below the Twelve Storeys" (十二階下の少女, "Jūnikai shita no shōjo")
3. "The Russian Lady of the Mansion" (洋館の露西亜貴婦人, "Yōkan no roshia kifujin)
4. "Asakusa Tales" (浅草異譚, "Asakusa itan")
5. "Electric Girl Versus Tank Corps" (電気娘対戦車隊, "Denki musume tai sensha tai")
6. "From Beyond the Screen" (銀幕の彼方より, "Ginmaku no kanata yori")
7. "In the Corner of the Triangular Second Floor" (三角二階の片隅にて, "Sankaku nikai no katasumi nite")
8. "The Black Cat of the Twelve-Floor Skyscraper" (十二階天塔の黒猫, "Jūnikai tentō no kuro neko")
9. "Devil" (魔王, "Maō")
10. "Sky" (空, "Sora")
11. "Parting" (離別, "Ribetsu")
12. "The Nightmare Which Does Not Continue" (続かぬ悪夢, "Tsuduka nu akumu")
13. "Meeting" (邂逅, "Kaikō")

== Production ==
Despera light novel under serialization in Animage magazine.

Abe announced at Sakura-Con 2009 development of a new anime, revealing that it would be set during Japan's Taishō era. Ryūtarō Nakamura, who had directed Serial Experiments Lain, was tapped to direct. Beginning in July, a light novel serialization penned by Konaka and Abe ran in the Japanese magazine Animage, terminating a year later.

In 2010, production of the anime was placed on hold due to Nakamura's health. On June 29, 2013, Nakamura died of pancreatic cancer, and it was unknown whether development of Despera would continue following his death. At Overload 2014, Abe announced that the anime would move forward with a new director.

In 2018, Abe and Konaka acknowledged that Despera was in development hell, citing the state of the anime industry.

On March 23, 2021, Konaka said that the anime was 80% funded, and that both he and Abe had continued to work on it continually since its conception except for an interruption due to the COVID-19 pandemic.

On April 7, 2021, Konaka stated on an interview that the setting, characters, and story of Despera have completely changed. The extent of the changes remain unclear.

In 2025, Konaka said that the anime's production is set for 2027.

At the 2026 Japan Weekend Madrid event, Konaka announced a manga adaptation would be released in 2027.
