= Josh Phillips (actor) =

American voice actor

- Occupation: Voice actor

Josh Phillips is an American voice actor.

== Roles ==
- Angel Tales - Guy
- Haibane Renmei - Hyoko
- Hellsing - Jan Valentine
- Ikki Tousen - Genjo Kakoton
- I My Me Strawberry Eggs - Kyosuke Aoki / Yoshihiko Nishimada
- Melody of Oblivion - Kuron
- Mortal Kombat vs. DC Universe - Green Lantern
- NieA Under 7 - Genzo Somemiya
- Texhnolyze - Hal
