= Rec (manga) =

Japanese manga series

- First tankōbon volume cover
- Genre: Romantic comedy
- Manga
- Written by: Q-Tarō Hanamizawa
- Published by: Shogakukan
- Magazine: Monthly Sunday Gene-X
- Original run: November 19, 2002 – March 19, 2013
- Volumes: 16
- Anime television series
- Directed by: Ryūtarō Nakamura
- Produced by: Takumi Fujimori; Mitsuteru Shibata; Yoshihisa Nakayama; Shinichi Nakamura; Kozue Kaneniwa; Mitsutoshi Kubota
- Written by: Reiko Yoshida
- Music by: Kei Haneoka
- Studio: Shaft
- Original network: TBS, BS-i
- Original run: February 3, 2006 – March 31, 2006
- Episodes: 9 + OVA
- icon

Rec (stylized as REC) is a Japanese manga series by Q-Tarō Hanamizawa. It was serialized by Shogakukan's seinen manga magazine Monthly Sunday Gene-X from November 2002 to March 2013, with its chapters collected in sixteen tankōbon volumes. The story follows the relationship between Fumihiko Matsumaru, a salaryman, and Aka Onda, an aspiring voice actress. A nine-episode anime adaptation by Shaft aired between February and March 2006; an original video animation episode was also produced.

== Plot ==
Fumihiko Matsumaru waits outside a movie theater for a date who does not arrive. As he prepares to discard the unused tickets, a young woman approaches and, speaking as if she were the tickets themselves, asks him not to waste them. Intrigued, he watches the film, Roman Holiday, with her. During the screening, he observes her quietly reciting the subtitles aloud.

Afterward, the girl explains she was practicing the dialogue, expressing a desire to emulate Audrey Hepburn. She introduces herself as Aka Onda, a twenty-year-old aspiring voice actress. They discover they live in the same neighborhood and part ways. Later that night, a fire alarms Matsumaru, and he finds Aka's apartment destroyed. With no other shelter available, he offers her a place to stay, which she accepts.

Matsumaru soon learns his proposed mascot, "Nekoki" (ねこキ), has been approved for a snack product called "Ha". Coincidentally, Aka is hired to provide the character's voice. To avoid any appearance of impropriety at their shared workplace, they agree to keep their living arrangement secret. Aka clarifies that their cohabitation is strictly practical and does not imply a romantic relationship, despite a prior moment of intimacy. Their daily life together becomes a complex negotiation of professional boundaries and deepening personal connection.

== Characters ==
Fumihiko Matsumaru (松丸 文彦, Matsumaru Fumihiko)
Voiced by: Makoto Yasumura
A 26-year-old salaryman who works in a snack company's marketing department, where his advertising proposals are seldom approved. His sole successful project is the Nekoki (ネコキ) mascot for the Ha snack. He shares a romantic relationship with coworker, Aka Onda, though his occasional inappropriate behavior or attention toward other women frequently causes friction between them.
Aka Onda (恩田 赤, Onda Aka)
Voiced by: Kanako Sakai
A 20-year-old aspiring voice actress who admires Audrey Hepburn, often quoting lines from her films. She voices the Nekoki (ネコキ) mascot for the Ha snack. While she initially insists their relationship is platonic, she and Matsumaru develop romantic feelings and begin a discreet relationship.
Yoshioka (吉岡)
Voiced by: Megumi Toyoguchi
Aka's manager-in-charge. She is sleeping with the company's president. She accidentally gets into two compromising situations with Matsumaru, and he has to spend some time calming Aka down when she sees them.
Tanaka (田中)
Voiced by: Kimiko Koyama
She is a colleague Matsumaru had a crush on before he made Aka his girlfriend. It is later revealed that she likes to destroy men, and attempts to make Matsumaru think he slept with her, and tell Aka. Her plan fails when Aka keeps her faith in him.
Yoshio Hatakeda (畑田 良夫, Hatakeda Yoshio)
Voiced by: Daisuke Ono
Matsumaru's colleague, who is a fan of Aka.
Hideyoshi Sekigahara (関ヶ原 秀吉, Sekigahara Hideyoshi)
An eccentric movie director who recruits Aka for his newest movie, takes her to Hokkaido, which prompts Matsumaru to pursue her. It is revealed that he had no intentions aside from writing a new script, and helps to strengthen Aka's and Matsumaru's relationship.
Kazushi Kubo (久保 一志, Kubo Kazushi)
A popular actor nicknamed "Kushi" who lives next door to Matsumaru and Aka. He harbors romantic feelings for Aka, having known her since middle school. He befriends Matsumaru and deduces their secret romantic relationship. Although he orchestrates a situation intending to act on his feelings, he ultimately respects their bond and withdraws, pledging his continued friendship.
Takagawara (高河原, Takagawara)
Aka's previous manager who tried to control her personal life to maximize her popularity.
Ao Onda (音田 青, Onda Ao)
A talented animator and Aka's younger sister. She initially harbors resentment towards her sister, which she extends to Aka's relationship with her coworker, Matsumaru. Ao makes several attempts to flirt with Matsumaru and create misunderstandings between the couple. After a period of reflection, she resolves her childhood grievances with Aka and abandons her romantic interest in Matsumaru, instead viewing him with a familial affection.
Maki Koiwai (小岩井 まき, Koiwai Maki)
A voice actor who is a friend of Aka's. She is a huge fan of Kushi.
Akari Yukiji (雪路 明理, Yukiji Akari)
Aka's other voice actor friend, she is best friends with Maki, and they are often seen together. She has to pretend to be Matsumaru's girlfriend when Kushi comes to their house.

== Media ==
=== Manga ===
Written and illustrated by Q-Tarō Hanamizawa, Rec was serialized in Shogakukan's seinen manga magazine Monthly Sunday Gene-X from November 19, 2002, to March 19, 2013. Shogakukan collected its chapters in sixteen tankōbon volumes, released from September 19, 2003, to June 19, 2013.

=== Anime ===
An anime adaptation containing nine twelve-minute episodes was animated by Shaft and aired in Japan between February 3 and March 31, 2006; a single original video animation episode was also produced. The anime's opening theme is "Cheer! (Makka na Kimochi)" (Cheer!～まっかなキモチ～) performed by Kanako Sakai, written by Hiiro Misaki, and composed and arranged by Kōhei Koyama. The anime's ending theme is "Devotion" performed by BRACE;d, and written, composed, and arranged by a.k.a.dRESS (ave;new).

The series was directed by Ryūtarō Nakamura and written by Reiko Yoshida and features music by Kei Haneoka. Hideyuki Morioka designed the characters and served as chief animation director. Four of the episodes were outsourced outside of Shaft: episode 2 to Daume; and episodes 3, 5, and 7 to Studio Pastoral. (Note: Outsourcing studios credited as Production Assistance (制作協力) on their respective episodes.)

==== Episodes ====
All episodes were written by Reiko Yoshida and storyboarded by Ryūtarō Nakamura.

No.	Title	Directed by (Note: Information is taken from the ending credits of each episode.)	Animation director	Original release date
1	"Roman Holiday"; Transliteration: "Rōma no Kyōjitsu" (Japanese: ローマの休日)	Ryūtarō Nakamura	Hideyuki Morioka	February 3, 2006
Fumihiko Matsumaru anxiously awaits his date, Tanaka, in front of the movie theater. When Tanaka is late, he crumples the movie tickets and prepares to throw them away, only to "hear" the tickets telling him not to do so; in actuality, it's a nearby girl who's dubbing the voice of the tickets. He gives the tickets to her, and they watch the movie together. Inside, she reads the subtitles of the movie out loud and Fumihiko concludes that she is just weird. Leaving the theater, Fumihiko sees Tanaka with another man and thus saddened is accompanied by the subtitle-reading girl for yakitori and beer. As the two head home, Fumihiko finds out that the girl lives almost next door. In the middle of the night, he wakes to see the girl's apartment has burnt down and convinces her to stay in his house. As she becomes distraught over her horrible luck, they kiss. The girl introduces herself as Aka Onda, before they make love and fall asleep.
2	"Sabrina Fair"; Transliteration: "Uruwashi no Saburina" (Japanese: 麗しのサブリナ)	Ryūtarō Nakamura	Makoto Sawazaki	February 10, 2006
The next day, Fumihiko learns at work that his marketing concept "Nekoki" (a cat-tree) has been approved as the mascot of a snack product called Ha; and that Aka is chosen to voice Nekoki. They decide to keep their live-in relationship a secret from their employers due to Aka's worries about an appearance of impropriety. She also insists they are not a couple just because they had slept together once in a moment of weakness, and that she will merely be lodging with him. The series is heavily concerned with the developing dynamic of their relationship.
3	"Wait Until Dark"; Transliteration: "Kurakunaru made Matte" (Japanese: 暗くなるまで待って)	Yasuo Ejima	Hiroki Yamamura	February 17, 2006
The episode deals with Fumihiko realizing that he has let a total stranger into his house. It also has two flashbacks to when Aka and Fumihiko had each been in high school. Aka's flashback has her friend commenting on how great it would be to hear Aka's voice on TV. Fumihiko's flashback has his friend tell him that Tokyo girls are easy, a comment that he refutes after he is once again struck by Aka for trying to kiss her.
4	"Breakfast at Tiffany's"; Transliteration: "Tīfanī de Chōshoku o" (Japanese: ティファニーで朝食を)	Ryūtarō Nakamura	Yoshiaki Itou	February 24, 2006
After a shaky start when Fumihiko walks in on Aka on the toilet, the two of them go and launch their advertising campaign. It starts badly, but after a little girl recognizes Nekoki, their spirits are lifted. Afterwards, Aka cries with happiness at her voice being recognized.
5	"Love in the Afternoon"; Transliteration: "Hirusagari no Jōji" (Japanese: 昼下がりの情事)	Yasuo Ejima	Keita Shimizu	March 3, 2006
Aka is having trouble with her current job because she is voice-acting in an H-game. She struggles with the words and eventually asks Fumihiko for help. He initially misunderstands but realizes her innocent intentions before he does anything stupid. After successfully completing her job, Fumihiko buys the game, but Aka confiscates it and prohibits him from playing it.
6	"The Children's Hour"; Transliteration: "Uwasa no Futari" (Japanese: 噂の二人)	Ryūtarō Nakamura	Kousuke Murayama	March 10, 2006
After an incident involving underwear on live television, both Aka's and Fumihiko's careers take a boost. This causes friction, culminating in Aka saying that once she earns enough money, she will leave- causing both of them to get depressed. Aka's depression affects her performance on one of her jobs, but she manages to get the lines right after remembering her feelings whenever Fumihiko came home. The episode ends with Aka crying alone and wondering if she can return to Fumihiko.
7	"War and Peace"; Transliteration: "Sensō to Heiwa" (Japanese: 戦争と平和)	Yasuo Ejima	Hiroki Yamamura; Keita Shimizu; Yoshitsugu Hatano	March 17, 2006
In this episode the campaign staff take a company trip to the hot springs. Aka and Fukihiko independently enter the same springs seeking solitude and find each other naked, much to their dismay. Later, Aka's manager sensing Aka's feelings confronts Fukihiko.
7.5	"The Unforgiven"; Transliteration: "Yurusarezaru Mono" (Japanese: 許されざる者)	Ryūtarō Nakamura	Hideyuki Morioka	June 30, 2006
Fumihiko and Aka go out to eat and come across Tanaka, who had just been dumped by her boyfriend. She pressures him to drink with her for the night and Aka becomes jealous. When Tanaka is drunk, Fumihiko takes her home, much to Aka's dismay and suspicion. The next day, Tanaka tells Aka that nothing happened.
8	"My Fair Lady"; Transliteration: "Mai Fea Redī" (Japanese: マイ·フェア·レディ)	Ryūtarō Nakamura	Yoshiaki Itou	March 24, 2006
As Aka's career takes off, she unintentionally misses a date with Fumihiko. Fumihiko's day had gone from bad to worse at work, feels foolish being stood up and is soaked in a storm. When he finally sees her late that night in his apartment, his frustrations get the better of him and he says some unwarranted things.
9	"Two for the Road"; Transliteration: "Itsumo Futari de" (Japanese: いつも2人で)	Ryūtarō Nakamura	Hideyuki Morioka; Yoshiaki Itou	March 31, 2006
Feeling sorry about what he had said to her before, Fumihiko tries to think of a way to apologize to Aka but instead pushes her away even more, thinking he is not worthy of her since she has become popular. That day, his colleague Hatakeda takes him out for a night of drinking to cheer him up, and they end up in the room right next to that of Aka and the staff of the new anime series she is voicing. They express their feelings to each other and finally become a couple.

=== Visual novel ===
Idea Factory released a visual novel adaptation, titled Rec: Doki Doki Seiyū Paradise, on November 30, 2006, in limited and regular editions; the limited edition included a bonus CD, a small art book, and different cover artwork. The player assumes the role of Fumihiko Matsumaru who is the director for a new television project. The goal is to choose who will be the main voice actress for the project, create new relationships, complete advertising campaigns among other things. In addition to the standard romance element where the player can choose between dating Momiji Endō and Aka Onda, there is also a "multi-seiyū system" where the player chooses between the potential voice actresses to play the voice in an anime. There are also web radio, photo shoots, and Akihabara events in which the voice actresses participate. Rec: Doki Doki Seiyū Paradise received a combined score of 24/40—from a score of 6/10 from each of the four reviewers—from the Japanese video game magazine Famitsu.
