= Eri Miyajima =

Japanese voice actress (born 1974)

Eri Miyajima (宮島 依里, Miyajima Eri; born February 3, 1974) is a Japanese voice actress from Tokyo, Japan. She voices Guren in Naruto: Shippuden and Kana in Haibane Renmei.

== Filmography ==
=== Anime television ===
- Kero Kero Chime (1997), Pika Pika
- Popolocrois Monogatari (1998), Hyuu
- The Big O (1999)
- Wild Arms: Twilight Venom (1999), Sybil
- ATASHIn'CHI (2002), Fukuzawa
- Haibane Renmei (2002), Kana
- Kaleido Star (2003), Alice
- Mushi-Shi (2005), Mio (ep 22)
- Naruto Shippūden (2007), Guren
- Kaze no Stigma (2007), Mayumi Tsuwabuki (eps 9–12)
- Durarara!! (2010), Yōko
- High School of the Dead (2010), News Reporter (eps 2–3)
- Yu-Gi-Oh! Zexal (2011), Mirai Tsukumo
- One Piece (2025), Alpha

=== Original video animations ===
- Sol Bianca: The Legacy (1999), June Ashel

=== Video games ===
- Lost Judgment: The Kaito Files (2022), Mikiko Sadamoto

=== Dubbing ===
==== Live-action ====
- Jessica Alba
  - Fantastic Four (Susan Storm / Invisible Woman)
  - Fantastic Four: Rise of the Silver Surfer (Susan Storm / Invisible Woman)
  - Spy Kids: All the Time in the World (Marissa Wilson)
  - Some Kind of Beautiful (Kate)
  - The Veil (Maggie Price)
- 28 Days Later (Hannah (Megan Burns))
- 28 Weeks Later (Major Scarlet Levy (Rose Byrne))
- 28 Years Later (Isla (Jodie Comer))
- 500 Days of Summer (Summer Finn (Zooey Deschanel))
- Absentia (Alice Durand (Cara Theobold))
- Afraid (Meredith (Katherine Waterston))
- American Made (Lucy Seal (Sarah Wright))
- Army of the Dead (Maria Cruz (Ana de la Reguera))
- Army of Thieves (Maria Cruz (Ana de la Reguera))
- Bangkok Dangerous (Aom (Panward Hemmanee))
- Bella Martha (Lea (Katja Studt))
- Bring It On: All or Nothing (Britney Allen (Hayden Panettiere))
- Broadchurch (Claire Ripley (Eve Myles))
- Bullet to the Head (Lisa Bonomo (Sarah Shahi))
- Casper (2004 DVD edition) (Kathleen "Kat" Harvey (Christina Ricci))
- Chicago Med (Dr. Natalie Manning (Torrey DeVitto))
- Coffee Prince (Han Yoo-joo (Chae Jung-an))
- Cold Comes the Night (Chloe (Alice Eve))
- The Curse of La Llorona (Anna Tate-Garcia (Linda Cardellini))
- Dark Phoenix (Elaine Grey (Hannah Anderson))
- Designated Survivor (First Lady Alex Kirkman (Natascha McElhone))
- Elysium (Frey Santiago (Alice Braga))
- Fires (Lally Robinson (Anna Torv))
- First Daughter (Samantha MacKenzie (Katie Holmes))
- Four Christmases (Kate (Reese Witherspoon))
- Fringe (Olivia Dunham (Anna Torv))
- Gentlemen Broncos (Tabatha Jenkins (Halley Feiffer))
- Get Smart's Bruce and Lloyd: Out of Control (Isabella (Marika Domińczyk))
- Good People (Anna Wright (Kate Hudson))
- Guardians of the Galaxy (Meredith Quill (Laura Haddock))
- Guardians of the Galaxy Vol. 2 (Meredith Quill (Laura Haddock))
- Houdini (Bess Houdini (Kristen Connolly))
- I See You (Jackie Harper (Helen Hunt))
- I'll Always Know What You Did Last Summer (Amber Williams (Brooke Nevin))
- Infestation (Sara (Brooke Nevin))
- The Invisible (Annelie "Annie" Newton (Margarita Levieva))
- Kung Fu Yoga (Ashmita (Disha Patani))
- Lost Girl (Bo Dennis (Anna Silk))
- Miss March (Cindi Whitehall (Raquel Alessi))
- Mr. Mercedes (Deborah Hartsfield (Kelly Lynch))
- Paranormal Activity 3 (Julie (Lauren Bittner))
- Peninsula (Min-jung (Lee Jung-hyun))
- Poseidon (Jennifer Ramsey (Emmy Rossum))
- School of Rock (Lawrence "Mr. Cool" (Robert Tsai))
- The Search (Carole (Bérénice Bejo))
- Shazam! (Eugene Choi (Ian Chen))
- Shutter Island (Dolores Chanal (Michelle Williams))
- Source Code (Christina Warren (Michelle Monaghan))
- Sunshine (Cassie (Rose Byrne))
- Timeline (Kate Ericson (Frances O'Connor))
- Walk the Line (June Carter (Reese Witherspoon))
- Wild (Cheryl Strayed (Reese Witherspoon))

==== Animation ====
- Atlantis: Milo's Return (Audrey)
- DC League of Super-Pets (Wonder Woman)
- Delgo (Princess Kyla)
- Hello Kitty's Furry Tale Theater (Tuxedo Sam)
