= Serial Experiments Lain (video game) =

1998 video game

- Developer: Pioneer LDC
- Publisher: Pioneer LDC
- Designers: Chiaki J. Konaka; Ueda Yasuyuki
- Platform: PlayStation
- Release: JP: November 26, 1998
- Genres: Simulation, Interactive fiction
- Mode: Single player

The Serial Experiments Lain video game, based on the anime of the same name, was released for PlayStation exclusively in Japan on November 26, 1998, by Pioneer LDC. It is largely dialogue-centric, differing from traditional video game gameplay structures. Throughout the game, the player, in the role of a therapist, unlocks pieces of information and multimedia with the assistance of the source material's protagonist, Lain Iwakura, to explore her mental state. This material includes Lain's therapy sessions, her diary, notes from her therapist, and video segments. The game shares the themes and protagonist, but not the plot, of the original anime series.

== Gameplay ==
The game was designed as a "network simulator" which the player would navigate to explore Lain's journey between real life and online life. The creators themselves did not describe it as a game but as "Psycho-Stretch-Ware", incorporating visual novel and non-linear multimedia elements; the gameplay is limited to unlocking pieces of information and then reading/viewing/listening to them, with little or no puzzle needed to unlock. Lain distances itself even more from classical games by the random order in which information is collected. The aim of the authors was to let the player get the feeling that there are myriads of information that they would have to sort through and that they would have to do with less than what exists to understand. As with the anime, the creative team's main goal was to let the player "feel" Lain, "to understand her problems, and to love her".

== Plot ==
Lain Iwakura is a quiet, withdrawn girl who has begun experiencing auditory and visual hallucinations, as well as recurring nightmares. Her parents arrange for her to see psychiatrist Toko Yonera, who works at Tachibaba, a research center dedicated to mental disorders and the psychology of communication. Lain is the first patient in Toko's career; while Toko genuinely strives to help her, she is simultaneously under immense stress due to a heavy workload of routine tasks and difficulties in her personal life.

Toko tentatively diagnoses Lain with a delusional disorder, yet she maintains the belief that Lain is fundamentally sound and that the true source of her psychological trauma lies in her nightmares. The therapy sessions yield some positive results, and Lain begins to return to a semblance of normal life. However, she soon becomes the target of bullying by her friend Kyoko and the entire class after catching the eye of a boy whom Kyoko had a crush on. Lain drops out of school and begins to intensively study computer programming and psychiatry using a computer gifted to her by her father. Later, she enrolls in a new middle school, where she befriends a girl named Misato. Lain gets along well with her, and her psychological condition improves. However, Misato is soon accused of plagiarizing a painting submitted to a competition and subsequently vanishes without a trace. Lain is left alone, and with the start of the new school year, she once again finds herself in the same class as Kyoko, a situation that causes her condition to relapse. She drops out of school again and isolates herself at home, avidly studying programming and psychiatry. This leads to her parents quarreling and divorcing; her father leaves, while her mother begins to abuse alcohol.

Toko interviews Lain's friends, who claim they know no one named Misato and that no bullying of Lain ever took place. After discussing this with Lain, Toko concludes that Misato was an imaginary friend and that Lain likely suffers from paranoid schizophrenia. Meanwhile, Toko discovers that her boyfriend has married another woman without saying a word to her. Overcome with despair, she struggles to pull herself together and finds a new lover, Yoshida; however, her love is once again unrequited, as he had merely used her to test a new medical device before abandoning her, and her mental health deteriorates.

Lain hacks into Tachibana's servers, gaining access to Toko's diary and the reports written about herself, while simultaneously acquiring extensive knowledge of psychiatry. Consequently, the roles of Toko and Lain are reversed: Lain appears to counsel the psychologically broken Toko. She hypnotizes Toko, causing the latter to record descriptions of her own condition in the medical files where she is supposed to be documenting Lain's state. Missing her late father, Lain decides to recreate him as a program; she reconstructs his voice and speech patterns using a non-proprietary AI conversational engine, then equips him with image recognition capabilities and releases him onto the Wired to allow him to evolve. Next, she decides to build her father a body, constructing a torso, arms, and a head for him. The structure takes up too much space, necessitating its relocation to an abandoned factory, where Lain also sets up a workshop. Her mother abandons her, leaving their home.

Ultimately, Lain realizes that a person exists so long as they possess memory and consciousness; the physical body is of secondary importance. Much in the same way she recreated her father, she creates a digital copy of herself within the Wired and fosters its development. She destroys her father's physical body, drives Toko to commit suicide, and then goes to a bridge, draws a pistol, and shoots herself in order to merge with her digital self from the Wired.

== Reception and legacy ==
Reception

Review score
Publication	Score
Dengeki PlayStation	70/100, 55/100

Unlike the anime, the game drew little attention from the public following its initial release. While praised for its visuals, it was criticized for its lack of gameplay, interface, interminable dialogues, absence of music, and long loading times. In 2008, an English fan translation project of the game's script began, eventually being released as a PDF in 2014. By 2021, a renewed wave of interest in the game had formed, coinciding with the release of lainTSX, an unofficial web browser-based port of the English version of the game, utilizing webGL. A review of the browser version for The Michigan Daily described it as "raw and realistic in how it showcases mental health, but also overflowing with empathy for the matter, something a lot of representation misses." In 2026, a decompilation of the game was released, reconstructing its source code in C that rebuilds a byte-identical copy of the original executable, along with a native client for Windows, macOS and Linux that runs the game without an emulator using data from the player's own discs. The game has been cited as a precursor to later titles such as Her Story and What Remains of Edith Finch. By 2024, the game's value had risen to an extent that an unused, sealed copy of the game was valued at around US$3400.

It received a 3/5 rating in a 2023 review from Grimoire of Horror, which commented that players used to more traditional, linear forms of gameplay may prefer to experience the narrative by watching videos of the game due to its unconventional structure, also noting that compared to the anime it focused more on "alienation and how we crave human interaction".
