= Ghost Hound =

Anime and manga series

- Title screen of Ghost Hound

神霊狩/GHOST HOUND (Shinreigari/Gōsuto Haundo)
- Genre: Supernatural, suspense
- Created by: Production I.G; Masamune Shirow
- Anime television series
- Directed by: Ryūtarō Nakamura
- Produced by: Tetsuya Kinoshita; Daisuke Katagiri; Katsuji Morishita; Fuminori Yamazaki; Masahiro Yonezawa
- Written by: Chiaki J. Konaka
- Music by: TENG
- Studio: Production I.G
- Licensed by: AUS: Siren Visual; NA: Sentai Filmworks
- Original network: WOWOW
- Original run: October 18, 2007 – April 3, 2008
- Episodes: 22
- Manga

Shinreigari Another Side
- Written by: Masamune Shirow
- Illustrated by: Kanata Asahi
- Published by: Mag Garden
- Magazine: Comic Blade
- Original run: 2007 – 2008
- Volumes: 2

Ghost Hound (神霊狩/GHOST HOUND, Shinreigari/Gōsuto Haundo) is an anime television series, created by Production I.G and Masamune Shirow, renowned as being the creator of the Ghost in the Shell franchise. The original concept and design was first developed by Shirow in 1987. It is Production I.G's 20th anniversary project and was first announced at the 2007 Tokyo International Anime Fair.

The series is staffed by director Ryūtarō Nakamura, screenwriter Chiaki J. Konaka, character designer and chief animation director Mariko Oka, and art director Hiromasa Ogura. It premiered on Thursday, October 18, 2007, in Japan on WOWOW at 23:30 JST. A manga adaptation, featuring art by Kanata Asahi, has been serialized in Comic Blade.

== Storyline and setting ==
In the small town of Suiten, located in a remote mountain region on the island of Kyūshū, reality and the spirit realm collide. Ghosts and paranormal occurrences appear in the real world, spreading through the town. Three junior high school boys, Tarō, Makoto and Masayuki, who have all had traumatic experiences in their childhood, observe the strange occurrences happening at Suiten. Together, they investigate by entering the spirit realm, or the Unseen World, although no human is supposed to be able to do so. The three boys are granted entrance, only to realize the key to their childhood traumas lies within this Unseen World. The local Shinto priest and his daughter, Miyako, also become involved in the occurrences.

== Characters ==
The four main characters of Ghost Hound, from Left to Right: Miyako, Makoto, Masayuki, and above them all, Taro

Tarō Komori (古森 太郎, Komori Tarō)
Voiced by: Kenshō Ono (Japanese); Clint Bickham (English)
A narcoleptic 14-year-old boy is the main protagonist. Tarō and his older sister, Mizuka, were kidnapped 11 years ago, on September 22, 1996. Only Tarō survived the incident. Since then, he has had recurring nightmares and vivid out-of-body experiences (OBEs). Tarō records these visions to try to make sense of it all. He seeks help from a psychiatrist to help him sort through the details and deal with the fallout of his childhood trauma. Tarō can not remember the face of his kidnapper and has flashbacks containing a black giant taking his sister away. Once in the Unseen world, Tarō hopes to meet his sister so that he can clarify the past and come to terms with her death. Tarō seems to have romantic feelings for Miyako. In the later episodes, he begins to believe that Miyako is the reincarnation of his dead sister, Mizuka. As a result, he thinks that to be the cause of his feelings for Miyako. However, that is later subverted as Tarō admits that Miyako is Miyako, and no one else, after all.
Makoto Ōgami (大神 信, Ōgami Makoto)
Voiced by: Sōichirō Hoshi (Japanese); Josh Grelle (English)
A brooding, hot-tempered delinquent who avoids contact with his classmates, and rarely comes to school. A relative of Tarō's, his family is a branch of the Komori's. Makoto experiences O.B.Es like Tarō and Masayuki, and is able to bring the experience on while playing his guitar, a regular pastime of his. Makoto's family founded a religion of which his elderly grandmother, Himeko, currently serves as the central point. Himeko wishes that Makoto succeed her as its head, though Makoto is not interested. In the direct aftermath of the kidnapping of the Komori children, his grandmother told the police where to find them; his father killed himself in bizarre and unknown circumstances shortly after they were found. Makoto subsequently discovered his father's bloodied corpse, which traumatizes him. He subsequently wishes to find out more about the circumstances of his father's death, andinitially harbored resentment towards Tarō; however, he appears to have warmed up to him, upon gradually knowing him better and gathering more information about the circumstances relating to the kidnapping. He has, in the course of his out of body experiences, learned how to transform his spirit into the form of a wolf-like hound. He later meets his mother, who has remarried. He is shown to be angry towards her for having left him, even thinking of wanting to stab her, though fails to do so, running away from his mother's house in the process. He later learns of his mother's deep depression and her suicide attempt by overdosing on pills and even setting fire to her house, though later it is assumed that the Ogami religious group might have been responsible for the arson. After learning this he runs off in its direction, saving her from the debris of the house's burning remains. In the immediate aftermath, his mother briefly loses her memories and reverts to her seventeen-year-old self, but soon regains them later on. In episode nineteen, he finally called his mother, "Mom" instead of addressing her as "that woman". In this scene, both him and his mother cried as an indication that they really love and forgive each other. It is then revealed that he damaged his head not because of his mother but because of the kidnapper that kidnapped him before Taro and his sister.
Masayuki Nakajima (中嶋 匡幸, Nakajima Masayuki)
Voiced by: Jun Fukuyama (Japanese); Corey Hartzog (English)
Recently transferred to Tarō and Makoto's school from Tokyo, he tries to make friends with both due to an interest in investigating the kidnapping incident. While he was initially ignored by both, they eventually warmed up to him, with the three of them beginning to try to find the circumstances behind the kidnapping incident and the reason behind their O.B.Es. He tends to be very confident, and initially somewhat arrogant and rude. He has had a fear of heights ever since he bullied someone to suicide by jumping off the school roof, and the victim left a message on the blackboard cursing Masayuki, along with the other students who participated in the bullying. Masayuki unashamedly admits he ran away due to the message, unlike his classmates who appear completely unaffected by the message implicating all of them in the death. Instead of feeling guilt he is angry at the student for making him a murderer, a fact he can't get out of his conscience. He is, however, very determined to overcome this problem and tries extensively, including standing on the edge of the school roof, to cure his fear of heights. During his spare time, he often plays his head-mounted display virtual reality game. His father is a researcher at Japan Bio-Tech, while his mother appears to spend large amounts of time playing console games, primarily Tetris or something similar. Of the two other boys, Masayuki has a friendlier relationship with Tarō, visiting him in hospital and joking with him. Recently, during a joint experience of O.B.E. with Makoto and Taro, Masayuki displayed the ability to evoke the same weaponry from his virtual reality video game in his spirit form, and used it to apparently destroy the spirit of Taro's former kidnapper. After the incident, he begins to have a little more confidence, finally deciding to intervene in the bullying of one of his classmates. He is always the one who is spying on Reika because he found out about her relationship with his father.
Miyako Komagusu (駒玖珠 都, Komagusu Miyako)
Voiced by: Akiko Yajima (Japanese); Brittney Karbowski (English)
A mysterious young girl with the ability to see ghosts. She is somehow able to see Tarō's spirit during his O.B.E., as well as having been able to sense when all three boys entered the Unseen World for the first time. She lives at a shrine, which seems to have a lot of paranormal activity surrounding it, and regularly helps her father with exorcisms and the like. She acts rather mature for her age, often chiding the older boys for acting childish, and even scolding her father when he attempts to drink too much. She is shown later to have been possessed by spirits, resulting in her classmates trying to avoid her. When Taro told her that she might be the reincarnation of his sister, she is hurt by his words so much that she even starts to cry and says that she hates him because she has been convincing herself that, "I am me and not anybody else" and that Taro saw her as Mizuka not as Miyako. After this, she seems to be ignoring Taro, as if she has never known him. After her father is hospitalized, she is manipulated by the Ōgami group into becoming their new matriarch. However, the efforts of Taro and his friends prevent this.
Takahito Komagusu (駒玖珠 孝仁, Komagusu Takahito)
Voiced by: Yasunori Matsumoto (Japanese); Christopher Ayres (English)
Miyako's father and head of the shrine they live at. He has lectured as an assistant lecturer at a university of Tokyo, where Reika Ōtori was a student of his. He is worried about Miyako's long-term psychological health and has spoken to both Ōtori and Hirata about her. He was one of the group of teenagers who initially visited the abandoned hospital after the construction of the dam. He is later pushed off the steps of the Komagusu shrine, and becomes hospitalized.
Ryōya Komori (古森 良弥, Komori Ryōya)
Voiced by: Fumihiko Tachiki (Japanese); Justin Doran (English)
Tarō's father, and a famous sake brewer. He seems to have handled the incident much better than his wife. He has concerns about a nearby plant, which he knows will damage his business due to the waste it pumps into the river since clean water is needed for making sake.
Miki Komori (古森 美樹, Komori Miki)
Voiced by: Sakiko Tamagawa (Japanese); Kara Greenberg (English)
Tarō's mother. Although her daughter Mizuka died eleven years ago, she is still very emotionally damaged by the incident, and tends to show this with an unintended eye-twitch whenever Mizuka is mentioned. She also has admitted to taking medication, possibly to help her sleep, and also apparently cannot dream due to this medicine.
Atsushi Hirata (平田 篤司, Hirata Atsushi)
Voiced by: Yoshinori Fujita (Japanese); Jay Hickman (English)
Tarō's new counselor and therapist. An eccentric clinical psychologist from a university of Tokyo, he introduces much of the series' psychological terminology, and is apparently interested in Tarō's dreams and condition as a means supporting his own theories. Initially he does not believe Tarō's O.B.Es. are in any way supernatural and attributes these moments as states of altered consciousness. He later begins to admit that there may be a supernatural component, and that the land around the mountain in question may be the trigger of these events. He has also experienced supernatural events during the series, but prefers to keep them private, as they fit the diagnostics for certain psychological alterations.
Masato Kaibara (貝原直人, Kaibara Masato)
Voiced by: Shō Hayami (Japanese); Illich Guardiola (English)
Makoto's mother's husband. He is the person shown to be wandering through Kakuriyo under the identity of Snark and meets with Tarō. He appears to have apparently died while Makoto's mother attempted to commit suicide.
Kei Yakushi (瘧師 慧, Yakushi Kei)
Voiced by: Mitsuki Saiga (Japanese); Shelley Calene-Black (English)
A friend of the Komori family who also helps manage their sake business. She had a crush on Kaibara.
Yasuhiro Nakajima (中嶋 康弘, Nakajima Yasuhiro)
Voiced by: Tōru Ōkawa (Japanese); Andrew Love (English)
Masayuki's father, who works at Japan Bio-Tech. He is shown to be having an affair with Reika Ōtori.
Reika Ōtori (鳳 麗華, Ōtori Reika)
Voiced by: Michiko Neya (Japanese); Kaytha Coker (English)
A neurologist who treats Tarō and regularly prescribes medicine to his mother. She works in the labs at Japan Bio-Tech and part time as a doctor, and is the series's other source of psychological and neurological information.
Michio Hoshino (星野 道男, Hoshino Michio)
Voiced by: Shintarō Asanuma (Japanese); Blake Shepard (English)
Masayuki's and Makoto's classmate that was being bullied until Masayuki stood up for him. He and Masayuki have since become good friends, with Masayuki telling him about his O.B.Es, which Michio soon experiences for himself. He has been shown as able to read the Kojiki.
Himeko Ōgami (大神 姫子, Ōgami Himeko)
Voiced by: Ikuko Tani (Japanese); Monica Rial (English)
Makoto's elderly grandmother and head of the religion started by the Ōgami family. During the kidnapping incident, she had suggested searching for the children in the dried up dam. After the incident, her son, Makoto's father, whom she had wanted to succeed her as the religion's leader, committed suicide. Himeko later adamantly refuses to acknowledge anything whatsoever concerning it, and forbids Makoto from entering his father's former room. She also wishes that Makoto take over the reins of the family's religion, however Makoto has shown no interest in it. She also appears to be ill, regularly administering medicine, and dies later onwards.
Motoi Yazaki (矢崎 基, Yazaki Motoi)
Voiced by: Jin Urayama (Japanese); John Swasey (English)
A politician, who appears to be corrupt. He was friends with Makoto's parents and Takahito Komagusu, while they were students in high school, and had entered the abandoned hospital with them. Makoto tries to ask him about his father, but he is shown to be shocked upon knowing his identity, refusing to answer any of his questions.
Mizuka Komori (古森 水塚, Komori Mizuka)
Voiced by: Kaori Shimizu (Japanese); Serena Varghese (English)
Taro's older sister who was killed before the beginning of the series. When the siblings were quite young, she along with her brother were kidnapped by an unknown person. Unlike her brother, she did not survive.

== Media ==
=== Anime ===
Sentai Filmworks currently licenses the anime in North America and is localized & distributed by Section23 Films. The first half of the season was released on October 20, 2009. The second half was released on December 15, 2009. Sentai Filmworks re-released Ghost Hound with an English dub on DVD and Blu-ray on September 14, 2010.

The Anime Network started showing the series October 29, 2009, and put the first episode online.

The anime's opening theme song is "Poltergeist" (ポルターガイスト) arranged by Mayumi Kojima and Isao Tsukamoto with lyrics, composition and performance by Mayumi Kojima. The ending theme song is "Call My Name ~Kazenari no Oka~" (Call My Name ～風鳴りの丘～) performed by Yucca, composed by Ai Kamachi with arrangement by aikamichi and nagie, and lyrics by Kyoko Fujii.

=== Anime streaming and availability ===
The series is listed on major digital platforms such as Apple TV (streaming service), and it shows both English and Japanese audio options. It is also available for purchase or rental on Google TV (service) (region dependent) and on Amazon Prime Video.

=== Manga ===
The manga series Shinreigari: Another Side was written by Masamune Shirow with art by Kanata Asahi. The manga has two volumes and was published from Mar 30, 2007 in the monthly magazine Comic Blade.

=== Video games ===
A game based on Ghost Hound by 5pb. was released on July 31, 2008, for the Nintendo DS.
