= Yoshitoshi Abe =

Japanese graphic artist

- 安倍 吉俊
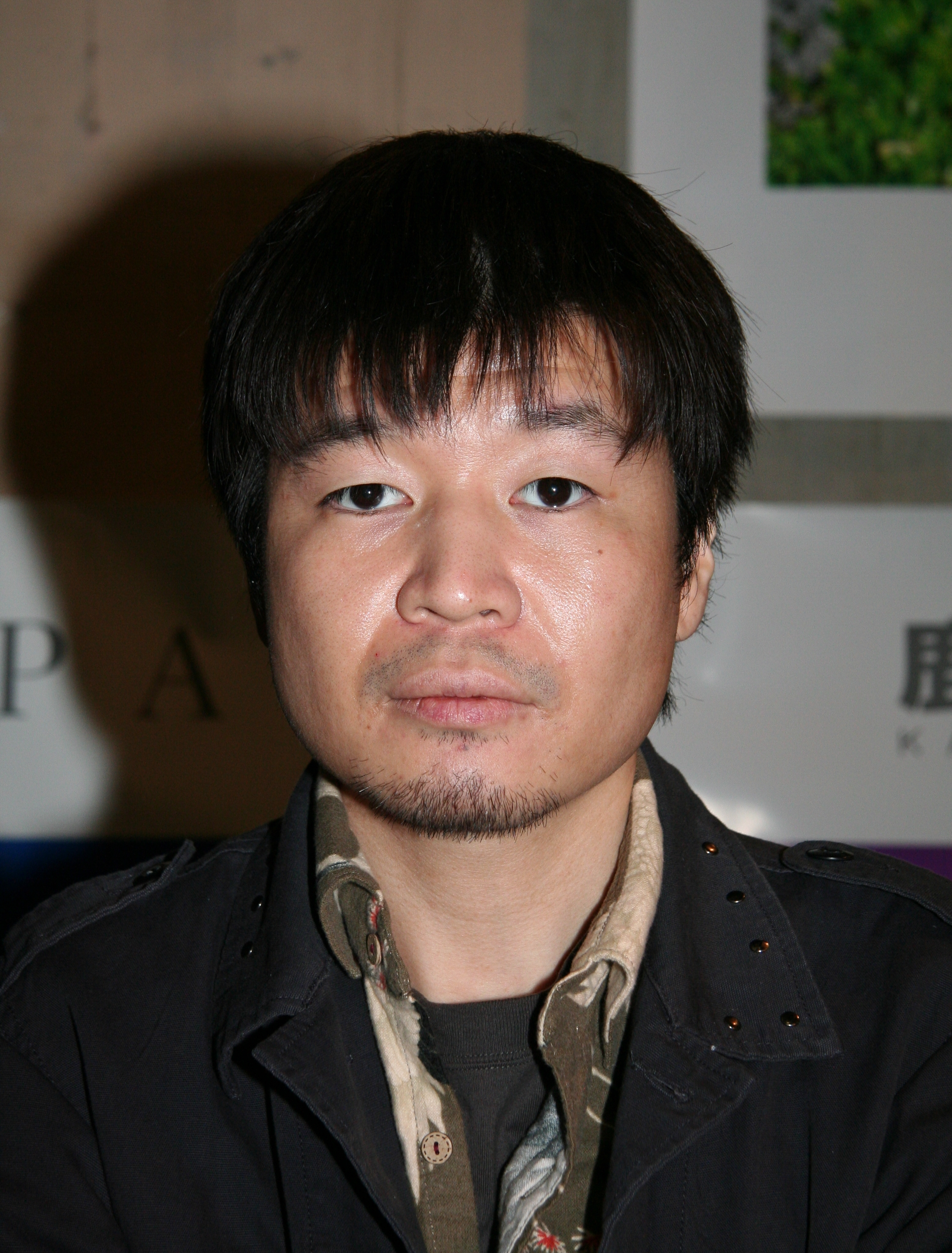
- Abe in 2007
- Born: August 3, 1971 (age 55); Meguro, Tokyo, Japan
- Education: Tokyo University of the Arts (MFA)
- Occupations: Manga artist, illustrator, screenwriter, character designer
- Years active: 1994-present
- Website: tokagegarou.com

Yoshitoshi Abe (安倍 吉俊, Abe Yoshitoshi; born August 3, 1971), also stylized as yoshitoshi ABe, is a Japanese graphic artist who works predominantly in anime and manga. He first gained fame for his work on the avant-garde anime Serial Experiments Lain. He is also responsible for the concept and character design for the series NieA_7. He is the creator of the doujinshi work Haibane Renmei, which was also adapted into an anime.

He is a colleague and friend of Chiaki J. Konaka, with whom he collaborated on the series Serial Experiments Lain and Texhnolyze. He usually uses the romaji form of his name instead of the kanji, with the "B" in "ABe" capitalized, as a reminder of his early works, for which he used the pen name "AB".

He is known to be a fairly tech-savvy manga artist, drawing a sketch with just his finger and an application on an iPad. He released self-published doujinshi on digital support bypassing the traditional print publishers with Pochiyama at the Pharmacy in 2008 aimed at iPhone and iPod Touch and I am an Alien, I have a Question in 2010 for Kindle.

== Personal life ==
On November 11, 2011, Abe married artist Sasaki Yukari, his manga assistant since 2010. Their daughter was born on September 21, 2012.

== Works ==
=== Anime ===
- Serial Experiments Lain (1998) (original character design)
- NieA_7 (2000) (original character design, scenario)
- Haibane Renmei (2002) (original creator, original character design, series composition, screenplay)
- Texhnolyze (2003) (original character design)
- Welcome to the N.H.K. (2006) (original character design)
- RErideD: Derrida, who leaps through time (2018) (original character design, screenplay for episodes 4, 8, and 10)
- Housing Complex C (2022) (original character design)
- Despera (TBA) (original character design)

=== Music ===
- Love Song (2005) (cover art and booklet illustrations)

=== Video games ===
- Wachenröder (1998)
- Phenomeno (2012)

=== Printed works ===
- Doujinshi
  - Furumachi (August, 1996)
  - Shooting Star (December, 1996)
  - White Rain (July, 1997)
  - Sui-Rin (August, 1998)
  - Charcoal Feather Federation (Haibane Renmei) (December, 1998)
  - T.Prevue Version 0.9 (August, 1999)
  - Faces (December, 1999)
  - K.S.M.E (July, 2000)
  - Sketches (December, 2000)
  - NieA Under 7 - Under (August, 2001)
  - Haibane Renmei - The Haibanes of Old Home (Ch.1) (August, 2001)
  - Haibane Renmei - The Haibanes of Old Home (Ch.2) (December, 2001)
  - Haibane Renmei - Haibane Lifestyle Diary (August, 2002)
  - Haibane Renmei - The Haibanes of Old Home (Extra) (December, 2002)
  - Ryuu Tai (July, 2003)
  - Not Found (December, 2003)
  - Haibane Renmei - Kyakuhonshuu - Volume 1 (August, 2004)
  - Haibane Renmei - Kyakuhonshuu - Volume 2 (December, 2004)
  - Haibane Renmei - Kyakuhonshuu - Volume 3 (December, 2004)
  - Miscellaneous (December, 2004)
  - GRID. (August, 2005)
  - Haibane Renmei - Kyakuhonshuu - Volume 4 (December, 2005)
  - Haibane Renmei - Kyakuhonshuu - Volume 5 (December, 2005)
  - Yakkyoku no Pochiyamasan (December, 2005)
  - Haibane Renmei - Kyakuhonshuu - Volume 6 (August, 2006)
  - Yakkyoku no Pochiyamasan 2.0 (August, 2006)
  - Yakkyoku no Pochiyamasan 3.0 (August 19, 2007)
  - f.p.o. (Fixed Point Observation) (August 17, 2008)
  - Ryuhshika (August 17, 2008)
  - Yakkyoku no Pochiyamasan 4.0 (December 30, 2008)
- Artbooks
  - Serial Experiments Lain - An Omnipresence in the Wired (May, 1999)
  - Visual Experiments Lain
  - Essence (May, 2001) *Released in the US*
  - NieA Under 7 - Scrap (July, 2001)
  - Haibane Renmei - In the Town of Guri, in the Garden of Charcoal Feathers (December, 2003)
  - yoshitoshi ABe lain illustrations - ab# rebuild an omnipresence in the wired (Japan: December 2005; US: April 2006)
  - Gaisokyu (August, 2007)
- Manga
  - Ame no Furu Basho (debut) Monthly Afternoon (April 1994; runner-up for Jiro Taniguchi Special Prize in Summer 1994 Afternoon Shiki Shō)
  - NieA Under 7 (Vol. 1) (June, 2001)
  - NieA Under 7 (Vol. 2) (August, 2001)
  - All You Need Is Kill (December, 2004)
  - Ryushika Ryushika (2009)
- Contributions
  - Mutekei Fire - Tarame Paradise Doujins
  - Mutekei Fire - Great Pictorial Guide of Uki-Uki in the World Doujins
  - Mutekei Fire - Tokimeki Shitsumon Bako Doujins
  - Range Murata - Flat
  - Range Murata - Rule - Fa Documenta 003
  - Range Murata - Robot - Volume 01
  - Range Murata - Robot - Volume 02
  - Range Murata - Robot - Volume 03
  - Range Murata - Robot - Volume 04
  - Range Murata - Robot - Volume 05
  - Range Murata - Robot - Volume 06
  - Range Murata - Robot - Volume 07
  - Range Murata - Robot - Volume 08
  - Range Murata - Robot - Volume 09
  - Range Murata - Robot - Volume 10 with "U.C.O."
  - Foo Swee Chin - Muzz Doujins 1-2
  - Akai Kiba (Red Fang) - Volumes 1-4
  - Hell Girl, episode 13 - sketches and wallpaint
- Cover Illustrations
  - Kami no Keifu Novels 1-3
  - Welcome to the N.H.K.
  - Negative Happy Chainsaw Edge
  - Chojin Keikaku (bunko edition only)
  - Slip Manga Collection
  - All You Need is Kill
- Misc.
  - "AB Note" yoshitoshi ABe Sketchbook (GoFa 2003)
  - "GoFa Portfolio Collection A" 20 A4 Prints (sold by GoFa at AX2003 - 100 made)
  - "GoFa Portfolio Collection B" 20 A4 Prints (Sold by GoFa at AX2003 - 100 made)
  - "Kaira" Wani Magazine Comics Special (July, 2008)
