= Chiaki J. Konaka =

Japanese writer and novelist (born 1961)

- 小中 千昭
- Born: Chiaki Konaka; April 4, 1961 (age 65); Tokyo, Japan
- Education: Seijo University
- Occupations: Screenwriter, novelist
- Relatives: Kazuya Konaka (younger brother)
- Writing career
- Years active: 1988–present
- Notable works: Ultraman Tiga (1996–97); Serial Experiments Lain (1998); Devil Lady (1998–99); The Big O (1999–2003); Digimon Tamers (2001–02); Hellsing (2001–02); Texhnolyze (2003); Ayakashi: Samurai Horror Tales (2006)

Chiaki J. Konaka (小中 千昭, Konaka Chiaki; born April 4, 1961) is a Japanese screenwriter and novelist. He was the head writer of anime series such as Serial Experiments Lain (1998), The Big O (1999–2003), Digimon Tamers (2001–02), Hellsing (2001–02), and Texhnolyze (2003), as well as the television drama Ultraman Tiga (1996–97).

== Personal life ==
Konaka was born in Tokyo, Japan on 4 April 1961. His interest in filmmaking began at the age of 10, influenced by his parents' love for movies and the wide range of film genres he experienced as a child.

Konaka gave himself the middle initial "J", evoking the Christian name "John", due to him being born to parents who were members of the Anglican Church, but he does not identify as Christian. He began using the middle initial at the age of 12, when he started making 8 mm films, patterning the style after Western names such as Charles M. Schulz. Following this, he received a camera of his own, and by middle school finished a film called Invader.

Upon entering Seikei High School, Konaka joined the school's film club where he met Makoto Tezuka who was his senior. His films during this period adopted largely science-fiction themes, and it wasn't until watching The Exorcist and The Legend of Hell House that he began to garner an interest in horror.

While working in special effects after graduating college, Konaka was offered his first scriptwriting job on Teruyoshi Ishii's 1988 Japanese horror film Jaganrei. This served as a starting point for working on future projects.

He has previously worked as a screenwriting instructor at The Film School of Tokyo.

== Artistry and themes ==
Konaka's serious works generally have a dark, psychological tone. As a Cthulhu Mythos writer, he tends to add Lovecraftian elements to his works. He has cited Ghost Hound as his favorite screenwriting project.

The story-line of the early episodes of Digimon Tamers was based on one of the original scripts by Chiaki and Kazuya Konaka for Gamera: Guardian of the Universe in 1995 before the final draft by Kazunori Itō. Konaka brothers' plot was later used for Digimon Tamers and Gamera the Brave in 2006.

=== DigiFes 2021 ===
In 2021, Konaka wrote a stage drama for Digimon Tamers' 20th anniversary that was performed at DigiFes 2021, an official Digimon event held annually on August 1. The drama featured the cast of the show being confronted by a physical manifestation of "political correctness" that uses "cancel culture" as an attack. This brought attention to his blog meant for retrospective commentary on Digimon Tamers, in which he also discussed conspiracy theories.

== List of works ==
=== Anime ===
- Air Gear: Series composition, script
- Armitage III: Screenplay
- Astro Boy (2003): Script (eps 1–3, 14)
- The Big O: Series composition, Screenplay, script
- Birdy the Mighty: Screenplay
- Bubblegum Crisis Tokyo 2040: Screenplay
- Catnapped!: Screenplay
- Despera: Script
- Devil Lady: Script (episodes 1–5, 8, 12, 18, 25–26), series composition
- Digimon Adventure 02: Scenario (episode 13)
- Digimon Tamers: Series composition, script (episodes 1–3, 7, 13–14, 23–24, 34–35, 41, 44–45, 49–51)
- Futari Ecchi: Script
- Gasaraki: Script
- GeGeGe no Kitarō (1996): Script (Episode 89 only)
- Ghost Hound: Series composition, screenplay
- GR: Giant Robo: Series composition
- Hellsing: Series composition, script (episodes 1–6, 8–9, 11–13)
- Magic User's Club: Script (eps 2–6), novelization (1, 2, 5, 6)
- Malice@Doll: Script, original story
- Mononoke: Script
- Parasite Dolls: Script
- Princess Tutu: Script (4, 9, 22, 23)
- RahXephon: Screenplay (episodes 11–12, 17–18, 24–25)
- RahXephon: Pluralitas Concentio: Screenplay
- Serial Experiments Lain: Miniseries composition, script
- Shadow Star: Series composition, script (eps 1–3, 12–13)
- Texhnolyze: Series composition, script, scenario (episodes 1–4, 6, 12, 20–22)
- Undead Girl Murder Farce: Script (eps 5-8)
- Vampire Princess Miyu: Script (ep 20)

=== Television dramas ===
- Ultraman: Towards the Future: Original story (episodes 4, 11)
- Ultraman Tiga: Screenplay (eps 3, 5–6, 9, 19–20, 25, 34–35, 43–44, 50–52)
- Ultraman Gaia: Series composition, screenplay (eps 1–3, 5, 10, 18, 26, 40, 42, 50–51)
- Ultra Q: Dark Fantasy: Screenplay (episodes 7, 24–25)
- Ultraman Max: Screenplay (eps 27, 29–30, 38–39)

=== Cthulhu Mythos ===
- Cthulhu's Strange Record
- Insumasu wo Oou Kage (a Japanese television adaptation of The Shadow Over Innsmouth)
- "Terror Rate", a short story included in Volume 2 of the Lairs of the Hidden Gods anthology (Kurodahan Press: ISBN 4-902075-12-1)

=== Novel ===
- Marebito (also screenplay of 2004 feature film)

=== Video games ===
- Serial Experiments Lain
- Kowloon's Curse
