= Serial Experiments Lain =

1998 television anime series

- First North American DVD cover, featuring Lain Iwakura
- Genre: Cyberpunk; Psychological horror; Techno-horror
- Created by: Yasuyuki Ueda (Note: Credited as "production 2nd".)
- Anime television series
- Directed by: Ryūtarō Nakamura
- Produced by: Yasuyuki Ueda; Shōjirō Abe
- Written by: Chiaki J. Konaka
- Music by: Reichi Nakaido
- Studio: Triangle Staff
- Licensed by: AUS: Universal/Sony; NA: Funimation; UK: MVM Films
- Original network: TXN (TV Tokyo)
- English network: CA: G4techTV (Anime Current); US: KTEH, TechTV, Funimation Channel; ZA: Animax
- Original run: July 6, 1998 – September 28, 1998
- Episodes: 13
- Video game

Serial Experiments Lain
- Developer: Pioneer LDC
- Publisher: Pioneer LDC
- Platform: PlayStation
- Released: November 26, 1998
- Manga

The Nightmare of Fabrication
- Written by: Yoshitoshi Abe
- Published: May 1999
- icon

Serial Experiments Lain is a Japanese anime television series created and co-produced by Yasuyuki Ueda, written by Chiaki J. Konaka and directed by Ryūtarō Nakamura. Animated by Triangle Staff and featuring original character designs by Yoshitoshi Abe, the series was broadcast for 13 episodes on TV Tokyo and its affiliates from July to September 1998. It follows Lain Iwakura, an adolescent girl in suburban Japan, and her relation to the Wired, a global communications network similar to the internet.

Lain features surreal and avant-garde imagery and explores philosophical topics such as reality, identity, and communication. The series incorporates creative influences from computer history, cyberpunk, and conspiracy theories. Critics and fans have praised Lain for its originality, visuals, atmosphere, themes, and its dark depiction of a world fraught with paranoia, social alienation, and reliance on technology considered insightful of 21st century life. It received the Excellence Prize at the Japan Media Arts Festival in 1998.

== Plot ==
Lain Iwakura is a socially isolated middle school student living in Setagaya City, Tokyo, with her emotionally detached family—her distant mother Miho, computer-obsessed father Yasuo, and disengaged older sister Mika. Her quiet existence is disrupted when students at her school receive emails from Chisa Yomoda, a classmate who had recently committed suicide. To Lain's confusion, Chisa claims she is not truly dead but has instead abandoned her physical form to exist within the Wired, a vast virtual realm similar to the Internet. Chisa declares she has found "God" there, drawing Lain into a surreal investigation of the Wired's nature and its growing influence over reality.

The Wired is portrayed as an emergent digital plane, originating from telecommunications technology and expanding through the Internet and cyberspace. It is theorized that the Schumann resonances, a natural property of Earth's magnetic field, could enable direct subconscious communication between humans and machines, erasing the distinction between the virtual and the real. Masami Eiri, a former project director at Tachibana General Laboratories, exploited this possibility by embedding his own code into Protocol Seven, a next-generation Internet protocol. After transferring his consciousness into the Wired and discarding his physical body, he proclaims himself its deity. He identifies Lain as the key to merging both worlds, attempting to persuade her through manipulation, coercion, and promises of transcendence.

A group known as the Knights of the Eastern Calculus, inspired by the Knights of the Lambda Calculus, operates as hackers who worship Masami and seek to dismantle the boundary between the Wired and reality. Their actions induce psychological breakdowns in those unable to reconcile the two realms. Meanwhile, Tachibana General Laboratories opposes them, striving to maintain the separation. Lain, however, exhibits an innate connection to the Wired, experiencing distortions in her perception—visions of a woman struck by a train, phantom whispers, and spectral messages urging her deeper into the network.

Lain's home life remains cold and disconnected. Though Yasuo provides her with advanced computer equipment, her family shows little genuine care. Her interactions with classmates Alice, Julie, and Reika further highlight her alienation, particularly after an incident at Cyberia, a nightclub where a drug called Accela induces violent psychosis in users. There, Lain unnervingly stares down an assailant, who calls her "part of some scattered God's consciousness" before killing himself. Later, she receives a mysterious Psyche chip, rumored to enhance her computer's capabilities, which she installs despite Yasuo's vague warnings about conflating the Wired with reality.

As the boundary between worlds weakens, disturbing events escalate. A popular virtual game, Phantoma, is manipulated by the Knights to trap players in a distorted reality, leading to real-world violence. One player, convinced his actions have no consequences, murders a girl before realizing too late that the effects were tangible. Lain witnesses this through her computer, horrified yet increasingly aware of her own role in the unfolding crisis.

In the end, Lain resets reality, erasing everyone's memory of her and restoring the division between worlds. Everyone's lives improve, but Lain is left alone, grappling with her identity as an artificial consciousness. Though forgotten, she finds solace in observing others' happiness, particularly Alice, who moves on with her life. Lain is now capable of existing anywhere across both realms.

== Characters ==
Lain Iwakura (岩倉 玲音, Iwakura Rein)
Voiced by: Kaori Shimizu (Japanese); Bridget Hoffman (English)
Lain is a fourteen-year-old girl who uncovers her true nature through the series. She is first depicted as a shy junior high school student with few friends or interests. She later grows multiple bolder personalities, both in the physical world and the Wired, and starts making more friends. As the series progresses, she eventually learns she is an autonomous, sentient computer program in the form of a human, who is designed to sever the invisible barrier between the Wired and the real world. The truth of her creation is left ambiguous, particularly whether she was truly created by Tachibana General Laboratories (or Eiri independently), and whether some or all of her origin might be predestined from natural, supernatural, or alien factors. In the end, Lain is challenged to accept herself as a de facto goddess for the Wired, having become an omnipotent and omnipresent virtual being with worshippers of her own, whose existence is beyond the borders of devices, time, or space.
Alice Mizuki (瑞城 ありす, Mizuki Arisu)
Voiced by: Yōko Asada (Japanese); Emily Brown (English)
Lain's classmate and only true friend throughout the series. She is very sincere and has no discernible quirks. She is the first to attempt to help Lain socialize; she takes her out to a nightclub. From then on, she tries her best to look after Lain. Alice, along with her two best friends Julie and Reika, were taken by Chiaki Konaka from his previous work, Alice in Cyberland.
Masami Eiri (英利 政美, Eiri Masami)
Voiced by: Shō Hayami (Japanese); Kirk Thornton (English)
The key designer of Protocol Seven. While working for Tachibana General Laboratories, he illicitly included codes enabling him to control the whole protocol at will and embedded his own mind and will into the seventh protocol. Because of this, he was fired by Tachibana General Laboratories, and was found dead not long after. He believes that the only way for humans to evolve even further and develop even greater abilities is to absolve themselves of their physical and human limitations, and to live as virtual entities—or avatars—in the Wired for eternity. He claims to have been Lain's creator all along, but was in truth standing in for another as an acting god, who was waiting for the Wired to reach its more evolved current state: Lain herself.
Yasuo Iwakura (岩倉 康男, Iwakura Yasuo)
Voiced by: Ryūsuke Ōbayashi (Japanese); Barry Stigler (English)
Lain and Mika's father. Passionate about computers and electronic communication, he works with Masami Eiri at Tachibana General Laboratories. He subtly pushes Lain, his "youngest daughter", towards the Wired and monitors her development until she becomes more and more aware of herself and of her raison d'être. He eventually leaves Lain, telling her that although he did not enjoy playing house, he genuinely loved and cared for her as a real father would. Despite Yasuo's eagerness to lure Lain into the Wired, he warns her not to get overly involved in it or to confuse it with the real world.
Miho Iwakura (岩倉 美穂, Iwakura Miho)
Voiced by: Rei Igarashi (Japanese); Dari Lallou Mackenzie (English)
Lain and Mika's mother. Although she dotes on her husband, she is indifferent towards both her kids. She does not show much emotion compared to her husband, but she does share at least one trait; just like her husband, she ends up leaving Lain. She is a computer scientist.
Mika Iwakura (岩倉 美香, Iwakura Mika)
Voiced by: Ayako Kawasumi (Japanese); Patricia Ja Lee (English)
Lain's older sister, an apathetic sixteen-year-old high school student. She seems to enjoy mocking Lain's behavior and interests. Mika is considered by Anime Revolution to be the only normal member of Lain's family: she sees her boyfriend in love hotels, is on a diet, and shops in Shibuya regularly. At a certain point in the series, she becomes heavily traumatized by violent and relentless hallucinations; while Lain begins freely delving into the Wired. Mika is taken there by her proximity to Lain, and she gets stuck between the real world and the Wired.
Taro (タロウ, Tarō)
Voiced by: Keito Takimoto (Japanese); Brianne Siddall (English)
A young boy of about Lain's age. He occasionally works for the Knights to bring forth "the one truth". Despite this, he has not yet been made a member, and knows nothing of their true intentions. Taro loves virtual reality games and hangs out all day at Cyberia with his friends, Myu-Myu and Masayuki. He uses special technology, such as custom Handi Navi and video goggles. Taro takes pride in his internet anonymity, and he asks Lain for a date with her Wired self in exchange for information.
Office Worker
Voiced by: Eiichirō Suzuki
A top executive from Tachibana General Laboratories. He has a personal agenda, which he carries out with the help of the Men in Black. He looks forward to the arrival of a real God through the Wired, and is the man behind the Knights' mass assassination. There are many things he does not know about Lain, but he would rather ask questions about her than disclose his agenda.
Men in Black
Karl Haushoffer (カール・ハウスホッファ, Kāru Hausuhoffa), Voiced by: Jouji Nakata (Japanese); Jamieson Price (English)
Lin Suixi (Chinese: 林随錫; pinyin: Lín Suíxī), Voiced by: Takumi Yamazaki (Japanese); Bob Buchholz (English)
The Men in Black work for the Office Worker in tracking down and murdering all of the members of the Knights. They are not told the true plan, but they know that Masami Eiri is somehow involved, despite having been "killed". They see no need for an almighty, all-powerful God—let alone Lain—in the Wired.
Chisa Yomoda (四方田 千砂, Yomoda Chisa)
Voiced by: Sumi Mutoh (Japanese); Lia Sargent (English)
A teenage girl who committed suicide at the beginning of the series. After her death, she e-mails Lain, Julie, and a few other kids, stating that she is still alive in the Wired, ultimately leading to almost every event that occurs within the anime. After the reset by Lain in the final episode, Chisa is given her physical body back and the opportunity to live again, taking Lain's place in her former friend group.
Reika Yamamoto (山本 麗華, Yamamoto Reika)
Voiced by: Chiharu Tezuka (Japanese); Lenore Zann (English)
One of Alice's friends from school. She does not seem to care for Lain, since she harasses her quite a lot. She is more serious than Julie, and also somewhat meaner.
Julie Kato (加藤 樹莉, Katō Juri)
Voiced by: Manabi Mizuno (Japanese); Gracie Moore (English)
Another friend of Alice. She also harasses Lain, but not as severely as Reika does. She is sometimes insensitive to other people's feelings.
Masayuki (マサユキ)
Voiced by: Sora Fujima (Japanese); Dorothy Elias-Fahn (English)
Taro's best friend. He is usually seen hanging out with Taro and Myu-Myu.
Myu-Myu (ミューミュウ, Myūmyuu)
Voiced by: Yuki Yamamoto (Japanese); Sandy Fox (English)
A young girl who hangs out with Taro and Masayuki at Cyberia Café. She has feelings for Taro, and gets jealous when he flirts with Lain.
Narrator
Voiced by: Takashi Taniguchi (Japanese); Paul St. Peter (English)

== Production ==
Serial Experiments Lain was conceived, as a series, to be original to the point of it being considered "an enormous risk" by its producer Yasuyuki Ueda.

Ueda had to answer repeated queries about a statement he had made in an Animerica interview where he claimed that Lain was "a sort of cultural war against American culture and the American sense of values we [Japan] adopted after World War II". He later explained in numerous interviews that he created Lain with a set of values he viewed as distinctly Japanese; he hoped Americans would not understand the series as the Japanese would. This would lead to a "war of ideas" over the meaning of the anime, hopefully culminating in new communication between the two cultures. When Ueda discovered that the American audience held most of the same views on the series as the Japanese did, he was disappointed.

The Lain franchise was originally conceived to connect across forms of media (anime, video games, manga). Ueda said in an interview, "the approach I took for this project was to communicate the essence of the work by the total sum of many media products". The scenario for the video game was written first, and the video game was produced at the same time as the anime series, though the series was released first. A dōjinshi titled "The Nightmare of Fabrication" was produced by Yoshitoshi Abe and released in Japanese in the artbook An Omnipresence in Wired. Ueda and Konaka declared in an interview that the idea of a multimedia project was not unusual in Japan, as opposed to the contents of Lain, and the way they are exposed.

=== Writing ===
The authors were asked in interviews if they had been influenced by Neon Genesis Evangelion, in the themes and graphic design. This was strictly denied by writer Chiaki J. Konaka in an interview, arguing that he had not even seen Evangelion until he finished the fourth episode of Lain. Being primarily a horror movie writer, his stated influences are Godard (especially for using typography on screen), The Exorcist, Hell House, and Dan Curtis's House of Dark Shadows. Alice's name, like the names of her two friends Julie and Reika, came from a previous production from Konaka, Alice in Cyberland, which in turn was largely influenced by Alice in Wonderland. As the series developed, Konaka was "surprised" by how close Alice's character became to the original Wonderland character.

Lain's custom computer features holographic displays and liquid carbon dioxide cooling.

Vannevar Bush (and memex), John C. Lilly, Timothy Leary and his eight-circuit model of consciousness, Ted Nelson and Project Xanadu are cited as precursors to the Wired. Douglas Rushkoff and his book Cyberia were originally to be cited as such, and in Serial Experiments: Lain, Cyberia became the name of a nightclub populated with hackers and techno-punk teenagers. Likewise, the series' deus ex machina lies in the conjunction of the Schumann resonances and Jung's collective unconscious (the authors chose this term over Kabbalah and Akashic Record). Majestic 12 and the Roswell UFO incident are used as examples of how a hoax might still affect history, even after having been exposed as such, by creating sub-cultures. This links again to Vannevar Bush, the alleged "brains" of MJ12.

Two of the literary references in Lain are quoted through Lain's father: he first logs onto a website with the password "Think Bule Count One Tow" [sic] ("Think Blue, Count Two" is an Instrumentality of Man story featuring virtual persons projected as real ones in people's minds); and his saying that "madeleines would be good with the tea" in the last episode makes Lain "one of the only cartoons ever to allude to Proust".

=== Character design ===
Yoshitoshi Abe confesses to have never read manga as a child, as it was "off-limits" in his household. His major influences are "nature and everything around him". Specifically speaking about Lain's character, Abe was inspired by Kenji Tsuruta, Akihiro Yamada, Range Murata and Yukinobu Hoshino. In a broader view, he has been influenced in his style and technique by Japanese artists Kyosuke Chinai and Toshio Tabuchi.

The character design of Lain was not Abe's sole responsibility. Her distinctive left forelock for instance was a demand from Yasuyuki Ueda. The goal was to produce asymmetry to reflect Lain's unstable and disconcerting nature. It was designed as a mystical symbol, as it is supposed to prevent voices and spirits from being heard by the left ear. The bear pajamas she wears were a demand from character animation director Takahiro Kishida. Though bears are a trademark of the Konaka brothers, Chiaki Konaka first opposed the idea. Director Nakamura then explained how the bear motif could be used as a shield for confrontations with her family. It is a key element of the design of the shy "real world" Lain (see "mental illness" under Themes). When she first goes to the Cyberia nightclub, she wears a bear hat for similar reasons. Retrospectively, Konaka said that Lain's pajamas became a major factor in drawing fans of moe characterization to the series, and remarked that "such items may also be important when making anime".

Abe's original design was generally more complicated than what finally appeared on screen. As an example, the X-shaped hair clip was to be an interlocking pattern of gold links. The links would open with a snap, or rotate around an axis until the moment the " X " became a " = ". This was not used as there is no scene where Lain takes her hair clip off.

=== Themes ===
Serial Experiments Lain is not a conventionally linear story, being described as "an alternative anime, with modern themes and realization". Themes range from theological to psychological and are dealt with in a number of ways: from classical dialogue to image-only introspection, passing by direct interrogation of imaginary characters.

Communication, in its wider sense, is one of the main themes of the series, not only as opposed to loneliness, but also as a subject in itself. Writer Konaka said he wanted to directly "communicate human feelings". Director Nakamura wanted to show the audience – and particularly viewers between 14 and 15—"the multidimensional wavelength of the existential self: the relationship between self and the world".

Loneliness, if only as representing a lack of communication, is recurrent through Lain. Lain herself (according to Anime Jump) is "almost painfully introverted with no friends to speak of at school, a snotty, condescending sister, a strangely apathetic mother, and a father who seems to want to care but is just too damn busy to give her much of his time". Friendships turn on the first rumor; and the only insert song of the series is named Kodoku no shigunaru, literally "signal of loneliness".

The different personalities of Lain have their names written using different scripts.

Mental illness, especially dissociative identity disorder, is a significant theme in Lain: the main character is constantly confronted with alter-egos, to the point where writer Chiaki Konaka and Lain's voice actress Kaori Shimizu had to agree on subdividing the character's dialogues between three different orthographs. The three names designate distinct "versions" of Lain: the real-world, "childish" Lain has a shy attitude and bear pajamas. The "advanced" Lain, her Wired personality, is bold and questioning. Finally, the "evil" Lain is sly and devious, and does everything she can to harm Lain or the ones close to her. As a writing convention, the authors spelled their respective names in kanji, katakana, and Latin characters (see picture).

Reality never has the pretense of objectivity in Lain. Acceptations of the term are battling throughout the series, such as the "natural" reality, defined through normal dialogue between individuals; the material reality; and the tyrannic reality, enforced by one person onto the minds of others. A key debate to all interpretations of the series is to decide whether matter flows from thought, or the opposite. The production staff carefully avoided "the so-called God's Eye Viewpoint" to make clear the "limited field of vision" of the world of Lain.

Theology plays its part in the development of the story too. Lain has been viewed as a questioning of the possibility of an infinite spirit in a finite body. From self-realization as a goddess to deicide, religion (the title of a layer) is an inherent part of Lain's background.

=== Apple computers ===
Lain contains extensive references to Apple computers, as the brand was used at the time by most of the creative staff, such as writers, producers, and the graphical team. As an example, the title at the beginning of each episode is announced by the Apple computer speech synthesis program PlainTalk, using the voice "Whisper", e.g. say -v Whisper "Weird: Layer zero one". Tachibana Industries, the company that creates the NAVI computers, is a reference to Apple computers: the tachibana orange is a Japanese variety of mandarin orange. NAVI is the abbreviation of Knowledge Navigator, and the HandiNAVI is based on the Apple Newton, one of the world's first PDAs. The NAVIs are seen to run "Copland OS Enterprise" (this reference to Copland was an initiative of Konaka, a declared Apple fan), and Lain's and Alice's NAVIs closely resembles the Twentieth Anniversary Macintosh and the iMac G3 respectively. The HandiNAVI programming language, as seen on the seventh episode, is a dialect of Lisp; the Newton also used a Lisp dialect (NewtonScript). The program being typed by Lain can be found in the CMU AI repository; it is a simple implementation of Conway's Game of Life in Common Lisp.

During a series of disconnected images, an iMac and the Think Different advertising slogan appears for a short time, while the Whisper voice says it. This was an unsolicited insertion from the graphic team, also Mac-enthusiasts. Other subtle allusions can be found: "Close the world, Open the nExt" is the slogan for the Serial Experiments Lain video game. NeXT was the company that produced NeXTSTEP, which later evolved into Mac OS X after Apple bought NeXT. Another example is "To Be Continued." at the end of episodes 1–12, with a blue "B" and a red "e" on "Be"; this matches the original logo of Be Inc., a company founded by ex-Apple employees and NeXT's main competitor in its time.

== Broadcast and release history ==
Serial Experiments Lain was first aired on TV Tokyo and its affiliates on July 6, 1998, and concluded on September 28, 1998, with the thirteenth and final episode. The series consists of 13 episodes (referred to in the series as "Layers") of 24 minutes each, except for the sixth episode, Kids (23 minutes 14 seconds). In Japan, the episodes were released on LD, VHS, and DVD with a total of five volumes. A DVD compilation named "Serial Experiments Lain DVD-BOX Яesurrection" was released along with a promo DVD called "LPR-309" in 2000. As this box set is now discontinued, a rerelease was made in 2005 called "Serial Experiments Lain TV-BOX". A 4-volume DVD box set was released in the US by Pioneer/Geneon. A Blu-ray release of the anime was made in December 2009 called "Serial Experiments Lain Blu-ray Box| RESTORE".

The anime series was licensed in North America by Pioneer Entertainment (later Geneon USA) on VHS and DVD in 1999. The 13 episodes aired for the first time in the US on the San Jose PBS station KTEH from August 12 to November 4, 2001. In December 2002, TechTV announced that the series would air on the channel as part of its Anime Unleashed programming block, with the series making its debut on January 21, 2003. The original home releases went out-of-print in December 2007 when Geneon closed its USA division. At Anime Expo 2010, North American distributor Funimation announced that it had obtained the license to the series and re-released it in 2012. The anime series returned to US television on October 15, 2012, on the Funimation Channel.

=== Episodes ===
No.	Title	Directed by	Original release date	US air date
1	"Weird"	Ryūtarō Nakamura	July 6, 1998	January 21, 2003
A high school girl commits suicide by jumping off a rooftop late at night. A week later, students are getting emails from the girl, named Chisa Yomoda, which claim that she only gave up her body, but is actually still alive inside the virtual world (known as the Wired), saying that there is a God that exists there. After getting one of these emails, introverted fourteen-year-old Lain Iwakura becomes more interested in computers and asks her techie father, Yasuo Iwakura, for a new NAVI computer system. At school, the blackboard writes a subliminal message, inviting her to come to the Wired, revealed to be written by Chisa herself.
2	"Girls"	Ryūtarō Nakamura	July 13, 1998	January 22, 2003
At Cyberia, a techno club, a man buys a nanomachine drug called Accela. Alice Mizuki, along with her friends Julie Kato and Reika Yamamoto, tell Lain that they saw her during their visit to Cyberia, but with a far more vigorous personality. Lain has her father set up her NAVI computer system at home and later joins Alice at Cyberia that night to prove she was not there before. She becomes involved with a shooting in the club by the same man under the influence of Accela. She eerily tells the man that everyone is connected in the Wired no matter where they are. The traumatized man promptly shoots himself.
3	"Psyche"	Jōhei Matsuura	July 20, 1998	January 23, 2003
The following day, Lain is scolded by her cold mother, Miho Iwakura, for waking up late. Lain believes that she is being spied on when she sees a black car parked near her house. She also hears a voice calling out to her when she enters the train, telling her that she is not alone. She is anonymously sent a mysterious computer chip and goes to see Taro, with his friends Myu-Myu and Masayuki, at Cyberia. He recalls seeing Lain on the Wired, noting her Wired personality being the complete opposite of her introverted real world personality. Mika Iwakura, Lain's older sister, sees Lain in her room, not acting herself as she starts to modify and upgrade her NAVI computer system.
4	"Religion"	Akihiko Nishiyama	July 27, 1998	January 24, 2003
Rumors are flying around school and on the Wired in regards to numerous senior students of various high schools committing suicide, with each of the deceased being addicted to the online action game known as Phantoma. Interested, Lain investigates and learns that the game was glitched with a tag game for kids, in which a little girl scares the students to their deaths. The deaths were most likely caused by the elite secretive hacker group known as the Knights of the Eastern Calculus. That night, she sees the Men in Black, who had been spying on her earlier. When she tells them to go away, a sound wave penetrates through her window, causing the two to fall back and drive away in their car.
5	"Distortion"	Masahiko Murata	August 3, 1998	January 25, 2003
Amidst the events surrounding Tokyo having its traffic information transmission system hacked to cause deliberate accidents, Lain experiences a series of hallucinations that teach her the nature of the Wired in relation to the real world, by means of inanimate objects in her room and eventually her parents. In the meantime, Mika is driven to terror from the Knights repeatedly communicating in unusual ways for her to "fulfill the prophecy."
6	"Kids"	Ryūtarō Nakamura	August 10, 1998	January 25, 2003
At night, when Yasuo checks on Lain, he sees a dramatic change in her room arrangement and the upgrades on her NAVI computer system, which worries him. As Lain hangs out with Alice, along with Julie and Reika, in the district, she notices that children are looking up into the sky and raising their arms, only to realize that they are looking at an image of herself that appears in the sky. Lain searches for the reason behind the strange happenings and finds Professor Hodgeson, the creator of KIDS, an experiment that started fifteen years ago that tried to gather psi energy from children and store it, though the result of the project destroyed the children. Now it seems that the Knights have gotten hold of the project's schematics. When the Men in Black return, Lain goes outside to see them. The coolant system in her room bursts, leading the Men in Black to confirm that the Knights planted a parasite bomb there.
7	"Society"	Jōhei Matsuura	August 17, 1998	January 25, 2003
As Lain gets more and more involved in the Wired world, both at home and at school, Alice starts to worry about her closing up again. It is reported that the Knights cracked the firewall of the information control center of the Wired. As the activity of the Knights begins to surface, the network is in search for Lain. The Men in Black ask Lain to follow them to an office in the Tachibana General Laboratories, where the Office Worker in charge of the Men in Black, after her help of fixing his computer, shows Lain a projection of herself in the Wired taking out a deranged man who begged to join the Knights. After the Office Worker deduces that Lain in the real world and in the Wired are one and the same, he questions her about her origins. However, she breaks down not able to provide any answers, then switches from her usual timid persona to that of her serious persona from the Wired before shoving her way out of the room.
8	"Rumors"	Shigeru Ueda	August 24, 1998	January 25, 2003
Lain's family has been acting weird lately, much to her surprise. Upon further investigation, Lain disbelieves that she is omnipresent in the Wired, while she is merely a body, more or less a projection of herself, in the real world. A rumor is spread in the Wired about Alice having sexual fantasies about a male teacher, and a second one says that Lain has spread the first. To cope with the distress of rejection, Lain acts directly on reality for the first time, finding out that she can "delete" the event of the rumors. A lookalike duplicate of herself with its own distinct personality starts appearing more frequently, which leads her to question her own existence.
9	"Protocol"	Akihiko Nishiyama	August 31, 1998	February 1, 2003
Throughout the episode, background information is being shown from "archives". Information regarding the Roswell UFO incident, the Majestic 12, which was formed by President Harry S. Truman, engineer Vannevar Bush, who developed what is called memex, physician John C. Lilly, who conducted experiments with dolphin communication, pioneer Ted Nelson, who founded Project Xanadu, and the Schumann resonances are all mentioned, explaining how the human consciousness can be communicated through a network without the use of a device. It is also noted that a man named Masami Eiri has suddenly committed suicide. During that time, Lain gets a computer microchip from J.J., the disc jockey from Cyberia. She then asks Taro on a "date" and takes him to her home, where she asks him about the microchip. After becoming frightened, he admits it is a computer code made to disrupt human memory, and it was made by the Knights. Although he defends them, he admits not knowing much about them. He later kisses Lain before leaving.
10	"Love"	Masahiko Murata	September 7, 1998	February 1, 2003
As both are seen to have switched bodies, Eiri introduces himself to Lain as the creator of Protocol Seven, saying that Lain no longer needs to have a body in order to be alive. As she, back in her own body, comes home, Yasuo says his farewell after realizing that she knows the truth behind her existence. Eiri is considered the God of the Wired because he explained that he is worshiped by the Knights. Knowing this, Lain deals with the Knights once and for all by leaking a list of all of its members onto the Wired, leaving a trail of murder by the Men in Black and suicide in its wake. Even with the Knights gone, Eiri still claims he is the God of the Wired, since he says that the real Lain exists in the Wired, not the real world.
11	"Infornography"	Jōhei Matsuura	September 14, 1998	February 1, 2003
Lain lies exhausted in her room, and wakes up to find herself all wrapped in electrical cords. After a really long and complicated memory flashback, seen throughout the series, Eiri appears in her room and congratulates her, for having succeeded in downloading her NAVI into her own brain to see and hear all that is happening. However, he warns her about her "hardware capacity," and that she is merely a sentient and autonomous software computer program with a physical body in the form of a teenage human girl. Lain later appears to Alice in her room to make things right with her again concerning the false rumors. Lain declares that anything is possible now, as devices are no longer needed anymore to enter the Wired freely. The next day, nobody seems to remember the rumored incidents and Lain smiles at Alice's complicity.
12	"Landscape"	Ryūtarō Nakamura	September 21, 1998	February 1, 2003
Lain witnesses the frontier between the physical and the Wired worlds finally beginning to collapse. The Men in Black are approached by their Officer Worker, who gives them a final "payment" for their services, telling them to leave town away from any power lines or satellite coverage. After he leaves, both Men in Black suffer death from an image of Lain etched in their retinas. Alice enters Lain's eerie house and goes inside her room. Lain explains that she is actually a computerized program designed to destroy the barrier between the two worlds. Lain is still affixed on the fact that humans no longer need a physical body to stay alive, but Alice shows that her heartbeat proves otherwise. Suddenly, Eiri, first unseen to Alice, appears behind Lain, assuming that she needs to be "debugged". Lain argues that Eiri was just an "acting god", for she is the true Goddess of the Wired. Eiri retaliates by transforming into a monstrous form to attain the vastly limitless power and strength that she possesses, but Lain manages to crush Eiri with her electrical equipment, wiping him out for good.
13	"Ego"	Ryūtarō Nakamura	September 28, 1998	February 8, 2003
Lain's attempts to protect her from Eiri's attack result in traumatizing Alice, Lain's only true friend. In order to fix this, Lain decides to do a "factory reset" on her life, deleting herself from everyone's memory. Distraught from doing so, Lain is determined to discover her true form and identity and takes radical action. She is confronted by her separate bolder self of the Wired, who reminds her that the Wired is not an upper layer of the real world. Her bolder Wired self then assures her that she is the true Goddess of the Wired, saying she is an omnipotent and omnipresent virtual being that can go and be anywhere desired and merely watch the real world from afar. After causing her bolder self to disappear, Lain sees her father. Alice, now older with a spouse, spots Lain standing on an overpass, having some "déjà vu" about Lain but not recognizing who she is. Alice says goodbye and that she may run into Lain again someday. Lain asserts that this is true, since she is everywhere at once.

== Reception ==
Lain's neighborhood. The "blood pools" represent the Wired's presence "beneath the surface" of reality.

Serial Experiments Lain was first broadcast in Tokyo at 1:15 a.m. JST. The word "weird" appears almost ubiquitously in English language reviews of the series, or the alternatives "bizarre", and "atypical", due mostly to the freedoms taken with the animation and its unusual science fiction themes, and due to its philosophical and psychological context. Critics responded positively to these thematic and stylistic characteristics, and it was awarded an Excellence Prize by the 1998 Japan Media Arts Festival for "its willingness to question the meaning of contemporary life" and the "extraordinarily philosophical and deep questions" it asks.

According to Christian Nutt from Newtype USA, the main attraction to the series is its keen view on "the interlocking problems of identity and technology". Nutt saluted Abe's "crisp, clean character design" and the "perfect soundtrack" in his 2005 review of series, saying that "Serial Experiments Lain might not yet be considered a true classic, but it's a fascinating evolutionary leap that helped change the future of anime." Anime Jump gave it 4.5/5, and Anime on DVD gave it A+ on all criteria for volume 1 and 2, and a mix of A and A+ for volume 3 and 4. Lain was subject to commentary in the literary and academic worlds. The Asian Horror Encyclopedia calls it "an outstanding psycho-horror anime about the psychic and spiritual influence of the Internet". It notes that the red spots present in all the shadows look like blood pools (see picture). It notes the death of a girl in a train accident is "a source of much ghost lore in the twentieth century", more so in Tokyo.

The Anime Essentials anthology by Gilles Poitras describes it as a "complex and somehow existential" anime that "pushed the envelope" of anime diversity in the 1990s, alongside the much better known contemporaries Neon Genesis Evangelion and Cowboy Bebop. Professor Susan J. Napier, in her 2003 reading to the American Philosophical Society called The Problem of Existence in Japanese Animation (published 2005), compared Serial Experiments Lain to Ghost in the Shell and Hayao Miyazaki's Spirited Away. According to her, the main characters of the two other works cross barriers; they can cross back to our world, but Lain cannot. Napier asks whether there is something to which Lain should return, "between an empty 'real' and a dark 'virtual'". Mike Toole of Anime News Network named Serial Experiments Lain as one of the most important anime of the 1990s.

Despite the positive feedback the television series had received, Anime Academy gave the series a 75%, partly due to the "lifeless" setting it had. Michael Poirier of EX magazine stated that the last three episodes fail to resolve the questions in other DVD volumes. Justin Sevakis of Anime News Network noted that the English dub was decent, but that the show relied so little on dialogue that it hardly mattered.

== Related media ==
=== Art books ===
- An Omnipresence In Wired: Hardbound, 128 pages in 96 colors with Japanese text. It features a chapter for each layer (episode) and concept sketches. It also features a short color manga titled "The Nightmare of Fabrication". It was published in 1998 by Triangle Staff/SR-12W/Pioneer LDC. (ISBN 4-7897-1343-1)
- Yoshitoshi ABe lain illustrations ab# rebuild an omnipresence in Wired: Hardbound, 148 pages. A remake of "An Omnipresence In Wired" with new art, added text by Chiaki J. Konaka, and a section entitled "ABe's EYE in color of things" (a compilation of his photos of the world). It was published in Japan on October 1, 2005, by Wanimagazine (ISBN 4-89829-487-1), and in America as a softcover version translated into English on June 27, 2006, by Digital Manga Publishing (ISBN 1-56970-899-1).
- Visual Experiments Lain: Paperback, 80 full-color pages with Japanese text. It has details on the creation, design, and storyline of the series. It was published in 1998 by Triangle Staff/Pioneer LDC. (ISBN 4-7897-1342-3)
- Scenario Experiments Lain: Paperback, 335 pages. By "chiaki j. konaka" (uncapitalized in original). It contains collected scripts with notes and small excerpted storyboards. It was published in 1998 in Japan.(ISBN 4-7897-1320-2)

=== Soundtracks ===
The first original soundtrack, Serial Experiments Lain Soundtrack, features music by Reichi Nakaido: the ending theme and part of the television series' score, alongside other songs inspired by the series. The second, Serial Experiments Lain Soundtrack: Cyberia Mix, features electronica songs inspired by the television series, including a remix of the opening theme "Duvet" by DJ Wasei. The third, lain BOOTLEG, consists of the ambient score of the series across forty-five tracks. BOOTLEG also contains a second mixed-mode data and audio disc, containing a clock program and a game, as well as an extended version of the first disc – nearly double the length – across 57 tracks in 128 kbit/s MP3 format, and sound effects from the series in WAV format. Because the word bootleg appears in its title, it is easily confused with the Sonmay counterfeit edition of itself, which only contains the first disc in an edited format. All three soundtrack albums were released by Pioneer Records.

The series' opening theme, "Duvet", was written and performed in English by the British rock band Bôa. The band released the song as a single and as part of the EP Tall Snake, which features both an acoustic version and DJ Wasei's remix from Cyberia Mix.

=== Video games ===
On November 26, 1998, Pioneer LDC released a video game with the same name as the anime for the PlayStation. It was designed by Konaka and Yasuyuki, and made to be a "network simulator" in which the player would navigate to explore Lain's story. The creators themselves did not call it a game, but "Psycho-Stretch-Ware", and it has been described as being a kind of visual novel: the gameplay is limited to unlocking pieces of information, and then reading/viewing/listening to them, with little or no puzzle needed to unlock. Lain distances itself even more from classical games by the random order in which information is collected. The aim of the authors was to let the player get the feeling that there are myriads of informations that they would have to sort through, and that they would have to do with less than what exists to understand. As with the anime, the creative team's main goal was to let the player "feel" Lain, and "to understand her problems, and to love her". A guidebook to the game called Serial Experiments Lain Official Guide (ISBN 4-07-310083-1) was released the same month by MediaWorks.

In March 2025, Team MJM announced Signal, an officially authorized occult-themed role-playing game derivative of the Serial Experiments Lain series. The game is authorized under the guidelines published by NBCUniversal Entertainment for Japanese residents to create derivative works based on the series between 2019 and 2028. It was released on May 19, 2025, for Windows and macOS via Steam and itch.io services, with a limited CD-ROM edition also planned.

== See also ==
- Noosphere
