= Hellsing Ultimate =

2001 Japanese anime series

- Also known as: Hellsing OVA
- Type: OVA
- Genre: Action; Dark fantasy; Vampire
- Based on: Hellsing
- Created by: Kouta Hirano
- Directed by: Tomokazu Tokoro (1–4); Hiroyuki Tanaka (5–7); Yasuhiro Matsumura (8, 10); Kenichi Suzuki (9–10)
- Series composition: Yōsuke Kuroda
- Screenplay by: Yōsuke Kuroda; Hideyuki Kurata
- Character designer: Ryōji Nakamori
- Music by: Hayato Matsuo
- Voices of: Jouji Nakata; Fumiko Orikasa; Yoshiko Sakakibara; Motomu Kiyokawa; Hiroaki Hirata; Norio Wakamoto; Show Hayami; Nobuo Tobita
- Ending themes: List: "Gradus Vita" by the Warsaw Philharmonic Orchestra (1, 10); "Merche Funebre" by the Warsaw Philharmonic Orchestra (2); "Letzte Bataillon" by the Warsaw Philharmonic Orchestra (3); "Das Engellandlied" by the Warsaw Philharmonic Orchestra (4); "A Patriot with No Name" (lyrics by Mami Kaida and music by Matsuo) (Note: The performer is not listed in the credits) (5); "Magnolia" by Suilen (6); "Shintō Shite" by Suilen (7); "P.S. Namu Amida Butsu" by Yasushi Ishii (8); "Sensō Suru Nara Yumi, Yari, Ken de Tatakae!!" by Yasushi Ishii (8); "Scars" by Maon Kurosaki (9)
- No. of episodes: 10

Production
- Art directors: List: Manabu Otsuzuki (1,2, 5–7); Hideto Nakahara (3); Stanislas Brunet (4); Takafumi Nishima (5–7); Hiroshi Yoshikawa (8–10)
- Sound director: Yōta Tsuruoka
- Cinematographers: List: Susumu Fukushi (1–4); Oh Seong Ha (5–7); Lee Suk Bum (5); Hisashi Goseki (6 & 7); Yoshihiro Sekiya (6 & 7); Takeo Ogiwara (8–10)
- Color designers: Hitomi Sano (1); Haruko Nobori (2–7); Eriko Murata (8–10)
- CG directors: List: Hiroshi Yagishita (1–4); Hiroshi Soma (5); Shuichi Fujinaka (5 & 6); Hiroki Ueno (6); Atsushi Taketatsu (7); Hiroshi Shirai (8 & 9); Hisayasu Kamiya (10)
- Editors: Kengo Shigemura (1–4); Satoshi Terauchi (5–7); Kiyoshi Hirose (8–10)
- Animation producers: List: Tsutomu Inamura (1, 4); Katsuya Shirai (2 & 3); Yaoki Tokashiki (4, 9 & 10); Hiroki Yoshioka (9 & 10); Hidemasa Arai (9 & 10); Masaaki Nanbe (9 & 10); Keiichi Ando (9)
- Studios: Satelight (1–4); Madhouse (5–7); Graphinica (8–10)
- Producers: List: Yasuyuki Ueda; Yoshiyuki Fudetani; Satoshi Yoshimoto (5); Yukiko Ninokata (5–7); Kentaro Hashimoto (6–7); Hiroki Yoshioka (8); Yaoki Tokashiki (8)
- Production companies: Hellsing OVA Production Committee (Note: Credited as "Wild Geese". Label consisting of various companies)
- Runtime: 42–68 minutes

Original release
- Release: February 10, 2006 – December 26, 2012

Related
- Original video animation

Hellsing: The Dawn
- Produced by: Hiroki Yoshioka
- Music by: Hayato Matsuo
- Studio: Graphinica
- Licensed by: NA: Funimation (Note: First episode only. Released with Japanese audio and English subtitles.)
- Released: July 27, 2011 – December 26, 2012
- Runtime: 6–9 minutes
- Episodes: 3

Hellsing Ultimate, known in Japan as Hellsing OVA, is a Japanese original video animation (OVA) series based on Kouta Hirano's manga series Hellsing. It follows vampire Alucard and the secret, mysterious Hellsing Organization as they battle supernatural enemies threatening England. The series consists of ten episodes animated by Satelight (1–4), Madhouse (5–7), and Graphinica (8–10), which were released between February 2006 and December 2012. Hellsing Ultimate is the second animated adaptation of Hirano's manga, following the 2001–02 television series, and, contrary to it, Hellsing Ultimate faithfully adapts the storyline of the source material.

The series was formerly licensed in North America by Geneon USA, which released the first three episodes on DVD volumes from 2006 to 2007. Funimation later acquired the series and released all the episodes from 2008 to 2014. The series was also broadcast in the United States on Adult Swim's Toonami programming in 2014. After Crunchyroll merged with Funimation, the series became available on the platform in 2022.

Hellsing Ultimate has generally been well-received, with critics praising its main character, action sequences, and character relationships, as well as its higher production values compared to the first animated adaptation. However, the series has received less favorable reviews for its inconsistent animation and slow pace throughout the episodes. Some critics have also noted that the violence could deter a general audience.

== Plot ==
The Hellsing Organization is a secret British government group tasked with concealing the existence of vampires and protecting the public from them and other supernatural threats. Hellsing employs its own army and secret weapons, including Alucard, a powerful vampire who has been controlled by Hellsing for years and serves as their exterminator. Alucard is aided by Seras Victoria, a fledgling vampire and former police officer reluctant to accept her new nature despite being a valued member of the organization. The current leader, Sir Integra Fairbrook Wingates Hellsing, is generally capable of fulfilling her duties. However, vampire activity has recently increased. The cause is Millennium, a Nazi group thought to have been destroyed over 50 years ago. They have been plotting in secret to plunge England—and possibly the world—into war.

== Cast ==
Character	Japanese voice	English voice
Hellsing Organization
Alucard	Jouji Nakata	Crispin Freeman
Seras Victoria	Fumiko Orikasa	K. T. Gray
Integra Hellsing	Yoshiko Sakakibara	Victoria Harwood
Walter C. Dornez	Motomu Kiyokawa; Daisuke Namikawa (young adult); Romi Park (young boy)	Ralph Lister; Liam O'Brien (young adult); Jessica D. Stone (young boy)
Pip Bernadotte	Hiroaki Hirata; Hiromi Igarashi (youg boy)	Yuri Lowenthal; Karen Strassman (young boy)
Iscariot
Alexander Anderson	Norio Wakamoto	Steven Brand
Enrico Maxwell	Show Hayami; Risa Hayamizu (young boy)	JB Blanc; Yuri Lowenthal (young boy)
Heinkel Wolfe	Mitsuki Saiga	Karen Strassman
Yumie Takagi	Yūko Kaida	Siobhan Flynn
Millennium
The Major	Nobuo Tobita	Gildart Jackson
Doc	Hiroshi Naka	Marcelo Tubert
Rip van Winkle	Maaya Sakamoto	Kari Wahlgren
Zorin Blitz	Yoko Soumi	Hellena Taylor (first voice); Rachel Robinson (second voice)
Schrödinger	Ryoko Shiraishi	Laura Bailey
Tubalcain Alhambra	Hōchū Ōtsuka	Steve Wilcox
Luke Valentine	Takehito Koyasu	Patrick Seitz
Jan Valentine	Wataru Takagi	Josh Phillips

== Production and release ==
In April 2005, it was announced that a new original video animation (OVA) adaptation of the Hellsing manga, more faithful to the source material than the 2001–02 television series, would be released by Geneon Entertainment in Japan and North America. Manga author Kouta Hirano was approached by producer Yasuyuki Ueda for the new project. Ueda commented that the staff involved in the OVA were huge fans of the original work, so he did not perceive any intention to change it too much in the adaptation. Hirano participated in the casting audition. Although Hirano said he would only be involved in a few aspects and that he trusted the staff, Ueda pointed out that Hirano knew more than he let on and admitted to being impressed by his knowledge of animation. Ueda opted for an OVA format rather than a television series to avoid time constraints. As a fan of the manga, he wanted to thoroughly adapt the source material and believed an OVA offered greater creative freedom. Writer Yōsuke Kuroda agreed to collaborate on the project. Ueda noted that while combining CG with traditional animation was time-consuming, the OVA schedule allowed them to use CG for realistic depictions of weapons and gunfire.

The first four episodes were animated by Satelight and directed by Tomokazu Tokoro; they were released from February 10, 2006, to February 22, 2008. The three following episodes (5–7) were animated by Madhouse and directed by Hiroyuki Tanaka; they were released from November 21, 2008, to December 23, 2009. The three last episodes (8–10) were animated by Graphinica, and directed by Yasuhiro Matsumura (8, 10) and Kenichi Suzuki (9 and 10); they were released from July 27, 2011, to December 26, 2012. Each limited edition of the last three episodes' home video release included an episode of Hellsing: The Dawn.

=== International release ===
In North America, Geneon USA released the first three episodes from December 5, 2006, to October 16, 2007. Geneon announced that it would stop self-distribution of its titles in 2007. The first two episodes were broadcast on Starz Edge's Animidnight programming block on February 12, 2008; Episodes 3 and 4 were announced to air; however, the fourth episode was not ready with an English-language track, and it was not broadcast. In 2008, Funimation announced that it would distribute select Geneon titles, and re-released the first three episodes of Hellsing Ultimate on September 16 of the same year, along with the fourth episode on September 23. In 2010, Funimation announced that it had licensed Episodes 5–7; in 2011, Funimation announced that it had licensed Episode 8 as well. Funimation re-released the first four episodes on DVD and Blu-ray Disc volumes on October 30, 2012, while Episodes 5–8 were released on the same formats on November 13 of the same year. The second volume included the first episode of Hellsing: The Dawn in Japanese with English subtitles; Funimation later confirmed that it would not release the remaining two episodes. Episodes 9 and 10 were released on October 28, 2014. The series was broadcast on Adult Swim's Toonami programming block from September 13 to December 13, 2014. Funimation released all the episodes on a Complete Collection Blu-ray Disc volume on June 4, 2019. After Funimation was unified under the Crunchyroll brand, the series moved to the platform in 2022.

In the United Kingdom, the series was licensed by Manga Entertainment. The first two episodes were released together on a single DVD on October 13, 2008. Episodes 3 and 4 were released on January 26 and April 6, 2009, respectively. A DVD and Blu-ray box set collecting the first four episodes was released on July 29, 2013, and a second volume for the same formats, collecting Episodes 5–8, was released on May 20 of the same year. The Complete Collection DVD and Blu-ray volume was released on July 1, 2019. A DVD and Blu-ray volume collecting Episodes 9 and 10 was released on May 4, 2020. In Australia and New Zealand, the series was licensed by Madman Entertainment. The first four episodes were released on DVD from April 4, 2007, to December 3, 2008. A DVD and Blu-ray volume containing the first four episodes was released on February 20, 2013; a second volume, collecting Episodes 5–8, was released on March 20 of the same year; and a third volume, collecting episodes 9 and 10, was released on November 26, 2014.

== Music ==
The music of Hellsing Ultimate was composed by Hayato Matsuo. The series features ten musical pieces as ending themes. The ending theme for Episodes 1 and 10 is "Gradus Vita", composed by Matsuo and performed by the Warsaw Philharmonic Orchestra. The ending theme for Episode 2 is "Merche Funebre", composed by Matsuo and performed by the Warsaw Philharmonic Orchestra. The ending theme for Episode 3 is "Letzte Bataillon", composed by Matsuo, and performed by the Warsaw Philharmonic Orchestra. The ending theme for Episode 4 is "Das Engellandlied", composed by Herms Niel, with lyrics by Hermann Löns, arranged by Matsuo and performed by the Warsaw Philharmonic Orchestra. The ending theme for Episode 5 is "A Patriot with No Name", with lyrics by Mami Kaida, and music by Matsuo. The ending theme for Episode 6 is "Magnolia", performed by Suilen. The ending theme for Episode 7 is "Shintō Shite" (浸透して; lit. 'Sink In'), performed by Suilen. The ending themes for Episode 8 are "P.S. Namu Amida Butsu" (P.S.南無阿弥陀仏) and "Sensō Suru Nara Yumi, Yari, Ken de Tatakae!!" (戦争するなら弓、槍、剣で戦え!; lit. 'If You're Going to Wage War, Fight With Bows, Spears, and Swords!'), both performed by Yasushi Ishii. The ending theme for Episode 9 is "Scars", written and performed by Maon Kurosaki and composed and arranged by RON.

Episode 5 features two insert songs: "Broken English", composed by Marianne Faithfull and performed by Schaft, and "Akuma Stocking" (悪魔巣取金愚, Akuma Sutokkingu), with lyrics and music by Teruyuki Takahashi, and arranged and performed by Tokusatsu. Episode 7 features the insert song "Zakuro" (柘榴; lit. 'Pomegranate'), performed by Suilen.

A special CD, titled Warsaw Recording Selection, was released with the limited edition of the fourth episode on February 22, 2008. An original soundtrack album, titled Black Dog, was released on March 21, 2008; A special CD, titled Nazi CD, was released with the limited edition of the first Blu-ray box set on October 22, 2010. A special CD, titled Somehow, Iscariote, was released with the limited edition of the second Blu-ray box set on April 1, 2015.

== Episodes ==
No.	Title	Runtime	Original release date	English release
1	"Hellsing I"	51 minutes	February 10, 2006	December 5, 2006
Ten years prior, young Integra Hellsing becomes head of the Hellsing Organization after her father Arthur's death. Her jealous uncle Richard Hellsing attempts to kill her, awakening the dormant Alucard, who kills Richard's men. Integra shoots and kills her uncle, becoming the last descendant of the Hellsing bloodline. Alucard pledges allegiance to Integra and becomes her loyal servant. In present-day England, Alucard is called to eradicate a vampire priest and his ghouls. A young policewoman named Seras Victoria, responding to the disturbance, is gravely injured; given the choice to live or die, she accepts, and Alucard turns her into his vampire servant. Later, on a mission to hunt a vampire in the town of Badrick in Northern Ireland, Alucard meets and fights Father Alexander Anderson for the first time.
2	"Hellsing II"	43 minutes	August 25, 2006	June 12, 2007
Alucard dreams of his defeat at the hands of Abraham Van Helsing. While Sir Integra holds a round table conference to report her findings on the current wave of vampire attacks, vampire brothers Jan and Luke Valentine launch a covert sneak attack on the Hellsing compound with the help of a ghoul army outfitted with military gear and small arms. Almost all Hellsing soldiers are killed and turned into ghouls before Alucard, Seras and Walter C. Dornez (who demonstrates why he was once known as the "Angel of Death") turn the tide. Jan reveals the name of the group responsible for the attack as Millennium. Integra hints to Walter that surviving Nazi officials could be responsible.
3	"Hellsing III"	47 minutes	April 4, 2007	October 16, 2007
To increase manpower following the devastating attack on Hellsing headquarters, Walter recruits the mercenary group Wild Geese and integrates them into Hellsing's security forces. Integra receives information from Enrico Maxwell, the fanatical leader of Iscariot, confirming her suspicions about Millennium's origins. She deploys Alucard, Seras and Pip Bernadotte, leader of the Wild Geese, to Rio de Janeiro, Brazil to locate Millennium. Alucard and Seras are later attacked by BOPE units of the Brazilian military police after being publicly declared international terrorists, a ruse perpetrated by Brazilian officials in exchange for immortality promised by Millennium. After receiving orders from Integra, Alucard massacres the BOPE officers and faces off against Millennium officer Tubalcain Alhambra.
4	"Hellsing IV"	56 minutes	February 22, 2008	September 23, 2008
As Hellsing and Iscariot meet with the Queen of the United Kingdom, their conference is interrupted by a message from the Major, transmitted live via the ubiquitous Schrödinger, declaring his intention to wage war on England; Alucard then shoots Schrödinger. Meanwhile, a VTOL aircraft carrier called the Eagle is hijacked by First Lieutenant Rip van Winkle and a small squadron of SS soldiers from Millennium. Integra sends Alucard aboard an SR-71 to deal with the perpetrators; he ruthlessly kills them all and turns Rip Van Winkle into one of his many familiars, while the Major begins moving to London to drive England into another war.
5	"Hellsing V"	44 minutes	November 21, 2008	November 13, 2012
While Alucard remains trapped on the Eagle, Millennium begins attacking London. Zorin Blitz is ordered to head toward Hellsing HQ with a small group of soldiers, while the rest of the vampires attack London, killing thousands of civilians and attempting to capture Integra. She escapes the vampire SS soldiers only after Walter sacrifices himself to hold them off; however, Walter is himself captured by the Captain. When the vampire soldiers corner her, she is saved and later captured by a large group of pistol-wielding Iscariot priests led by Anderson, Heinkel Wolfe and Yumie Takagi. After the credits, Alucard uses his powers to steer the Eagle towards London.
6	"Hellsing VI"	42 minutes	July 24, 2009	November 13, 2012
As the battle commences, Maxwell, head of Section XIII Iscariot, receives a major promotion at the Vatican and begins mobilizing the Vatican's fighters. Meanwhile, in the heart of London, while Integra convinces the Iscariot members to escort her home, the Hellsing Mansion is besieged by Zorin Blitz and her forces. The only line of defense against this assault is Captain Bernadotte, his Wild Geese, and Seras. As the battle rages, they must deal with the resilient vampire Nazi forces as well as Zorin's mysterious power of illusion, which nearly destroys the Geese from within. Seras's quick thinking frees them from Zorin's grip, but the battle is not over. After an attempted stolen kiss, the group splits up, Seras in one direction and the Geese in another, but not before promising each other they will come out alive.
7	"Hellsing VII"	45 minutes	December 23, 2009	November 13, 2012
While Seras successfully overcomes Zorin's soldiers, Bernadotte and his forces are slaughtered. Seras comes to their rescue and destroys most of Zorin's forces. Zorin then delves deep into Seras's memories, forcing her to relive her painful childhood, in which she watched her parents be murdered by gangsters and her mother's corpse be raped after Seras was shot by one of the robbers. While Seras is trapped in the illusion, Zorin hacks off her arm, stabs her through the back and cuts her eyes. Bernadotte tries to escape with the badly wounded Seras, but Zorin stabs him through the back. He kisses Seras in his agony, then tells her to bite him. Tearfully, she does so, healing most of her wounds except her left arm, which spews shadow matter. Seras destroys all of Zorin's forces, then attacks and kills Zorin. Seras leaves the mansion and heads off to destroy the remaining vampires and ghouls in the city, as Vatican forces loom on the horizon.
8	"Hellsing VIII"	49 minutes	July 27, 2011	November 13, 2012
The Vatican forces led by Maxwell begin attacking the remaining Millennium forces along with the surviving citizens of London. Walter, now a vampire, joins forces with the Major. Anderson is enraged because he believes Maxwell has become drunk with power and is abusing God's power. The armed priests led by Heinkel Wolfe and Yumie Takagi come close to capturing Integra, but Seras saves her. Alucard, standing atop the Eagle as it floats down the Thames, returns to London and joins the battle, encountering the two other trump cards, Anderson and the Captain. Integra releases his Control Art Restriction to Level Zero, allowing Alucard to summon millions of familiars to the battle. Maxwell and Anderson realize that Alucard is in fact Count Dracula (Vlad the Impaler), the first vampire. Alucard's forces easily overwhelm all of the Iscariot and Millennium forces, and Maxwell is killed shortly after. Alucard meets up with Integra and Seras. Anderson and Alucard fight each other, but Alucard has the upper hand, and the remaining priests come to aid Anderson against Alucard. Anderson uses Helena's Nail to become a monster against Alucard, setting him and his familiars ablaze.
9	"Hellsing IX"	48 minutes	February 15, 2012	October 28, 2014
A dying Alucard envisions his past as Vlad the Impaler, recalling his childhood rape by the Ottoman Sultan and his war against the Turks, during which he tells his knights that praying to God is pointless unless one works for one's prayer. Carried off to execution, he drinks the blood of the battlefield and becomes a vampire. He awakens to Seras pleading with him as he fights Priest Anderson, whose heart he rips out and crushes, removing Helena's Nail; the priest hears children laughing and says a final "Amen" before dying. Walter appears, crushes Anderson's remains, kills Yumie and declares himself the Angel of Death; Heinkel is shot by the Captain but spared. Alucard and Walter fight while Integra and Seras are invited aboard the Major's zeppelin. Walter, growing unstable from vampirization, pierces Alucard's heart with a pipe, but the body is a decoy; Alucard appears behind him and punches him, regressing his body to the young boy of 60 years ago. Alucard reveals himself in the form of the girl he assumed during the war, calling Walter a child unchanged in 60 years.
10	"Hellsing X"	68 minutes	December 26, 2012	October 28, 2014
Integra and Seras board the zeppelin, where Schrödinger greets them before being shot again; the two battle Millennium's remnants until the Captain intercepts them, and Seras stays to fight while Integra proceeds. Outside, Alucard absorbs the rivers of blood from the dead, a moment the Major planned for to defeat him. Seras struggles against the Captain, revealed as a werewolf, but Bernadotte, her familiar, uses a silver tooth to slay him. Integra reaches the Major, but a shield blocks her attack, leaving both to witness Alucard's defeat. Schrödinger decapitates himself atop Big Ben and is absorbed while the Major explains his omnipresence: Schrödinger lives while self-aware, but the millions of lives within Alucard's blood negate that awareness, and the negation spreads to Alucard, forcing him to disappear. Seras rejoins Integra; Walter, attacked by Heinkel, escapes into the zeppelin. Seras pierces the shield and damages the Major, revealed as a cyborg; the shootout kills him and blinds Integra's left eye. Walter kills the Doctor before dying. Integra orders Seras to bring them home. Thirty years later, Iscariot visits the new Hellsing headquarters but is turned away, while Heinkel and the new chief Makube contemplate the next Crusade. That night, Alucard reappears at the older Integra's bedside, explaining that the lives within him clouded his awareness; he killed all but one, alluding to Schrödinger. Integra offers her blood to the starving vampire and accepts his return.

== Reception ==
In his review of the first episode, Zac Bertschy of Anime News Network (ANN) noted its faithfulness to Hirano's manga, in contrast to the earlier television series adaptation. Bertschy also mentioned that it was darker and bloodier, though he felt that the plot was disjointed in places and might confuse newcomers. Bertschy found the animation to be uneven yet effective in action sequences, and he considered the soundtrack to be weaker than that of the TV series. He also praised the English dub. Tasha Robinson of Sci Fi Weekly wrote that the OVA had improved visuals compared to the earlier TV series, but commented that the story was reduced to its core. She found the characters to be less deep than in the TV series and described the OVA as being like reading CliffsNotes. She also wrote that the dialogue was compressed into brief exposition. Nevertheless, Robinson deemed it suitable for action fans seeking a violent vampire spectacle, recommending that newcomers watch the full TV series as well.

Reviewing the first four episodes, Serdar Yegulalp of About.com noted its high production values. He wrote that the OVA was almost all style and little story, which he found effective, but criticized the near-invincibility of Alucard for removing tension from battles and the lack of morally good characters. He also criticized the use of Nazis as stock villains. Carl Kimlinger of ANN wrote that the series appeals to a particular audience and escalates its mayhem throughout. He found the first episode to be choppy and unfocused. However, he considered later episodes to be increasingly confident and effective. Kimlinger praised the action in the third and fourth episodes, particularly Alucard's battles, and he called the English dub fantastic. However, he noted that the series's absurdity and irreverence would limit its appeal.

Reviewing Episodes 9 and 10, Sheena McNeil of Sequential Tart wrote that the final two episodes effectively wrapped up the series's loose ends and main characters while revealing the underlying battle strategies. McNeil described the conclusion of Alucard's fight with Anderson as gripping. She also found the plot twists concerning the Major and Walter to be unexpected. However, she considered Walter's encounter with Alucard to be anticlimactic. McNeil praised Seras's character development and the series's explanation of its vampire mythology. She concluded that it was a "wonderful conclusion". Jacob Chapman of ANN wrote that the last two episodes suffered from low production values due to a studio change, stating that they feature minimal animation and excessive padding in the form of redundant monologues. However, he noted that the ending clarified the confusing conclusion of the manga and developed the characters more fully. Chapman praised the score and voice performances, considering the Integra–Alucard relationship to be the strongest aspect of the series. He called the finale hollow but worthwhile. Writing for the same website, Bamboo Dong said that the final two episodes felt like a resigned fulfillment of a promise rather than a grand finale. She found the characters' motivations to be inconsistent, the dialogue to be weaker than in earlier episodes, and the fight scenes to rely heavily on animated blood. She noted that the Major's monologues and Gildart Jackson's vocal performance remained entertaining but considered the finale exhausting, recommending keeping expectations low.

Reviewing the full series, Aiden Foote of THEM Anime Reviews noted the way it mixes serious themes with unrestrained spectacle. He called Alucard callous and bloodthirsty, yet stylish, and deemed Seras the most human and central character in the series. However, he felt that her moral conflict seemed insincere. Foote noted that the villains' clear motivations gave weight to the action and praised the animation, visuals, and music. However, he criticized the slow pacing and uneven comic relief. In her review of Funimation's The Complete Collection volume, Brittany Vincent of Otaku USA offered a positive assessment of the OVA. Vincent wrote that Alucard serves as the central psychopathic character and that Seras provides a more human perspective, balancing the series's tone. Vincent found the animation and action scenes effective and concluded that the OVA surpassed the earlier TV series adaptation in every respect.

In a retrospective review ten years after its release, Darius Washington of The Fandom Post wrote that Hellsing Ultimate was a significant improvement over the TV series. Washington noted its higher production values, more extreme fight scenes, and better animation. He also praised Crispin Freeman's performance as Alucard and the orchestral score. He also noted that the series developed Seras through her interactions with Pip's soldiers. Washington considered the OVA to be the definitive adaptation of the manga, but he found some monologues and exposition to be unnecessarily long, and the large cast of factions to be occasionally confusing. Writing for the same website, Skyler Allen described Hellsing Ultimate as irreverent, over-the-top, and gory, calling it "schlocky" in a positive sense, emphasizing that its goal is to provide a "bloody good time". He found the first episode to be the weakest of the ten, but still considered it an adequate setup. Allen said the extreme violence was difficult to take seriously. He praised Alucard's screen presence, as well as the voice acting in both the Japanese and English versions. He considered the relationship between Seras and Pip to be among the series's best examples of character development. Allen also noted its escalating spectacle and cited a content warning for sexual assault in the fifth episode.

In a 2024 review, Lynzee Loveridge of ANN wrote that the OVA provided the canonical animated ending that the TV series lacked, and it remains a progenitor of ultra-violent anime. Loveridge found the series consistently engaging across its ten episodes, but she also noted that it had not aged well, citing uneven early animation and sound mixing, casual sexism, and stale sexual assault jokes centered on Seras as reasons for its decline. Loveridge also considered the Nazi villains to be an uncomfortable element, concluding that the series would likely be too much for modern audiences. Reviewing the series 20 years after its debut, Debopriyaa Dutta of Polygon wrote that Hellsing Ultimate brought the manga's uncompromising vision and violence to life. She noted that the OVA preserved the thematic nuances about the duality between humans and monsters, including the characters Alucard, the Major, and Walter. Dutta expressed that the TV series lost these nuances because it was produced before the manga ended. Dutta considered the TV series's soundtrack the OVA's only drawback and wrote that Hellsing Ultimate's emphasis on style over substance remained faithful to its source.
