= Hellsing (TV series) =

2001 Japanese anime series

- Type: TV series
- Genre: Action; Dark fantasy; Vampire
- Based on: Hellsing
- Created by: Kouta Hirano
- Directed by: Umanosuke Iida (chief); Yasunori Urata
- Series composition: Chiaki J. Konaka
- Character designer: Toshiharu Murata
- Music by: Yasushi Ishii
- Voices of: Jouji Nakata; Fumiko Orikasa; Yoshiko Sakakibara; Motomu Kiyokawa; Nachi Nozawa; Unshō Ishizuka; Takumi Yamazaki
- Opening theme: "Logos Naki World" by Yasushi Ishii
- Ending theme: "Shine" by Mr. Big
- No. of episodes: 13

Production
- Art director: Shinji Katahira
- Sound director: Yōta Tsuruoka
- Cinematographer: Atsushi Takeyama
- Color designer: Keiko Kai
- Editor: Kengo Shigemura
- Studios: Gonzo; Digimation
- Producer: Daisuke Kawakami
- Production company: Hellsing Production Committee: Fuji Television; Geneon Entertainment; Gonzo
- Runtime: 23 minutes

Original release
- Network: Fuji TV
- Release: October 11, 2001 – January 17, 2002

Hellsing is a Japanese anime television series based on Kouta Hirano's manga series Hellsing. It was animated by Gonzo and Digimation and broadcast for 13 episodes on Fuji TV from October 2001 to January 2002. The series follows vampire Alucard and the secret, mysterious Hellsing Organization as they battle supernatural enemies threatening England. Although the anime features the setting and characters from the manga, it follows an original storyline.

The series was formerly licensed in North America by Geneon USA, which released it on DVD volumes from 2002 to 2003. Funimation later acquired the series and released it on DVD in 2012. After Crunchyroll merged with Funimation, the series became available on the platform in 2022.

The series received mixed response. While critics have praised the protagonist, setting, and dark tone, they have criticized the animation quality, characterizations, and its conclusion. A second animated adaptation, Hellsing Ultimate, was released as an original video animation (OVA) series from 2006 to 2012.

== Plot ==
For generations, the Hellsing Organization has protected the British Empire from vampires and other supernatural threats. Sir Integra Fairbrook Wingates Hellsing, the leader of the organization, recruited the vampire Alucard as their trump card. After a policewoman named Seras Victoria is left mortally wounded in an incident, Alucard drinks her blood, turning her into a vampire and his assistant.

The Hellsing Organization is tasked with addressing numerous occurrences, including vampire-related disturbances within the country and conflicts with the Vatican's Iscariot Organization. Due to a traitor within the group, Alucard and his team are facing a dire situation and must confront their ultimate enemy, Incognito.

== Cast ==
| Character | Japanese voice | English voice |
|---|---|---|
| Alucard | Jouji Nakata | Crispin Freeman |
| Seras Victoria | Fumiko Orikasa | K. T. Gray |
| Integra Hellsing | Yoshiko Sakakibara | Victoria Harwood |
| Walter C. Dornez | Motomu Kiyokawa | Ralph Lister |
| Alexander Anderson | Nachi Nozawa | Steven Brand |
| Peter Fargason | Unshō Ishizuka | Bill Morgan |
| Incognito | Takumi Yamazaki | Isaac C. Singleton Jr. |

== Broadcast and release ==
Hellsing was directed by Yasunori Urata, under the chief direction of Umanosuke Iida, and written by Chiaki J. Konaka. Although the series uses the same characters and settings as the source manga, it follows an original storyline. It was broadcast for 13 episodes on Fuji TV from October 11, 2001, to January 17, 2002. (Note: Fuji TV listed the series air dates on Wednesday as 26:25, which is effectively Thursday at 2:25 a.m. JST.)

In North America, the series was first licensed by Pioneer Entertainment (later Geneon USA). Four DVD sets were released between July 23, 2002, and January 21, 2003. The series was broadcast in the United States on Starz!'s Encore Action channel, as part of its Animidnight late night programming block, starting in October 2003. The series was later acquired by Funimation in 2010; it released the entire series on DVD on November 13, 2012. After Funimation was unified under the Crunchyroll brand, the series moved to the platform in 2022.

In the United Kingdom, the series was first licensed by ADV Films, who released it in four DVDs from July 21, 2003, to January 19, 2004. Manga Entertainment later licensed the series and released it on a four-disc box set on August 12, 2013. In Australia and New Zealand, the series was licensed by Madman Entertainment, who released four DVDs from November 13, 2002, and February 11, 2003.

== Music ==
The series's score was composed by Yasushi Ishii. Two soundtrack CDs were released: Raid on November 22, 2001, and Ruins on February 22, 2002. In North America, both CDs were released on July 1 and September 2, 2003, respectively. The series's opening theme song is "Logos Naki World" (ロゴスなきワールド, Rogosu Naki Wārudo; lit. 'A World Without Logos'), performed by Yasushi Ishii, and the ending theme song is "Shine", performed by Mr. Big.

== Episodes ==
| No. | Title | Original release date | English air date |
|---|---|---|---|
| 1 | "The Undead" | October 11, 2001 | October 4, 2003 |
After hearing reports of people going missing in the village of Cheddar, Integra Hellsing takes command of a small Hellsing unit. After several deaths occurred during the investigation by D11 teams, Alucard is deployed. Seras Victoria, a female D11 operator, fights her ex-D11 colleagues who have turned into ghouls. Alucard eliminates the ghouls and their master, a vampiric priest. However, Seras is critically wounded in the gunfight, so Alucard turns her into a vampire to save her life.
| 2 | "Club M" | October 18, 2001 | October 11, 2003 |
Seras Victoria struggles to accept that her life as a D-11 officer is over and that she is now a vampire. However, her thoughts are interrupted when she, Alucard, and a unit of Hellsing commandos are deployed to track down and kill two teenage vampires who murder families with small guns. Seras experiences a crisis of conscience when ordered to kill one of the culprits.
| 3 | "Sword Dancer" | October 25, 2001 | October 18, 2003 |
Hellsing Intelligence reports that a mysterious computer chip implanted in a person can turn them into a vampire. A deceased foreign college student comes back to life after the chip is removed. After armed policemen are killed in the morgue, Seras joins a Hellsing paramilitary squad to take the student out. A Vatican priest named Alexander Anderson appears and kills the entire squad before incapacitating Seras. Alucard then comes to save her life.
| 4 | "Innocent as a Human" | November 1, 2001 | October 25, 2003 |
A snuff film featuring a man being killed by a vampire on screen also has a Hellsing soldier in the background. This forces Integra to deploy Hellsing and Seras to investigate the film, find those responsible for broadcasting it, and stop further snuff film broadcasting before widespread curiosity about the Hellsing Organization is incited.
| 5 | "Brotherhood" | November 8, 2001 | November 1, 2003 |
After reports of a supposed cult emerge, Seras and a team of Hellsing commandos raid a warehouse district, where they find a dead vampire and a bomb trap intended to reduce their manpower. Meanwhile, Integra attends a covert meeting with the secretive government organization, the Round Table, when two vampire brothers, Luke and Jan Valentine, launch a surprise attack on the Hellsing mansion with a large army of ghouls armed with guns and shields. Hellsing soldiers, along with Alucard, Seras, and Walter, fight off the vampire hordes as they overwhelm the mansion.
| 6 | "Dead Zone" | November 15, 2001 | November 8, 2003 |
Despite having the deceased Hellsing commandos rise as ghouls to add to their ranks, Alucard, Seras, and Walter continue to fight the Valentine Brothers. Luke fights Alucard, who defeats him. Meanwhile, Seras and Walter eliminate the other ghoul soldiers. Jan faces Integra and the Round Table, but he commits suicide after Integra shoots him with mercury-filled bullets.
| 7 | "Duel" | November 22, 2001 | November 15, 2003 |
After being forced to euthanize the dying Hellsing commando ghouls, Integra attends the funeral of her deceased subordinates. While she and Walter try to figure out how to increase their manpower, Enrico Maxwell invites Integra to meet him at a museum. Meanwhile, Seras Victoria and a Hellsing squad led by Mason Fox battle a vampire who has turned civilians in the London Underground into ghouls. Alexander appears again, killing the vampire and several Hellsing soldiers before Alucard intervenes.
| 8 | "Kill House" | November 29, 2001 | November 22, 2003 |
A Hong Kong factory manufacturing Freak chips was destroyed after Royal Hong Kong Police officers raided it. Due to their issues with the Freak chips, Integra and Walter are forced to train new recruits from non-British special forces personnel instead of British special units such as the SAS and D-11 in order to maintain the manpower of the Hellsing security forces. Meanwhile, Seras and an MI-5 secret agent investigate the rise in cases involving Freak vampires on their own.
| 9 | "Red Rose Vertigo" | December 6, 2001 | November 29, 2003 |
While several Hellsing squads were raiding a castle, the Special Air Service (SAS)'s 22nd Regiment arrive in their Counter Revolutionary Warfare (CRW) gear and order the squads to pull back. Seras could not shake the feeling that something was wrong about the SAS's sudden arrival. Laura, Integra's "sister", arrives, but Seras and Alucard discover that something is wrong when they find out that she is a Baobh-shìth trying to assassinate Integra. Meanwhile, an unknown party had converted the SAS squads in the castle into monsters.
| 10 | "Master of Monster" | December 13, 2001 | December 6, 2003 |
During the emergency operation to save Integra after she stabbed herself to avoid being turned into a vampire, she reflects on how she met Alucard and their history before she took command of the Hellsing Organization.
| 11 | "Transcend Force" | December 20, 2001 | December 13, 2003 |
Upon hearing about the Queen's secret visit to Hellsing HQ and the Round Table meeting, Integra secretly ordered the deployment of Hellsing commandos to the Tower of London to mislead her enemies.
| 12 | "Total Destruction" | January 10, 2002 | December 20, 2003 |
Integra learns that the Hellsing commandos at the Tower of London were under attack by assassins in CRW uniforms from the SAS's 22nd Regiment. Despite the odds, some of the surviving Hellsing commandos—Alucard and Seras—team up to fight back. They are revealed to have been turned into a different kind of Freak vampire. The entire Hellsing Organization was declared armed terrorists, and the British Army arrived to quell the Hellsing soldiers and eliminate the Freaks in the Tower of London.
| 13 | "Hellfire" | January 17, 2002 | December 27, 2003 |
In the Tower of London, Alucard faces an undead named Incognito. Meanwhile, Integra and Walter try to head out there but encounter trouble from the British Army. Despite being overwhelmed by Incognito, Alucard manages to defeat him.

== Reception ==
In his review for Anime News Network, Zac Bertschy stated that Hellsing adhered more closely to traditional vampire lore than earlier series like Vampire Princess Miyu and Vampire Hunter D: Bloodlust. He described the premise as simple and the character interactions well written, calling the series unusually character-driven for a horror work. Bertschy criticized the inconsistent animation by Gonzo after the first episode and noted that later episodes diverged from the manga into an original storyline, despite finding the series enjoyable overall. In another review of the series finale, Bertschy described the concluding episodes as unsatisfying and criticized the characters' inconsistent actions. In her review of the series for the same website, Bamboo Dong described it as highly entertaining, despite its decline in quality toward the end. She compared its tone to a blend of dark, gothic elements and light jazz, as exemplified by the opening theme. She noted that the animation started out strong but deteriorated as the series went on, though she added that this did not diminish the value of the first half. Dong concluded that viewers had little to lose by watching it.

Chris Beveridge of AnimeOnDVD gave the series a positive review, deeming it stylish. He praised the English setting, the Vatican subplot, and the dub's accents. However, he preferred Nakata's Japanese performance as Alucard to Freeman's. Beveridge concluded that the series would not appeal to everyone due to its violence and sexual content, but appreciated its serious treatment of adult themes. In a review on the same website, Paul Grisham called Hellsing a "less-than-average vampire drama" and said it favored an X-Files–style secret-organization premise over the genre's metaphorical potential. Grisham praised the series for its protagonist, its portrayal of adult sexuality and its varied, blues-influenced score. However, he criticized the religious conspiracy plot as implausible, and Victoria's design as inconsistent, arguing as well that her early conversion diminished sympathy. He also criticized the English dub as unconvincing. He concluded that the series might appeal to viewers seeking mindless violence.

Jason Bustard of THEM Anime Reviews described Hellsing as a dark series, free of common anime conventions, and said that Alucard is an antihero that viewers cannot help but root for. Bustard praised the detailed attention to weapons and vehicles, as well as the rendering of London locations. He concluded that, though its graphic content and sexual material do not make it suitable for a general audience, the series offers strong atmosphere, cool characters, and abundant action. Tasha Robinson of Sci Fi Weekly compared the visuals of the series to those of Trigun and Vampire Hunter D: Bloodlust. She described Alucard as a stylish yet menacing figure and praised Gonzo's expressive animation. Robinson highlighted the contrast between Integra and Seras as a source of sympathy in the dark setting. She also noted the fast pace, despite the occasional extended dialogue, and observed that the varied accents in the dub gave the series an international character. Writing for Anime Jump, Dave Merrill identified vampire hunter Alexander Anderson as the most entertaining character in the series. Merrill criticized Seras as ineffectual and poorly drawn and said the animation quality fluctuated between impressive and amateurish. He concluded that the series had potential, but inconsistent production values and a script that underused its concepts undermined it.

The Encyclopedia of Science Fiction found Hellsing enjoyable and exciting, praising its characterization and its respect for traditional vampire lore, particularly the contrast between the supernatural powers of established vampires and the technological abilities of their modern counterparts. However, it criticized the occasionally inconsistent animation and the unresolved major plot threads, especially the identity and motivations of the artificial vampires' creators. The encyclopedia partly attributed these shortcomings to the adaptation predating the manga's completion, which produced a divergent final, and noted that the later OVA series Hellsing Ultimate followed the manga more closely.
