= Yasushi Ishii =

Yasushi Ishii 石井 妥師
- Born: 石井 妥師 (Ishii Yasushi); 10 March 1970 (age 56)
- Origin: Utsunomiya, Tochigi Prefecture, Japan
- Genres: Experimental; jazz fusion; hard rock
- Occupations: Singer, songwriter, voice actor
- Years active: 1991–present
- Label: Epic Records Japan
- Website: http://yasushi-ishii.com/

Yasushi Ishii (石井 妥師, Ishii Yasushi; born 10 March 1970) is a Japanese musician from Utsunomiya, Tochigi Prefecture, Japan. He specializes in experimental, jazz fusion and hard rock. He is famous for his work with anime scores. He composed music for and scored the first Hellsing anime, with the music released as two separate soundtracks. He also was the voice for the Intelligencer in the video game Chaos Legion.

In 1991, he debuted as a composer for Epic Records Japan, and started composing music for Misato Watanabe, Takashi Utsunomiya, and went on tour with the band T.utu with the Band. It was at this time that Ishii changed how he wrote his given name from (恭史) to (妥師), though the pronunciation stayed the same. In 1994, T.utu put out their first album, and Utsunomiya, as one of the members of the former members of T.utu, split off into another band named Boyo-Bozo which Ishii also helped compose music for. After Boyo-Bozo broke up, Ishii composed music for a number of other artists including Lazy Knack, Tomoe Shinohara, Masayuki Suzuki, and V6. He also helped produce Naoto Kine's album Liquid Sun, Crystal Kay's first album C.L.L～Crystal Lover Light, and Daisuke Asakura's Siren's Melody single. He also composed the soundtrack for Darker than Black: Origins OVA. In 2012 both he and Hayato Matsuo composed the music for the short anime adaptation of Drifters, a manga series by Hellsing creator Kouta Hirano, this was included as part of the Hellsing: The Dawn OVA series showing up at the end of the final episode and lasting only 150 seconds, later on he composed music for the 2016 anime television series adaptation of Drifters. He maintains a blog since 2007 where he shares new compositions on a monthly basis - some of which (SKY WALKER, BLUES OF FOREVER) are new renditions of songs from his work on Hellsing.

== Discography ==
- Hellsing OST
- REVOLUTION (2008)
- MINI-ALBUM (2009)
- Darker than Black: Origins
- Drifters
