= Drifters (manga) =

Japanese manga series

- First tankōbon volume cover

ドリフターズ (Dorifutāzu)
- Genre: Adventure; Dark fantasy; Isekai
- Manga
- Written by: Kouta Hirano
- Published by: Shōnen Gahosha
- English publisher: NA / UK: Dark Horse Comics
- Imprint: Young King Comics
- Magazine: Young King OURs
- Original run: April 30, 2009 – present
- Volumes: 7
- Original video animation

Drifters: Special Edition
- Studio: Hoods Drifters Studio
- Released: June 6, 2016
- Runtime: 36 minutes
- Anime television series
- Directed by: Kenichi Suzuki (TV, OVA 1–2); Hitomi Ezoe (OVA 3) (Note: Credited as Animation Director (アニメーション監督). Note: despite the inference, this credit refers to series directorial duties, rather than the animation director (作画監督) duties associated with the animation production pipeline.)
- Produced by: Yasuyuki Ueda; Yoshiyuki Fudetani
- Written by: Hideyuki Kurata
- Music by: Yasushi Ishii; Hayato Matsuo
- Studio: Hoods Drifters Studio
- Licensed by: AUS: Universal/Sony; NA: Funimation; UK: Universal Pictures UK (home video)
- Original network: Tokyo MX, GYT, KBS, MBC, GBS
- Original run: October 7, 2016 – November 30, 2018
- Episodes: 12 + 3 OVAs
- icon

Drifters (Japanese: ドリフターズ, Hepburn: Dorifutāzu) is a Japanese manga series written and illustrated by Kouta Hirano. It started serialization in Shōnen Gahosha's magazine Young King Ours in April 2009. The series focuses on various historical figures summoned to an unknown world where their skills and techniques are needed by magicians in order to save their world from total destruction. A 12-episode anime television series adaptation aired between October and December 2016; three additional original video animation (OVA) episodes were released from December 2017 to November 2018.

== Synopsis ==
Shimazu Toyohisa, while involved at the Battle of Sekigahara, manages to mortally wound Ii Naomasa, but is critically injured in the process. As he walks from the field wounded and bleeding, Toyohisa finds himself transported to a corridor of doors, where a bespectacled man at a desk waits for him. This man, Murasaki, sends Toyohisa through the nearest door where he wakes up in another world. There, Toyohisa meets other great warriors like him who have been transported as well, to be part of a group known as "Drifters".

This world contains both native humans and a number of fantastical races, including elves, dwarves, and hobbits. However, the world is at war, with the humans waging a losing conflict against another group of great warriors, the "Ends", who wish to take over the world and kill all of the Drifters. Under the Ends' command are many horrible creatures, including giants and dragons, which they use to destroy everything in their path. At the start of the series, the Ends' army has control of the northern part of the continent, and are trying to invade the south through a pivotal fortress at the northernmost tip of a nation called Carneades. Meanwhile, the "Octobrist Organization", a group of human magicians native to this world, attempts to bring together the many individual Drifters to save their world from the brutal Ends.

== Media ==
=== Manga ===
Written and illustrated by Kouta Hirano, Drifters debuted in Shōnen Gahosha's seinen manga magazine Young King Ours on April 30, 2009. It is licensed in North America by Dark Horse Comics, in France by Éditions Tonkam, in Germany by Panini Comics, in Italy by J-Pop, in Taiwan by Tong Li Comics, in Poland by Japonica Polonica Fantastica, and in Spain by Norma Editorial.

==== Volumes ====
No.	Original release date	Original ISBN	English release date	English ISBN
1	July 7, 2010	978-4-7859-3407-1	August 24, 2011	978-1-59582-769-2
1. "Fight Song"; 2. "Transcending Times" (刻を越えて, Koku o Koete); 3. "The Devil" (魔王, Maō); 4. "Moon Over the Castle in Ruins" (荒城の月, Kōjōnotsuki); 5. "Footfalls" (踵 鳴る, Kakato Naru); 6. "Powerless Ones" (非力なる者, Hirikinaru Mono); 7. "Hurry Go Round"; 8. "My Army Marches at Dawn" (俺軍 暁の出撃, Ore-gun Akatsuki no Shutsugeki); 9. "Burn My Dread"; 10. "My Boyfriend Is a Pilot" (私の彼はパイロット, Watashi no Kareha Pairotto); 11. "Samurai Heart" (サムライハート, Samurai Hāto)
2	October 13, 2011	978-4-7859-3714-0	July 25, 2012	978-1-59582-933-7
12. "Active Heart" (アクティブハート, Akutibu Hāto); 13. "Stand up to the Victory"; 14. "Ready Steady Go"; 15. "Monkey Magic"; 16. "Sucker"; 17. "Get Back That Love" (愛をとりもどせ, Ai Wo Torimodose); 18. "Men of Destiny"; 19. "Dive for You"; 20. "SearchLight" (サーチライト, Sāchiraito); 21. "Chaos Diver" (カオスダイバー, Kaosu Daibā); 22. "Collateral of Battle" (戦いのコラテラル, Tatakai no Korateraru)
3	March 18, 2013	978-4-7859-5043-9	March 12, 2014	978-1-61655-339-5
23. "Touch and Go!"; 24. "Kick It Out"; 25. "Mysterious Call Me" (不思議CALL ME, Fushigi CALL ME); 26. "Changed Edge"; 27. "Guardian Angel"; 28. "Dynamite Explosion"; 29. "Serious Bomber" (本気ボンバー, Honki Bonbā); 30. "Proof of Existence" (存在証明, Sonzai Shōmei); 31. "Side Dishes Make the Meal" (ごはんはおかず, Gohan wa Okazu); 32. "Omen"; 33. "Baby Yetu"; 34. "Why are you that way?" (どうしてそうなの?, Dōshite Sōna no?); 35. "The Accomplice Laughs" (共犯者は笑う, Kyōhan-sha wa Warau)
4	October 27, 2014	978-4-7859-5436-9	August 9, 2017	978-1-61655-574-0
36. "Golden Time Lover" (ゴールデンタイムラバー, Gōruden Raimurabā); 37. "Smileless Smile" (スマイルレススマイル, Sumairuresu Sumairu); 38. "Don't Interfere!" (手を出すな！, Tewodasuna!); 39. "The Pistol Daimyo's Adventure ~Counting Songs Around a Fuse~" (ピストル大名の冒険, Pisutoru Daimyō no Bōken ~Hinawa Maru Kazoeuta~); 40. "Mitsumete☆Shinsengumi" (みつめて☆新選組, Mitsumete☆Shinsengumi); 41. "Ghost Sweeper" (ゴーストスイーパー, Gōsuto Suīpā); 42. "Warrior's Dance"; 43. "Okuman Shousha" (億万笑者, Okuman Shōsha); 44. "The Song of the Fervid Kyushu Man" (熱血九州男児の唄, Nekketsu Kyūshū Danji no Uta); 45. "What 'bout my star?" 46. "Money Money Money"; 47. "Mononoke Dance" (モノノケダンス, Mononoke Dansu)
5	June 6, 2016	978-4-7859-5790-2	December 20, 2017	978-1-5067-0379-4
48. "Become the Me that is Anything but Human" (人間以外の俺になれ, Ningen Igai no Ore ni Nare); 49. "Rewrite" (リライト, Riraito); 50. "Bring On A War"; 51. "Fake Hooligan" (ニセモノフーリガン, Nisemonofūrigan); 52. "The Most Awesome Guy In Class" (クラスで一番スゴイやつ, Kurasu de Ichiban Sugoi Yatsu); 53. "Hybrid New Mode Theory" (ハイブリッドニューモード, Haiburiddo Nyū Mōdo); 54. "The Outlandish Knight"; 55. "Becoming Insane"; 56. "Hunting Hunting" (追ってけ追ってけ, Otteke Otteke); 57. "Work of The War God" (労働軍神, Rōdō Gunshin); 58. "Nowhere to Hide"; 59. "Draw a Line" (線をかく, Sen o Kaku)
6	November 30, 2018	978-4-7859-6344-6	December 18, 2019	978-1-5067-1546-9
60. "Stage of the Ground"; 61. "Flaming Fate" (炎のさだめ, Honō no Sadame); 62. "Steel Lullaby" (鉄のララバイ, Tetsu no Rarabai); 63. "After the Fall"; 64. "Dream Color Chaser" (夢色チェイサー, Yumeiro Cheisā); 65. "Macho Dragon" (マッチョドラゴン, Matcho Doragon); 66. "The Backstabbing Sunset" (裏切りの夕焼け, Uragiri no Yūyake); 67. "Reason"; 68. "Wind"; 69. "Fighting On"; 70. "Heavenly Blue"; 71. "Shinsengumi" (新選組)
7	August 10, 2023	978-4-7859-7497-8	—	—
72. "Asteroid Blues" (アステロイドブルース, Asuteroido Burūsu); 73. "Baka Survivor" (バカサバイバー, Baka Sabaibā); 74. "After, in the Dark"; 75. "Running Solo Song" (独走歌, Dokusō Uta); 76. "Country Road" (カントリーロード, Kantorī Rōdo); 77. "Unyielding Wish" (ゆずれない願い, Yuzurenai Negai); 78. "Joy"; 79. "When Johnny Comes Marching Home" (ジョニーが凱旋するとき, Jonī ga Gaisen Suru Toki); 80. "Polka for Grandpa & His Children" (老人と子供のポルカ, Rōjin to Kodomo no Poruka); 81. "Instinct Speed" (本能スピード, Hon'nō Supīdo); 82. "The World is at Our Mercy" (世界は僕らの言いなりさ, Sekai wa Bokura no Iinari-sa); 83. "Horn Blast" (喇叭激突ヶ響, Rappa Totsugeki Hibiki); 84. "Sunfine' Bird"; 85. "Fortunate Son"; 86. "Ningen President" (人間大統領, Ningen Daitōryō)

==== Chapters not yet in tankōbon format ====
87. "My Father's Longest Day" (親父の一番長い日, Oyaji no Ichiban Nagai hi)
88. "Shame"
89. "Flashback Disco"
90. "Raise Up"
91. "To the North" (北へ, Kita e)
92. "When World Collide"
93. "Chime" (チャイム, Chaimu)
94. "The Godfather"
95. "Daddy's Song" (パパの歌, Papa no Uta)
96. "Yumemiru Shoujo ja Irarenai" (夢見る少女じゃいられない)
97. "The Elegant Lady" (幕 華の淑女, Yuga na josei)
98. "Jenny's in a Bad Mood" (ジェニーはご機嫌ななめ, Jenny wa Gokigen Naname)

=== Anime ===
A 150-second anime adaptation of Drifters was packaged with the final volume of the Hellsing Ultimate video series in December 2012. The short, produced under the supervision of Ryoji Nakamori, technical director Kazuya Miura, and animation director Masayori Komine, featured the voices of Yūichi Nakamura as Shimazu Toyohisa and Mitsuru Miyamoto as Murasaki, with music composed by Yasushi Ishii.

In the May 2015 issue of Young King OURs, it was announced that a Drifters anime adaptation was in the works. A production site for the anime has been released. The anime was directed by Kenichi Suzuki, produced by NBCUniversal Entertainment Japan, animated by Hoods Drifters Studio, written by Hideyuki Kurata and Yōsuke Kuroda, featuring character designs by Ryoji Nakamori. Yasushi Ishii and Hayato Matsuo composed the music together. The opening theme, "Gospel Of The Throttle 狂奔REMIX ver.", is performed by Minutes til Midnight, while the ending theme, "Vermillion", is performed by Maon Kurosaki.

The 12-episode series began airing on October 7, 2016, on Tokyo MX. A specially edited version of the first and second episodes with a runtime of 36 minutes was bundled with the manga's fifth volume, and released on June 6, 2016. A special limited-pressing Blu-ray box set was released on December 30, 2016. The box set includes all twelve episodes (with added unaired footage), an exclusive box illustrated by Hirano, a 200-page animation sketch collection by chief animation director Ryoji Nakamori, a 52-page booklet, a bonus extras disc, and a two-CD original soundtrack. The bonus extras disc contained an omake titled "Kokuō-sama Go-Ranshin (黒王様御乱心)", promotional videos, and other materials. Customers who pre-ordered the box set from participating retailers before November 6, 2016, would receive an exclusive illustration card set. Additionally, the box set included a form for advance ticket sales for an event that was held on April 2, 2017, at Maihama Amphitheater in Chiba.

In Japan, the anime is exclusively streamed on the AbemaTV service simultaneously as the anime aired on Japanese television, starting on October 7 at 11p.m. The series has been licensed by Funimation for streaming in English-speaking countries and home video and on-demand distribution for the U.S. Additionally, Funimation streamed Drifters in English beginning on November 6, 2016, at 10:00 p.m. ET. As part of Funimation's partnership with Crunchyroll, Crunchyroll also streamed Drifters as it aired in Japan. Drifters was also broadcast on Aniplus Asia. Funimation released a DVD/Blu-ray combo package for Drifters on October 3, 2017. Universal Pictures UK acquired the series for the United Kingdom and Ireland, and released it on October 8, 2018. Universal Sony classified the series for release in Australia and New Zealand, and released it on October 17, 2018.

At the end of the anime's twelfth episode, a second season was announced with the message "See You Again, Tokyo 20XX". On October 10, 2017, it was announced the thirteenth and fourteenth episodes, the first two episodes of the second season were released on December 23, 2017, on Blu-ray discs in regular and limited-edition versions. The limited edition includes an outer case illustrated by manga creator Kouta Hirano, a jacket illustrated by character designer and chief animation director Ryoji Nakamori, a bonus video, a drama CD, a 72-page booklet, and a "mystery disc." A fifteenth episode was released on DVD with the manga's 6th volume special edition on November 30, 2018.

==== Episodes ====
No.	Title (Note: All English titles are taken from Crunchyroll.)	Original release date
1	"Fight Song"	October 7, 2016
During the Battle of Sekigahara against Ii Naomasa and his army, Shimazu Toyohisa manages to mortally injure Naomasa, but is critically wounded in the process. Naomasa's army is forced to retreat due to Toyohisa's perseverance and resilience. As he walks from the battlefield wounded and bleeding, Toyohisa finds himself transported to a corridor of doors, where a bespectacled man at a desk waits for him. As he is about to attack the bespectacled man, Toyohisa is sucked into one of the doors and dropped into a field, unconscious. Two elven children, speaking in a strange language, find Toyohisa and decide bring him to a castle ruins, the hideout for two other Drifters. Toyohisa's wounds are stitched up and after waking up from a dream, he meets Oda Nobunaga, a daimyō who was killed eighteen years prior to Toyohisa's involvement in the Battle of Sekigahara, and Nasu Suketaka Yoichi, an effeminate archer who died almost four centuries ago. The trio discuss how they met the same bespectacled man who brought them to the unknown world. Outside of their hideout, a female spy monitors the Drifters and is contacted by a man via a magical crystal ball to check on her status. The man in white decides to meet the Drifters and mobilize their men, known as the Octobrist Organization, to prepare for the upcoming war with the Ends, an opposing force advocating for the destruction of the world.
2	"Footsteps"; Transliteration: "Kakato Naru" (Japanese: 踵鳴る)	October 14, 2016
In a desert wasteland, Hannibal and Scipio Africanus are in the middle of a heated argument while a member from the Octobrist Organization, Ham, observes them from afar. Ham is ordered by the man in white, Abe no Seimei, to bring the Drifters to him in preparations for the war against the Ends. Meanwhile, the elven village located near Toyohisa's group of Drifters is attacked and set on fire by soldiers from the Orte Empire for associating with the Drifters. Alerted by smell of battle, Toyohisa heads to the village to rescue the elves to repay his debt to the young elves, Marsha and Mark, for helping him earlier. Joined by Nobunaga and Yoichi, they easily defeat the elves' human oppressors. Enraged by the carnage and cruelty inflicted upon the elves by the Empire's soldiers, Toyohisa brutally beats Aram, the commander knight charged with massacring the elves, with the sheath of his sword before convincing the elves to kill Aram themselves. In the corridor of doors, the bespectacled man, Murasaki, is visited by his nemesis, EASY, who mocks his efforts to send Drifters to the unknown world to combat her Ends, who have begun invading the southern regions of the world.
3	"Army of Ours—Sortie at Dawn"; Transliteration: "Ore-gun Akatsuki no Shutsugeki" (Japanese: 俺軍 暁の出撃)	October 21, 2016
In the Kingdom of Carneades, Seimei and Ham try to convince the commanders of the defensive troops to let Scipio and Hannibal take charge of their army. However, the leaders refuse to give the two Drifters command over their troops, seeing them as nothing more than useless old men. Unable to reason with the Carneades soldiers, Seimei decides to withdraw the Octobrists and the Drifters from the country as the Ends and their army, consisting of dragons, goblins, and other non-human races, begin their attack. The leader of the Ends, the Black King, sends Hijikata Toshizō, Jeanne d'Arc, and Anastasia Nikolaevna Romanova into the battlefield, and questions Minamoto no Yoshitsune if his allegiance is with the Drifters or the Ends. Yoshitsune vaguely states he will go the side that interests him the most. World War II fighter pilot Naoshi Kanno descends into the world via a corridor inside his aircraft. Though bewildered by the circumstances, Naoshi engages the Black King's dragons, thus indicating himself as a Drifter. With the aid of Butch Cassidy and Sundance Kid, Seimei, Ham, Scipio, and Hannibal escape from Carneades to join up with Toyohisa's group. The Black King orders the Ends to find the Drifters and kill them. Meanwhile, the female spy monitoring Toyohisa's group is discovered by him and his companions. The spy, Olminu, informs the Drifters that they have been brought to the new world to fight against the Ends, though the trio quickly reject the idea, much to her shock.
4	"Active Heart"; Transliteration: "Akutibu Hāto" (Japanese: アクティブハート)	October 28, 2016
Olminu explains to Toyohisa, Nobunaga, and Yoichi that their purpose as Drifters is to save the world from being annihilated by the Ends. To accomplish this, she informs them that the Octobrists are tasked with gathering the Drifters together and appealing to the kings and feudal lords of the various states and countries to give command over their armies to the Drifters. However, Nobunaga is skeptical that the lords would allow outsiders to take charge of their armies. Instead, he proposes that the Drifters, led by Toyohisa, take over the Orte Empire, much to Olminu's initial horror. Meanwhile, following his success at Carneades, the Black King tends to his wounded troops and orders Grigori Rasputin to spread the news of Carneades's defeat to recruit more soldiers in their army. Back in the elven village, Toyohisa's group offer to assist the elves with their fight against Orte to reclaim their state, though Toyohisa and Nobunaga fight over the leadership arrangements. Shara, the eldest son of the murdered village's chief, interrupts them and pleads for their help. Toyohisa agrees to take the role of the commander, and begins to set a trap for the Orte punitive forces set to arrive in three days. On the third day, a force of 200 Orte troops march into the village, only to find it uninhabited. Encamped in the trees outside of the village, the Drifters and elves prepare to strike the Orte soldiers at nightfall.
5	"Bring Back Love"; Transliteration: "Ai o Torimodose" (Japanese: 愛をとりもどせ)	November 4, 2016
Prior to the ambush planned by the Drifters, Nobunaga uses corpses and various human wastes to create a saltpeter pit after Toyohisa buries the heads of the deceased as a sign of respect. Meanwhile, Yoichi begins to train the elves in archery, and is surprised to learn that they have an innate aptitude for it. As night sinks in, the Orte troops notice that the village's water well was dumped with excrement. At nightfall, Toyohisa and the elves launch their attack on the Orte soldiers as Nobunaga forms an enclosure to trap the Orte troops and continuously bombards them with waste-laden arrows. Toyohisa beheads the commander of the troops, prompting the remaining soldiers to flee. In the forest, Yoichi kills the fleeing soldiers, who fall victim to excrement-infested traps. After their successful battle, Toyohisa urges the elves to rescue the female elves. Disguised as Orte troops, the Drifters and elves make their way to the local magistrate's fort and locate the women. Much to his horror and disgust, Toyohisa discovers that the women have been used as sex slaves by the Orte soldiers and vows to slaughter them all in retribution.
6	"Men of Destiny"	November 11, 2016
After successfully taking over the fortress, Nobunaga rummages through the magistrate's office for vital documents. At his inquiry, Olminu reveals to Nobunaga that the founder of the Orte Empire was Adolf Hitler, who committed suicide shortly after establishing the country fifty years ago. Receiving word that Toyohisa plans to execute the Orte soldiers for raping the female elves, Nobunaga stops him and gives the execution order himself, not wanting the latter to dirty his hands with blood. Toyohisa punches Nobunaga for his interference, and the two reach an agreement to let Toyohisa do whatever he feels is right in the future. The Drifters return the women back to their respective villages with a proclamation, which contains information about the heavy losses Orte is suffering from waging wars with numerous states. As a result, elven villages across the land begin to revolt and join the Drifters. In Orte's capital city, the city's council discusses the losing wars in neighboring states, particularly their war against the merchant guild of Gu-Binnen. Count Saint-Germi, a powerful nobleman and former ally to Hitler, realizes Orte's impending downfall and chooses to seek an alliance with the Drifters. At nightfall, Jeanne d'Arc, Gilles de Rais, and several soldiers of the Black King's army approach the Drifters' hideout.
7	"Chaos Diver"; Transliteration: "Kaosu Daibā" (Japanese: カオスダイバー)	November 18, 2016
Jeanne d'Arc, Gilles de Rais, and a cavalry of the Black King's army attack the Drifters' camp. After evacuating the elven women and children, Toyohisa confronts Jeanne, who he mistakes for a man, while Yoichi faces off against Gilles. In the forest, Nobunaga and the elves take care of the cavalry. With Olminu's assistance, Toyohisa is able to defeat Jeanne, but refuses to kill her when he realizes that she is a woman. Meanwhile, Yoichi struggles in his battle against Gilles due to the latter's inhuman strength and durability. Before Yoichi is nearly killed, Butch and the Sundance Kid arrive at the scene, using their Gatling gun to destroy Gilles's body and save Yoichi. Gilles barely survives the brutal onslaught, much to the Drifters' shock. Seeing Jeanne being rescued by the dragon riders in the Back King's army, Gilles dies with a smile, and promises to wait for Jeanne to join him in the afterlife as he disintegrates into salt. After reuniting with Olminu, Seimei introduces himself to the Drifters as the leader of the Octobrist Organization.
8	"Mystery - Call Me"; Transliteration: "Fushigi CALL ME" (Japanese: 不思議CALL ME)	November 25, 2016
In a secluded area, Yoichi reflects on his battle with Gilles de Rais when he is approached by Yoshitsune, who mocks his former subordinate for following Bushido despite committing dishonorable acts during the Genpei War while under his command. A distressed Yoichi tells Yoshitsune he will never take orders from him again, but Yoshitsune merely laughs at him before he departs. Meanwhile, Seimei tells Nobunaga he was brought to the new world to help combat the Ends. Toyohisa returns and informs the group that he knocked Jeanne unconscious in a nearby well. Seimei reprimands Toyohisa for allowing Jeanne to escape due to her gender, but Toyohisa is determined to uphold his principles and not become Murasaki's pawn. The next day, Scipio, who was separated from Seimei's group during the ride to rendezvous with Toyohisa's group, encounters Naoshi, who has been appointed the "sky god" to a tribe of anthropomorphic dogs. Back at the Drifters' camp, Butch and Sundance Kid explain the mechanics behind their firearms to Nobunaga, who becomes ecstatic at the notion of producing more modern firearms. Nobunaga reveals to a concerned Seimei that he wish to create a multiracial federation with Toyohisa as their leader. At nightfall, Toyohisa leads his group to free the dwarves from Orte while Seimei, Butch, and Sundance Kid leave to search for Scipio and continue their investigation on the Ends.
9	"Serious Bomber"; Transliteration: "Honki Bonbā" (Japanese: 本気ボンバー)	December 2, 2016
While Count Saint-Germi and his aides journey to the elven village to meet with the Drifters, Toyohisa's group attacks the Orte Empire's largest armory in Gadolka to save the dwarves. Utilizing the gunpowder that Nobunaga has concocted with the elves' assistance, Toyohisa leads the charge against the troops stationed there. However, they are unable to enter the walled town after the Orte soldiers closed the entrance gate. Hannibal gives Nobunaga the idea to use Yoichi's arrows and Olminu's stone wall spells to cast a staircase alongside the gate, enabling Toyohisa's group to invade the town and free the dwarves. Since the dwarves have been suffering from starvation during their captivity, Toyohisa orders meals to be prepared for them instead of taking down the castle defenders. Toyohisa negotiates with the remaining Orte troops to surrender peacefully and allows them to escape, though he slays the commander. When Yoichi prepares to pursue the fleeing troops, a habit he developed when serving Yoshitsune in the past, Toyohisa stops him and tells him that he does not have to follow dishonorable orders anymore since this is their war, much to Yoichi's delight. Meanwhile, a member of the Octobrist Organization and his partner, Doug, spy on the Ends at Carneades. They are horrified to learn that the Black King taught primitive agriculture to the monsters that will some day replace the humans once the Ends have eliminated mankind.
10	"Baba Yetu"	December 9, 2016
The Black King attempts to recruit one of the six Great Dragons, the Bronze Dragon, into joining his army, but is met with contempt and refusal by the latter for subjugating his dragon brethren as "pets" in his army. Using his ability to replicate the cells of any life form, the Black King tortures the Bronze Dragon by causing his body to suffer from cancerous growth to gain his compliance. Afterwards, Rasputin presents the completion of a simple alphabet and a syncretic religion for the demihumans to learn to help establish a unified, multiracial community, as per the Black King's wishes. Meanwhile, Jeanne awakens from her coma after her fight with Toyohisa and is informed by Anastasia that Gilles de Rais is dead. An enraged Jeanne vows to avenge her fallen comrade by killing Toyohisa, to which Anastasia scolds her for her recklessness before promising to let her do as she pleases when the time comes. In Gadolka, Nobunaga requests that the dwarves begin forging muskets for their army to use in future battles. The next day, Count Saint-Germi and his companions arrive in Gadolka to meet with the Drifters, sending his aides to test Toyohisa to see if they are worthy to form an alliance with. Saint-Germi reveals to Olminu that he is a Drifter, and that he wants to sell the Orte Empire to the Drifters before Orte is destroyed by other warring countries. In order to accomplish this, Saint-Germi recommends that the Drifters plan a coup d'état to seize Orte as their territory.
11	"The Adventure of the Pistol Daimyō ~Bullet Counting Song~"; Transliteration: "Pisutoru Daimyō no Bōken 〜Hinawa Maru Kazoeuta〜" (Japanese: ピストル大名の冒険 〜火縄丸数え歌〜)	December 16, 2016
While Saint-Germi's aides sneak the Drifters and their army into the Orte Empire's capital city, Saint-Germi holds an emergency council meeting with the lords charged with overseeing Orte and informs them that he is selling the country to the Drifters. His attempt to coerce the noblemen to surrender peacefully, however, is disrupted by Rasputin, who possesses two of the nobles to reveal that the Black King is also planning to seize the Orte Empire for his campaign. After being humiliated by Toyohisa and Nobunaga, Rasputin retreats, and the Black King sends Hijikata and his troops to combat the Drifters in the capital, shifting their focus from seizing Orte to destroying it to prevent the Drifters from obtaining it. To assist with the ensuing battle, Saint-Germi gives his personal army, the Sacred Band of Thebes, over to Nobunaga to act as the army's gunner squad while Toyohisa and Yoichi lead the dwarves and elves, respectively, into the fray. After the Drifters successfully take out the Ends' vanguard, an angered Hijikata heads onto the battlefield.
12	"Staring at Shinsengumi ~The Song of the Fervid Kyūshū Man~"; Transliteration: "Mitsumete Shinsengumi 〜 Nekketsu Kyūshū Danji no Uta 〜" (Japanese: みつめて新選組 〜熱血九州男児の唄〜)	December 23, 2016
As the Drifters and their army decimate the Ends' troops, Hijikata gives orders for his soldiers to break into smaller units and disperse into the streets setting the city ablaze while heading to Orte's capitol buildings. Hijikata and Toyohisa meet in the street and engage one another in a deadly duel, with Hijikata using the ghostly images of dead Shinsengumi to attack Toyohisa. Meanwhile, Nobunaga and Hannibal decide that instead of chasing the Ends' troops, they will trap their enemies in the capitol buildings when they arrive and kill them with Yoichi's squad and Olminu's reluctant assistance. With their army destroyed, the Black King orders Hijikata to withdraw from his fight against Toyohisa, who is left badly injured. Back in Carneades, Rasputin apologizes to the Black King for their failure for seizing Orte, though the Black King is pleased that they were able to cripple the capital city and gauge the Drifters' strength. Akechi Mitsuhide thinks back to hearing Nobunaga's voice during his encounter with Rasputin and decides to join the Ends in the hope of killing Nobunaga in the next battle.
13 (OVA)	"Rewrite"; Transliteration: "Riraito" (Japanese: リライト)	December 23, 2017 (DVD/Blu-ray)
Following the battle of Orte, Yoichi stitches up the badly injured Toyohisa. Nobunaga and Count Saint-Germi discuss their next move, while Abe no Haruakira and Doug observe the events in Orte's north. They sneak in disguised as scouts and observe trade being carried out by orcs and goblins, using smelted metal from the Bronze Dragon. They also see humans being sold as slaves or as livestock for food, and are surprised at the fast advancement in building a society and an economy. However, they are discovered by Yoshitsune, who kills Doug and then shows Seimei the advancing Ends army. The Black King appears and tells Seimei that he plans to destroy all humans, because of their continued development of ever more powerful weapons, planning for a new Dark Age. Back in Orte, Nobunaga demands more money from the nobles to fund his war. He considers that winning over the Third and Fourth Armies of the west will be a challenge, but it appears that Second Army in the north has been overrun by beasts commanded by Naoshi. Nobunaga addresses the nobles, with some smoke effects for emphasis, but interrupted by the recovering Toyohisa desperately looking for food.
14 (OVA)	"Bring On a War"	December 23, 2017 (DVD/Blu-ray)
500 miles east of Orte lies Gu-Binnen, a nation ruled by seven guilds and led by the secretary of the Shylock Bank & Trading House, Banzelmashin Shylock VIII. The United Gu-Binnen's marine fleet, with the aid of the Admiral of Japan's Imperial Navy, Drifter Tamon Yamaguchi, has defeated the Orte fifth fleet and now controls the sea trading routes. With the Second Army in the north occupied with Naoshi, and the Orte navy to the east defeated, Nobunaga's only concerns are the Third and Fourth Orte Armies in the west. Nobunaga sends a message to General Jigmente of the Third Army and General Lemek of the Fourth Army, offering the long vacant position of the Nation's Father, to the first to arrive in Berlina. Taking the bait, Jigmente's troops ambush and kill Lemek, while Yoichi ambushes Jigmente and kills him, leaving the two leaderless armies effectively neutralized. Meanwhile, Count Saint-Germi meets Shylock, whose navy has control of the sea. They discuss peace terms, and Saint-Germi offers him rifles and trade in exchange for a truce, which he accepts.
15 (OVA)	"The Outlandish Knight"	November 30, 2018 (only DVD)

== Reception ==
The manga has sold over 1.5 million copies worldwide in five different languages. Drifters has been nominated twice for the annual Manga Taishō Awards, once in the year 2011 and again in the year 2012. The manga was also received well by BAMFAS, saying that the "action paces itself throughout the volume, making sure to include only enough to keep readers moving quickly through the event until the next transition hits." Writers for Crunchyroll note that "Drifters has all but jumped the shark by belligerently knocking over all the narrative pillars of the genre."

In a survey by the Japanese website Anime Anime!, Drifters won fifth place among top 10 manga properties to have an animated adaptation.

== See also ==
- Riverworld, a book series with a similar concept
- Warriors Orochi, a video game spin-off of Dynasty Warriors with a similar concept
