= Super Ice Hockey =

1994 video game

- Japanese cover art
- Developer: Opera House
- Publishers: JP: Yonezawa PR21; EU: Sunsoft
- Composer: Hayato Matsuo
- Platform: Super NES
- Release: March 25, 1994
- Genre: Sports
- Modes: Single-player, multiplayer

Super Ice Hockey (Note: released in Japan as Super Hockey '94 (スーパーホッケー '94)) is a 1994 ice hockey sports video game developed by Opera House and released in Japan by Yonezawa PR21 and Europe by Sunsoft for the Super Nintendo Entertainment System. It is based on the international level of ice hockey with teams from 1994 as opposed to domestic (intra-national) ice hockey leagues.

== Gameplay ==
Face-off

There are several gameplay modes that can be chosen from the main menu of the game. These include exhibition mode, playoff mode, and an Olympic mode that is loosely based on the 1994 Winter Olympics. The object of the Olympic mode is to simply win the gold medal while the defeated team receives a silver medal. In order to qualify for the gold medal game, the player must rank in the top four in either "League A" or "League B" during the round-robin format; an X refers to a win while an O refers to a defeat. Achieving this will promote the player's team to a playoff of eight teams that will determine the gold and silver medal recipients. Teams that belong to opposite leagues eventually play against each other in the playoff mode.

Periods can either last for one minute, two minutes or three minutes long. Referees can be set to either real (similar to real international hockey), normal (similar to the NHL), or free (involving a visually challenged referee who only calls for icing). In the real mode, penalties are given for every body check while most body checking is allowed in normal. However, both participants that are involved in a fight are penalized in both normal and real mode. This is offset by using extremely short durations in the penalty box due to the unrealistically low period durations.
