= Hayato Matsuo =

Japanese music composer and orchestrator

- 松尾 早人
- Born: August 13, 1965 (age 61); Kashiwa, Chiba, Japan
- Education: Tokyo University of the Arts
- Occupations: Composer; orchestrator; pianist
- Years active: 1991–present
- Musical career
- Genres: Orchestral; funk
- Instrument: Piano

Hayato Matsuo (松尾 早人, Matsuo Hayato; born August 13, 1965) is a Japanese music composer and orchestrator who primarily does work in video games and anime. He has worked on games such as Front Mission 3, Final Fantasy XII, the Shenmue series, Magic Knight Rayearth, and Hellsing Ultimate. He graduated from the Tokyo University of the Arts in 1991 and began working with composer Koichi Sugiyama as an assistant.

His first score was Master of Monsters (1991). Over the next few years, he worked on several games and anime series. In 1995, he joined the independent music composition group Imagine. He has continued since then to compose and orchestrate works for several game, anime, and television series, as well as a few pieces for original albums.

== Biography ==
=== Early life ===
Matsuo's mother was a piano and electone teacher, and she inspired him to enjoy classical music. She also organized concerts for local children to compose and perform music in, which he took part in. While in school, he was inspired by Yellow Magic Orchestra and Rick Wakeman. He eventually attended Tokyo University of the Arts, where he focused on classical music. While in school, however, he also was involved in more popular music, and was involved with the progressive rock band G-Clef, filling in sometimes for members of the band, many of whom he was friends with. He also provided some music for the band. When he was near graduation, Matsuo was introduced to Koichi Sugiyama, the composer for the Dragon Quest franchise. Upon graduating, he went to work with Sugiyama.

=== Career ===
Matsuo began his career arranging Sugiyama's pieces for Dragon Quest: The Adventure of Dai in 1991. His first work as an also came in 1991, with the video game Master of Monsters. His first notable work came in 1993 with Ogre Battle: March of the Black Queen, which he worked on with Hitoshi Sakimoto and Masaharu Iwata. Since then, he has worked on over 30 other video games, both as a composer and orchestrator.

Beginning in 1994, Matsuo has also written music for anime series. His first was Magic Knight Rayearth, which he considers to be a turning point in his career. In 2003 he composed the soundtrack for the live-action television show Kamen Rider 555, and in the early 1990s he arranged pieces for orchestration for the Orchestral Game Music Concerts. While his early work was done as an entirely freelance, in 1995 Matuso was recruited by Kohei Tanaka to join Imagine. Imagine is an independent music composition and sound effect group for video games, consisting of nine employees. While Matsuo has never released an album of original works himself, he has released numerous original tracks on six albums released on Shinji Hosoe's Troubadour Records label.

== Works ==
All works listed below were composed by Matsuo unless otherwise noted.

=== Video games ===
| Year | Title | Note(s) |
|---|---|---|
| 1991 | Master of Monsters | |
| 1991 | Mercury: The Prime Master | with Taku Iwasaki, Seirou Okamoto and Tsushi Yamaji |
| 1992 | Syvalion | Super NES version |
| 1993 | Ogre Battle: March of the Black Queen | with Hitoshi Sakimoto and Masaharu Iwata |
| 1993 | Classic Road | |
| 1993 | Sword Maniac | with Hitoshi Sakimoto |
| 1994 | Super Ice Hockey | |
| 1994 | World Heroes 2 | PC Engine arrangements |
| 1995 | Classic Road II | |
| 1995 | Tengai Makyō: Kabuki Ittou Ryoudan | with several others |
| 1996 | Master of Monsters: Neo Generation | |
| 1996 | Nights into Dreams | theme song orchestration |
| 1997 | Chou-Mahsin Eiyuuden Wataru: Another Step | |
| 1998 | Dragon Force II | with Kohei Tanaka |
| 1998 | Let's Smash | |
| 1999 | Front Mission 3 | with Koji Hayama |
| 1999 | Ogre Battle 64 | with Hitoshi Sakimoto and Masaharu Iwata |
| 1999 | Shenmue | orchestration |
| 2001 | Shiren the Wanderer GB2 | |
| 2001 | Shenmue II | orchestration |
| 2002 | Shiren the Wanderer Gaiden: Asuka the Swordswoman | |
| 2002 | Panzer Dragoon Orta | arrangements |
| 2004 | Dragon Quest & Final Fantasy in Itadaki Street Special | arrangements |
| 2005 | Homeland | |
| 2006 | Dragon Quest & Final Fantasy in Itadaki Street Portable | |
| 2006 | Dragon Quest: Young Yangus and the Mystery Dungeon | arrangements |
| 2006 | Final Fantasy XII | with Hitoshi Sakimoto and Masaharu Iwata |
| 2006 | Mystery Dungeon: Shiren the Wanderer | arrangements |
| 2007 | Itadaki Street DS | arrangements |
| 2007 | Dragon Quest IV | DS arrangements |
| 2008 | Dragon Quest V | DS arrangements |
| 2008 | Shiren the Wanderer | |
| 2010 | Dragon Quest VI | DS arrangements |
| 2010 | Shiren the Wanderer 4 | |
| 2010 | Shiren the Wanderer: The Tower of Fortune and the Dice of Fate | |
| 2010 | GO Series: Pinball Attack! | |
| 2010 | Arrow of Laputa | |
| 2011 | El Shaddai: Ascension of the Metatron | arrangements |
| 2012 | Dragon Quest X | sound programming |
| 2022 | Stranger of Paradise: Final Fantasy Origin | arrangements with several others |

=== Anime ===
| Year | Title | Role(s) |
|---|---|---|
| 1991 | Dragon Quest: The Adventure of Dai | arrangements with Motoaki Takenouchi |
| 1994 | Magic Knight Rayearth | |
| 1995 | Saint Tail | |
| 1995 | The Brave of Gold Goldran | |
| 1995 | Magic Knight Rayearth 2 | |
| 1996 | Landlock | |
| 1997 | Haunted Junction | |
| 1999 | Street Fighter Alpha: The Animation | |
| 2001 | Spirit of Wonder Scientific Boys Club | |
| 2002 | Transformers: Armada | |
| 2005 | Guyver: The Bioboosted Armor | |
| 2006 | Hellsing Ultimate | |
| 2006 | Yomigaeru Sora - Rescue Wings | |
| 2007 | Les Misérables: Shoujo Cosette | |
| 2010 | The World God Only Knows | |
| 2011 | The World God Only Knows II | |
| 2012 | Crayon Shin-chan: Fierceness That Invites Storm! Me and the Space Princess | with Keiji Inai, Toshiyuki Arakawa and Akifumi Tada |
| 2012 | JoJo's Bizarre Adventure | Phantom Blood arc |
| 2013 | The World God Only Knows: Goddesses | |
| 2013 | A Certain Magical Index: The Miracle of Endymion | arrangements with Kenji Inai and Yasunori Iwasaki |
| 2014 | Shirobako | synthesizer programming |
| 2016 | Endride | with Kohei Tanaka and Hiroshi Nakamura |
| 2016 | Drifters | with Yasushi Ishii |
| 2016 | Keijo!!!!!!!! | |
| 2018 | Love, Chunibyo & Other Delusions! Take on Me | arrangements with several others |
| 2018 | Captain Tsubasa | |
| 2018 | Hi Score Girl | arrangements with several others |
| 2021 | Heaven's Design Team | |
| 2024 | The Stories of Girls Who Couldn't Be Magicians | music with Yoko Shimomura and Dai Haraguchi |
| 2027 | Tenkaichi: The Greatest Warrior Under the Rising Sun | |
| 2027 | Blade & Bastard | |

=== Television works ===
| Year | Title | Role(s) |
|---|---|---|
| 2003 | Kamen Rider 555 | |
