= List of Darker than Black: Gemini of the Meteor episodes =

Darker than Black: Gemini of the Meteor
- Funimation's compilation of the series featuring Suo Pavlichenko and Hei
- No. of episodes: 12

Release
- Original network: MBS
- Original release: October 9 – December 25, 2009

Season chronology
- ← Previous; Darker than Black

Darker than Black: Gemini of the Meteor is a Japanese anime series directed and written by Tensai Okamura and produced by Bones. It is a sequel to the 2007 series Darker than Black with most of the crew returning for production duties. The series was broadcast on MBS, TBS and their affiliated stations from October 8 to December 24, 2009. (Note: MBS listed the air dates for the series on Thursday at 25:25, which is Friday at 1:25 a.m. JST.) The sequel tells of Suo Pavlichenko, a Eurasian girl whose life is changed by a frightful incident regarding a meteor shower, and her subsequent encounter with the assassin Hei, who is still on the run from the Syndicate two years after the events in the previous season.

The series was released on both DVD and Blu-ray by Aniplex in Japan; beginning from December 23, 2009, with an estimated eight volumes with the final one released on July 21, 2010. Each odd-numbered volume contains two series episodes, while an OVA episode known as Darker than Black: Gaiden was released along with one series episode in each even-numbered volume. Altogether four OVA episodes, they are side-stories of the main characters Hei and his partner Yin, with the events set in between both seasons as Hei's backstory is explained while dealing with the awakening of the latter's alter-ego.

On July 2, 2010, Funimation announced at Anime Expo 2010 that they had licensed the second season. Funimation released the series on DVD/Blu-ray on November 8, 2011. Funimation's rights to the second season expired in 2018. Manga Entertainment released the series in the United Kingdom as a single compilation, while Madman Entertainment licensed it in Australia. The OVAs were included in the Gemini of the Meteor compilation.

The opening theme "Tsukiakari no Michishirube" (ツキアカリのミチシルベ; lit. 'Guidepost of the Moonlight') is sung by the Japanese rock band Stereopony, while the ending theme "From Dusk Till Dawn" is performed by Abingdon Boys School, who previously did the first opening theme for Darker than Black: Kuro no Keiyakusha.

== Episode list ==
No. overall	No. in season	Title	Directed by	Written by	Original air date	English air date
27	1	"Black Cats Do Not Dream of Stars"; Transliteration: "Kuroneko wa Hoshi no Yume o Minai" (Japanese: 黒猫は星の夢を見ない)	Tensai Okamura	Tensai Okamura	October 9, 2009	August 6, 2010
A Eurasian girl named Suo Pavlichenko watches a meteor shower along with her twin brother and their father, but things go awry when a meteor crashes into their location. Two years later, Shion Pavlichenko has turned into a Contractor from the incident, using a wheelchair due to his remuneration. He is locked away into the family home for safekeeping, while Dr. Mikhail Pavlichenko spends his time researching into his son's condition and the Contractors, forbidding Suo to talk or see her brother. Things go normally in their lives until Suo's best friend Tanya becomes a Contractor and attacks her boyfriend Nika when he stops her from leaving. Hei, identified as BK-201, reappears in Russia after an FSB squad tries to capture Shion alive; April also reappears in Russia on a mission to secure Shion. Hei ends up killing April in the process.
28	2	"Fallen Meteor"; Transliteration: "Ochita Ryūsei" (Japanese: 堕ちた流星)	Daisuke Chiba	Hiroyuki Yoshino	October 16, 2009	August 13, 2010
Before Hei can obtain the meteor fragment from Suō, Mina Hazuki attacks him in order to secure Suō. Suō seeks sanctuary alongside Nika to avoid being captured by FSB agents due to the events regarding Tanya's Contractor powers being known and for Suō being mistaken for Shion. When Hei tries to recapture Suō, he tries to obtain the fragment when he realizes that "Shion" is actually Suō, which greatly changes Hei's mind of securing her when an FSB squad ambushes Hei. Hei escapes along with Suō when August 7 and Genma Shizume attack the FSB squad separately to secure Suō for their own objectives. Hei and Suō are caught in a trap after Hei seemingly kills August 7 by electrocuting the British Contractor. Later on, Misaki Kirihara is shown looking through a telescope which is directed towards the star of BK-201. The star fades away.
29	3	"Vanishing in a Sea of Ice"; Transliteration: "Hyōgen ni Kieru" (Japanese: 氷原に消える)	Koichi Hatsumi	Hiroyuki Yoshino	October 23, 2009	August 20, 2010
The trap devices holding Hei explode from the energies caused by the meteor fragment. Suō goes into a daze and shoves both herself and Hei into the sea. Hei awakens in a hut with Suō in tow. After a tense exchange, Hei decides to bring Suō and leave Vladivostok. The duo try to make their escape at the train station while Nika distracts Tanya from her mission. Misaki is questioned by a MIAC official named Gorō Kobayashi about the Contractors and the Syndicate. She is given an offer to join MIAC in pursuing BK-201, who is revealed by Kobayashi to be alive. Hei and Suō meet up with Mao, now a squirrel, and July, who has joined up with them, in order to ride on a ship leaving Russia.
30	4	"The Ark Adrift on the Lake"; Transliteration: "Hakobune wa Kosui ni Tayutau" (Japanese: 方舟は湖水に揺蕩う)	Tarou Iwasaki	Mari Okada	October 30, 2009	August 27, 2010
Hei and the others landed in Sapporo, taking refuge in an uninhabited part of the city as half of it was previously flooded. Misaki was recruited into the MIAC's black ops division Section 3 and was given the alias of Yayoi Ichinose. Hoping to learn what happened to Hei, she sought out an informant to obtain information of what happened to him. Hei decides to train Suō given that she has obtained Contractor powers after the previous gunfight against FSB forces in Vladivostok. Despite Suō's hatred to Hei for changing her life, she decides to stay with him alongside July. Meanwhile, Misaki heads to the now abandoned National Observatory where she is confronted alone by Madame Oreille, who knows of her real name aside from her alias.
31	5	"Gunsmoke Blows, Life Flows"; Transliteration: "Shōen wa Nagare, Inochi wa Nagare" (Japanese: 硝煙は流れ、命は流れ)	Hideyo Yamamoto	Mari Okada	November 6, 2009	September 3, 2010
Hei is attacked by a group of MIAC agents led by Michiru, the wife of a local restaurant owner who left him three years ago after becoming a Contractor for the MIAC. Suō and July are able to escape capture from the agents under Hei's instructions. The MIAC tasks Misaki to lead a Section 3 unit in delivering a device with the codename Izanami under orders from Kobayashi. Hei recruits Suō to assist him in launching a raid on the Section 3 convoy under orders from his employers to seize Izanami with the mission, seemingly a success after the truck drives away in the attack. Michiru appears before her family in Sapporo, startling her ex-husband and son. Suō watches the waters of Sapporo after the mission, seeing an unknown submarine covertly entering Japanese territorial waters.
32	6	"An Aroma Sweet, a Heart Bitter"; Transliteration: "Kaori wa Amaku, Kokoro wa Nigaku" (Japanese: 香りは甘く、心は苦く)	Yuriko Sugaya	Mari Okada	November 13, 2009	September 10, 2010
Hei engages Genma in a battle, taking in the trap prepared by Misaki while she and the rest of Section 3 prepare to transport Izanami to the Greater Tokyo Area on the submarine. Suō and July are tasked by Mao to take down the metal container that houses Izanami. Hei, after realizing that Yin was in the container all along, interrupts Suō's attempt to shoot it and instead retreats. Hei and the others retreat from Sapporo also, heading to Tokyo after Suō witnesses the death of Michiru when a specter resembling Yin appears to drown her with her water powers. Misaki is later warned not to think of Yōko Sawasaki as an ally. Hei then goes rogue once more, cutting off connections with Madame Oreille. When Suō sees Yin's specter from the electric pole, she kicks it before walking with Hei back to their hideout.
33	7	"The Doll Sings in the Winter Wind"; Transliteration: "Kazabana ni ningyou wa utau" (Japanese: 風花に人形は唄う)	Shingo Kaneko	Shinsuke Onishi	November 20, 2009	September 17, 2010
Repnin complains about the mystery behind Dr. Pavlichenko's corpse, when he is shown a picture of Dr. Pavlichenko alive and well in Tokyo. Meanwhile, Misaki meets Genma at the abandoned National Observatory and learns that communications between her and the rest of the world are being tapped by the MIAC. Hei and the others escape from Sapporo under a heavy police lockdown by seeking assistance from the underworld. However, Hei is later duped when their contact gets away with kidnapping July. A Russian agent named Ilya Sokolov encounters Suō and uses his Contractor powers to help him detain her, Mao, and July; after killing their contact. Hei later comes to their rescue and kills Ilya, despite nearly being overpowered by Ilya's powers. The four later were able to arrive at the Sendai station, boarding it while Repnin of the FSB watches them from his cabin.
34	8	"Twinkling Sun on a Summer Day"; Transliteration: "Natsu no Hi, Taiyō wa Yurete" (Japanese: 夏の日、太陽はゆれて)	Hideki Ito	Shinsuke Onishi	November 27, 2009	September 24, 2010
Hei is intercepted by Repnin's men in the train hallway and Suō is confronted by Tanya. Repnin offers Hei a job with the FSB after inviting him to eat. During this time, Hei and Misaki are told simultaneously that Izanami has the ability to cause Contractors to commit suicide. Hei refuses Repnin's offer and attacks him, while Tanya summons a swarm of insects to stop the train and escape with Suō. Outside the train, Hei and Suō face off against the FSB force on their own, defeating them. Unknown to Suō, Tanya was killed by Suō's brother Shion from a nearby rooftop. As Tanya floats in the stagnant pool, Suō ponders that she can never return to the innocent summer days she remembers. Suō later heads off to Tokyo with Mao and July on their own without Hei to guide them.
35	9	"They Met One Day, Unexpectedly"; Transliteration: "Deai wa Aru Hi Totsuzen ni" (Japanese: 出会いはある日突然に)	Keisuke Onishi	Shinsuke Onishi	December 4, 2009	October 1, 2010
As Suō and July ride a train through Tokyo Suō collapses from a high fever, waking up in a bedroom. Gai Kurasawa and Kiko Kayanuma decide to help Suō search Tokyo for Suō's mother, but with little success. Misaki finds a recording by Amber which instructs her to find a certain CD, which informs her that Izanami will eventually meet Izanagi, at which point Hell's Gate will open. Following the advice of Madame Oreille, Suō proceeds to an airport to find her mother. At the airport, Hei appears and kidnaps Yōko, easily evading Genma and Mina while escaping. Suō's mother cries upon meeting Suō in the airport, believing she is her twin brother Shion. In a car, Suō tries to explain that she is not Shion, but her mother dismisses this saying that Suō died eight years ago.
36	10	"Your Smile on a False Street Corner"; Transliteration: "Itsuwari no Machikado ni Kimi no Hohoemi o" (Japanese: 偽りの街角に君の微笑みを)	Nao Higa	Mari Okada	December 11, 2009	October 8, 2010
Suō tries to remind her mother of the happy time they visited the aquarium, but flees when she denies it. Misaki finds Suō in the cold and explains that the aquarium she remembers was demolished thirteen years ago. Suō's mother recounts to Misaki that day eight years ago in Moscow when she took Suō and Shion to see her husband Dr. Pavlichenko at the university; Mao was also present then and lost his body in the explosion. Suō's mother remembers seeing her husband manipulating Suō in an ME machine, then fleeing with Suō's lifeless body while Shion watched her leave from a window, having chosen to stay behind with his father. Shion reveals his ability: he can create a copy of any object or organism, albeit an imperfect one. Hei rejoins Suō, July, and Mao after incapacitating Misaki. Mina vows to kill Hei upon finding Yōko's bloody corpse.
37	11	"The Sea Floor Dries Up, and the Moon Grows Full"; Transliteration: "Suitei wa Kawaki, Tsuki wa Michiru" (Japanese: 水底は乾き、月は満ちる)	Hideyo Yamamoto	Shōtarō Suga	December 18, 2009	October 15, 2010
Hei decides to leave for a while to settle his own problems. After which, Suō decides to do the same, of which she goes to find her father and asks him about her. Suō, Mao, and July go to the aquarium in the abandoned district of Ikebukuro, and they find Dr. Pavlichenko there. He tells Suō the truth about the meteor incident that year and about Shion's ability to create copies. On the other hand, MIAC commandos head for the aquarium in and Genma bumps into Suō and her group. Misaki encounters Madame Oreille, and she tells her to follow because there will be a bloodbath soon. Suō and the gang escapes, while Pavlichenko later gets wounded by a Section 3 Contractor while trying to protect Suō. They hide somewhere in Ikebukuro while Genma calls for Suō. Meanwhile, Hei tries to find Yin, but was surprised to see the container empty. Back at Hell's Gate, Misaki meets with Mao and July, only to have found that Suō disappeared.
38	12	"Ark of Stars"; Transliteration: "Hoshi no Hakobune" (Japanese: 星の方舟)	Tensai Okamura	Shōtarō Suga	December 25, 2009	October 22, 2010
Hei and the rest of Section 3 continue to secure Izanami from American forces after they have launched a military operation to secure the Greater Tokyo Area for their government's use. Genma reveals his allegiance to the CIA, having been a double agent for them and the MIAC. Misaki goes on with Mao to find a way to handle Izanami, wondering whether their actions will either save the world or bring it to ruin forever. However, Madame Oreille reveals details that ties to the problems the MIAC and Suō had been facing before Misaki and Mao. After the American military successfully secures the Greater Tokyo Area, Misaki and Kobayashi go underground to escape detention from the hands of American troops while Hazuki goes MIA after her fight with Genma and his American escorts. Meanwhile, Shion uses the last of his Contractor powers to help Suō after they meet in Hell's Gate.

== Home media release ==
Aniplex

Vol.	Episodes	Blu-ray / DVD artwork	Release date	Ref.
1	1, 2	Hei	December 23, 2009	
2	3, OVA	Suo Pavlichenko	January 27, 2010	
3	4, 5	August 7	February 24, 2010	
4	6, OVA	Yin	March 24, 2010	
5	7, 8	Misaki Kirihara	April 21, 2010	
6	9, OVA	Hei	May 26, 2010	
7	10, 11	Shion Pavlichenko	June 23, 2010	
8	12, OVA	Hei and Suo Pavlichenko	July 21, 2010	

North America

Name	Date	Discs	Episodes
Darker than Black: Gemini of the Meteor + OVAs	November 8, 2011	5	1–12, OVAs
