= Darker than Black season 1 =

Darker than Black
- Season 1
- DVD box released by Funimation in North America on April 19, 2011.
- No. of episodes: 25 + OVA

Release
- Original network: MBS
- Original release: April 6 – September 28, 2007

Season chronology
- Next → Gemini of the Meteor

Darker than Black is a 2007 Japanese anime series created by Tensai Okamura. Set in modern Japan, the narrative focuses on how ten years prior to the events of series, a mysterious spatial anomaly known as "Heaven's Gate" appeared in South America, shortly followed by the opening of "Hell's Gate" in Tokyo altering the sky and wreaking havoc on the landscape. During this time, people possessing various special abilities emerged, each capable of different supernatural feats—these are known as contractors. The series follows the exploits of agents Hei and his comrades of the Syndicate organization operating in a post-apocalyptic Tokyo and their mission to uncover the mysteries of the Hell's Gate.

Darker than Black was first announced in December 2006 though the first trailer was revealed in March 2007. The 25-episode anime was produced by Bones. It was directed and written by Tensai Okamura, along with character designs drawn by Takahiro Komori and based on the original designs by Yuji Iwahara, art direction by Takashi Aoi, sound direction by Kazuhiro Wakabayashi and soundtrack music composed by Yoko Kanno. The series was broadcast on MBS between April 6 and September 28, 2007, and aired later on HBC, CBC, TBS and Animax.

Aniplex released the complete series in Japan on nine DVD volumes between July 25, 2007, and March 26, 2008. The ninth DVD volume also included an unaired 26th original video animation episode. Aniplex later compiled the series in a Blu-ray box set released in Japan on September 30, 2009. The series was also licensed by Funimation for an English release in Region 1. Funimation released the series in six DVD volumes between November 25, 2008, and August 11, 2009. Funimation later released the series in a DVD box set on April 19, 2011, in Region 1. Manga Entertainment released the series in the United Kingdom as a compilation, and Madman Entertainment licensed it in Australia.

The series uses four pieces of theme music: two opening themes and two ending themes. "Howling" by Abingdon Boys School was used as the opening theme for the first 14 episodes while "Kakusei Heroism (The Hero Without a "Name")" by An Cafe was used as the second opening theme from episodes 15 onwards. "Tsukiakari" (ツキアカリ; lit. 'Moonlight') by Rie fu was used as the ending theme for the first 14 episodes while "Dreams" by High and Mighty Color was used as the second ending theme from episodes 15 onwards.

== Episode list ==
No.	Title	Directed by	Written by	Original release date	English air date
1	"The Fallen Star of a Contract (Part 1)"; Transliteration: "Keiyaku no Hoshi wa Nagareta (Zenpen)" (Japanese: 契約の星は流れた(前編))	Tensai Okamura	Tensai Okamura	April 6, 2007	June 16, 2010
The Tokyo police attempt to arrest French agent "Louis", but he escapes using gravitational power, revealing himself to be a Contractor. He lands a short distance away; but while attempting to complete his payment, he is confronted by a mysterious masked man—the Reaper—who easily defeats him and demands to know the location of a "package". After the defeated man reveals that a girl named Chiaki knows the location of "it", the masked man, Hei, kills him. Still in pursuit, the Public Security Bureau Section 4 chief, Misaki Kirihara, is informed of the man's death and discovers his identity as a DGSE agent. She later discusses the man's death with her police squad. Following a lead, Yūsuke Saitō and Yutaka Kōno, members of the squad hang out in a hostess bar and end up pursuing a girl they believe to be Chiaki Shinoda. Hei, under the alias Li, manages to save her from the police. When Chiaki meets up with her supposed allies, she is nearly kidnapped, although Li manages to free her. In the ensuing chase, another French Contractor punches Li over the railing of a bridge and knocks Chiaki out with chloroform, capturing her. She escapes from her kidnappers with the assistance of a small cat and meets up with Li again, collapsing into his arms.
2	"The Fallen Star of a Contract (Part 2)"; Transliteration: "Keiyaku no Hoshi wa Nagareta (Kōhen)" (Japanese: 契約の星は流れた(後編))	Takefumi Anzai	Tensai Okamura	April 13, 2007	June 17, 2010
Li brings Chiaki back to her apartment and she tells him about Contractors. When they return to her room, they find it ransacked by the men chasing after Chiaki. Chiaki asks to stay in Li's room and they spend time there together until the police arrive to investigate. They go out to eat in a diner, but are interrupted when Chiaki's pursuers appear and attack them. They escape, but Li is injured as they run. Chiaki reveals her story to Li and entrusts him with the package that everyone is seeking. The following morning, while on the run from their pursuers, Li causes Chiaki to collapse and escapes in the ensuing chaos. Now dressed as the Reaper, Hei reveals that he is the Contractor who killed Louis before fighting the pursuers. He is shot while protecting Chiaki, who is revealed to be a Doll with the memories of the already dead Chiaki. He still manages to defeat the other contractors, though "Chiaki" sacrifices her life to save him in the process.
3	"A New Star Shines in the Dawn Sky (Part 1)"; Transliteration: "Shinsei wa Shinonome no Sora ni Kirameku (Zenpen)" (Japanese: 新星は東雲の空に煌く(前編))	Shingo Kaneko	Yuuichi Nomura	April 20, 2007	June 18, 2010
A man, the only survivor of his expedition, explores the interior of the Gate and discovers a glowing flower. In the present day, Li has breakfast and stops by a small store. A schoolgirl, Mai Kashiwagi, misses her train in the morning. Li checks into a construction site to begin work and meets Kōzō Tahara, the man from the Gate expedition. Two men, monitored by Huang, check into a hotel and reveal their plans to use force to convince Tahara to obey them. Mai awakens in front of a fire and is sent home from her school. When Li attempts to drive her home, she escapes and runs off with friends. Hei later makes contact with her and entertains her. However, they are attacked as they travel through the city. Mai reacts and an inferno is seen in her eyes as Kirihara is informed of a new star.
4	"A New Star Shines in the Dawn Sky (Part 2)"; Transliteration: "Shinsei wa Shinonome no Sora ni Kirameku (Kōhen)" (Japanese: 新星は東雲の空に煌く(後編))	Tomoko Hiramuki	Yuuichi Nomura	April 30, 2007	June 21, 2010
The aftermath of Mai's reaction reveals that she has become a Moratorium. The collective groups pursuing Mai change their plans and her continued impulses cause additional infernos. Kanami Ishizaki, Kirihara's high school friend, discusses the Moratorium with Kirihara. During the full-scale civilian evacuation, Mai reacts again and accidentally kills her friend Yuka and her father. When the police move to retrieve her, they are attacked by Luco, a contractor. He kidnaps Mai and they use her to force Tahara to reveal his research. Tahara tells Hei of the research, but Hei leaves in disgust to retrieve Mai. He is defeated when Mai's kidnappers threaten Mai's life, but Tahara arrives, hands over the remains of his research, and attempts to kill Mai. Luco kills Tahara, and is killed by Hei in return. Mai transforms fully into a Contractor and is sent off to the Syndicate.
5	"Red Giant over Eastern Europe (Part 1)"; Transliteration: "Saiyaku no Akaki Yume wa Tōō ni Kiete (Zenpen)" (Japanese: 災厄の紅き夢は東欧に消えて(前編))	Takefumi Anzai	Shōtarō Suga	May 4, 2007	June 22, 2010
After a trade between a mafia group and a man goes bad, the man uses his Contractor abilities to kill the gang. When the boss attempts to escape, the other man is aided by another Contractor. The Contractors are revealed to be MI6 operatives, led by November 11. He and the other contractor, April, retrieve a woman named Havoc. A former Contractor, Havoc is taken in to be researched and examined. She is then transported with the help of Kirihara and the Tokyo police. However, the transport, a helicopter, is really a ruse to draw the attacks of other organizations pursuing Havoc. November 11 reveals that he hid Havoc in Kirihara's car, but they are soon attacked by Hei and his team, and Havoc is taken. However, when Huang checks in with Hei, he discovers that Hei has left with Havoc to interrogate her.
6	"Red Giant over Eastern Europe (Part 2)"; Transliteration: "Saiyaku no Akaki Yume wa Tōō ni Kiete (Kōhen)" (Japanese: 災厄の紅き夢は東欧に消えて(後編))	Hideyo Yamamoto	Shōtarō Suga	May 11, 2007	June 23, 2010
Hei interrogates Havoc as to the whereabouts of Amber and Bai, Hei's younger sister, but Havoc does not remember the day they were separated and she lost her powers, and instead tells him about how she was taken in by a Romanian family following that day. Kirihara and Saitō set off to re-capture Havoc, and November 11 and the MI6 agents step in to volunteer their services. Havoc offers to help Hei by approaching the Gate and recovering her memories and powers, but that leads to her wanting Hei to kill her, only to be killed by November 11 instead. November 11 wants to learn more about Hei and who he works for, but Hei disappears before November 11 can get any information. Huang and Mao then confront Hei, asking why he disobeyed orders and left to take Havoc to the Gate.
7	"The Scent of Gardenias Lingers in the Summer Rain (Part 1)"; Transliteration: "Samidare ni Kuchinashi wa Kaori o Hanachi (Zenpen)" (Japanese: 五月雨にクチナシは香りを放ち(前編))	Shingo Kaneko	Shinsuke Onishi	May 18, 2007	June 24, 2010
Gai Kurasawa, a private detective, and his partner Kiko Kayanuma, a young girl, are hired by the widow of a cosmetics company executive to search for her lost black cat. On multiple occasions, Kurasawa ends up bumping into Hei, who is on the search for the Contractor killing employees from the very same company, making Kurasawa begin to be suspicious of Hei. Kurasawa then accidentally takes the jacket of that Contractor, although he hasn't realized it, while on his way to a house upon the suggestion of his client. There, he finds a black cat (Mao) and captures it, but also unexpectedly comes across the skeleton of a long dead woman.
8	"The Scent of Gardenias Lingers in the Summer Rain (Part 2)"; Transliteration: "Samidare ni Kuchinashi wa Kaori o Hanachi (Kōhen)" (Japanese: 五月雨にクチナシは香りを放ち(後編))	Kei Tsunematsu	Shinsuke Onishi	May 25, 2007	June 25, 2010
Kurasawa continues his investigation, even suspecting his own client of murder, while Hei continues to go after the body-switching Contractor. Mao, who temporarily switches bodies with a crow and nearly drowns in the process. The dead body from the previous episode is the first wife. The widow discovered the first wife's death 6 months prior, but leaves the first wife's body to rot as a revenge, due to the fact that her late husband, Yuzuki loved the smell of the first wife's body sent, even after their divorce. Hei kills the contractor with the body switching power. It is strongly implied that the contractor Hei killed is actually Yuzuki, due to his obsession with scent, even smelling an old sock right before he dies.
9	"The White Dress, Stained with the Girl's Dreams and Blood (Part 1)"; Transliteration: "Junpaku no Doresu wa Shōjo no Yume to Chi ni Somaru (Zenpen)" (Japanese: 純白のドレスは少女の夢と血に染まる(前編))	Takefumi Anzai	Kurasumi Sunayama	June 1, 2007	June 28, 2010
Kirihara, who is investigating a string of murders, ends up at the birthday party of her high school classmate, Alice Wang, who is the daughter of the boss of the Hong Kong mafia, Qing Long Tang. The party is actually a cover for an emergency board meeting related to the deaths of several Qing Long Tang executives, and Hei is also in attendance, posing as a waiter. With the Contractor, named Wei Zhijun, on her side, Alice eliminates Qing Long Tang, but Kirihara is also on her list.
10	"The White Dress, Stained with the Girl's Dreams and Blood (Part 2)"; Transliteration: "Junpaku no Doresu wa Shōjo no Yume to Chi ni Somaru (Kōhen)" (Japanese: 純白のドレスは少女の夢と血に染まる(後編))	Shingo Kaneko	Kurasumi Sunayama	June 8, 2007	June 29, 2010
Hei and Kirihara barely escape from Alice, but Hei goes his own way after reuniting Kirihara with Saitō and goes after the crystal in the stone flower garden. He runs into Wei and loses the crystal in the process. Wei then meets up with Alice, but decides to eliminate her first before going after Kirihara and Saitō.
11	"When One Takes Back What Was Lost Within the Wall (Part 1)"; Transliteration: "Kabe no Naka, Nakushita Mono o Torimodosu Toki (Zenpen)" (Japanese: 壁の中、なくしたものを取り戻すとき(前編))	Daisuke Chiba	Shōtarō Suga	June 15, 2007	June 30, 2010
Hei has been asked to infiltrate PANDORA Institute, which is located in the vicinity of the Gate, and retrieve a Meteor Fragment, which even the CIA is after. There, he meets a man named Nick Hillman, and they find that they share the same dream of seeing the real stars.
12	"When One Takes Back What Was Lost Within the Wall (Part 2)"; Transliteration: "Kabe no Naka, Nakushita Mono o Torimodosu Toki (Kōhen)" (Japanese: 壁の中、なくしたものを取り戻すとき(後編))	Hideyo Yamamoto	Shōtarō Suga	June 22, 2007	July 1, 2010
Hei discovers that Nick is a Contractor with powers similar to his own. Hei follows Nick into Hell's Gate, where Nick transforms and Hei recovers the Meteor Fragment.
13	"A Heart Unswaying on the Water's Surface (Part 1)"; Transliteration: "Gin'iro no Yoru, Kokoro wa Suimen ni Yureru Koto Naku (Zenpen)" (Japanese: 銀色の夜、心は水面に揺れることなく(前編))	Takefumi Anzai	Shinsuke Onishi	June 29, 2007	July 2, 2010
Many years ago Yin, also called Kirsi, is playing the piano under the watch of her teacher, Eelis Kastinen. In the present, Yin has apparently run away. Kurasawa and Kiko are asked by Kastinen to look for Yin.
14	"A Heart Unswaying on the Water's Surface (Part 2)"; Transliteration: "Gin'iro no Yoru, Kokoro wa Suimen ni Yureru Koto Naku (Kōhen)" (Japanese: 銀色の夜、心は水面に揺れることなく(後編))	Shingo Kaneko	Shinsuke Onishi	July 6, 2007	July 5, 2010
It is revealed that many years ago, Yin's father died in a plane crash. On the night of his funeral, Yin walks in on her mother developing romantic affections for her piano teacher, Kastinen. Yin runs out and is almost struck by a truck, before her mother pushes Yin out of the way, which kills her instead. Kastinen tells Yin to return home with him, but Yin refuses, claiming that she wants to be by Hei's side.
15	"Memories of Betrayal in an Amber Smile (Part 1)"; Transliteration: "Uragiri no Kioku wa Kohakuiro no Hohoemi (Zenpen)" (Japanese: 裏切りの記憶は琥珀色の微笑み(前編))	Satoshi Toba	Yuuichi Nomura	July 13, 2007	July 6, 2010
April spots Amber and Maki, two operatives of the Evening Primrose, and ends up in a non-fatal explosion. Meanwhile, the city is spiraling out of control as a chain of terrorist attacks occur, the culprit being Maki, on several foreign embassies, which allows the Evening Primrose to steal the Meteor Fragment. November 11, wanting revenge, chases down Amber. Hei, also wanting revenge, chases after her as well.
16	"Memories of Betrayal in an Amber Smile (Part 2)"; Transliteration: "Uragiri no Kioku wa Kohakuiro no Hohoemi (Kōhen)" (Japanese: 裏切りの記憶は琥珀色の微笑み(後編))	Daisuke Chiba	Yuuichi Nomura	July 20, 2007	July 7, 2010
Madam Stargazer finally speaks, giving vague information on the Evening Primrose. November 11 kills Maki in a final showdown as Hei finally reaches Amber, who has taken Yin. Kirihara also arrives at their location, but, with the help of Amber's Contractor powers, everyone escapes.
17	"A Love Song Sung from a Trash Heap (Part 1)"; Transliteration: "Hakidame de Rabu Songu o Utau (Zenpen)" (Japanese: 掃きだめでラブソングを歌う(前編))	Takefumi Anzai	Kurasumi Sunayama	July 27, 2007	July 8, 2010
Hei meets Kenji Sakurai of the Nakazawa Family, a clumsy yet ambitious young man. New characters are introduced who live in Hei's apartment building. Later, Kenji is given the assignment of taking care of a Doll by Hitotsubashi, his boss. Hei, Mao, Yin, and Huang try to find the Doll, who is conveniently in the hands of Kenji.
18	"A Love Song Sung from a Trash Heap (Part 2)"; Transliteration: "Hakidame de Rabu Songu o Utau (Kōhen)" (Japanese: 掃きだめでラブソングを歌う(後編))	Eiichi Kuboyama	Kurasumi Sunayama	August 3, 2007	July 9, 2010
Kenji falls for the Doll, and they try to run away together with Hei's help. While out shopping, Hei is nearly identified by Kirihara as BK-201, but Kirihara doesn't see the relation between Li Sheng Shun and BK-201. Later, Kenji is caught and nearly killed by Hitotsubashi when Hei saves him. Kenji and the Doll successfully run away.
19	"Dreaming Shallow, Uninebriated (Part 1)"; Transliteration: "Asaki Yumemishi, Yoi mo Sezu (Zenpen)" (Japanese: あさき夢見し、酔いもせず(前編))	Shingo Kaneko	Shinsuke Onishi	August 10, 2007	July 12, 2010
Hei is sent to infiltrate a religious organization and kill the prophet, named Alma. He is aided by an insider, another Contractor, named Shihoko Kishida, whom Huang appears to know. Amagiri and Alma appear to be in cahoots with Alma providing him with Dolls. A well-meant mistake on Huang's part leads to Shihoko's capture.
20	"Dreaming Shallow, Uninebriated (Part 2)"; Transliteration: "Asaki Yumemishi, Yoi mo Sezu (Kōhen)" (Japanese: あさき夢見し、酔いもせず(後編))	Daisuke Chiba	Shinsuke Onishi	August 17, 2007	July 13, 2010
The Syndicate orders Huang to kill Shihoko, and as a secondary directive secretly orders Mao and Hei to kill Alma, and also Huang if he fails. In Huang's past we see him falling for Shihoko, and then Shihoko killing his then police partner Isozaki. Isozaki's wife's memory is wiped by the M.E., and Huang is drafted into The Syndicate. He is unable to kill Shihoko, and asks Hei to kill them both. Hei tries to help them run away while Mao refuses to have any involvement. When they arrive at the docks to wait for a boat, Shihoko sees someone from The Syndicate and realizes they cannot escape. For love of Huang, she runs into the path of an oncoming truck and dies.
21	"City Under Crackdown, Moist with Tears (Part 1)"; Transliteration: "Shukusei no Machi wa Namida ni Nurete (Zenpen)" (Japanese: 粛正の街は涙に濡れて(前編))	Satoshi Toba	Shōtarō Suga	August 31, 2007	July 14, 2010
A doctor, named Dr. Schroeder, is abducted by agents of the Evening Primrose, while the American embassy in Tokyo suffers attack from Hei and his team. A new Contractor with the power to teleport herself and others appears as a double agent for the Evening Primrose. Wei reappears, but is scarred from his last encounter with Hei. Kirihara enters the embassy compound only to be detained by PANDORA, and Mao is discovered by Amber. November 11 leaves the MI6 Secret Intelligence Service for the Evening Primrose.
22	"City Under Crackdown, Moist with Tears (Part 2)"; Transliteration: "Shukusei no Machi wa Namida ni Nurete (Kōhen)" (Japanese: 粛正の街は涙に濡れて(後編))	Hideyo Yamamoto	Shōtarō Suga	September 7, 2007	July 15, 2010
Mao is taken by Amber to the headquarters of the Evening Primrose. While there, Amber calls a meeting for all of the leading Contractors of the Evening Primrose, including Mao, and Dr. Schroeder. She reveals that there was a plan to destroy the South American Gate, which would have led to the eventual disappearance of all Contractors worldwide. Dr. Schroeder notes that the plan was interrupted by a mysterious blue light. November 11 meets the head of East Asian MI6 operations, who is revealed to be a member of The Syndicate, and they kill each other. Hei attacks the Evening Primrose to rescue Mao. Hei uses his powers on Amber while Amber activates her meteor fragment, resulting in the illumination of the whole building in a blue light.
23	"God is In His Heaven"; Transliteration: "Kami wa Ten ni Imashi" (Japanese: 神は天にいまし)	Takefumi Anzai	Shinsuke Onishi	September 14, 2007	July 16, 2010
Eric Nishijima is using a particle accelerator to wipe out the Contractors. Amber gathers numerous Contractors to destroy the accelerator, and Dolls to be used for some other unknown reason. Nijishima, revealed to work with The Syndicate, places a phone call to eliminate Hei and his team. Amber sends a message to Hei via Wei, telling him to meet her in the Gate. Hei agrees and thus Huang, Mao, and Yin assist Hei to infiltrate Hell's Gate with Wei's guidance.
24	"Meteor Shower"; Transliteration: "Ryūseiu" (Japanese: 流星雨)	Daisuke Chiba	Kurasumi Sunayama	September 21, 2007	July 19, 2010
Hei's team, on the orders of Nishijima, has been kicked out of The Syndicate and contracts taken on all their lives. Kirihara discovers that "The Syndicate" is really a collaboration between intelligence agencies of multiple countries and that she herself has been an unknowing member. Hei, Yin, and Mao infiltrate Hell's Gate while Huang detonates a suicide bomb for distraction. Mao is disconnected from The Syndicate's network. As a result, his feral cat behavior takes over, and he runs away. The Contractors of the Evening Primrose launch an attack on PANDORA security forces, leaving the way open for Hei and Yin. The Syndicate takes out the Doll system of the Evening Primrose, leaving Hei with only Yin for guidance as they head towards the interior of Hell's Gate.
25	"Does the Reaper Dream of Darkness Darker than Black?"; Transliteration: "Shinigami no Miru Yume wa, Kuro yori Kurai Kurayami ka?" (Japanese: 死神の見る夢は、黒より暗い暗闇か?)	Tensai Okamura	Shōtarō Suga	September 28, 2007	July 20, 2010
After meeting with Amber, Hei learns that against common knowledge Contractors can become more human than was thought to be possible. Realizing his own position between the world of Contractors and humans, Hei has to make the decisive choice for both. With final farewells to his past comrades inside the Gate, and their support behind his back, Hei's decision brings forth a new future for the world.
26–OVA	"Beneath Cherry Blossoms in Full Bloom"; Transliteration: "Sakura no Hana no Mankai no Shita" (Japanese: 桜の花の満開の下)	Tensai Okamura	Shōtarō Suga	March 26, 2008	July 30, 2010
Mayu Ōtsuka works at the Fourth Foreign Affairs Department in the Japanese National Police Agency as a liaison officer with the National Astronomical Observatory of Japan. She wrote a story about a masked man that supposedly seemed to be a dream, but she isn't sure. Hei and his team got themselves a new task and are looking for a numeric password attached to a sample. A Contractor took it from the Gate and buried it under a cherry blossom tree. As events unfold, Mayu seems to fall in love with Hei, while Saitō struggles to confess his feelings for Kirihara.

== Home media release ==
Aniplex

Vol.	Episodes	Blu-ray / DVD artwork	Release date	Ref.
1	1, 2, 3	Hei	July 25, 2007	
2	4, 5, 6	Yin	August 22, 2007	
3	7, 8	Misaki Kirihara	September 26, 2007	
4	9, 10, 11	Huang	October 24, 2007	
5	12, 13, 14	Hei	November 28, 2007	
6	15, 16	Amber	December 26, 2007	
7	17, 18, 19	Bai	January 23, 2008	
8	20, 21, 22	November 11	February 27, 2008	
9	23, 24, 25	Hei	March 26, 2008	

Funimation Entertainment

Vol.	Episodes	Blu-ray / DVD artwork	Release date	Ref.
1	1-5	Hei	November 25, 2008	
2	6-10	Misaki Kirihara	January 20, 2009	
3	11-14	Yin	March 10, 2009	
4	15-18	November 11	May 5, 2009	
5	19-22	Huang	June 23, 2009	
6	23-26	Amber	August 11, 2009	
Season 1	1-26	Hei	April 19, 2011	
Season 1	1-26		May 26, 2015	
