= Victoria Harwood =

British-born voice actress

- Born: Victoria Claire Harwood
- Education: RADA
- Occupation: Voice actress
- Spouse: William Butler-Sloss
- Children: 2

Victoria Claire Harwood is a British voice actress. She works for anime roles at Geneon Entertainment/New Generation Pictures.

== Biography ==
Harwood was born in Devon, England in 1961 to an English father and Armenian mother (Takouhi Avakian). She grew up from the age of two in Nicosia, Cyprus, where her mother's family had lived since 1936. She moved to London when she was 18.

Harwood started her career as a dancer before moving into television. She appeared in Auf Wiedersehen, Pet as Bettina in 'The Accused' released in 1983. She also appeared in The Adventures of Sherlock Holmes as Sophy Kratides in 'The Greek Interpreter' in 1985. Harwood trained at RADA and worked in theater in London and Europe before marrying film producer William Butler-Sloss. She moved to Hollywood with her husband and two sons, Arum and Roibhilin and continues to work in voice overs. Her best-known role is that of Sir Integra Fairbrook Wingates Hellsing and in The Last Remnant as Roeas.

Harwood's first book The Seamstress of Ourfa, published in 2018, is the first in a trilogy beginning in the Ottoman Empire in 1895 and following four generations of women until the present day.

Her husband William died in 2018.

== Filmography ==
=== Anime ===
- Bayonetta: Bloody Fate - Umbran Elder
- DearS - Rubi
- Hellsing - Sir Integra Fairbrook Wingates Hellsing
- Hellsing Ultimate - Sir Integra Fairbrook Wingates Hellsing
- Monster - English Wife (ep. 20)
- Paranoia Agent - Housewife B
- Strawberry Eggs - Guidance Counselor
- Sid and Nancy - Hermione
- Texhnolyze - Eriko "Doc" Kaneda

=== Video games ===
- The Last Remnant - Roeas
- Valkyrie Profile 2: Silmeria - Roussalier
