= Geneon USA =

American entertainment company

Geneon Entertainment (USA) Inc.
- Trade name: Geneon USA
- Formerly: LaserDisc Corporation of America (1985–1989); Pioneer LDCA (1989–1993); Pioneer Entertainment (1993–2003)
- Type: Subsidiary
- Industry: Entertainment
- Genre: Anime
- Founded: December 1985; 40 years ago
- Founder: Pioneer Corporation
- Defunct: September 27, 2007; 19 years ago
- Fate: Dissolved
- Headquarters: Long Beach, California, U.S.
- Products: Anime; motion pictures; home video
- Services: Broadcasting; Licensing
- Parent: Geneon Entertainment

Geneon Entertainment (USA) Inc. (abbreviated as Geneon USA) was an American anime, multimedia production and distribution company that was owned by Geneon Entertainment. It was primarily involved in the production and distribution of anime from Japan to North America.

The company was founded in December 1985 by Pioneer Corporation, first as LaserDisc Corp. of America, Pioneer LDCA, then Pioneer Entertainment, later Geneon USA), specializing in translating and distributing anime and related merchandise, such as soundtracks across the region. After declining fortunes, it was shut down in 2007, with several of its properties being distributed to other companies, such as Funimation (later Crunchyroll, LLC), Sentai Filmworks, Discotek Media, and Nozomi Entertainment. In 2008, a year after the shutdown of its North American branch, Geneon merged with Universal Pictures Japan to form Geneon Universal Entertainment Japan, LLC; later known as NBCUniversal Entertainment Japan.

== Etymology ==
The name Geneon is a portmanteau of the English words, generate and eon.

== History ==
=== Beginnings ===
In an effort to get into the American business, Pioneer LDC established a subsidiary in an effort to consolidate the Pioneer Video and Pioneer Audio units in December 1985, who maintains the Pioneer Artists label, which was initially based near New Jersey, following the introduction of a combined CD/laserdisc player.

In 1988, it moved LaserDisc's headquarters from the original New Jersey office to Long Beach, California, where Pioneer's American headquarters were based at that time. Also that year, the company started out the Pioneer Special Interests label to release educational and informational laserdisc product that can be used either at classrooms or at home.

In 1989, to reflect its change, its North American division was renamed to Pioneer LDCA. A year later the company acquired a 10% stake in the movie studio Carolco Pictures. Later that year, the company bought out its rights to movies produced by Carolco. In 1991, the company expanded, by launching a line for movies, Pioneer Special Editions, which was devoted to rereleasing classic movies on Laserdisc under license from various studios.

In 1993, Pioneer LDCA, in an effort to boost stronger LaserDisc sales, launched two new labels Pioneer Classics, and Pioneer Animation, the former was devoted to releasing titles with classical music, such as Othello, and the latter will release anime with Japanese and English soundtracks and closed-captioned titles, with Tenchi Muyo! being one of the first anime titles released under the label. Its North American division was later renamed again to Pioneer Entertainment in 1995, in an effort to expand to VHS, karaoke, audio and eventually DVD rights.

Viz Media (then known as Viz Video) made a deal with Pioneer to release Viz's properties to DVD, such as Ranma ½ before Viz began producing their own DVDs. Pioneer also worked with Bandai Entertainment before they started to produce their own DVDs.

On July 21, 2003, after Pioneer LDC was acquired by Japanese advertising and marketing company firm Dentsu and renamed to Geneon, Pioneer Entertainment, was renamed to Geneon Entertainment (USA), Inc.

On November 11, 2004, they signed a deal with Toei Animation to distribute some of their titles into the North American market. Launching titles included Air Master, Interlude, and Slam Dunk. However, on September 18, 2006, the deal ended and all of the released titles went out of print. In 2006, they were named "Best Anime Company" by the Society for the Promotion of Japanese Animation. On March 5, 2007, they became the exclusive North American distributor for Bandai Visual USA.

=== Shutdown ===
On August 29, 2007, Geneon and ADV Films announced a strategic alliance deal where ADV would take over the distribution, marketing, and sales of their properties in the United States, starting October 1, 2007, with Geneon in turn laying off their entire marketing and sales team in preparation for the deal. According to the announcement, they would continue to acquire, license, and produce English subs and dubs of anime for release in North America. However, the deal was canceled in September before it was implemented, with neither company giving details as to why beyond stating they were "unable to reach a mutual agreement".

On September 26, 2007, they announced that they would close distribution operations, with titles solicited through November 5 shipped. Titles that were in mid-release or licensed but unreleased were left in limbo. The Bandai Visual USA titles that were being distributed by Geneon were not affected by this closure, though some were delayed while Bandai Visual found a new distributor. Another North American anime company, Funimation, began negotiating with them to distribute some of the company's licensed titles. In July 2008, a formal arrangement was announced and Funimation acquired the rights to "manufacture, sell, and distribute" various Geneon anime and live-action titles.
