= Kouta Hirano =

Japanese manga artist

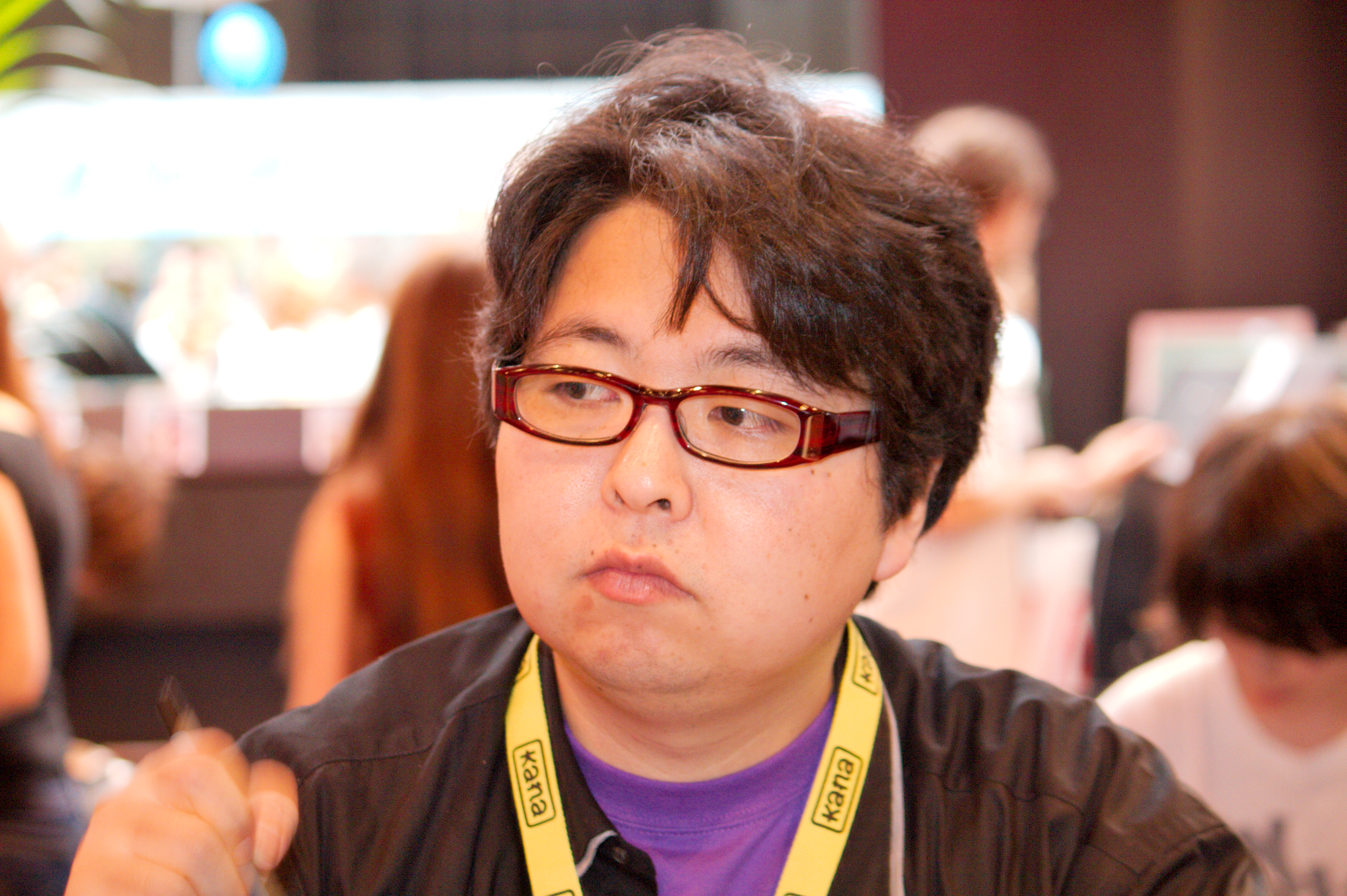
- Hirano at Japan Expo '08
- Born: July 14, 1973 (age 53); Adachi, Tokyo, Japan
- Known for: Graphic novels, manga
- Notable work: Hellsing, Drifters

Kouta Hirano (平野 耕太, Hirano Kōta; born July 14, 1973) is a Japanese manga artist born in Adachi, Tokyo, Japan, most famous for his manga Hellsing and Drifters.

== Career ==
Hirano said he learned how to be a manga artist from reading Akira Toriyama and Akira Sakuma's Hetappi Manga Kenkyūjo. Starting his career first as a manga artist's assistant (self-described as "horrible" and "lazy" in said assistant position), and later a hentai manga artist, he went on to enjoy somewhat limited success with other relatively unknown manga titles such as Angel Dust, Coyote, Gun Mania and Hi-Tension. His first major success came with his manga series Hellsing, which got its start and was subsequently serialized in a monthly manga magazine, Young King OURs, towards the latter half of 1997.

However, Hellsing was not the earliest Hirano series to be published in Young King OURs monthly. In 1996, the same year Hellsing's precursor, The Legends of Vampire Hunter, was first released as a single H short story in Heavenly Pleasure (a monthly H-centric manga magazine), another World War II-based short story named Hi-And-Low was being published in Young King OURs by a then lesser-known Kouta Hirano. The story takes place primarily at a train station in Russia and features two female characters that are strikingly similar to Integra Helsing from Hellsing and Yumiko/Yumie in Crossfire; and who are, in actuality, undercover Axis spies in-league with one another for a common purpose: the success of Operation Barbarossa. This story saw ink in one issue of OURs before being discontinued in favor of Hellsing itself. The original prototype for Hellsing was published in COMIC Kairakuten in October 1996 under the title 'Hellsing.' This is widely regarded as the first and most realised prototype prior to official serialisation.

A number of Hirano's older works are now considered collector's items due to the small number of them that exist. Many characters from Hellsing appear in his previous works and, as mentioned above, there is a rare hentai prototype of Hellsing titled The Legends of (the) Vampire Hunter. At Otakon 2006, he said in an interview that in about a year and a half to two years, he will finish Hellsing and move on to a different project which he says will be kept a secret until the time comes. This statement was proven true when Hellsing ended with 95 chapters in October 2008. Hirano has since begun a new series, Drifters, which was published in April 30's issue of YKO and which Hirano keeps working on to this day.

Hirano has also been part of a doujinshi circle titled GUY-YA, consisting of himself and Read or Die manga artist Shutaro Yamada.

== Works ==
=== Alphabetical list of works ===
- Angel Dust
- Assassin Colosseum
- Be Wild!!
- Bishōnen de Meitantei de Doesu
- Count Pierre Eros' Gorgeous Daily Grind
- Coyote
- Crossfire
- Daidōjin Monogatari
- Deep
- Desert Schutzstaffel
- Drifters
- Doc's story
- Front
- Gun Mania
- Hellsing
  - Hellsing: The Dawn
- Hi-Tension
- Hi-and-Low
- Ikaryaku
- Ikasu Sōtō Tengoku
- karera no Shūmatsu
- Koi no Strikeback
- Mahō no Muteki Kyōshi Kawaharā Z
- Magic School
- Advance! Secret Studies of the Cybernetics Research Division
- Strike Back of Love
- Susume! Ikaryaku
- Susume!! Seigaku Dennō Kenkyūbu
- The Legends of Vampire Hunter
- The Weekenders
- UFO 2000
