= Hellsing =

Japanese manga series

- First tankōbon volume cover, featuring Alucard
- Genre: Action; Dark fantasy; Vampire
- Manga
- Written by: Kouta Hirano
- Published by: Shōnen Gahōsha
- English publisher: AUS: Madman Entertainment; NA: Dark Horse Comics; Digital Manga; SG: Chuang Yi
- Imprint: Young King Comics
- Magazine: Young King OURs
- Original run: April 30, 1997 – September 30, 2008
- Volumes: 10
- Manga

Hellsing: The Dawn
- Written by: Kouta Hirano
- Published by: Shōnen Gahosha
- Magazine: Young King OURs Zōkan
- Original run: March 2002 – March 2006
- Anime adaptations
- Hellsing (2001–02 TV series); Hellsing Ultimate (2006–12 OVA series)
- icon

Hellsing is a Japanese manga series written and illustrated by Kouta Hirano. It was serialized in Shōnen Gahōsha's seinen manga magazine Young King OURs from April 1997 to September 2008, with its chapters collected in ten tankōbon volumes. The series chronicles the efforts of the mysterious and secret Hellsing Organization as it combats vampires, ghouls, and other supernatural foes who threaten England. The series was licensed for an English-language release in North America by Dark Horse Comics. From 2002 to 2006, Hirano released a six-chapter prequel series, Hellsing: The Dawn, in Young King OURs Zōkan (later Young King OURs+ before ceasing publication).

A thirteen-episode anime television series adaptation by Gonzo and Digimation, directed by Umanosuke Iida and Yasunori Urata, with screenplay by Chiaki J. Konaka, was broadcast on Fuji TV from October 2001 to January 2002. A ten-episode original video animation (OVA) adaptation, titled Hellsing Ultimate, was produced by Geneon and released between February 2006 and December 2012. It follows the manga's storyline closer than the TV series.

The manga has sold 4 million copies worlwide. It has been well-received by critics, who have praised its action scenes, storyline, characters, and artwork, although its conclusion received a somewhat polarized response.

== Plot ==
The Hellsing Organization, formally known as the Order of Royal Protestant Knights, is a government agency originally led by Abraham Van Helsing. The mission of the agency is to search for and destroy the undead and other supernatural forces of evil that threaten England. The organization is led by Sir Integra Fairbrook Wingates Hellsing, who inherited the leadership of Hellsing as a child after witnessing her father's murder, which turned her from a kind and innocent young girl into a ruthless and determined woman thoroughly devoted to her new role.

Sir Integra is protected by the faithful Hellsing family butler Walter C. Dornez, a deadly foe in his own right, and Alucard, the original and most powerful vampire, who swore loyalty to the Hellsing family after being defeated by Van Helsing one hundred years before the story takes place. These formidable guardians are joined early on in the storyline by former police officer Seras Victoria, turned into a vampire willingly by Alucard to save her from certain death.

As the scale and frequency of incidents involving the undead escalate in England and all around the world, Sir Integra discovers that the remnants of a Nazi group called Millennium still exist and are intent on reviving Nazi Germany by creating a battalion of vampires. Millennium, Hellsing, and the Vatican section XIII Iscariot clash in an apocalyptic three-sided war in London, and Millennium reveals its true objective: to destroy the vampire lord Alucard, ending a feud begun during World War II.

== Production ==
In 1996, manga author Kouta Hirano published a one-shot titled Hellsing: The Legends of Vampire Hunter in Comic Kairakuten, a hentai magazine issued by Wanimagazine. Hirano later stated that he did not originally intend to create a story in the hentai genre, but rather a "somewhat daring" action narrative. He noted that the one-shot was created quickly, and his ongoing work in hentai facilitated its publication. Subsequently, Hirano developed the concept into a new series, retaining the setting but removing erotic elements to focus on action, which became Hellsing. Due to its unconventional premise, Hirano and publisher Shōnen Gahōsha initially tested reader reception, resulting in a narrative that Hirano described as initially "a little disjointed". After positive feedback, the series was greenlit for serialization.

Hirano aimed to create a story centered on gunplay, but felt that a traditional vampire would be incompatible with firearms. To address this, he redesigned Alucard with a hat and long coat, making him "dark and ominous, but just more suited to his behavior". Hirano emphasized that character design precedes story development for him. He noted that Alucard's design drew comparisons to Vash the Stampede from Trigun (which also ran in Young King OURs), leading him to regret adding sunglasses. To counterbalance the series's dark tone, Hirano introduced Seras Victoria as a female character who could bring warmth and stand out "from the darkness". Hirano commented that he would write each chapter after thinking things over and finalizing the story in his head. He did not make drafts because the story was already set by the time he wrote it. The numerous references to history, mythology, and pop culture in the series were not based on formal research; Hirano described himself as an otaku who incorporated elements from media he consumed passionately.

== Media ==
=== Manga ===
Written and illustrated by Kouta Hirano, Hellsing was serialized for eleven years in Shōnen Gahōsha's seinen manga magazine Young King OURs from April 30, 1997, to September 30, 2008. (Note: It started in the magazine's 27th issue (May 1997 issue), released on April 30, 1997.) Its individual chapters were collected by Shōnen Gahōsha in ten tankōbon volumes, released from September 24, 1998, to March 27, 2009.

In North America, the series was licensed for English release by Dark Horse Comics in 2003. The ten volumes were released from December 1, 2003, to May 19, 2010. In January 2020, Dark Horse Comics announced that they would re-release the series in a three-volume deluxe edition, with over 600 pages each. The volumes were released from July 15, 2020, to June 16, 2021.

Chuang Yi licensed the series in English in Singapore. Madman Entertainment released the series in Australia and New Zealand.

==== Crossfire ====
Crossfire is a three-chapter one-shot story, which was published in the defunct Hobby Japan's magazine Comic Master. It follows Heinkel Wolfe and Yumie Takagi, a Catholic nun and an assassin who work for the Iscariot organization. They call themselves "earthly agents of divine punishment". Crossfire also has cameos by Alexander Anderson and Enrico Maxwell, the head of Iscariot. Across the three chapters, Heinkel and Yumie face a variety of opposition, including Islamic terrorists, communist revolutionaries, and finally, an obscure pagan cult. Crossfire as a side work was discontinued by Kouta Hirano, but was republished in the first three volumes of Hellsing as an extra. Crossfire was adapted into a drama CD and included in the limited edition of the sixth Hellsing Ultimate volume.

==== Hellsing: The Dawn ====
A prequel series, titled Hellsing: The Dawn, was published Young King OURs Zōkan (later Young King OURs+ before being discontinued), with six chapters released from the March 2002 to the March 2006 issues; the series remains incomplete. The Dawn features a fourteen-year-old Walter C. Dornez and Alucard, in the form of a young girl, attacking Millennium's base of operations in Nazi-controlled Poland in September 1944, during the Warsaw Uprising.

=== Anime ===
==== TV series ====
The manga was adapted into a thirteen-episode anime television series by Gonzo and Digimation. The series was directed by Yasunori Urata, under the chief direction of Umanosuke Iida, and written by Chiaki J. Konaka. Although the series uses the same characters and settings as the manga, it follows an original storyline. It was broadcast on Fuji TV from October 11, 2001, to January 17, 2002.

==== Original video animation ====
A second animated adaptation, which adhered more closely to the manga's storyline, was released as an original video animation (OVA) series. Titled Hellsing Ultimate, it consists of ten episodes, animated by Satelight (1–4), Madhouse (5–7),. and Graphinica (8–10), and released from February 10, 2006, to December 26, 2012.

=== Live-action film ===
In March 2021, it was announced that Amazon Studios is developing a live-action film adaptation of Hellsing with scripts by Derek Kolstad. It will be produced by Kolstad, Automatik's Brian Kavanaugh-Jones and Fred Berger, Ranger 7 Films's Mike Callaghan and Reuben Liber, and Soluble Fish Productions' Jason Lust.

== Reception ==
The ten volumes of the Hellsing manga have sold 4 million copies worldwide. In 2005, the sixth and seventh volumes ranked among Diamond Comics Distributors' list of the top 48 manga volumes sold in the United States for the year. In November 2007, the ninth volume was among the top 10 volumes sold according to Japan's monthly sales rankings.

The Hellsing manga received widespread critical attention for its graphic violence, distinctive art style, and darkly comedic tone. Early reviews praised Kouta Hirano's dynamic artwork and over-the-top action, though some critics noted the violence could become repetitive. Animerica commented that Hirano "does violence right", while Publishers Weekly called it "mostly a fun, violent romp" with "goofy details" that added charm. While Sequential Tart found the violence repetitive, AnimeOnDVD enjoyed the consistent action and Alucard's blasé characterization. Slightly Biased Manga praised its balance of violence and artistry, noting it would appeal to readers who enjoy graphic content.

Later volumes garnered stronger praise for their storytelling and character designs. Anime News Network (ANN) highlighted Hirano's "impeccable" narrative craftsmanship, and IGN declared it "the best vampire manga around" for its "seething wit" and gothic flair. However, some critics found the plot derivative or overly reliant on shock value.

While Active Anime and PopCultureShock celebrated its relentless energy, ANN criticized its rushed ending, though still lauded its "demented ultraviolence." Jason Thompson's Manga: The Complete Guide awarded the series 3.5/4 stars, calling it a "masterpiece of fetishistic violence", while his ANN retrospective praised its nihilistic vision as "sincere and original." In a review of the first volume of the deluxe edition, Otaku USA praised Hirano's intricate art.
