= Darker than Black: Shikkoku no Hana =

Japanese manga series

- First tankōbon volume cover featuring Hei (left) and Yin

DARKER THAN BLACK ー漆黒の花ー (Dākā Zan Burakku Shikkoku no Hana)
- Genre: Science fiction
- Manga
- Written by: Yuji Iwahara
- Published by: Square Enix
- Magazine: Young Gangan
- Original run: May 15, 2009 – January 21, 2011
- Volumes: 4
- Related work
- Darker than Black (2007)

Darker than Black: Shikkoku no Hana (Japanese: DARKER THAN BLACK-漆黒の花-, Hepburn: Dākā Zan Burakku Shikkoku no Hana; lit. "Darker than Black: Jet Black Flower") is a Japanese manga written and illustrated by Yuji Iwahara. The series is a spin-off to the 2007 anime series Darker than Black and focuses on Hei, who is in a way to hunt the Canadian Contractor Matthew Edner, also known as a man named Harvest and the "Black Dendelion."

The manga was serialized in Square Enix's seinen manga magazine Young Gangan between May 2009 and January 2011, and collected a total of four tankōbon volumes. Although it was not released in English-speaking regions, the series was popular in Japan, selling several issues and being the subject of positive reviews by Western critics. The characters and artwork were praised, along with the narrative's accessibility to new readers.

== Plot ==
In Tokyo, the assassin Hei who is escaping from the Syndicate group, and Misaki Kirihara from the Metropolitan Police Department are separately investigating the appearance of superpowered soldiers called Contractors. The soldier Harvest is using a power known as the "Black Dendelion", an item that takes the form of a flower and is placed on human bodies to create the Contractors. He eventually makes contact with a young student named Azusa Tsukimori after she is seduced and betrayed by her coach, Daisuke Mioka. Azusa wishes to become a Contractor in order to lose her strong emotions and gain power to exact revenge.

Hei and his partner Yin locate Azusa who kills Mioka. Hei seeks to kill Harvest due to a request from his previous ally, Amber, whom Harvest worked for years ago. After failing to capture his target, Hei meets Champ and Pancel from the Pandora group who save Yin from enemy forces. Hei learns from them that a remnant of the Syndicate is using Harvet's Black Dendelion to create an army of soldiers and is planning to kill Hei for targeting Harvest.

The police manage to defeat Harvest using weapons from Pandora but Harvest escapes. The Syndicate sends soldiers to retrieve the Black Dandelion from Azusa—who is now weakened as a side effect of the flower. Hei and Yin take Azusa to Pandora to treat her. However, Pandora is attacked by several soldiers from the Syndicate, and Hei, Champ, and Parcel fight them off to let the others escape. While Hei and the Pandora soldiers are victorious, Champ dies in the fight. One of the members from the Syndicate attempts to manipulate a Pandora researcher in order to get the Black Dandelion to continue Harvest's plan. However, Pandora betrays the attacking Syndicate scientists.

After Azusa recovers her strength, she joins Hei goes to face Harvest. The enemy has recovered and is using the dendelion to create his own army, and Azusa's schoolmate, Kyoko, is now a Contractor createad through using the dendelion and a supernatural object used as Meteor Fragment. In their fight, Harvest reveals to be a former ally of Amber and is planning to prove his superiority to Hei, using his new powers amplified by the Meteor. As Kirihara controls the Meteor, Kyoko loses her wrath and Azusa bids her farewell to the afterlife. Meanwhile, Hei is assisted by Yin to control his powers to nullify Harvest, whose body is disintegrated. After saying farewell to Parcel, Hei and Yin leave the city, while Azusa asks Kirihara to arrest her for the actions she committed after taking the Black Dandelion.

== Publication ==
Darker than Black: Shikkoku no Hana was written and illustrated by Yuji Iwahara, and was serialized in Square Enix's seinen manga magazine Young Gangan from May 15, 2009, to January 21, 2011. Square Enix collected its chapters in four tankōbon volumes, which were released from October 24, 2009, to March 25, 2011.

=== Volumes ===
No.	Release date	ISBN
1	October 24, 2009	978-4-7575-2706-5
2	March 25, 2010	978-4-7575-2832-1
3	September 25, 2010	978-4-7575-4267-9
4	March 25, 2011	978-4-7575-3177-2

== Reception ==
Although the first volume was not mentioned by Oricon, Darker than Black: Shikkoku no Hana was a commercial success in Japan with the second tankōbon volume selling 60,780 units upon release. The third volume sold 31,248 units upon release and later reached 77,566 units. The fourth and final volume sold 40,496 units upon its release and reached a total of 70,783 units the following week.

Critical response to Shikkoku no Hana was generally positive. Journaldujapon referred to the series as a well-worth buy for fans of the anime, enjoying both original and returning characters which helped the readers immerse themselves in the narrative. Despite Darker than Black being a spin-off of the original series, the narrative was praised by critics for being accessible. Hei's characterization was also praised by Manga News and Manga Sanctuary for his complexity and charisma. However, Manga-News lamented that Harvest's motivations were disappointing, finding him uninteresting for a psychopath as originally introduced. PlaneteBD found the first volume interesting but lamented the inclusion of stereotypes. Manga News enjoyed the number of new characters, since they provide several different subplots.

The art was praised by PlaneteBD as being dynamic and effective. Manga Sanctuary was impressed by the artwork and noted that the color pages were also well done. Manga News stated that Iwahara has completely immersed himself in the universe of Darker Than Black.
