= List of Darker than Black characters =

Most of the major characters from Darker than Black.

The following is a list of characters from the Darker than Black anime series and its spin-offs which were created by Bones.

== Creation and design ==
The main characters in Wolf's Rain are heroic, unlike the violent protagonists in Darker than Black; Tensai Okamura wanted the latter's characters to be flawed, in contrast to those in Wolf's Rain. Character designer Yūji Iwahara inspired Okamura to work on Darker than Black, based on his work on the video game Koudelka and its manga version. The narrative was inspired by Japanese dramas, which were explored in two consecutive episodes. Okamura wanted to give his audience comic and dark stories for variety. Actual locations, including Shinjuku and a police station, were photographed to make the series more realistic. Tensai Okamura found early designs unacceptable; until his image of the characters matched Iwahara's, the pictures were redrawn many times. Iwahara found his work on the anime more challenging than his manga, since he had to keep up with staff requests and had little artistic freedom.

Takahiro Komori adapted Iwahara's work for animation, retaining the essence of the original designs and making the animators' work easier; Huang's hat and Yutaka Kouno's and Mayu Ootsuka's clothing were changed. Color designer Nobuko Mizuta was disappointed because much of the series is set at night and the main characters' clothing is generally dark-colored, but she gave the guest characters brightly-colored clothes. Komori said that when he draws female characters, he pays special attention to the line connecting her buttocks and legs. For the OVAs, Iwahara was given the order to draw both characters Hei and Yin sexually appealing. The animation studio wants the viewer focus on appealing action scenes involving Hei. However, there is a glimpse of the weakness of the character, and a tragic fate for Yin, giving the series a suitable culmination.

== The Syndicate ==
At the beginning of the series, The Syndicate (組織, Soshiki) is introduced as a mysterious underground organization with no apparent objective. Its operatives work with both Contractors and Dolls and even have access to M.E. technology in order to erase sightings of their affairs from witnesses' minds. The Syndicate makes extensive use of "word of mouth" communication in relaying both missions and operative status. In the later course of the show, it is revealed that The Syndicate is in fact merely another façade for a global organization in control of PANDORA, that declares to be looking for stabilizing the world order and destroying Hell's Gate.

At the ending of Gemini of the Meteor, a new Syndicate is established consisting of Misaki, Kobayashi, Mao and Madame Oreille after American occupation forces have subdued the old Syndicate.

Hei (黒(ヘイ); pinyin: Hēi, lit. Black)
Voiced by: Hidenobu Kiuchi (Japanese); Jason Liebrecht (English)

Codename "Hei", he is an elite contractor with the Messier Code BK-201. Hei has a double persona in the series: as a civilian, he is referred to as Li Shun Sheng (李舜生(リ・シェンシュン), Ri Shenshun; pinyin: Lǐ Shùnshēng), a good-natured Chinese exchange student living in an old apartment complex for foreigners and getting by through brief part-time jobs. These are typically related to the current mission he is on. When he is working with the Syndicate, he acts almost exactly as a typical contractor, appearing to be cold and rational. Nonetheless, Hei still demonstrates compassion and sorrow, and these mannerisms are noted as unusual by other contractors. Hei began working with the Syndicate as a child assassin to protect his sister, Bai, in South America during the Heaven's Gate war. Hei's goal is to find her once again. Though he usually calls himself an exchange student, he has never once gone to any University throughout the course of the series, using his title as a student only to gain access to the gate on one occasion.
Yin (銀(イン), In; pinyin: Yín)
Voiced by: Misato Fukuen (Japanese); Brina Palencia (English)
A member of Hei's team, an emotionless spirit medium known as a "Doll". Her power lies in tracking and observation through direct contact with water. Huang mentions that her "program" is a minimal one, incapable of showing emotion or even allowing her to make decisions for herself; however, she later debunks this by making the decision to keep working with Hei and the others when given the choice of leaving, a possible sign of her recovering her humanity. Yin is of Finnish origin and her real name is Kirsi, which is the Finnish diminutive form of either Kirsikka (meaning "cherry") or Christina. She was once a student of a famed Finnish pianist named Eelis Kastinen (or Kostinen, depending on translation; both are Finnish surnames), who slowly started developing a love interest in her mother. Yin's father died in a plane crash; in the aftermath, Yin's mother was left vulnerable and realized her own love for Kastinen. As they were about to kiss one night, Yin saw them, and ran away in shock. She ran onto the street, and was almost run over by an incoming truck, but was saved when her mother pushed her out of the way, trading her own life in the process. Little, if anything, is known about how Yin became a Doll, but it seems to be linked to her personal tragedy.
Amber says both appear to be similar in regards to their feelings towards Hei and asks her to take care of him. Throughout the course of the series, Yin begins to display emotions and her own will, deciding to follow Hei and remain as his partner. This has been made apparent when she called Hei from the void to come back to her and not leave her alone. In the process, her observation apparition evolved or upgraded, now having a human-like body shaped with her silhouette and is capable of physical touch. Episode 2 of Gaiden reveals that "Izanami" possessed Yin during the events of episode 25, which explains her new abilities. In the OVAs, she confesses her love to Hei during Izanami's awakening but both are split since Hei refuses to lose more important people. The two meet again in the Gemini of the Meteor again to prepare to kill Izanami although her fate is unknown.
Huang (黄(ホァン), Hwan; pinyin: Huáng, lit. Yellow)
Voiced by: Masaru Ikeda (Japanese); John Swasey (English)
Huang is the leader of Hei's team, and is usually the one giving orders and explaining the mission to the members of the team. Huang is usually very demanding of everyone on the team and often makes clear his distaste of working with Contractors and Dolls. Aside from being the middle man between the Syndicate and Hei's team, Huang will usually show up to provide backup in situations that would have normally contributed to the loss of a team member. Prior to the start of the series, Huang was a police officer known as Kiyoshi Kuno. He met the Contractor Shihoko, who was the only person that he ever loved. However, she seemingly betrayed him, using his love to extract information from him to kill his partner and erase his partner's wife's memory. After the events, the Syndicate appeared and gave him a choice: join the Syndicate, or have his memories of the event erased. Huang chose the former, but the entire ordeal caused Huang's hatred towards Contractors and Dolls. When he met up with Shihoko again on another mission, Huang learned that she did actually love him, as her payment for being a Contractor was to feel human emotions again. Later on, Huang and the rest of his team are cut out of the Syndicate. Huang later dies while helping Hei and the others get to Hell's Gate, exploding his own car that he drives while leading a large group of officers away from them.
His main weapon is a Beretta M 1934 pistol.
"Huang" is the Mandarin Chinese pronunciation of "黄", literally meaning yellow, while the Japanese pronunciation is "ki".
Mao (猫(マオ); pinyin: Māo, lit. Cat)
Voiced by: Ikuya Sawaki (Japanese); Kent Williams (English)
Mao is a Contractor who has the ability to possess animals, subduing their natural instincts. His Messier code is HM-432. His brain is directly connected to a wireless network which enables him to send and receive information at any time. Mao usually creates diversions for Hei in battle. While on an assignment in Russia following the Pavlichenko family, his human body was destroyed in the explosion that destroyed a laboratory, trapping him in the body of a black cat he was currently possessing. While he completely lost his need to fulfill a payment with the destruction of his body, he must connect periodically with the wireless network or run the risk of having the animal's natural instincts take over. Near the end of the first series, his wireless connection was cut off when he defects from the Syndicate with the rest of his team, resulting in his human consciousness vanishing while in Hell's Gate; however, he manages to reunite with Hei via a backup network under the control of an unknown organization. At the beginning of the second season, he is also in hiding in Russia with Hei and resides in the body of Suoh's pet flying squirrel, Petya.

== Pavlichenko family ==
Pavlichenko siblings during the events of Darker than Black. Shion (left) and Suo (right) with Mao abve Suo.

Suo Pavlichenko (蘇芳・パブリチェンコ, Suō Paburichenko)

Voiced by: Kana Hanazawa (Japanese); Alison Viktorin (English)
A 13-year-old girl who lives in Vladivostok, Russia. In the Gemini of the Meteor story arc, Suoh becomes involved in the war and machinations between the various groups and Contractors, and her life is forever changed when she meets Hei. She also has a younger twin brother, Shion, whom she wants to protect. She is later revealed to have some form of contractor ability when she goes into mental shock. She can manifest an anti-tank rifle (PTRD) from a meteor fragment she wears as a pendant, and can wield the rifle easily despite its heavy weight of the weapon and powerful recoil; however, even though the weapon comes with its own ammunition each time it is created, the wear and tear on it remains, so Suo must maintain it like any other gun. The payment for her power is to fold origami. Her stated goal is to kill all Contractors (though this might have changed due to Hei), and the awakening of her latent powers is referred to by some characters as the "beginning of the end". After meeting her mother, Suoh discovers that she is actually a 'copy' of the original Suoh who died in an explosion many years ago, created by Shion's power. After reuniting with Shion, Suo appears to die after the meteor fragment she is carrying breaks. Later, it is revealed that she has been transported to an alternate world without Contractors (including her brother), where she can live a normal life, with no memory of her previous one.
Shion Pavlichenko (紫苑・パブリチェンコ, Shion Paburichenko)
Voiced by: Hōko Kuwashima (Japanese); Lindsay Seidel (English)
Suoh's younger twin brother, recognized by various organizations as Izanagi, the counterpart to the Izanami entity that has possessed Yin. He was believed to have lost his right eye due to an accident with a falling meteor core fragment during the Tokyo explosion, and that this incident also turned him into a Contractor. It is later revealed that he was in fact born a Contractor, a unique occurrence according to Mao's words, and that the meteorite incident was actually a fake memory he put into his sister's mind. His Contractual payment is to lose the use of his legs every time he uses his power, forcing him to constantly use a wheelchair. His power allows him to create a near-perfect clone of anything, with only one flaw from the original. He leaves behind a clue for Suoh telling her he has left for Japan, which drives her to leave Russia to find him. He is reunited with Suo in Hell's Gate, where he wishes for a world where Suoh can live a normal life before being killed by Izanami.
Dr. Mikhail Pavlichenko (ミハイル・パブリチェンコ博士, Mihairu Paburichenko Hakase)
Voiced by: Katsunosuke Hori (Japanese); Sonny Strait (English)
Suoh and Shion's father, and the husband of Asako Makimiya. Dr. Pavlichenko works for a research group studying the time and space distortion effects occurring on the planet. He also created the memory eraser. He is believed to have been killed by Hei, but it is later revealed that it had just been another of Shion's copies. He used to be involved with The Syndicate, until they decided to pull the plug and bombed his laboratory, accidentally killing Suoh and Mao in the process. Aware that the current Suo is a copy of the original, he still regards and loves her as the daughter she would have become had she lived, rather than as a replica or replacement for the original. After being reunited with Suoh, Dr. Pavlichenko is mortally wounded while rescuing her from government forces and dies.
Asako Makimiya (牧宮 麻子, Makimiya Asako)
Voiced by: Sakiko Tamagawa (Japanese); Anastasia Muñoz (English)
Suoh and Shion's estranged mother, who divorced her husband several years ago. She works as a photographer in Japan and Suoh purchases all of the albums that she makes. When Suoh is reunited with her mother in Japan, Asako initially mistakes her for Shion. When Suoh corrects her, a shocked Asako reveals that Suoh died eight years ago in the laboratory explosion and rejects Suoh, whom Asako has realized is actually a copy of the original Suoh that Shion must have created.

== Tokyo Metropolitan Police Department ==
Its HQ is temporarily located at present day Nippon Telegraph and Telephone East Corporation HQ, 19-2, Nishi-Shinjuku 3-chome, Shinjuku. The real-life MPD HQ at Kasumigaseki is now within the restricted area of the Hell's Gate in the Darker than Black universe.

=== Public Security Bureau Foreign Affairs Section 4 ===
A division with the PSB, dedicated for Contractor-related cases. Due to Hōrai's actions at the ending of Darker than Black, the Japanese government decides to disband the division and reassigned its officers to different divisions within the force.

Misaki Kirihara (霧原 未咲, Kirihara Misaki)
Voiced by: Nana Mizuki (Japanese); Kate Oxley (English)
The Section-Chief of the Foreign Affairs Section 4 who is investigating matters that concern Contractors. Misaki has long brown hair and glasses and rarely smiles or laughs. She has a strong sense of justice and a sharp intuition. Kirihara became a policewoman in order to protect the weak, has a distaste for smokers due to their smell, and is sensitive about the exposure of her body. She likes eating greasy food but claims to stay fit due to constantly moving around every day as part of her job. Her father is Superintendent Supervisor Naoyasu Kirihara of the National Police Agency. It appears that she has feelings for Hei, or at least his civilian alias, Li. After the events of Darker than Black and the Darker than Black: Shikoku no Hana manga, she resigns from the section and relocates to the Hachijo-Jima police station. She is then recruited into Section 3 with the alias of Yayoi Ichinose (一ノ瀬弥生, Ichinose Yayoi).
Yūsuke Saitō (斎藤 雄介, Saitō Yūsuke)
Voiced by: Tomoyuki Shimura (Japanese); Christopher Sabat (English)
A subordinate of Kirihara's, who traditionally wears a business suit. Despite being an officer, he seems to have little common sense as he infiltrated a gang operation undercover using his real name. He admits to finding Kirihara scary, but in the OVA it was revealed that he also harbors more romantic feelings for her. He still works in the Department, but secretly maintains contact with Misaki.
Yutaka Kōno (河野 豊, Kōno Yutaka)
Voiced by: Kōsuke Toriumi (Japanese); Todd Haberkorn (English)
Saito's partner. A reckless, hot-headed officer, who often provides comic relief in the otherwise serious police station.
Kunio Matsumoto (松本 邦夫, Matsumoto Kunio)
Voiced by: Nobuaki Fukuda (Japanese); Kenny Green (English)
The oldest member of Section 4. In the events of Shikoku no Hana, he was severely wounded with his left arm dismembered while being on a Section 4 assignment, forcing Matsumoto to early retirement.
Mayu Ōtsuka (大塚 真由, Ōtsuka Mayu)
Voiced by: Yūna Inamura (Japanese); Leah Clark (English)
Section 4's liaison officer with the Astronomy Bureau. In her private time, she's an otaku who enjoys anime and does anime/manga-based fanfiction stories.

=== Public Security Bureau ===
Yoshimitsu Hōrai (宝来 善充, Hōrai Yoshimitsu)
Voiced by: Michihiro Ikemizu (Japanese); R Bruce Elliott (English)
Misaki's boss; the Chief of the Tokyo Metropolitan Police Department Public Security Bureau. It was revealed in the final episode of Season One that he was a member of the Syndicate, and that he had planned the genocide of contractors with other influential members of the Syndicate.

== National Astronomical Observatory of Japan ==
Its HQ is located at the present day National Astronomical Observatory of Japan, Mitaka Campus, Mitaka. It is affiliated with the Tokyo Metropolitan Police. It monitors and provides information on the actions of the Stars of Contractors in the "false sky". After Darker than Black and Darker than Black: Shikoku no Hana, the entire observatory was officially declared closed with its equipment and personnel taken over by Section 3.

Kanami Ishizaki (石崎 香那美, Ishizaki Kanami)
Voiced by: Sanae Kobayashi (Japanese); Monica Rial (English)
Kirihara's friend since high school and a head staffer at the observatory. In Shikoku no Hana, Kanami relocates to Hawaii after accepting a job there.
Madam Stargazer (星見様, Hoshimi-sama)
Voiced by: Yoshiko Matsuo (Japanese); Juli Erickson (English)
A strange monk who sits in the center of the observatory and appears to be the chief observer of the stars. She speaks riddles or prophecy, and has been seen to be able to speak during Amber's freezing of time.

== Ministry of Internal Affairs and Communications ==
MIAC operatives in Ryusei no Gemini. From left to right: Yoko Sawasaki, Mina Hazuki and Genma Shizume.

In the setting of Darker than Black, the MIAC has a black ops division known as Section 3, created 2 years after the attack on the PANDORA institute to eliminate any individual/group with links to the Syndicate. In addition to its mostly Contractor agents, Section 3 has a covert paramilitary commando force armed with small arms, such as the MP5 submachine gun, and tactical gear.

Gorō Kobayashi (小林 吾朗, Kobayashi Gorō)
Voiced by: Ryūzaburō Ōtomo (Japanese); Jason Douglas (English)
Head of the 2nd Investigate Division of the MIAC's Statistics Bureau. However, the position is merely a cover as head of Section 3. After the United States invades Tokyo and takes over the Gate, Gorō goes underground with Misaki.
Genma Shizume (鎮目 弦馬, Shizume Genma)
Voiced by: Kenta Miyake (Japanese); Newton Pittman (English)
A representative working for the Third Chief Clerk in the 2nd Investigative Division of the Statistics Bureau in the MIAC, as well as a Contractor. Despite his status as a contractor, Genma has a habit of saying some odd things, many of them implying he is a sexual deviant. He is shown to be fairly bumbling as well, as he is the only one who still believes Suo is Shion. His ability allows him to cover his body with whatever material he touches in order to form tank armour, taking from the object until he is sufficiently covered. His armored form enhances the power of his punches and protects him from bullets. His remuneration is to have moxibustion treatment each time his power is used. It is later revealed that he is a double agent for the CIA, and is responsible for Yōko's death. He is killed by Mina who stabs him through the head with her sword.
Mina Hazuki (葉月 水無, Hazuki Mina)
Voiced by: Mitsuki Saiga (Japanese); Kara Edwards (English)
A colleague of Genma's, Mina is a Contractor with the ability to charge any object with energy, which she uses to create potent projectiles from scraps and turn her sword. She also uses retractable wires similar to Hei's. Her remuneration is to passionately kiss a man, which she appears to dislike due to "bad aftertaste"; such is her distaste that with even two mouth washings, she resorts to kissing another woman to remove the taste, though she hints to having an interest in women. She seems to specialize in wetwork, wearing a half-faced balaclava and wielding a wooden katana (which she transforms using her ability). After killing Genma in revenge for Yōko's death, Mina disappears.
Yōko Sawasaki (沢崎 耀子, Sawasaki Yōko)
Voiced by: Kozue Yoshizumi (Japanese); Tia Ballard (English)
A staff member of the MIAC team with Genma and Mina. She usually performs support duties such as driving them around or tapping radio communications. She is captured by Hei, who interrogates her for Yin's location. She is murdered by Genma by putting her through ME Squeezer and probably also by torturing her in the process, as her body is left severely beaten, unlike Pavlichenko's.
Michiru (ミチル)
Voiced by: Marika Hayashi (Japanese); Elise Baughman (English)
An agent of Section 3. She was formerly a housewife to a local restaurant owner named Lebanon, who left him and their son Norio after turning to a Contractor by unknown means. She can manipulate a water source as a weapon and her remuneration is to bake cakes. She loses control of her powers in a battle with Suoh, due to Yin's apparent interference, and dies drowning in a sphere of water.

== Secret Intelligence Service ==
Like its real-life counterpart, its HQ is located at Vauxhall Cross. British Intelligence originally sent three operatives to Japan to retrieve Havoc. There are five known members:

November 11 (ノーベンバー11, Nōbembā Irebun)
Voiced by: Kazuhiko Inoue (Japanese); Troy Baker (English)
MI6's top agent, and a field leader whose civilian alias is Jack Simon. November 11 is charged with investigating BK-201 and his cohorts. November's ability enables him to freeze liquids, including blood in the human body he does not have direct contact with. He is able to shape water into projectiles by freezing it and subsequently hurl them with lethal precision. November 11 has a strong aversion to tobacco, though to his dismay, his remuneration is smoking cigarettes. Through the series, he develops a close professional relationship with Misaki. After he discovers the true motives of the organization he works for he confronts Decade, becoming fatally wounded in the process. He later dies on the street after leaving a voice message on April's phone.
April (エイプリル, Eipuriru)
Voiced by: Takako Honda (Japanese); Nazia Chaudhry (English)
A woman who supports November 11. Her power creates hurricanes which result in downpours, coating everything in water so that November 11 can freeze it. She can also control water more precisely, being able to engulf a person's head in water to drown him or her. Her remuneration is to drink beer, specifically Guinness Stout in the anime. In contrast to November 11, she very much enjoys her remuneration due to her love for alcohol. She dies at the hands of Hei in the first episode of Gemini of the Meteor.
July (ジュライ, Jurai)
Voiced by: Kiyomi Asai (Japanese); Cherami Leigh (English)
A young child most often seen being led around by April. He is a Doll whose observation powers rely on glass as a medium. He considers November and April to be his friends, a fact that initially astonishes Misaki and November as dolls are not supposed to think outside of their programming. April and July frequently visit November 11's roadside site of death with offers of a bouquet or cigarettes and a beer or two. In the third episode of the 2nd season, July assists Suoh by helping her direct her new-found powers against the FSB and the MIAC, and later joins up with Hei's group, although his motivations for joining them remain unclear. After he and Suo are killed by Izanami, they are both seen in the alternate world Shion created, with July being a normal boy instead of a doll.
Decade (ディケイド, Dikeido)
Voiced by: Akio Nojima (Japanese); Sean Hennigan (English)
A member of the Secret Intelligence Service (MI6). November 11's superior. He is killed by November 11 in Episode 22 after November discovers Decade's involvement in the massive effort to destroy Hell's Gate.
August 7 (オーガスト7, Ōgasuto Sebun)
Voiced by: Masaya Matsukaze (Japanese); Gregory Lush (English)
Appearing in the Gemini of the Meteor story arc, August 7 is a Contractor who works at MI6. He has the ability to distort space around himself, allowing him to pull weapons out of thin air, as well as dodge bullets and knives. His remuneration is revealing the secrets of a magic trick. He is also nicknamed "Magician", and he wears a red coat and a black silk top hat. After April's death, August goes after Hei and Suo, but encounters the FSB. He dispatches the FSB agents easily and continues his pursuit, where he has a showdown with Hei. He is defeated and electrocuted by Hei, although he remains barely alive. Genma Shizume apparently finishes him off after Hei and Suoh escape into the sea. In episode 12, he is still alive, appearing in Hell's Gate and asking July to return to MI6 due to the cancellation of their mission, and leaving without the latter when July refused to leave, amused at his display of emotions.

== Evening Primrose ==
An organization promoting equal rights for contractors and their existence to be made public. Contrary to the popular belief, EPR does not intend for Contractors to rise above humanity, but rather seeking a solution for the peaceful coexistence of Contractors and human beings.

Amber (アンバー, Anbā)
Voiced by: Tomoko Kawakami (Japanese); Laura Bailey (English)
The first confirmed Contractor, with her star's Messier code UB-001. She is originally a spy for MI6 with the codename February (フェブラリー, Feburarī) but later defects and joins the Syndicate, adopting "Amber" as her new name. She worked together with Hei and Bai in South America during the "Heaven's War", and founded her own organization, the Evening Primrose at that time. She went missing together with Bai and millions of other people when the Heaven's Gate disappeared, only to reappear later to fight the Syndicate with the rest of the strengthened Evening Primrose. Even after leaving the Syndicate, she chose to keep her codename "Amber," stating that she had grown attached to it. Amber's ability is chronal manipulation, which includes temporal freezing of time and rewinding of events to an unknown degree. Once time has been frozen around her, she can also pull other people out of the frozen time stream, while those still under her ability's effect will no longer detect her presence or movement. Her remuneration is aging backwards. Amagiri has warned her that she cannot use her ability flippantly, saying that she can only pay off her contract to a certain extent. Her overall objective is to destroy the Hell's Gate in a way that doesn't erase every Contractor from existence. Amber has feelings for Hei, in spite of him believing her to be a traitor. She maintains the mysterious Meteor Fragment retrieved from PANDORA's Gate Research Facility in her care in a pouch slung across her shoulder. After showing him all that he would have if he used his power to close off the gate (her, his friends, and his sister), she reveals the true extent of her feelings for him by sacrificing herself so that Hei may pursue, instead, the option of shutting down the particle accelerator that would destroy the gate instead of sacrificing Japan or all Contractors.
Amagiri (雨霧)
Voiced by: Takuya Kirimoto (Japanese); Travis Willingham (English)
A portly, red-haired man whose left eye is frequently shut. His contractor ability enables him to project concussive blasts from his palms. He appears to be Amber's right-hand man, carrying out operations necessary to the Evening Primrose. His remuneration is the consumption of boiled eggs - a fact he does not like due to the cholesterol in them. Surviving the fire in season 1, he gathers the remnants of EPR and retreats into deep jungle. He is later seen rescuing Hei and Yin in Hong Kong after receiving intelligence on the whereabouts of the duo.
Brita (ブリタ, Burita)
Voiced by: Chie Nakamura (Japanese); Jamie Marchi (English)
A blonde-haired woman whose cover was as a secretary in the American embassy in Japan. Her ability is to teleport herself and anyone she is in contact with; however, any clothing is left behind. Brita's remuneration is to kiss other people, which she often combines into one convenient act when teleporting others. She uses her ability to, among other actions, kidnap the researcher Schroeder for the EPR and help Amagiri get to the anti-Gate particle accelerator. Curiously, she seems to have grown accustomed to the inevitable nudity to the point of preference. She is presumed killed in Pandora's attack against "Evening Primrose" "dolls" after being almost burnt to death alongside Amagiri.
Maki (マキ)
Voiced by: Yuko Sanpei (Japanese); Maxey Whitehead (English)
A young boy with heterochromatic irises. Maki's ability allows him to perform a type of spontaneous combustion on objects that he touches with his hands. The explosions can occur remotely as he often prepares handprints before activating his ability. He uses this to cause attacks on the embassies in Tokyo. His remuneration is drinking hot milk. Maki seems to be infatuated with Amber and says he would do anything for her. He attempts to kill Hei out of jealousy, after learning Hei is the "him" that Amber frequently spoke of, convinced that he (Maki) is the only one fit of her love. He is killed by November 11.
Bai (白; pinyin: Bái, lit. White)
Voiced by: Kaori Nazuka, Yuna Fujī (child) (Japanese); Larissa Wolcott (English)
Hei's younger sister. Bai is the Contractor responsible for the disappearance of Heaven's Gate five years prior to the story's setting and had since vanished. The Messier code BK-201 belongs to her star. Bai's abilities are said to be vast, with generating abnormal electricity. In addition to this, she also has the power of molecular reconstruction. Her remuneration is to sleep. At the time of the Heaven's War in South America, Hei was constantly together with Bai during their many operations, acting as a bodyguard of sorts. It was for Bai's sake that Hei joins the Syndicate. When the Heaven's Gate disappeared, Bai's power became Hei's, because—according to Amber—she continues to exist within him by fusion through her molecular reconstruction ability. Hei himself remains oblivious to the fact, until the very end. Her other name is revealed at the end: Xing ("star".)

== PANDORA ==
Physical quantity Alternation Natural Deconstruction Organized Research Agency (PANDORA) is a UN research agency established to investigate Hell's Gate in Tokyo. It is revealed that the Syndicate has sway with the organization and has plans to commit genocide against all Contractors by eliminating Hell's Gate.

Eric Nishijima (エリク・ニシジマ, Eriku Nishijima)
Voiced by: Shinichiro Miki (Japanese); Chuck Huber (English)
A Japanese-American man. He is a high-ranking official within PANDORA. He had influence over Japanese law enforcement over anything related to PANDORA. It is revealed that he is also a high-ranking official within the Syndicate and was placed in charge of destroying Hell's Gate after he had placed a termination for Hei, Mao, Yin and Huang. Hourai later shoots him after Hei destroys the Saturn Ring system. In Shikokku no Hana, his father makes his appearance.
Mina Kandaswamy (ミナ・カンダスワミー, Mina Kandasuwamī)
Voiced by: Sayaka Ohara (Japanese); Carrie Savage (English)
An Indian woman. She is a researcher of PANDORA.

== Central Intelligence Agency (CIA) ==
Following the loss of the dominant superpower position, the CIA strives to restore the United States to her former glory by engaging in various international subvert operations, even as far as going for an all-out invasion on Tokyo at the end of the Season 2.

Nick Hillman (ニック・ヒルマン, Nikku Hiruman)
Voiced by: Shigeru Nakahara (Japanese); Eric Vale (English)
A scientist who Hei meets as he infiltrates PANDORA. Nick and Hei become friends and both have a fascination with the "real sky". Nick turns out to be a contractor and is revealed to have the ability to manipulate electricity, apparently the same as Hei's ability. His remuneration is putting people's shoes on the ground upside-down next to each other. He became close to Hei, thinking that they were both alike, not just in their abilities, but even their dream of wanting to see the real starry sky. He felt that of all the people, he didn't want Hei to know he was a contractor and to get him involved. After he and Hei battle for the artifact known as the "meteor fragment" Nick disappears as soon as the artifact is activated. Apparently, the meteor fragment reacted with Hei and allowed him to make Nick's "dream" come true, which is to have a rocket (which looks very comical) to send both Nick (who became a young boy in his dream) and his sister to space. Nick's ability to have an ambition is a mystery even to himself since contractors shouldn't have emotion.
Corinna Moku (カリーナ・モク, Karīna Moku)
Voiced by: Sayori Ishizuka (Japanese); Kim Matula (English)
A courier who exhibits erratic behavior after infiltrating Pandora. Murdered by Nick.
Mr. Smith (ミスター・スミス, Misutā Smisu)
Voiced by: George Nakata (Japanese); David Trosko (English)
Full name John Smith, a CIA agent who makes frequent contact with Madame Oreille in regards to finding out what happened to Hei after going rogue against the CIA. An avid reader of the Art of War, he is often seen quoting phrases found in the book. He later stages the American occupation of Tokyo and Hell's Gate to regain United States' technological dominance.

== Russian Intelligence ==
Two Russian intelligence agencies appear in the series: Federal Security Service of the Russian Federation (FSB) and Russian Foreign Intelligence Service (SVR). The FSB is the domestic security agency of Russian homeland, acting similarly to the FBI in United States. Meanwhile, the SVR is responsible for intelligence and espionage activities outside of the Russian Federation. It is shown in the series that the SVR has stationed its operatives in various parts of Japan, including Hokkaido and Tokyo.

Bertha (ベルタ, Beruta)
Voiced by: Ai Satō (Japanese); Melinda Allen (English)
Bertha is a large lady and a former opera singer. She is a Contractor that is able to control the resonance of sound. By resonating a frequency that is the inverse of a target's resonance frequency, she can destroy a target. This can also cause other body problems, such as a heart attack, by matching the hearts resonance frequency. Bertha's remuneration is to ingest a foreign substance and then vomit it out; for example, she is shown paying by eating a handful of cigarettes and then vomiting them up. It does not have to be cigarettes but she recounts her past to Itzhak about how she had a baby, who unfortunately choked to death while ingesting one of Bertha's dropped cigarettes. Bertha is killed by Hei in trying to retrieve Yin.
Itzhak (イツァーク, Itsāku)
Voiced by: Yutaka Aoyama (Japanese); Vic Mignogna (English)
Itzhak is a companion of Bertha. He is a Contractor with the ability to capture the "specters" projected by Dolls. He steals many from the astronomy division's mediums. It appears that when he captures them he can also acquire knowledge from the controller of the specters. Itzhak's remuneration is writing poetry, although he is not very good at it, shown by Bertha commenting that it sounds like a teenage girl wrote it, and that he should at least have it rhyme. (He responds that he had never done this before the contract). Itzhak is killed by Huang with a sniper rifle, but before his life ends, he releases all the specters that he had captured.
Goran (ゴラン)
Voiced by: Mitsuaki Madono (Japanese); Michael Chinnici (English)
An agent working in the FSB, Goran is a Russian Contractor who is able to move at super speed to the extent he could dodge bullet hits easily. His remuneration is to eat hamburgers, and he keeps them on hand in a bag whenever he is out on field work. He will even offer the hamburgers to his enemies, that is if they are willing to submit and surrender peacefully. During a raid on a Dr. Pavlichencko's lab, Goran escapes the huge explosion in the lab and later engages April in a battle in the forest nearby. He is killed when April tricks him into running through raindrops at high speed, which punch holes through his body. Later, his corpse, along with his bag of burgers, is seen alongside April's, with an associate telling Repnin, a leading FSB agent, that Goran did not live up to his expectations.
Ilya Sokolov (イリヤ・ソコロフ, Iriya Sokorofu)
Voiced by: Yūji Ueda (Japanese); Christopher Bevins (English)
A contractor with the Russian SVR. His ability is to shut off the brain functions of his victims, causing them to get deprived of oxygen and asphyxiate to death slowly. Ilya is psychotic, sadistic and depraved, and, according to him, he has murdered many women brutally before becoming a Contractor, just to watch them suffer. After he became a contractor, he became more "rational", and started using his ability to deliver a "relaxing" death to his victim. He initially debuts in Hokkaido as he murders an underground doll-trading informant in the toilet of a roadside food outlet. His remuneration is drawing sketches. Although not obliged to do so, Ilya has a tendency to draw rather gruesome images as his payment, particularly of women in death poses with severed limbs and heads. He kidnaps Suoh, Mao and July, intending to hand them over to his superiors, but Hei manages to intercept him. Without his contractor abilities, Hei almost loses to Ilya until he manages to strangle him with his grapple wire. Ironically, Ilya suffers the same sad fate as his past victims -- suffocating to death.
Tanya Akulova (ターニャ・アクロウ, Tanya Akurou)
Voiced by: Yui Ishikawa (Japanese); Alexis Tipton (English)
A close friend of Suoh and Nika, attending the same school as them. She awakens to her latent Contractor abilities at the start of the second season, gaining the ability to summon a seemingly limitless swarm of flesh-devouring cockroaches and joining the FSB soon after. Her apparent remuneration is pulling out strands of her hair. As an FSB agent, she confronts Suoh and Hei, demanding to know Shion's whereabouts. She battles Hei, and uses her cockroaches to devour her former boyfriend Nika, killing him almost instantly, before a surprise shot from awakened Suoh knocks her out. Despite the coldness she shows towards the death of Nika, Tanya is later shown to catch glimpses of the time she and Nika spend together. She is killed after being shot by Shion Pavlichenko from afar using a PTRD-41, the same weapon manifested by Suoh's contractor abilities, which has misled Hei into believing that Suoh has pulled the trigger.

== Underworld ==
Madame Oreille (マダム・オレイユ, Madamu Oreiyu)
Voiced by: Kaho Kōda (Japanese); Jennifer Green (English)
An information broker with a vast information network and knowledge on a number of subjects. She recruits Hei on behalf of the CIA to capture Shion Pavlichenko. She entrusted Hei with the mission to take down a Section 3 cargo before he cut off all ties with her. Her known clients include Agent Smith (CIA) and Misaki Kirihara. She also appears on the rooftop in Ikebukuro informing Suoh of her mother's scheduled arrival at Haneda International Airport. She is seen using a ray gun (a miniature version of the Saturn Ring anti-Gate particles accelerator) on a Section 3 contractor. How she obtain such a weapon remains unknown, as it is developed by Dr. Schroeder exclusively for Section 3 following the destruction of Saturn Ring by Hei in the first season. It appears that she may have had a romantic relationship with Mao in the past, addressing Mao by the name Ricardo.

== Notable Contractors ==
Mai Kashiwagi (柏木 舞, Kashiwagi Mai)
Voiced by: Megumi Nasu (Japanese); Cherami Leigh (English)
A middle school student and the daughter of Kōzō Tahara, the only survivor from Hell's Gate. There is a significant emotional detachment between Mai and her father and Mai chose to adopt her deceased mother's maiden name. As a result of her father's attempts to subdue her Contractor powers, she became a Moratorium but eventually reverts to a Contractor. Her power allows her to create and manipulate fire. Her remuneration takes the form of humming a song. She seems to think of Hei as an older brother. She reappears as a contractor of the syndicate, protecting the Saturn anti-Gate particle accelerator, and burns Amagiri using her powers. She is thought to be crushed to death by falling debris from the Saturn system.
Havoc (ハヴォック, Havokku)
Voiced by: Naomi Shindō (Japanese); Luci Christian (English)
A Regressor who lost her powers and a significant portion of her memories after Heaven's Gate disappeared in South America, five years prior to the story's setting. She was found in a Romanian village after the incident and had lost both her power and memories, and was isolated from the Syndicate. She lived together with a family in the village, which had greatly influenced her to change emotionally, she discovered simple things such as eating and cooking to be fun. She wanted to cook more for the children, wanting to see more of their smiles. The reason why she was discovered again was not clear, but she was discovered by the MI-6 and brought to PANDORA. She used to be one of the most notorious and feared Contractors, rumored to have killed hundreds to thousands of people during the South American War. Her former powers are unknown, but are said to be similar to creating a vacuum. Her remuneration was to drink the blood of children. Havoc, whose real name is Carmine, and Hei have some history together; this becomes apparent when Hei interrogates Havoc about the whereabouts of his missing sister Bai, and that she also noticed that he still had the same big appetite but he had changed for the better since he was more emotional, causing her to laugh aloud. Hei notes that it was the first time he had seen her do so, to which she also notes that she's not good at it, and so was Hei. When Havoc decided to help Hei in finding his sister by regaining her memories, she had hoped that she would be able to handle her abilities because of her change, but unable to do so, she wanted Hei to kill her because she doesn't want to kill any more. However, Hei refuses to do so wanting to save her by getting her out of the gate, but in her confusion she later dies at the hands of November 11, unable to deliver her last message to Hei after her memories and powers returned from being near the gate.
Wei Zhijun (魏志軍(ウェイ・チージュン), Wei Chījun; pinyin: Wèi Zhìjūn)
Voiced by: Takeshi Kusao (Japanese); Robert McCollum (English)
A Contractor by code VI-952. Wei has an elvish appearance with narrow eyes, pointy ears and shoulder-length black hair. He attempted to overthrow and take over the Chinese gang Qing Long Tang (青龍堂(チンロンタン), Chin Ron Tan; pinyin: Qīng Lóng Táng) by murdering many of its executives. Prior to this he acted as the bodyguard of the Qing Long Tang's leader's daughter, Alice Wang. His contract allows him to disintegrate anything his blood spills onto by snapping his fingers. Conveniently, his remuneration is shedding blood, allowing him to cut his heavily scarred arm so that he can spill or fling blood onto targets to use his power. He is thought to have died after being electrocuted and beaten by Hei in a battle, however, it is later revealed by Huang that his body mysteriously disappeared from the morgue. He later reappears as a member of the Evening Primrose, revealing a shorter haircut and a burn-like scar covering much of the left side of his face due to being electrocuted by Hei. He joined the Evening Primrose to get an opportunity for a rematch with Hei, who Wei states is the only person to have beaten him. Mao observes that Wei's desire to fight Hei due to feeling humiliated is very unusual for a Contractor, as there is a possibility he will die. After being mortally wounded by Hei in a fight, he admits defeat and uses his ability to destroy both himself and the wall behind him, giving Hei access to Hell's Gate.
Alma (アルマ, Aruma)
Voiced by: Urara Takano (Japanese); Jennifer Seman (English)
A Contractor who started her own religion intended for those like herself. Pursued by the Syndicate for killing one of their operatives, her congregation is in danger of being brought down. It is she who first brings to light what contractors really are and how they differ from normal humans, this truth being the reason why she started her religion. Her contract is the ability to transform her physical appearance to match a target exactly at the cost of her longevity. Thus, because of her skills, she had been utilized as an infiltrator and assassin. Though young in appearance to her followers, her true form is that of an elderly woman due to extensive use of her contract. She later exhibits emotions unlike a contractor where she truly wished to create a haven for her fellow contractors. She relayed her past and ambitions to Hei as her last message, accepting her fate, which in of itself was not befitting of a contractor to do so, since she could've prolonged her life by escaping.
Shihoko Kishida (岸田 志保子, Kishida Shihoko)
Voiced by: Rumiko Ukai (Japanese); Lydia Mackay (English)
An operative of The Syndicate even longer than Huang, Shihoko is a contractor tasked with the job of infiltrating Alma's organization to gather intel for an eventual assassination. Years ago, she was tasked with assassinating Isozaki, Huang's partner when the two were detectives, after learning that he was linked to covering up the murder of one of the syndicate's operatives. She had gotten very close to Huang in order to figure out which of the two was working for Alma's organization, leaving Huang with an emotional scar for many years. Her contract allows her to destroy the internal organs of an individual at the cost of regaining her human sensitivity for a short time. The remuneration can put her in a state of psychological shock due to the abrupt swing of emotion. Although she experiences human emotions during her remuneration, she realizes that her feelings for Huang were genuine because even though her contractor emotions came back, the memories she had together with him still made her feel warm. She later commits suicide by jumping in front of a truck, saving Huang from being targeted by the Syndicate.
Shichi aka Claude (Shichi aka Claude)
Voiced by: Tetsuya Iwanaga (Japanese); Johnny Yong Bosch (English)
A contractor who works for the Syndicate who was sent to capture Yin, he appears in Darker Than Black Gaiden. Claude's core ability is the control of people; he can also control people's senses, putting them under illusions. He was even able to trick Hei into thinking he was Amber. His remuneration is that he must eat the petal of a flower. Claude possessed a high degree of irrationality, unlike most other contractors. He does not seem to care about his own safety, but is only intent on causing chaos whenever he can. This may stem from his nihilistic attitude towards the world which he has displayed on several occasions. His main goal is to awaken Izanami, for he believes that she will create a world where Contractors would rule over humans. He manages to capture Yin, and at first his intentions seem to be selling Yin to the highest bidder. However, he calls all the major intelligence agencies at once, causing them to arrive all at the same time and engage in a massive four-way fight. The Chinese are the first to get through to him, and Claude seemingly strikes a deal with them. However, he later calmly throws the money he gains out of the window, and tricks Hei into awakening Izanami. The Chinese agents tackle him for his betrayal, and Claude willingly allows himself to be shot three times in the stomach. He lives long enough to be killed by Izanami.

== Minor characters ==
Misuzu Ōyama (大山 美鈴, Ōyama Misuzu)
Voiced by: Chika Sakamoto (Japanese); Julie Mayfield (English)
Hei's landlady. She is usually seen chasing Mao away from the house. She also likes to compliment Hei for being such a good boy.
Toshiro Ōyama (大山 敏郎, Ōyama Toshirō)
Voiced by: Yasuo Iwata (Japanese); Grant James (English)
Misuzu's husband. He speaks very rarely and mostly tends his plants.
Babo (バボ)
Hei's Neighbor, who has only one line, which is at the end of the OVA episode, despite appearing more frequently than other tenants. He catches Mayu Ōtsuka spying on Hei and became convinced she was stalking himself. He brought flowers for her at the end of the OVA, but stated in his one line that, "She isn't coming, is she?"
Irene (アイリーン, Airīn)
Voiced by: Mitsuki Saiga (Japanese); Trina Nishimura (English)
A dark skinned Filipino woman with orange hair who lives beneath Hei. She moved to Japan to make money for her family back in her homeland by working as a bartender.
Louis (ルイス, Ruisu)
Voiced by: Keiichi Nakagawa (Japanese); Johnathan Brooks (English)
Hei's Neighbor. Almost never seen without his guitar.
Joshua (ヨシュア, Yoshua)
Voiced by: Kōhei Fukuhara (Japanese); Bruce Lewis (English)
Hei's Neighbor. He came to Japan from Israel. He has an interest in Japanese animation, claiming it is #1 in the world.
Gai Kurasawa (久良沢 凱, Kurasawa Gai)
Voiced by: Yasunori Matsumoto (Japanese); Brandon Potter (English)
Gai Kurasawa is Japan's "number one" detective. Formerly known as Gai Matsukichi, he was a police officer who quit the force to start his own detective agency. He uses unorthodox methods to solve mysteries and crimes, is afraid of cats, has horrible body odor and athlete's foot, and is struggling financially.
Kiko Kayanuma (茅沼 キコ, Kayanuma Kiko)
Voiced by: Emiri Katō (Japanese); Brittney Karbowski (English)
Gai Kurasawa's assistant, she is obsessed with manga and anime. She's often seen partaking in cosplay and reading fanfiction. Her character is perceived as a flamboyant parody of the stereotypical "fangirl". She also has a crush on Hei, and consistently plots methods of stalking him. In the season 1 OVA, she swoons over his perfect collarbones. Kiko also makes multiple attempts at befriending Yin, and has included her in her cosplay, despite the fact that she's a doll. But despite her somewhat childish nature, Kiko also can be very level-headed, making attempts at keeping Gai grounded while he's on a case, and is constantly concerned about his business's financial status. She sometimes can come off as money-grubbing, and willing to do anything for a quick buck. She's referred to by Mao as "that pink girl".

== Reception ==
The series cast has often been compared with X-Men comics for its handling of supernatural fighters. Anime News Network felt that while the setting was difficult to understand, the narrative and cast were appealing. This was mostly due to the dual personality from Hei who remains as a mystery in the early episodes he comes across with two dual personalities: the assassin Hei and the transfer student Li. The fight scenes were also the subject of praise of the handling of Contractors battles which contrast the lighthearted tones of parts of the narrative more lighthearted. Maxibe Gee from the University of York compared the cast of the anime with the handling noir series or films such as Do Androids Dream of Electric Sheep? and Ghost in the Shell. Although Hei was noted to be similar to noir protagonists, his actions in the first series was noted to be different other heroes from the same genre. The handling of Dolls, most notably Yin, was noted to be a departure from popular series as she becomes one of the most important allies to Hei rather than a femme fatale as a result of interacting with Hei across the series, developing a notable humanity in the process.

Though Hei mentors the new lead Suou, Martin found Suou as a more interesting protagonist to the point that he felt Hei was not needed to make sequel appealing. Similar to Martin, another writer from The Fandom Post found Hei as a less appealing character than Suou which made him wonder his fans of the original series were bothered by Hei's relatively less appearances in the sequels. The misrelationship Hei and Suou was noted to be also quite upsetting as a result of have the former's attacks to the latter's family. As a result, he found the OVAs important to explore the character's downfall during his journey with Yin. Nevertheless, the reviewer felt that Hei's concept of an action hero did not change.

The audio of the series earned praise in regards to both Japanese and English actors though Fandom Post recommended the audience to select the later ones when watching the series based on their deliveries. Tomoko Kawakami's performance as Amber was pointed out as "solid" especially since it was the actress' final work before her death, while Jason Liebrecht's Hei was commented to be "a schizophrenic variation" of Syaoran from Tsubasa: Reservoir Chronicle among other appealing English actors. Anime News Network claimed that both Japanese and English voice actors managed to make lipsynch be properly matched regardless of language.

The illustrations and characterizations in Fujiwara's Shikkoku no Hana manga series earned praise by Manga News and Manga Sanctuary for how complex are the cast, most notably Hei and Yin. However, Harverst, was felt lacking in comparison.
