= Chikyu Misaki =

Japanese manga series by Yūji Iwahara

- Misaki & Neo

地球美紗樹 (Chikyū Misaki)
- Manga
- Written by: Yūji Iwahara
- Published by: Kadokawa Shoten
- English publisher: NA: CMX Manga
- Magazine: Shōnen Ace Next
- Original run: 2000 – 2002
- Volumes: 3

Chikyu Misaki (Japanese: 地球美紗樹, Hepburn: Chikyū Misaki; "Earth Misaki") is a Japanese manga series by Yūji Iwahara. The series was released in the United States by CMX Manga and follows a young girl as she returns to her grandfather's house after his death, only to get drawn into a series of misadventures with a mysterious shape changing boy.

== Synopsis ==
The series follows Misaki, a 14-year-old schoolgirl that comes to the town of Hohopo to inherit her grandfather's house and land. Once there she soon discovers that the lake contains a "hohopo", a creature similar to the Loch Ness Monster in appearance that has the capability to transform into a young boy. Naming him Neo, Misaki soon has to keep him safe from people that would harm him or exploit him in order to gain fortune and fame. During her misadventures Misaki gets kidnapped by a woman intent on retrieving gold that sunk to the bottom of the lake after a botched kidnapping, but is eventually set free. Hiding Neo becomes more of a challenge after he becomes incapable of transforming back to his human state. As a result, a hitman that came to the town looking for the ransom money starts hunting for Neo in order to sell him as a strange find. During all of this Misaki begins to remember things about her past and realizes that she has a strong bond to Neo due to a set of experiments that her grandfather performed on both her and Neo.

== Characters ==
=== Children ===
- Makishima Misaki: A 14-year-old girl from Tokyo.
- Neo: A sea creature that is capable of transforming into a human child after kissing various humans.
- Okouchi Sanae: Misaki's friend, Sanae lives in Hohoro.
- Asai Tokuko: A shy and quiet girl that is kidnapped due to her family's extreme wealth.
- Okouchi Taiyo & Ken

=== Adults ===
- Makishima Kyoichi: The awkward widowed father of Misaki, and would be love interest of Nishioka Aoi.
- Nishioka Aoi: She was a childhood friend/rival of Misaki's mother, Kaoru.
- Fujikawa Reiko: Tokuko's piano tutor and kidnapper.
- Fuyukiko Bando

== Reception ==
Anime News Network's Jason Thompson praised the series' artwork and storyline. Mania.com also gave a positive review, calling the manga a "hidden gem".
