= Dimension W =

Japanese manga and anime television series

- Cover of the first tankōbon volume featuring Mira Yurizaki
- Genre: Action; Cyberpunk
- Manga
- Written by: Yūji Iwahara
- Published by: Square Enix
- English publisher: NA: Yen Press
- Magazine: Young Gangan (16 September 2011 – 20 November 2015); Monthly Big Gangan (25 December 2015 – 25 June 2019)
- Original run: 16 September 2011 – 25 June 2019
- Volumes: 16
- Anime television series
- Directed by: Kanta Kamei
- Produced by: Justin Cook; Norihiko Fujisawa; Hitoyasu Oyama; Ryūji Abe
- Written by: Shōtarō Suga; Ryō Higaki
- Music by: Go Shiina; Yoshiaki Fujisawa
- Studio: Studio 3Hz; Orange
- Licensed by: AUS: Crunchyroll Store; NA: Crunchyroll (Note: Through Crunchyroll, LLC (formerly as Funimation))
- Original network: Tokyo MX, KBS, SUN, TVA, BS11, AT-X
- English network: US: Adult Swim (Toonami)
- Original run: 10 January 2016 – 27 March 2016
- Episodes: 12 + 6 OVAs

Dimension W is a Japanese manga series written and illustrated by Yūji Iwahara. It was published in Square Enix's seinen manga magazine Young Gangan from September 2011 to November 2015 and later in Monthly Big Gangan from December 2015 to June 2019. It is licensed in North America by Yen Press. The series follows an auto mechanic hobbyist named Kyouma Mabuchi and a robot girl named Mira Yurizaki, both of whom are "Collectors", bounty hunters tasked with confiscating illegal Coils, dangerous devices which can harness the power of another dimension. As they reluctantly pair up for their mission, they begin to discover the truth behind New Tesla Energy, the multinational supplier of worldwide electrical power. An anime television series aired between January and March 2016.

== Synopsis ==
In the year 2036, a fourth-dimensional axis called Dimension W is proven to exist. Cross-dimensional electromagnetic induction devices, known as Coils, were developed to draw out the inexhaustible supply of energy that exists in Dimension W. New Tesla Energy and governments built sixty giant towers around the world in the pattern of a truncated icosahedron to stabilize the energy from Dimension W and supply power to the entire world.

This "world system" is nearing its tenth year of operation as the story begins in 2072, and Coils of various sizes provide remote electrical power to everything from cellphones to vehicles and robots. However, dangerous unregistered Coils that do not send information back to New Tesla Energy are being used for illicit purposes. Bounty hunters known as "Collectors" are tasked with confiscating the illegal Coils. Among the Collectors is Kyouma Mabuchi, a Coil-hating loner who one day stumbles upon Mira Yurizaki, the gynoid "daughter" of New Tesla Energy's ailing intellectual founder. When her father disappears while activating an experimental double-ringed Coil, Mira decides to join a reluctant Kyouma and follow the illegal Coils, in the process discovering shady business involving New Tesla Energy.

== Characters ==
=== Protagonists ===
Kyouma Mabuchi (マブチ・キョーマ, Mabuchi・Kyōma)
Voiced by: Daisuke Ono (Japanese); Christopher R. Sabat (English)
Kyouma is a Collector who has completely sworn off all Coil-related technology and has a hobby of restoring old gasoline-powered cars in a junkyard. In the past, Kyouma joined the special-ops unit, Grendel, and took part in a war over competing ideologies within New Tesla Energy to get an experimental prosthetic body for his terminally-ill fiancée, Miyabi. The war was won with the destruction of Easter Island, though Kyouma lost his memories of the battle and Miyabi in surgery due to a Coil malfunction at the same time. To earn a living and help prevent dangerous Coil malfunctions, Kyouma became an independent contractor who hunts down illegal Coils and those who use them. His preferred weapons are throwing needles using which he can travel with. In the series, he is most often shown driving a white Toyota 2000GT.
Mira Yurizaki (百合崎 ミラ, Yurizaki Mira)
Voiced by: Reina Ueda (Japanese); Jad Saxton (English)
Mira is a highly advanced robot who exhibits human mannerisms and emotions while insisting that she is a normal girl despite her robotic headgear, metallic tail, and other inhuman physical attributes. She is very kind and sweet and is willing to go great lengths to protect those around her even if it means putting herself in harm's way. Kyouma rarely calls her by her name and usually calls her as "Bolts" in the manga. It is later revealed that her body was originally designed as a prosthetic for Miyabi Azumaya and bears her physical proportions. After hearing news of her "father's" death, Mira decides to help Kyouma collect illegal Coils. When Koorogi repairs Mira after a stack of cars falls on her, he adds skin-folds to conceal her Coil. Mira possesses superhuman strength and speed, can override computer systems, use her tail to directly interface with Coils, and detect dimensional distortions.

=== Illegal Coil Collectors ===
Mary (マリー, Marī)
Voiced by: Kimiko Saitō (Japanese); Stephanie Young (English)
Mary is a shady club owner who contracts Kyouma to collect illegal Coils for the New Tesla Energy bounty.
Koorogi (コオロギ, Kōrogi)
Voiced by: Yoshitsugu Matsuoka (Japanese); Jessie James Grelle (English)
Koorogi is a computer expert and engineer employed by Mary. He does not get along with Kyouma, but provides him with information when requested. His name translates to Cricket in English.

=== New Tesla Energy ===
New Tesla Energy is the largest enterprise in the world. Among its known staff members are:

Albert Schuman (アルベルト・シューマン, Aruberuto・Shūman)
Voiced by: Akira Ishida (Japanese); Eric Vale (English)
Albert is an old friend of Kyouma who works for New Tesla Energy's Dimensional Administration Bureau (D.A.B.), a paramilitary research group that conducts special tasks such as monitoring potential Coil malfunctions and isolating and covering-up dimensional collapses that occur. Albert and Kyouma met while serving with elite military unit Grendel, of which they are the only two survivors.
Shido Yurizaki (百合崎 士堂, Yurizaki Shidō)
Voiced by: Takaya Hashi (Japanese); Jeremy Schwartz (English)
Shido is the "physicist of the century" and founder of New Tesla Energy in America. He foresaw the militarization of Coils and proposed the superhuman unit Grendel. Shido disappeared two years ago following the death of his wife and daughter. He uses his robot "daughter", Mira, to seek out illegal Coils to fuel himself and his research. When the company finally tracks him down in the present, Shido uses the last of his strength to unleash his latest experiment that burns out all Coils for several city blocks before vanishing, leaving his fate unknown.
Seira Yurizaki (百合崎 セイラ, Yurizaki Seira)
Voiced by: Takako Honda (Japanese); Jamie Marchi (English)
Seira is the wife of Shido Yurizaki and a leading prosthetics and robotic developer. She accepted terminally-ill Miyabi Azumaya as a test subject to have her consciousness transferred into a prosthetic body. However, an unexplained Coil malfunction during the radical surgery cost Miyabi's life and left Seira badly injured. Seira later created Mira from the body intended for Miyabi. Seira and her daughter Ichigo were killed when the D.A.B. broke into their home to seize the results of her research on the day Mira was activated.
Claire Skyheart (クレア・スカイハート, Kurea・Sukaihāto)
Voiced by: Rica Fukami (Japanese); Monica Rial (English)
Claire is the chief operations officer (C.O.O.) of New Tesla Energy Central 47 and Albert's superior. Her granddaughter, Shiora, is one of the four children who play around Kyouma's place.

=== Easter Island ===
A dangerous and forbidden ruin of dimensional collapse, the remote island was once home to New Tesla Energy's Adrastea research facility, which employed:

Julian Tyler-Smith (ジュリアン・タイラー=スミス, Jurian・Tairā-Sumisu) / Loser (ルーザー, Rūzā)
Voiced by: Yuichi Nakamura (Japanese); J. Michael Tatum (English)
Loser is a masked art thief who is popular with the public for broadcasting his heists that apparently always fail, hence his nickname. In reality, he is after the 'Numbers' Coils alongside his daughter Ellie, seeking revenge on Haruka Seameyer due to causing an accident in which he lost his face, hands, feet and the life of his wife. He had once been a top researcher for New Tesla Energy, where he invented energy shields. He uses Numbers Coils in some of his body parts like his hands and feet which allow him to fly, create W energy shields, have super strength and launch energy blasts.
Haruka Seameyer (ハルカ・シーマイヤー, Haruka・Shīmaiyā)
Voiced by: Yūki Kaji (Japanese); Chris Patton (English)
Haruka is a former New Tesla Energy scientist and protégé of Shido Yurizaki who went mad after New Tesla Energy executives suppressed his promising research while he was on the verge of a breakthrough to create the Genesis Coil. He convinces many other scientists to join his cause and conducts illegal Coil research while committing terrorist acts against his ex-corporate masters. During an incident on Easter Island he killed many scientists working on project Adrastea by trying to teleport them when trying to perfect Genesis. As a result of Grendel's intervention he lost his arm and became trapped in another world.

=== Islero ===
Salva-Enna-Tibesti (サルバ=エネ=ティベスティ, Saruba-Ene-Tibesuti)
Voiced by: Kōsuke Toriumi, Mikako Komatsu (child) (Japanese); Ian Sinclair, Justin Briner (child) (English)
Salva is the Berber chief executive officer (C.E.O.) of robot manufacturer Islero and C.O.O. of New Tesla Energy Central 60. Known as "The Wind of Africa," he is a considerable celebrity. His childhood dream was to create the world that his adoptive brother Lwai would one day rule. After mistakenly crippling Lwai, Salva has been searching a way to heal his brother.
Lwai-Aura-Tibesti (ルワイ=オーラ=ティベスティ, Ruwai-Ōra-Tibesuti)
Voiced by: Daiki Yamashita (Japanese); Clifford Chapin (English)
Lwai is the young heir to the throne of Isla. During a revolt, he unwittingly stepped into the crossfire and was gravely injured by one of Salva's war machines. His broken body is kept on life support while Salva's invention permits Lwai to remotely inhabit robotic bodies.
Lashiti (ラシティ, Rashiti)
Voiced by: Mamiko Noto (Japanese); Mallorie Rodak (English)
Lashiti is a faithful retainer of the Tibesti royal family. She once took an assassin's bullet meant for Prince Salva.

=== Other characters ===
Elizabeth "Ellie" Greenhough-Smith (エリザベス・グリーンハウ=スミス, Erizabesu・Gurīnhau-Sumisu)
Voiced by: Eri Suzuki (Japanese); Maxey Whitehead (English)
Ellie is another Collector who is secretly Loser's assistant and daughter. She is good at using drones in the form of animals like pigeons and bats. Additionally she uses Coil powered wings for extra mobility.
Miyabi Azumaya (四阿屋 雅, Azumaya Miyabi)
Voiced by: Kaede Okutani (Japanese); Trina Nishimura (English)
Miyabi is Kyouma's deceased fiancée. She was dedicated to her photography hobby, and was diagnosed with a terminal illness that caused her muscles to eat themselves, a muscular dystrophy. During the operation that was meant to save her life, there was an accident with the Coil that was supposed to support her android body and her head was lost in the explosion. This led to Kyouma's hatred for Coils.
Tsubaki Azumaya (四阿屋 椿, Azumaya Tsubaki)
Voiced by: Sayaka Ohara (Japanese); Anastasia Muñoz (English)
Tsubaki is Miyabi's older sister, who manages a kimono shop with assistants Hirose and Ayukawa. She is protective of Kyouma and makes happi coats for him with concealed pockets for his throwing needles.
Ichigo Yurizaki (百合崎 苺, Yurizaki Ichigo)
Voiced by: Shiina Natsukawa (Japanese); Kristi Kang (English)
Ichigo is the daughter of Shido Yurizaki and Seira Yurizaki.
Shiora Skyheart (シオラ・スカイハート, Shiora・Sukaihāto)
Voiced by: Yurika Kubo (Japanese); Bryn Apprill (English)
Shiora is the granddaughter of Claire Skyheart.

== Media ==
=== Manga ===
Yūji Iwahara began serializing Dimension W in Square Enix's seinen magazine Young Gangan on 16 September 2011. The manga ceased running in Young Gangan on 20 November 2015, moving to Square Enix's Monthly Big Gangan on 25 December 2015. Yen Press announced their license to the series in October 2015, with plans to publish the first volume in spring or summer 2016. The series has been collected into sixteen tankōbon volumes.

No.	Original release date	Original ISBN	English release date	English ISBN
1	25 April 2012	978-4-7575-3575-6	23 February 2016	978-0-31-627219-3
01. "The Fourth Dimension" (第4の次元軸, Dai Yon no Jigen-jiku); 02. "Pursuit" (追跡, Tsuiseki); 03. "The Light of the Beginning" (始まりの灯, Hajimari no Akari); 04. "Sky Area" (スカイエリア, Sukai Eria); 05. "Loser" (ルーザー, Rūzā); 06. "The Angels of Black and White Wings Statue" (白と黒の天使像, Shiro to Kuro no Tenshi-zō); 07. "Fireworks in the Air" (打ち上げられた花火, Uchiage Rareta Hanabi)
2	25 July 2012	978-4-7575-3676-0	24 May 2016	978-0-31-627221-6
08. "Grendel" (グレンデル, Gurenderu); 09. "Dimensional Collapse" (次元崩壊, Jigen Hōkai); 10. "Home" (ホーム, Hōmu); 11. "Score" (スコア, Sukoa); 12. "Sorrow" (哀しみ, Kanashimi); 13. "Rain Man" (雨の男, Ame no Otoko); 14. "Chase" (チエイス, Chieisu); 15. "After the Rain" (アメアガリ, Ame Agari)
3	25 January 2013	978-4-7575-3866-5	30 August 2016	978-0-31-627613-9
16. "The Otherworldly" (異界, Ikai); 17. "The Guests" (ゲスト, Gesuto); 18. "Old Friends" (古くからの友人, Furuku kara no Yūjin); 19. "UFO"; 20. "Memory Method" (記憶方法, Kioku Hōhō); 21. "History" (歴史, Rekishi); 22. "Flood of Memories" (思い出の洪水, Omoide no Kōzui); 23. "Two Worlds" (2つの世界, Tsu no Sekai)
4	25 July 2013	978-4-7575-3991-4	22 November 2016	978-0-31-639775-9
24. "The Black Book" (ブラックブック, Burakku Bukku); 25. "Origin of the Universe" (宇宙の起源, Uchū no Kigen); 26. "Nightmare in the Fog" (霧の中の悪夢, Kiri no Naka no Akumu); 27. "Similar Yet Worlds Apart" (似ているが世界は離れている, Nite Iruga Sekai wa Hanarete Iru); 28. "Down the Hole" (穴を下って, Ana o Kudatte); 29. "The Truth of 21 Years Ago" (21年前の真実, 21-nen Mae no Shinjitsu); 30. "Tears of Blood" (血の涙, Chi no Namida); 31. "Flower of Asbestos" (アスベストの花, Asubesuto no Hana)
5	25 January 2014	978-4-7575-4211-2	21 February 2017	978-0-31-639777-3
32. "Mira's Observation Diary" (ミラの観察日記, Mira no Kansatsu Nikki); 33. "Wind from Africa" (アフリカからの風, Afurika kara no Kaze); 34. "Kyoma's Melancholy" (京馬の憂鬱, Kyō ma no Yūtsu); 35. "Fireworks Above the River" (川の上の花火, Kawa no Ue no Hanabi); 36. "Fateful Place" (運命の場所, Unmei no Basho); 37. "United" (ユナイテッド, Yunaiteddo); 38. "A Past Life" (過去の人生, Kako no Jinsei); 39. "To Disappear into Darkness" (闇に消える, Yami ni Kieru)
6	25 July 2014	978-4-7575-4365-2	23 May 2017	978-0-31-639779-7
40. "Assassins" (暗殺者, Asashin); 41. "Nothingness" (無, Mu); 42. "The Mystery Sphere" (ミステリースフィア, Misuterī Sufia); 43. "The Sixtieth Tower" (60番目の塔, 60-banme no Tō); 44. "Lost Time" (失われた時間, Ushinawareta Jikan); 45. "Old Enemies" (古い敵, Furui Teki); 46. "Two Battles" (2つの戦い, Tsu no Tatakai); 47. "A Death Long Overdue" (長い間延滞した死, Nagaiai Entai Shita Shi)
7	25 November 2014	978-4-7575-4479-6	29 August 2017	978-0-31-639781-0
48. "Ground Zero" (グラウンドゼロ, Guraundo Zero); 49. "At the End of the Tunnel" (トンネルの終わりに, Ton'neru no Owari ni); 50. "Mabuchi & Loser" (マブチ&敗者, Mabuchi & Haisha); 51. "Memories of the Past" (過去の思い出, Kako no Omoide); 52. "Two Bodies" (2つのボディ, Tsu no Bodi); 53. "Homecoming" (ホームカミング, Hōmukamingu); 54. "Operation Countdown" (操作カウントダウン, Sōsa Kauntodaun); 55. "Light" (光, Hikari)
8	10 July 2015	978-4-7575-4700-1	14 November 2017	978-0-31-639784-1
56. "Mira's Fight" (ミラの戦い, Mira no Tatakai); 57. "The Truth of Adrastea" (アドラステアの真実, Adorasutea no Shinjitsu); 58. "Order of Cowards" (臆病者の命令, Okubyōmono no Meirei); 59. "Hero Showdown" (ヒーロー対決, Hīrō Taiketsu); 60. "Cross-Bridge" (クロスブリッジ, Kurosu-Burijji); 61. "Hammer" (ハンマー, Hanmā); 62. "Afterimage" (残像, Zanzō)
9	25 December 2015	978-4-7575-4842-8	20 February 2018	978-0-31-641181-3
63. "As the Past Bares Its Fangs" (過去がその牙をむき出しにするように, Kako ga sono Kiba o Mukidashi ni Suru Yō ni); 64. "Rendezvous Point" (ランデブーポイント, Randebū Pointo); 65. "Lost Memory" (失われた記憶, Ushinawareta Kioku); 66. "Loser's Memories" (敗者の記憶, Haisha no Kioku); 67. "Convergence of Possibilities" (可能性の収束, Kanōsei no Shūsoku); 68. "Genesis's Whereabouts" (ジェネシスの所在, Jeneshisu no Shozai); 69. "The Monster of Adrastea" (アドラステアの怪物, Adorasutea no Kaibutsu)
9.5	25 December 2015	978-4-7575-4843-5	—	—
10	25 March 2016	978-4-7575-4922-7	22 May 2018	978-1-97-530032-6
70. "Despair" (絶望, Zetsubō); 71. "Kyouma & Mira" (キョウマとミラ, Kyouma to Mira); 72. "The Last Piece" (最後のピース, Saigo no Pīsu); 73. "Miyabi" (みやび, Miyabi); 74. "Clear Skies" (晴天, Seiten); 75. "Epilogue" (エピローグ, Epirōgu); 76. "Auto Show" (自動車ショー, Jidōsha Shō)
11	24 September 2016	978-4-7575-5106-0	21 August 2018	978-1-97-530035-7
77. "Signs of Change" (変化の兆候, Henka no Chōkō); 78. "Ellie All Alone" (エリーオールアローン, Erī Ōru Arōn); 79. "Trap" (トラップ, Torappu); 80. "The Men Whose Names Hush Even Crying Children" (名前が泣いている子供でさえも静まる男性, Namae ga Naite Iru Kodomode Sae mo Shizumaru Dansei); 81. "Mira's Whereabouts" (ミラの行方, Mira no Yukue); 82. "Sword of Eudos" (Eudosの剣, Eudos no Ken); 83. "The Strong" (強い, Tsuyoi)
12	25 April 2017	978-4-7575-5335-4	13 November 2018	978-1-97-530038-8
84. "Contact" (連絡先, Renrakusen); 85. "The Moving World" (動く世界, Ugoku Sekai); 86. "Secret of the Dual-Ring Coil" (デュアルリングコイルの秘密, De Yuaru-Ringu Koiru no Himitsu); 87. "Coming Apart" (バラバラになる, Barabara Ninaru); 88. "The 1/3rd Truth" (1/3の真実, 1/3 no Shinjitsu); 89. "Grand Tour" (グランドツアー, Gurando Tsuā); 90. "Dark Night" (暗い夜, Kurai Yoru)
13	25 October 2017	978-4-7575-5507-5	19 February 2019	978-1-97-538271-1
91. "Mystery Water" (ミステリーウォーター, Misuterī Uōtā); 92. "High Wall" (高い壁, Takai Kabe); 93. "Selection Spark (セレクションスパーク", Serekushon Supāku); 94. "Closed Community" (クローズドコミュニティ, Kurōzudo Komyuniti); 95. "Angry Mira" (怒っているミラ, Ikatteiru Mira); 96. "Fallout" (フォールアウト, Fōruauto); 97. "Hurricane" (ハリケーン, Harikēn)
14	25 April 2018	978-4-7575-5701-7	21 May 2019	978-1-97-538274-2
98. "Beast Hunt" (獣狩り, Shishigari); 99. "Turning Point" (ターニングポイント, Tāningu Pointo); 100. "The Quaking World" (震える世界, Furueru Sekai); 101. "The Depths of Hell" (地獄の深さ, Jigoku no Fukasa); 102. "Underground World" (アンダーグラウンドワールド, Andāguraundo Wārudo); 103. "Uno & Nove"; 104. "Reunion" (再会, Saikai)
15	24 November 2018	978-4-7575-5924-0	27 August 2019	978-1-97-538495-1
105. "Changing World" (変わりゆく世界, Kawari Yuku Sekai); 106. "Black Ship" (黒船, Kurofune); 107. "Poison Stinger" (ポイズンスティンガー, Poizun Sutingā); 108. "Path to the Surface" (表面へのパス, Hyōmen e no Pasu); 109. "Missing Memories" (失われた記憶, Ushinawareta Kioku); 110. "Hunter Nest" (ハンターネスト, Hantā Nesuto); 111. "Positioned Pieces" (配置された駒, Haichi-sa Reta Koma)
16	24 August 2019	978-4-75-756259-2	31 March 2020	978-1-97-539941-2
112. "Alexei Landlight" (アレクセイ・ランドライト, Arekusei・Randoraito); 113. "Site of the Final Battle" (最終決戦の地, Saishū Kessen no Ji); 114. "Mira in the Ark" (箱舟の中のミラ, Hakobune no Naka no Mira); 115. "Mira's Barrier" (ミラのバリア, Mira no Baria); 116. "Finale" (大詰, Ōdzume)

=== Anime ===
Studio 3Hz and Orange produced an anime television series adaptation based on Dimension W. The series is directed by Kanta Kamei with Shōtarō Suga acting as the series organizer and Tokuyuki Matsutake serving as the character designer. Funimation served as part of the anime's production committee. The opening theme song is "Genesis" performed by Stereo Dive Foundation, while the ending theme song is "Contrast" performed by Fo'xTails. Due to licensing complications regarding editing shorter for time, Toonami's broadcast version outright removed the opening and ending theme songs used from episodes 2 to 11.

The series premiered on 10 January 2016, and aired on Tokyo MX, Kyoto Broadcasting System, BS11, AT-X, Sun Television, and TV Aichi, and was simulcast worldwide with dubs produced by Funimation. Madman Entertainment procured the rights to stream the anime on AnimeLab. On 12 February 2016, it was announced that the anime would be broadcast on Adult Swim's Toonami programming block, replacing Akame ga Kill!, beginning on 28 February 2016. The series was later released on Blu-ray on 25 March 2016.

The series was licensed in the UK by Anime Limited, however it was later delisted and cancelled.

==== Episodes ====
No.	Title	Directed by	Written by	Storyboarded by	Original release date	English air date	Ref.
1	"Collector"; Transliteration: "Kaishū-ya" (Japanese: 回収屋)	Yuki Ogawa	Shōtarō Suga	Kanta Kamei	10 January 2016	28 February 2016	
Auto mechanic hobbyist and Collector Kyouma Mabuchi is called in by Mary to confiscate illegal Coils acquired by a local gang led by the Won Brothers. While this is happening, a mysterious girl meets her "father" who is later revealed to be Shidou Yurizaki. While walking, she was harassed by a man, who looked inside her chest and (presumably) noticed the coil and lost interest in her. She walks into the Won's brothers hideout. She was then cornered by Every Won, who stepped on the end of her tail, causing her to go unconscious. Kyouma is surprised when Every Won kidnaps a girl, but Kyouma deals with the criminals anyway. Jony Won attempts to take the girl as a hostage, but Kyouma remains unmoved. The girl is forced to defend herself, throwing a couch at Jony and revealing herself to be a robot. She slaps Kyouma unconscious in embarrassment and escapes with most of the illegal Coils. Kyouma is later woken by his old friend Albert Schuman, who chides him for falling asleep on the job. Kyouma brushes him off and pursues the girl, capturing her and the illegal Coils. Meanwhile, Albert locates Shido Yurizaki and asks him to return to New Tesla Energy. Shido refuses, activating a device that burns out all Coils nearby before vanishing in a pillar of green light, also shutting down the robot girl. Kyouma takes her to Mary's laboratory, where she is examined and reactivated by Koorogi. After getting over her unease of being exposed on the examination table, the girl begs Kyouma and Mary to let her become a Collector.
2	"Loser"; Transliteration: "Rūzā" (Japanese: ルーザー)	Akihisa Shibata	Shōtarō Suga	Michio Fukuda	17 January 2016	6 March 2016	
Kyouma reluctantly agrees to work with the robot girl, Mira Yurizaki, who believes that her "father" Shido is dead. The two go to a highly publicized event of the masked art thief nicknamed "Loser", as he never succeeds in his heists. While Mira traces the source of Loser's camera feeds, Kyouma infiltrates the museum and confronts Loser himself. While making their way down to the museum's new exhibit, Loser lets on that he knows about Kyouma's past, and that the art piece contains his real target, that being one of the special Coils called Numbers. However, the museum curator gets impatient and uses a pair of female robotic dolls powered by illegal Coils to attack Kyouma and Loser. Kyouma neutralizes the dolls, while Loser escapes with Number 007. The frightened curator tries to conceal the damaged illegal Coils from being discovered in the dolls, causing a catastrophic malfunction and a dimensional collapse. This results in his body cloning and merging with the dolls in a grotesque mess. Meanwhile, Mira finds Loser's assistant and daughter, Elizabeth "Ellie" Greenhough-Smith, by tracking her robotic surveillance pigeons.
3	"Chase the Numbers"; Transliteration: "Nanbāzu o Oe" (Japanese: ナンバーズを追え)	Mitsutaka Noshitani	Shōtarō Suga	Toshiyuki Kono	24 January 2016	13 March 2016	
Mira is paid six million yen by Mary for collecting the pigeons powered by illegal Coils, and Kyouma helps her purchase a trailer so she can have her own private space. She cleans and furnishes her trailer, and meets the four children who play around the auto yard. Three of them are endangered when a stack of wrecked cars collapses, and Mira reveals her robotic abilities to save them from being crushed. Meanwhile, Kyouma leaves to see Dendendo, a contact who shares information about the Numbers, New Tesla Energy Coil prototypes made before the large stabilizing towers were built, which draw energy from the depths of Dimension W, making them powerful and potentially dangerous. Although the police later investigate Kyouma for possible negligence of his property, he is released on the word of Claire Skyheart, Chief Operations Officer (C.O.O.) of New Tesla Energy Central 47 and grandmother of one of the children, Shiora Skyheart. Later, the children visit Mira, agreeing to keep the secret that she is a robot. Albert gives Claire his final report on the incident with Shido, and they discuss plans for Kyouma.
4	"The Mystery Hidden in Lake Yasogami"; Transliteration: "Yasogamiko ni Hisomu Nazo" (Japanese: 八十神湖に潜む謎)	Takuma Suzuki	Shōtarō Suga & Yūichirō Matsuya	Kanta Kamei	31 January 2016	20 March 2016	
Albert hires Kyouma to investigate the drowning of reclusive mystery novelist Shijuro Sakaki in his room at his remote hotel on Yasogami Lake, infamous for ghost sightings. On the way, Mira becomes unnerved after seeing a ghost, though there is no record in her memory logs. Kyouma visits a memorial near the hydroelectric dam built 21 years ago, while Mira scans Shijuro's books containing gruesome ghost stories. Albert reveals to Kyouma that a student intern named Haruna Enamori activated Number 189 back then, in which two search parties died in attempts to recover this Coil, and the ghost sightings have now returned after they ceased a decade ago when Shijuro bought the hotel. Koorogi restores a household robot's memory, which shows Shijuro being attacked by spectral figures, hinting that the robot was previously unable to sense their dimensional materialization. While visually reconstructing Yasogami Village, Mira finds herself trapped in a vision, which overlaps the past and present, and is attacked by a ghost. Meanwhile, a journalist is drowned in a van, and three other guests kidnap Shijuro's sister, Marisa Sakaki. Mira is shackled by Shiro Kamiki, who calls himself Shijuro Sakaki in Mira's presence.
5	"The Possibilities of the Dead"; Transliteration: "Mōja no Kanōsei" (Japanese: 亡者の可能性)	Tadahito Matsubayashi	Yūichirō Matsuya	Michio Fukuda	7 February 2016	27 March 2016	
Shiro tells Mira of his plan to protect his world by exterminating anyone who poses a threat. Spectral figures rise out of the fog to attack those at the hotel. After Kyouma notices that they are affected by bottled water, Albert triggers the fire sprinklers to stop them. Mira struggles with her own mortality and frees herself by enforcing her logic on the alternate world. As Mira tells Kyouma that Number 189 is hidden inside the dam, they race there as she explains that this Coil has stored an alternate reality in Dimension W of the night of the flooding caused by Shiro. He was able to save the other student interns from drowning in the floodwaters except Marisa. Shiro then changed his name to Shijuro and kept his friends alive with Number 189, protecting them from the real world. Kyouma soaks himself in spring water to fight Shiro, while Mira shatters Shiro's perceptions, enabling him to see Marisa, who had in fact survived. Mira powers down Number 189, destroying the alternate reality and everyone within it.
6	"The Wind of Africa"; Transliteration: "Afurika no Kaze" (Japanese: アフリカの風)	Yoshito Hata	Ryō Higaki	Hiroaki Shimura	14 February 2016	3 April 2016	
Prince Salva-Enna-Tibesti, Chief Executive Officer (C.E.O.) of robot manufacturer Islero and C.O.O. of New Tesla Energy Central 60, arrives in Japan. Salva's younger brother, Prince Lwai-Aura-Tibesti, runs off to excitedly explore Japan, spotting Kyouma and mistaking him as a samurai. After helping Lwai evade Islero's bodyguards in transformable motorcycles, Kyouma secretly realizes that Lwai has an artificial body. The two later go to a kimono shop, and Kyouma is welcomed by his "big sister" Tsubaki Azumaya, who provides him a new happi coat. Kyouma reveals that he suffers from memory loss, making it impossible for him to accept and forgive certain things, including his involvement in his fiancee Miyabi Azumaya five years ago. However, Kyouma now vows to get back what he lost. Salva's retainer, Lashiti, arrives to reclaim Lwai, who obediently goes along. Salva sends Lwai to Mary's house that night, where he immediately attacks and severely damages her robot bodyguard Four before leaving a letter of a challenge for the Collectors, which will take place at the forbidden ruin of Easter Island in seven days. Salva tells Claire that he intends to start a war in order to avoid a war.
7	"The Voice Calling from the Past"; Transliteration: "Kako Kara no Yobigoe" (Japanese: 過去からの呼び声)	Yasushi Muroya	Ryō Higaki	Kanta Kamei	21 February 2016	10 April 2016	
In the past, Kyouma fell in love with Miyabi. He joined the special-ops unit Grendel in a deal with Seira Yurizaki to save Miyabi from an incurable muscular disease. Grendel was sent to recapture facilities on Easter Island, where the biggest dimensional malfunction in history occurred, but Kyouma does not remember what happened. Despite Grendel winning the war, the surgery for Miyabi was deemed a failure. From then on, Kyouma hated the Coils for stealing what was most precious to him. In the present, Salva explains to New Tesla Energy that he has summoned several Collectors to investigate Easter Island for the welfare of the company. With the reward money being fifty million dollars, the Collectors are to retrieve a single Coil which has begun working and seems to be allowing the region to recover from the nothingness of possibility. They travel on an airship, which suffers power loss as it closes under adverse weather. As a strange sphere breaches the airship, the flight crew dies, and the airship crashes. Meanwhile, Kyouma and Mira also take up the invitation, and Albert flies them along a different route to Easter Island.
8	"The Island That Fell into Nothingness"; Transliteration: "Kyomu ni Ochita Shima" (Japanese: 虚無に落ちた島)	Takahiro Kawakoshi	Ryō Higaki	Hiroaki Shimura	28 February 2016	17 April 2016	
After Albert lands safely on Easter Island, Kyouma and Mira race in a V10 engine car toward the research facility and ground zero of the disaster. A flashback shows that the King of Isla adopted Salva from the Farah Royal Orphanage before later siring a natural son, Lwai. While still children, Salva told Lwai about a dream of making a world in which Lwai will rule. In the present, Yuriy Antonov, "Hero" Jason Chrysler, "Hitman" K.K., and Scorpioncats Cassidy come ashore and assist Lwai in taking Salva, Lashiti, and Sanchez, all of whom are comatose, to a log cabin for shelter. Once Lwai plays footage of Salva explaining the contest's rules, Cassidy is left behind at the log cabin. The sphere briefly reappears, but Lashiti awakes and tells Cassidy that it seems oddly disinterested in women. Large shielded robots trapped in the null possibility begin reactivating and attacking. Kyouma and Mira team up with Harry & Debby Eastriver, taking down a robot and digging through a protrusion. They have a close call passing through a region of nothingness, and Kyouma summons his courage to continue, that is until Loser unexpectedly confronts them.
9	"The Key to Adrastea"; Transliteration: "Adorasutea no Kagi" (Japanese: アドラステアの鍵)	Mitsutaka Noshitani	Ryō Higaki	Kazuyoshi Yaginuma	6 March 2016	24 April 2016	
Loser is determined to stop Kyouma until he regains the memories of his role in the destruction of Easter Island. Their confrontation is interrupted once the sphere returns, and Kyouma falls unconscious when he touches it. Kyouma and Salva seem to be reliving their pasts when Grendel was sent to Isla to protect New Tesla Energy Central 60 and help Salva put down a revolt. However, Haruka Seameyer arranged for Lwai to be caught in the crossfire by one of Salva's war machines, much to Salva's horror. New Tesla Energy learned that the man behind the Isla revolt was Seameyer, a former student of Shido. Grendel was tasked with hunting down Seameyer, who recruited many of Shido's students to revolt against New Tesla Energy. In the present, Loser and Ellie travel deeper into the laboratory, code-named Adrastea, where Loser was once a researcher named Julian Tyler. Kyouma finally realizes that he is trapped in an illusion. The sphere then approaches Kyouma, revealing itself to be Seameyer, who also wants Kyouma's memories. Meanwhile, Mira is guarding Kyouma's unconscious body when a huge robot attacks.
10	"Resurrected Nightmare"; Transliteration: "Yomigaeru Akumu" (Japanese: 蘇る悪夢)	Hiroshi Ikehata	Kanta Kamei	Kanta Kamei	13 March 2016	1 May 2016	
As Mira works with Harry & Debby to destroy the robot, Kyouma recovers to save Mira before she is nearly lost in the region of nothingness. Kyouma reveals that he woke up by removing an implant that was secretly warped in his earlobe, and that he remembers that memories are connected through dimensions. Lwai then arrives heavily damaged, warning Kyouma, Mira and Harry & Debby that K.K. and a now mind-controlled Yuriy attempted to assassinate him. Meanwhile, Chrysler confronts Loser, and it is quickly revealed that both of them are equipped with Numbers in their suits. Kyouma, Mira and Harry & Debby later encounter K.K., who tells them that he was hired to ensure that nobody else finds the Coil hidden on Easter Island and sends Yuriy to attack them. Kyouma is separated and is forced to fight one of his old Grendel teammates, Douglas Marks, who is also mind-controlled by K.K. as a puppet. Kyouma destroys Douglas's control device, putting him to rest, but K.K. escapes and kills Lwai. An enraged Kyouma is about to kill K.K. but is stopped by Mira. A second Lwai appears, explaining that he has multiple bodies.
11	"The Lost Genesis"; Transliteration: "Kieta Jeneshisu" (Japanese: 消えたジェネシス)	Masaki Tachibana	Ryō Higaki	Masaki Tachibana	20 March 2016	8 May 2016	
Loser defeats Chrysler and takes his Number 001, before proceeding with Ellie even deeper into Adrastea. Meanwhile, Lwai explains that he can remotely inhabit robot bodies from Isla, thanks to Salva. Told about the implants, Lwai wakes Salva, who joins them and explains that he is seeking Genesis, a Coil allegedly capable of creating "something from nothing", hoping it can regenerate Lwai's body. While the others hold off robots, Kyouma, Mira, Salva and Lashiti enter Adrastea. They encounter Loser, who confirms that he was a researcher and that the malfunction of an experimental transporter caused Easter Island's destruction. Loser then uses Number 006 to show the group a memory, which reveals that Loser, Shido and Seameyer had worked together to create Genesis until Shido shut down the project. This infuriated Seameyer, who descended into madness, eventually developing his own Genesis and ruthlessly experimenting on his own scientists. Seameyer is now trapped in a pocket dimension, saying that Kyouma stole Genesis from him and teleported away. After Loser asks about what Seameyer has done with his wife, Sophia Tyler, Seameyer replies that he punished her for foiling his plans by turning her into a giant monster.
12	"The Future Reached"; Transliteration: "Tadoritsuita Mirai" (Japanese: 辿りついた未来)	Yasushi Muroya & Kanta Kamei	Ryō Higaki	Kanta Kamei	27 March 2016	15 May 2016	
Loser battles Seameyer's monster but is overwhelmed. Meanwhile, Kyouma feels guilty over having caused the teleporter accident. Still, Mira points out that if it were not for him and Miyabi, she would not have existed since she was originally supposed to be Miyabi's replacement body. Remembering Miyabi, Kyouma regains his resolve and allows Mira to enter his memories to restore them. Kyouma awakens to find Salva, Lashiti, Loser, Ellie and Harry & Debby ready to help him fight Seameyer. Mira flees as her Coil begins to overload, but Seameyer captures her. However, Kyouma tauntingly allows Seameyer to look into his memories, revealing that Miyabi refused to be restored by Genesis and that Kyouma destroyed it in order to honor her wishes. Seameyer goes mad with rage but is quickly defeated by Kyouma and his friends' combined efforts. Seameyer has a dying vision of Shido comforting him in his last moments. Mira's Coil overloads, but Shido suddenly appears and entrusts Mira with a new Coil. After the battle, Loser dies from his wounds and the surviving Collectors return home. In the epilogue, Kyouma and Mira continue working together as Collectors.

==== OVAs ====
A collection of five 4-minute long non-canon original video animation (OVA) shorts called W Gate Online - Rose's Counseling Room (Wの扉 ONLINE 〜ロゼのお悩み相談室〜, W no Tobira Onrain ~Roze no o Nayami Sōdan-Shitsu~) were included on the Blu-ray release of the series. The shorts are animated in a 3D chibi style and revolve around Mira talking with Rose about her problems as a robot.

On 21 March 2016, an OVA episode was announced. It was bundled up with the anime's sixth Blu-ray release, which released on 26 August 2016.

No.	Title	Original release date	English release date	Ref.
1	"Rose's Counseling Room 1"	25 March 2016	23 May 2017	
Mira talks about how Kyouma physically and verbally abuses her and how that makes her feel.
2	"Rose's Counseling Room 2"	22 April 2016	23 May 2017	
Mira talks about seeing a ghost and Rose offers an alternative explanation.
3	"Rose's Counseling Room 3"	27 May 2016	23 May 2017	
Mira is confused about the naming of Dimension W and Rose explains why humans give things labels even if they don't always necessarily fit.
4	"Rose's Counseling Room 4"	24 June 2016	23 May 2017	
Mira complains about how Kyouma keeps calling her a piece of junk and thinks about if it has something to do with her not acting girly enough. Rose then explains to her that robots do not have any sex or gender regardless of their aesthetic characteristics.
5	"Rose's Counseling Room 5"	22 July 2016	23 May 2017	
Mira is confused about the quantum uncertainty principle and Rose tries to explain it to her by expressing the Schrödinger's cat thought experiment through dance.
6	"Do Robots Dream of Bath Houses?"; Transliteration: "Robotto wa Sentō no Yume wo Miru ka" (Japanese: ロボットは銭湯の夢を見るか)	26 August 2016	23 May 2017	
Since Kyouma forgot to pay the water bill and the water is cut off, he has no choice but to take Mira to a bathhouse. Kyouma reluctantly hangs out with Albert, as Mira and Ellie discuss why Kyouma always refers to Mira as a "piece of junk". Tsubaki, Hirose and Ayukawa from the kimono shop join Mira and Ellie, and they give Mira some basic advice about human behavior before Mira departs with Kyouma.
