= Cat Paradise =

Japanese manga series

- Cover of Cat Paradise first volume as released by Akita Shoten featuring Kansuke (left) and Yumi Hayakawa (right)

学園創世 猫天! (Gakuen Sōsei Nekoten!)
- Genre: Supernatural, Action
- Manga
- Written by: Yūji Iwahara
- Published by: Akita Shoten
- English publisher: Yen Press
- Magazine: Champion Red
- Original run: June 2006 – December 2008
- Volumes: 5

Cat Paradise (学園創世 猫天!, Gakuen Sōsei Nekoten!; lit. "Academy Genesis: Cat Heaven!") is a fantasy action manga written and illustrated by Yuji Iwahara. It was serialized in the monthly seinen manga magazine Champion Red from June 2006 to December 2008. Chapters were collected by Akita Shoten in five tankōbon volumes. Cat Paradise is licensed in North America in English by Yen Press, with the first volume released in August 2009.

The story follows the career of high school student Yumi Hayakawa and her cat, Kansuke, at Matabi Academy, where they are drawn into an ancient battle between the student council against Kaen, a long-sealed feline demon, and his minions.

== Synopsis ==
Yumi and her cat, Kansuke had just entered Matabi Academy, a school where students are allowed to have their pet cats live at the dorms. All goes quite well when they are suddenly dragged into a war that had begun long ago to stop Kaen, a great and ancient demon cat. A long time ago, he destroyed the Futakago kingdom, a kingdom that angered Kaen for some unknown reason. Since then, Princess Kiri and her cat, Shirayuki, fought him and sealed him in Futakago's barrier. Many years later, Kaen was finally sealed at Matabi Academy itself, but not before warning to return 100 years later. To prevent this from happening, Princess Kiri and Shirayuki chose a select group of students and their cats and granted them powers that best suit their talents and abilities. These students are Matabi Academy's student council and protect the school. But when Kaen's subordinate, Tsukumoishu, attacked Yumi and Kansuke, the pair was greeted by the Princess and Shirayuki and promised a great power if they chose to fight the threat of Kaen. With no choice, the seventh pair of student and cat make a pact and join this ancient battle.

== Characters ==
The main protagonists of this manga are the students and cats chosen by Princess Kiri and Shirayuki to help in the battle against Kaen. The antagonists are Kaen and his followers.

=== Protagonists ===
Yumi Hayakawa (早川優美, Hayakawa Yūmi)
A new student of Matabi Academy that chose to attend the school because she knew she would be allowed to bring her cat, Kansuke. She loves knitting and often makes outfits for Kansuke. Though clumsy and slightly silly, Yumi is also very kind and friendly. Four years ago, she dove onto the road to protect an injured Kansuke from an oncoming van. Her power manifests itself as a ball of wool (mirroring her passion for knitting), which can be used to transform Kansuke into his human form. The wool can also be reshaped into a number of other objects depending on the circumstance, such as a shield or a cushion. One drawback to her power is that it takes time to unravel, and isn't as strong when used in rapid succession. Yumi has a romantic interest in Tsubame, which developed on her first day attending the academy.
Kansuke (勘助, Kansuke)
He is Yumi's cat, a four-year-old, mixed-blood tabby with orange eyes. He sports a large scar on his forehead from when he was hit by Yumi's bike. Yumi came back to see him bleeding on the road and took him in her arms, protecting him from an oncoming van. Kansuke became her pet that day, and swore to protect her from any danger. Due to this, he has a desire to become strong. He is stubborn, strong-willed, competitive and he hates the outfits Yumi makes for him with a passion, tearing some of them up on one occasion. In his transformed state, he resembles an anthropomorphic cat. In combat, he expresses skills in agility and strength, and depending on the outfit knitted for him, he manifests different abilities.
Tsubame Akifuji (秋藤つばめ, Akifuji Tsubame) and Sakura (桜, Sakura)
Tsubame is the clerk who Yumi has romantic feelings for. He enjoys reading and is popular with both girls and cats at the school, but notes that he likes girls who are a bit silly and clumsy. His partner is the five-year-old Sakura, a pure-blood she-cat, a sister of Yamato and a descent of Shirayuki. In battle, Sakura turns into a bow that always hits its target and can see at a 360° angle.
Shin Kamio (神尾伸, Kamio Shin) and Yamato (大和, Yamato)
Kamio is the strict and serious president of the third year. He fights alone using his sword to perform powerful attacks. His partner is Yamato, a pure-blood six-year-old white tom. Yamato is Sakura's brother and a descendant of Shirayuki. He has the ability to merge with Kamio's sword, changing its appearance and strengthening its attacks. Shin and Yamato are one of the only two pairs in the series who share the same gender the other being Tsukasa Hinode and Raimu.
Kotori Hasutani (蓮谷小鳥, Hasutani Kotori) and Musashimaru (武蔵丸, Musashimaru)
Kotori is the vice-president, who has a strong beliefs that problems should be dealt with through talking instead of violence. Kotori's power is the ability to materialize food, which she gives to her partner Musashimaru, a six-year-old Persian mix. The food activates Musashimaru's power, the ability to grow in size. She is the closest to Yumi among the other guardians and often offers friendly advice and assistance. She and Kaiya are childhood friends and it is revealed that she is in love with him but won't say it.
Kaiya Yamamoto (山本海也, Yamamoto Kaiya) and Hisui (翡翠, Hisui)
Kaiya is the prefect of class, and his partner is a female Siamese cat named Hisui. Kaiya can produce a material that Hisui can levitate, which Kaiya often uses to surf in the air. Hisui refers to Kaiya as her "darling" and gets jealous very easily. He is childhood friends with Kotori Hasutani and cares very much about her well being (much to Hisui's chagrin). It is hinted he likes her but has yet to mention anything.
Futaba Aoki (青木二葉, Aoki Futaba) and Gekko (月光, Gekkō)
Futaba is the designated president of the health committee and isn't fond of people. Her partner is Gekko, a seven-year-old mix that is black in color and carries a few scars. Futaba can manipulate Gekko's shadow to do such things as create drones to spy on others and extend Gekko's shadow which then can as a portal for herself to pass through. She has used this to grab an enemy from far away.

Tsukasa Hinode (日野出司, Hinode Tsukasa) and Raimu (来夢, Raimu)
Tsukasa is the delegated of the cultural committee. He can control space and time to make people enter the dreams of Raimu, his partner. Raimu is a five-year-old Scottish Fold tom with white and tortoiseshell fur. He enjoys napping on the campus, preferranly on Tsukasa's head. Tsukasa and Raimu are one of the only two pairs in the series who share the same gender the other being Shin kamio and Yamato.
Kirihime (桐姫, Kirihime) and Shirayuki (白雪, Shirayuki)
Once the princess of all the land of Futakago, Kirihime perished when Kaen burnt her kingdom to ashes. Since then, she has reappeared to stop Kaen from continuing down his path of destruction. She and her cat, Shirayuki, then chose each of the "Paired Ones" and gave them the power to fulfill their heart's desires and fight Kaen. Shirayuki, a white cat who had died alongside Kirihime, is constantly at her side. She bears white fur and a black "V" on her chest, as well as a strange mark on her forehead that appears on the Paired Ones.
Shinpachi (シンパチ, Shinpachi)
A tabby cat that was searching for his friend Ponta, and Yumi had decided to help him. Shinpachi learned that Ponta had been devoured while protecting Yumi from Rachi, a follower of Tsukumoishu. Shinpachi decided that, because Yumi was kind to both cats and humans, she was a fine master, and became friends with both her and Kansuke.

=== Antagonists ===
Kaen (火焔, Kaen)
He is the oldest of the cat deities with two tails. His fur is covered with a black oil and his preferred weapon his fire. Kaen was jealous of the success of other kingdoms of high deities, so he destroyed them. When he destroyed Futakago's kingdom, the princess and Shirayuki swore to stop him. He succeeded in escaping from his seal, slowly plotting revenge against the humans who sealed away his kind. Kaen eventually possesses Akifuji's body in order to open the barrier, but later revealed Akifuji, discovering his ancestor's plot, willingly allowed him to.
Tsukumoisshu (九十九一首, Tsukumoisshū)
He is Kaen's subordinate who appeared before Yumi to kill her for her hair. Tsukumoisshu is a fox spirit that is very proud of his hair, made from the skulls of human victims, and shows anguish when discovering a single split end. He has the ability to summon followers of Kaen through special leaves. He took over the body of the vice-principal so he may freely move about the academy.
Rachi (螺蜘, Rachi)
One of Tsukumoishu's subordinates. She possessed a human, though her true form is that of a spider. She possesses the ability to shoot webs and summon other spiders, and her spider legs are especially sharp. The spiders she summons are her "babies" and warns that if a person gets bit even once, they will die. She had to go back to the place under ground after the fight because she lost.
Kibao (牙王, Kibaō)
The second of Kaen's subordinates that is met, he is a wolf spirit beast. Unlike the others, he freely prefers to stay in a half-transformed state, giving his animal head and limbs to a human body. It was revealed later he had possessed Kaiya, who had allowed him in when he sensed Kibao's true nature. Unlike the rest of the spirit beasts, Kibao feels war with humans will end in disaster and only wishes for his kind to be free.
Daraku (沱邏玖, Daraku)
Another of Kaen's subordinates. He possesses a heavy-set student, but his true form is a gigantic catfish that can control the dead through mist. He was inevitably defeated by a combination effort of Yumi, Kotori, Shin, and their cats.
Hakubi (白尾, Hakubi)
One of Kaen's subordinates, who possesses a teenage boy. His true form is a giant white dragon that possesses powerful scales that he can use as projectiles. He believes himself to be the last of his kind, but at the end of the series maintains hope that there may be more of his kind still alive.
Sakira (沙姫羅, Sakira)
The last of Kaen's subordinates to be met, she is a snake spirit beast that possesses the body of a teenage girl. She also has a younger brother; another snake who coils and drapes around her human body. The two are able to hypnotize others do their bidding or immobilize their victims. After attempting to eat Futaba and Gekko, Sakira and her brother are defeated by Tsukasa and Raimu.
Akitaka Sandou (桟道阿騎隆, Sandō Akitaka)
The true antagonist of the series. He was originally Nobuhisa Sandou, a retainer to Futago and the princess's fiancé. Sandou was the one who planned the sealing of the spirit beasts, but was mortally wounded in Kaen's invasion. In his last breath though, Sandou managed to succeed sealing the beasts away. Because of the princess's wish to become part of the barrier, as a side effect, Sandou continually reincarnated every time he died. He used this to meet with Kaen in the future, manipulating him into creating the second barrier in attempt to break the first. In truth, Sandou wanted only power and eventually succeeded, becoming invincible against the powers of the Spirit Beasts. Kaen and Akifuji, however, revealed their alliance against him and fought against him. It was revealed despite Sandou's newfound power, he was powerless against normal attacks from regular creatures. Akifuji and Kaen distracted him long enough for a depowered Kansuke to slice his throat with the Dagger of Futago held in his mouth. This causes him to lose all his powers, allowing Kaen to finish him off with his flames.

== Media ==
=== Manga ===
The manga series Cat Paradise was written and illustrated by Yuji Iwahara, and was serialized in the monthly seinen manga magazine Champion Red from June 2006 to December 2008. Akita Shoten collected the individual chapters in five tankōbon volumes between May 2007 and December 2008. The series has been licensed in North America in English by Yen Press, who released the first volume in August 2009, and in Taiwan by Tong Li.

No.	Original release date	Original ISBN	English release date	English ISBN
1	May 18, 2007	978-4-253-23261-6	August 2009	978-0-7595-2923-6
2	May 18, 2007	978-4-253-23262-3	November 2009	978-0-7595-2924-3
3	December 20, 2007	978-4-253-23263-0	January 2010	978-0-316-07735-4
4	June 20, 2008	978-4-253-23264-7	May 2010	978-0-316-07736-1
5	December 19, 2008	978-4-253-23265-4	September 2010	978-0-316-07737-8

=== Drama CD ===
Cat Paradise was adapted as a single drama CD released by Frontier Works on July 24, 2008.

Cast

- Yumi Hayakawa: Aya Hirano
- Kansuke: Yūki Tai
- Tsubame Akifuji: Hiro Shimono
- Kotori Hasutani: Akemi Kanda
- Princess Kirihime: Maria Yamamoto
