= King of Thorn =

Japanese manga series

- Cover of the second volume

いばらの王 (Ibara no Ō)
- Genre: Dark fantasy; Psychological thriller; Science fiction
- Manga
- Written by: Yūji Iwahara
- Published by: Enterbrain
- English publisher: AUS: Madman Entertainment; NA: Tokyopop
- Magazine: Comic Beam
- Original run: October 2002 – October 2005
- Volumes: 6
- Anime film
- Directed by: Kazuyoshi Katayama
- Produced by: Jun'ichi Kimura; Yoshimasa Tsuchiya
- Written by: Kazuyoshi Katayama; Hiroshi Yamaguchi
- Music by: Toshihiko Sahashi
- Studio: Sunrise
- Licensed by: AUS: Madman Entertainment; NA: Funimation; UK: Manga Entertainment
- Released: May 1, 2010
- Runtime: 109 minutes

King of Thorn (Japanese: いばらの王, Hepburn: Ibara no Ō) is a Japanese fantastique manga series written and illustrated by Yuji Iwahara. It was published by Enterbrain in the seinen magazine Monthly Comic Beam between October 2002 and October 2005 and collected in six bound volumes. It is licensed in North America by Tokyopop, with the final volume published in November 2008. The series is about a group of people who are put in suspended animation to escape a mysterious plague that turns people to stone, and upon waking there appears to be only seven survivors in a world run wild—including a Japanese teenage girl named Kasumi Ishiki and a British man named Marco Owen. The survivors soon discover that the entire ruin is filled with strange, dinosaur-like creatures and other monstrous aberrations of nature. Thinking that a great amount of time passed since their arrival on the island, soon the survivors discover not only that their sleep was indeed too short to label such dramatic changes as natural occurrence, but also that the situation in and of itself is far greater than they could imagine.

A feature anime film adaptation produced by Sunrise and directed by Kazuyoshi Katayama was released on May 1, 2010.

== Plot ==
King of Thorn is a science fiction survivor drama. After a viral infection known as the Medusa virus lands in Siberia and spreads contagiously throughout Earth, 160 humans are chosen as candidates to experiment a cure against the virus by an organization called Venus Gate. As the story begins, Kasumi is selected as one of the 160 people for the experiment. She is forced to enter treatment and cold sleep without her twin sister Shizuku, whom she cares much about.

However, 48 hours later, some of those put in hibernation abruptly woke up, only to find the facility where they were supposed to be treated in a total state of decay, invaded by a lush jungles of trees and especially strange vines covered in thorns, which appear to have something of a mind on their own. Not only that, but the survivors soon discover that the entire ruin is filled with strange monsters and other aberrations of nature. Thinking that a great amount of time passed since their arrival on the island, soon the survivors discover not only that their sleep was indeed too short to label such dramatic changes as natural occurrence, but also that the situation in and of itself is far greater than they could imagine.

=== The Medusa Virus ===
One pivotal role in the series is that covered by the Medusa virus, a mortal disease so named after the Medusa from Greek Mythology, the Gorgon whose eyesight could turn anyone and anything into stone at a mere glance. The virus itself is extremely virulent, infecting its victims' cells and causing seizures while drying up the body, turning the infected into a solid, stone-like corpse.

While perceived as a terrible malady by the world, in reality the Medusa virus is not a virus at all, being a shapeless presence brought to Earth from outer space. It landed in Siberia during a meteor shower, by chance near a young boy and his pet deer, enough to instantly infect both him and his animal. Unknowingly bringing the concentrated thing to his home, he infected his whole family and his sister Alice. She unknowingly uncovered the true nature of Medusa when her imaginary friend, a cat-boy hybrid, came to life by erupting from her back. Terrified by the death of her family and the fact that the newborn creature devoured her brother's deer, she trapped it in her house and set it on fire, thus spreading Medusa all over the world through the fire's smoke.

It was then that the people affiliated with Venus Gate, a religious sect, showed themselves and approached Alice, believing her ability to turn imagination into reality to be a gift from the heavens. Experimenting on her and Medusa, during that time they employed a hacker named Zeus as their security specialist, though in doing so they doomed themselves when he, pursuing his crazy dreams, developed an artificial way to force dreams into suitable hosts and, thus, fabricate mind-created realities at will to accomplish his plan to force the world into a primal survival game to amuse himself.

== Characters ==
Kasumi Ishiki
Voiced by: Kana Hanazawa (Japanese); Brina Palencia (English)
Kasumi is the main protagonist of the story, which for the most part is told by her point of view. One of the 160 people around the world lucky (or rich) enough to be chosen as potential cure testbeds for the Medusa virus, she left the world leaving behind herself and her twin sister Shizuku, who was also a victim of the virus, though until the end encouraged Kasumi to accept such an opportunity and be cured. She was the first of these people to be awakened and the first to find the ruin that struck the medical facility they were treated in. A shy and gentle girl, she was notable in that she was the only one who actually supported the thuggish-looking Marco when the survivors started their escape, something that eventually turned into a crush, though ill-advised by more than one of the other characters, who saw Marco as dangerous and untrustworthy.
Occasional glimpses are offered on Kasumi's life prior to her being chosen: she was quiet and reserved, the foil of her twin sister in mind, though identical in body, save for the fact that she wore glasses. These flashbacks show that Kasumi was strongly attached to Shizuku, to the point of borderline obsession, which in turn not only fueled unstable thoughts, such as wishing to die in the same way at the same time, but also gave birth to suicidal tendencies that manifested themselves when Kasumi, while bathing, tried to take her life by slitting her wrist with a razor, unable to accept the idea of living in a world without her beloved sister. Shizuku was nearby and saved her sister, though their bond was greatly shaken.
Only at the end of the series, it was revealed that Kasumi was dead all along: before parting, she and Shizuku shared a brief moment together on the cliffs near the castle that housed the medical treatment facility, and during this instance Kasumi, still unwilling to be the only one to survive, wished for the two of them to die together by jumping down the cliff. Rejected by Shizuku, Kasumi was accidentally thrown over the edge during the ensuing struggle and killed, an event that unleashed her sister's Medusa powers and, with them, the chaos that would envelop the island and the world itself. The Kasumi the viewer sees during the entire story is, in fact, a Medusa-produced entity created by Shizuku, who wished for her sister to be alive no matter what, even at the expense of the world.
In the film version, she and Tim are left as the only survivors at the facility, with Kasumi vowing to help him reunite with his parents.
Marco Owen
Voiced by: Toshiyuki Morikawa (Japanese); Patrick Seitz (English)
Marco is the main male character of the series. He is a fearsome-looking man with a muscular frame and many intimidating tattoos all over his body who is also an expert hacker, so much so that he was able to crack through the CIA's computers – and those of Venus Gate, something that had him arrested and incarcerated for more than half a century (during the events of the manga, he still had 60 years to serve in prison). While a prisoner he was approached by the NSA, which offered him complete parole for his crimes in exchange of his help in dealing with the Medusa affair. Becoming a de facto spy for the United States, he was sent as a patient to the gathering at Venus Gate labs, the same where all the other main characters were sent, in order to assess the objectives of the gathering, gather evidence on the mysterious Level 4 labs of the island, and also to pursue a personal vendetta against his old friend Zeus, who framed him for crimes he did not commit before vanishing. He was trying to accomplish what he was sent to do when the Medusa outbreak and Shizuku's awakening occurred, and in the ensuing chaos he was left unconscious. Thus, he was able to present himself to the other survivors as one of them.
During most of the series Marco acts tough, and his overall appearance and mannerism leave the other survivor highly suspicious of him, especially when they discover that he never had the Medusa virus in the first place. Nevertheless, given the fact that he is the most skilled of them all, Marco is silently accepted as the leader of the group, at least until he goes on his own to try to find Zeus. He was also the first of them to encounter the ghostly apparition of Alice, and on more than one instance was seen arguing with her. Also, he himself was suspicious of Kasumi after seeing video footage of her twin sister Shizuku trailing after the wave of monstrous beings that erupted from Level 4.
During the climax of the story he died once, killed by Zeus's artificially created beast soldiers, though his corpse was later found and resurrected by Alice, a deed for which she sacrificed her life. He was thus able to face Zeus head-on by literally hacking into him and, finally, completely erasing him for good. What happened to him and Kasumi after they saved themselves is left to the reader to speculate, though apparently their feelings for each other were mutual.
In the film version, he succumbs to his injuries after making Kasumi promise him to live life to the fullest and to not take it for granted: "Please, grant a soldier his dying wish." She then kisses him goodbye and thanks him for all he did for her, intending to follow her promise.
Katherine Turner
Voiced by: Sayaka Ohara (Japanese); Stephanie Young (English)
Katherine is a pretty young woman in her late twenties and the worst Medusa case among the survivors, being the most infected one of them all. Since their encounter she acts in a motherly way towards Tim, the youngest of them being only a little boy. Before becoming infected, Katherine was an alcoholic and was prone to abuse her son Michael, until he was taken away from her and placed in foster care. This events shook her greatly and left her with bitter disgust for herself, prompting her to try to be a true mother for Tim as she wasn't for her son.
Later in the story, the Medusa infection in her completely consumes her body, which starts to crumble apart during an assault of monstrous creatures. On the verge of death she deliberately stabs herself, triggering the Medusa inside her and becoming what she believed was the figure of an ideal mother, a harpy-like creature. While still capable of recognizing Tim and the other survivors, she herself was nothing more than what Katherine's heart and memories were at the moment of her death. Nevertheless, she still showed the same attachment to Tim and fought against the monsters threatening him, though she was seriously wounded and was left with the boy to recover. Later captured by Zeus' soldiers, she was set free during the end.
In the film version, she succumbs to the Medusa virus during a helicopter crash.
Peter Stevens
Voiced by: Shinichiro Miki (Japanese); Christopher Bevins (English)
Peter was an engineer and doctor, the creator of the cold sleep capsules used by Kasumi and the other people gathered by Venus Gate. Despite his success in creating stable prototypes of the capsules, a sudden crisis of the electronics market left him without financial support, until Venus Gate expressed interest in his project and hired him and his colleagues. He succeeded in perfecting the cold sleep capsules and gained access to most of Venus Gate's labs, though he never clearly understood what the mysterious Level 4 was for. However, after developing the capsule he was suddenly withdrawn from the project, which was in turn passed to Level 4 and left him bitter with resentment, so much so that his only obsession became to retrieve his cold sleep capsule from Venus Gate. He apparently succeeded in discovering the Level 4 data, though in doing so he was discovered and taken prisoner, after which he was infected with Medusa.
While awoken with the other survivors, Peter turned traitor on them when he took Kasumi with himself (this being a mind-planted instinct forced by Zeus) and searched for the laptop containing the downloaded files. He paid for this search with his life when the room where he was suddenly crumbled on him, killing him. Nevertheless, as he was infected with Medusa, he managed to come back to life as a twisted being filled with insects and cockroaches. Taken prisoner while trying to get back his original, first cold sleep capsule, he was killed by Zeus when he tried to attack him.
In the film version, he's beheaded by one of the creatures unintentionally imagined by Tim after giving Kasumi vital information on the CSCC.
Alexandro Pecchino (The Senator)
Voiced by: Kousei Hirota (Japanese); R Bruce Elliott (English)
Alexandro is an elderly white man and a politician who bought his place among those chosen to be cured, he was gruff and cowardly, always putting his well-being before that of others. He was the first one to notice that Marco Owen was a dangerous criminal by seeing his tattoos, sparking a brief but intense confrontation which fortunately ended thanks to Peter's reasoning and Kasumi's pleas. He was devoured alive by ferocious, over-sized eels while the group was traveling through an underground flooded tunnel in the manga version and beheaded by one of Tim's imagined dinosaur-like creatures in the film version.
Timothy Laisenbach (Tim)
Voiced by: Akiko Yajima (Japanese); Luci Christian (English)
Timothy is a very young boy (possibly no more than six years old) hailing from Germany, who is infected with the virus. Quite resilient and mature despite his age, he formed a tight bond with Katherine, seeing her as if she was his mother, though calling her auntie in the process. Due to him being so young, his role is relatively minor, though sometimes he proved himself to be a precious asset to the team. It was reviewed that Tim was controlled by Alice as a guide from time to time. He would space out and lead the way. Then when the group was where Alice wanted them to be he snapped back to his real self. He was also one of the survivors at the end of the story and began looking for his parents with Kasumi.
In the film version, we learn that Tim's parents are divorced and in the midst of a less-than-amicable custody battle over him, something that upsets him greatly.
Ron Portman
Voiced by: Kenji Nomura (Japanese); Bob Carter (English)
Ron is a black police officer from the US. The most physically strong of the survivors, he was something of a fatalist, frequently lamenting on how hopeless the situation was and how useless struggling to survive would be. Despite his lack of optimism, he nevertheless tried to escape with his life, though he refused to enter Level 4 and was left behind, his leg injured. He was the first to witness Peter's revived, insect-filled Medusa form, at whose sight he became frightened and ran away, struggling by himself against the perils of the ruined facility. He almost drowned when Marco, oblivious of Ron's presence, drained the facility's main shaft from a massive flood, and later reunited himself with Kasumi, Tim and Katherine. His fatalistic approaches gone, this time he stood firm with the conviction of protecting not only himself, but also those with him, which prompted him to rescue Katherine despite her being on the verge of death.
Captured by Zeus with Tim, he too was to be transformed into a beast soldier, though when saved by Marco he remained mostly human, save for his hair, which turned pink.
In the film version, he succumbs to the Medusa virus while trying to hold off one of the creatures, allowing the others to keep moving.
Alice Roznovski
Voiced by: Misaki Kuno (Japanese); Monica Rial (English)
Alice is a Russian little girl and the younger sister of the boy who firstly came into contact with the Medusa virus during the meteor shower in Siberia. It is hinted, and later confirmed by herself, that she was abused by her family, and thus suffered from dissociative identity disorder, using an imaginary friend, a cat-boy named Laloo as a means to endure her harsh life. She was the sole survivor of her whole family when they all died due to the Medusa infection, and in such a moment she unconsciously gave birth — literally — to her imaginary friend, which emerged from her own body and started devouring her brother's deer. Frightened, Alice locked him up and set her house on fire, destroying her family's corpses and killing Laloo, but also spreading Medusa around the world thanks to the fire's smokes.
It was after the fire that she was approached by Karol Vega, who took her in and used her as a guinea pig for his experiments with the cold capsules created by Peter Stevens. What happened to her was initially left unknown, and Alice was firstly introduced to the reader as something of a malevolent apparition, often smirking cruelly at the survivors' struggles or talking to the massive monstrosity that was Shizuku. Only later, when Kasumi encountered her, she revealed herself to be a mere ghost, a projection of the mind of the real Alice, still locked into a sealed lab deep inside Level 4. Apparently she never aged, and after all the experiments she endured, what was left of her was only her head, her left arm, and a portion of her chest large enough to contain her heart and one lung, kept alive by medical equipment and the sheer power of Medusa. As a tribute to her namesake, she was guarded by a massive white rabbit automaton born from her imagination.
When Zeus' army stormed the lab she was sealed in, she escaped, though doing so put her life at great risk. After discovering Marco's corpse, she burned what was left of her life to resurrect him, vanishing after performing such an act.
Shizuku Ishiki
Voiced by: Eri Sendai (Japanese); Alexis Tipton (English)
Shizuku is Kasumi's twin sister who is identical to her if not only for their hairstyle, the fact that Shizuku doesn't wear glasses and she has an upbeat and cheerful personality. Infected with Medusa, despite being left out of those chosen to be cured, who included her own sister, she greatly supported her and insisted that she avail the opportunity to be saved from Medusa. However, their bond grew increasingly strained after Shizuku witnessed Kasumi trying to kill herself, and again when, before parting with each other, Kasumi wished for them to commit suicide together, being incapable to accept a world without her twin. During the ensuing struggle Shizuku accidentally pushed Kasumi over the edge of the cliff they were standing on, and shocked at the death of her sister, awakened her Medusa power.
Transported into Level 4, still overwhelmed by the memory of her sister's death, Shizuku created a countless amount of abominations, initially blobs of quivering flesh, maws and claws which laid waste to the labs while massacring the staff, and only through Zeus' mind-controlling program conceiving the creatures that would populate the ruined island, such as the dinosaurs encountered by the protagonists at the beginning. Also, it is revealed that the monstrous behemoth encountered at the beginning of the manga, and later shown occasionally as the "mother" of the creatures, was Shizuku herself, the beast being an unconscious armor to seal herself from the world.
While often mentioned by Kasumi during the course of the story, Shizuku appeared often, other than in her monstrous form, through ominous apparitions, often Kasumi's delusions or unconscious mental links between the sisters, and only in the end she appeared at the core of her mutated form, begging Kasumi not to uncover the fact that she was only a Medusa-made creation, and that her true self had died. With the death of Zeus, she too ceased to exist, her monstrous body crumbling to pieces and her essence fading away peacefully.
Zeus
Zeus is considered to be the best hacker in the world and a closely observed subject by both NSA and CIA, Zeus is the main antagonist of the series and the archenemy of Marco. The two were apparently rivals in their past, until Zeus broke into the CIA mainframe and then framed Marco for the crime, escaping soon after. At some point he was approached by Karol Vega and made security chief for Venus Gate's labs, especially Level 4, for which he created the tight security systems. A deeply disturbed person, he saw war, strife and conflict as a boring, unrealistic form of entertainment, and claimed that humanity as a species had lost its will to survive. Keeping such ideas a secret from his employers, he devised a way to control Medusa carriers at will, applying it to Shizuku when he found she was much more powerful a carrier than Alice herself. His last act as a human being was amusing himself while looking at Shizuku creating deformed aberrations, before turning his own self into data and entwining it with the monster Shizuku would later become.
Zeus was only seen or mentioned in flashbacks during the course of the story until the end, where he presented himself and declared his will to use Shizuku, a never-ending supply of creatures defying the laws of nature, to build up his own army of beastmen warriors and other fantasy-like beings and with them plunder the world into chaos, an endless game of survival for his own amusement. To do so, and knowing that Shizuku would wake up her sister from her induced slumber, he tampered with the other survivors' minds, forcing them to unconsciously not run away after waking up, and especially protect Kasumi's life, which was necessary to coerce Shizuku in doing his biddings.
His material body reduced to a rotting corpse, Zeus manifested himself through membranes expelled by Shizuku's tail, and later took direct control of her, declaring the act to be "the birth of a god". This final act proved to be fatal, as he was first weakened when Kasumi and Shizuku encountered each other, and then completely erased when Marco hacked into his data, deleting him.
Zeus does not appear in the film version.
Ivan Coral Vega
Voiced by: Tsutomu Isobe (Japanese); John Swasey (English)
Ivan was the Russian founder of Venus Gate, a religious cult which came to see the power of Medusa as a gift from God himself, and which took Alice in after discovering her in Siberia. Though her suffering could be attributed to him and his religious views could have been easily labeled as senseless fanaticism, Vega was indeed left speechless and horrified by the sheer cruelty of Zeus, whose true identity and goals he was oblivious of, and during the chaotic outbreak at Level 4 he sealed himself inside his study, deep in the facility. He recorded the entire story of how Medusa came into being, how it could turn imagination into reality and what really happened in the lab, ending his last speech asking Alice for forgiveness, before killing himself with a shotgun blast in his mouth.
Much later in the story, Vega's dead body would be discovered by Kasumi, Marco, Kathrine and Tim.
In the film version, he attempts suicide with a pistol before Kasumi intervened with a shotgun, then appears to die when the floor beneath him collapses.

== Media ==
=== Manga ===
King of Thorn was serialized by Enterbrain in Monthly Comic Beam from October 2002 to October 2005, and collected in six bound volumes. It is published in North America by Tokyopop, in Germany and Hungary by Tokyopop Germany, in France by Soleil, in Italy by Flashbook, and in Spain by Glénat.

No.	Original release date	Original ISBN	North America release date	North America ISBN
1	2003-04-25	4-7577-1380-0	2007-06-01	978-1-59816-235-6
01. "The Chosen Ones"; 02. "The People Trapped by Thorns"; 03. "That Day"; 04. "Face the Future"; 05. "The Thorn Girl"; Postscript
2	2003-09-25	4-7577-1585-4	2007-10-09	978-1-59816-236-3
06. "Beyond the Dark Water"; 07. "One Down"; 08. "A Step to the Truth"; 09. "Level 4"; 10. "The Beat of Battle"; 11. "The Crown of Crosses and Thorns"; Postscript
3	2004-02-25	4-7577-1770-9	2008-02-05	978-1-59816-237-0
12. "The Ends of the World"; 13. "Deep Rift"; 14. "Dangerous Place"; 15. "What Really Happened That Day"; 16. "The Secrets of the Water"; 17. "The Rules of Trust"; Postscript
4	2004-09-25	4-7577-1987-6	2008-05-06	978-1-59816-238-7
18. "The Truth Behind Medusa"; 19. "Freefall"; 20. "Marco's Enemy"; 21. "The Bird to the Cage, Part 1"; 22. "The Bird to the Cage, Part 2"; 23. "The Bird to the Cage, Part 3"; 24. "Open Wound"; Postscript
5	2005-05-30	4-7577-2303-2	2008-08-05	978-1-4278-0010-7
25. "Loss"; 26. "A Part of the Heart"; 27. "Reunion with the Nemesis"; 28. "Alice's World"; 29. "Weakness and Reality"; 30. "Shizuku's Existence"; 31. "Conceit"; Postscript
6	2005-10-24	4-7577-2478-0	2008-11-04	978-1-4278-0011-4
32. "Marco's Death"; 33. "Reunion"; 34. "Resurrection"; 35. "The Final Fight"; 36. "Deep Thrench"; Final. "Beyond the Emotions"; Bonus. "Now What?"

The Japanese volume 4 was also released in a special edition (ISBN 4-7577-1988-4) including a limited edition figurine of Kasumi.

=== Film ===
An anime film adaptation produced by Kadokawa Pictures premiered in October 2009 at the Sitges Film Festival and was released in theaters in Japan on May 1, 2010, in Japan and was released on DVD and Blu-ray Disc in Japan on October 27, 2010, and worldwide in November 2010. The film was directed by Kazuyoshi Katayama from a script written by Katayama and Hiroshi Yamaguchi, with characters designed by Hidenori Matsubara and monsters designed by Kenji Andou.

The film retains the same characters from the manga, but it takes major liberties when it comes to the plot and storyline. All of the main characters' backstories are drained down and their different storylines are changed from their counterparts in the manga. Zeus, who is a major antagonist in the manga, does not appear in the film. Alice, the young Russian girl, does make an appearance, but is deceased in present time. Terry Notary (In the English Dub) portrays the monsters in his CGI suit while Toru Nara (In the Japanese Dub) voices them. The film also has a different ending from the manga.

The ending song for the film is "Edge of This World" by Misia.

The anime has been licensed by Funimation Entertainment in North America, Manga Entertainment in the UK and Madman Entertainment in Australia and New Zealand.

== Reception ==
=== Manga ===
The English edition of King of Thorn was named by the Young Adult Library Services Association as among the 10 best graphic novels for teens for 2008. Volume one was praised by Publishers Weekly as "a gripping entry in the genre of violent survivor manga," and praised Iwahara's art for conveying the character's claustrophobia without confusing the reader. Theron Martin of Anime News Network found both the writing and artwork effectively convey the characters' tension and danger, but claimed that Iwahara's borrowing elements from many sources did not initially create an original work, but that as the series progresses it "offer[s] some intriguing twists on sci fi and horror gimmicks." Iwahara's art was singled out for praise, especially for conveying action scenes.

=== Film ===
The Encyclopedia of Science Fiction described King of Thorn as an entertaining science fiction horror film despite significant narrative shortcomings. It criticized the adaptation's attempt to condense the original lengthy manga into a single feature film, arguing that the resulting story was rushed and lacked coherence, partly because of the numerous changes made to the source material. The encyclopedia also found the film's parallels with Sleeping Beauty somewhat forced and noted that the central threat posed by the Medusa pandemic remained unresolved. Nevertheless, it praised the film's plentiful action, solid animation, graphic violence and imaginative science-fiction concepts, concluding that these elements made it an enjoyable horror film when viewed without excessive scrutiny.

The film was nominated for the 4th Asia Pacific Screen Award for Best Animated Feature Film.
