= Stephanie Young =

American voice actress

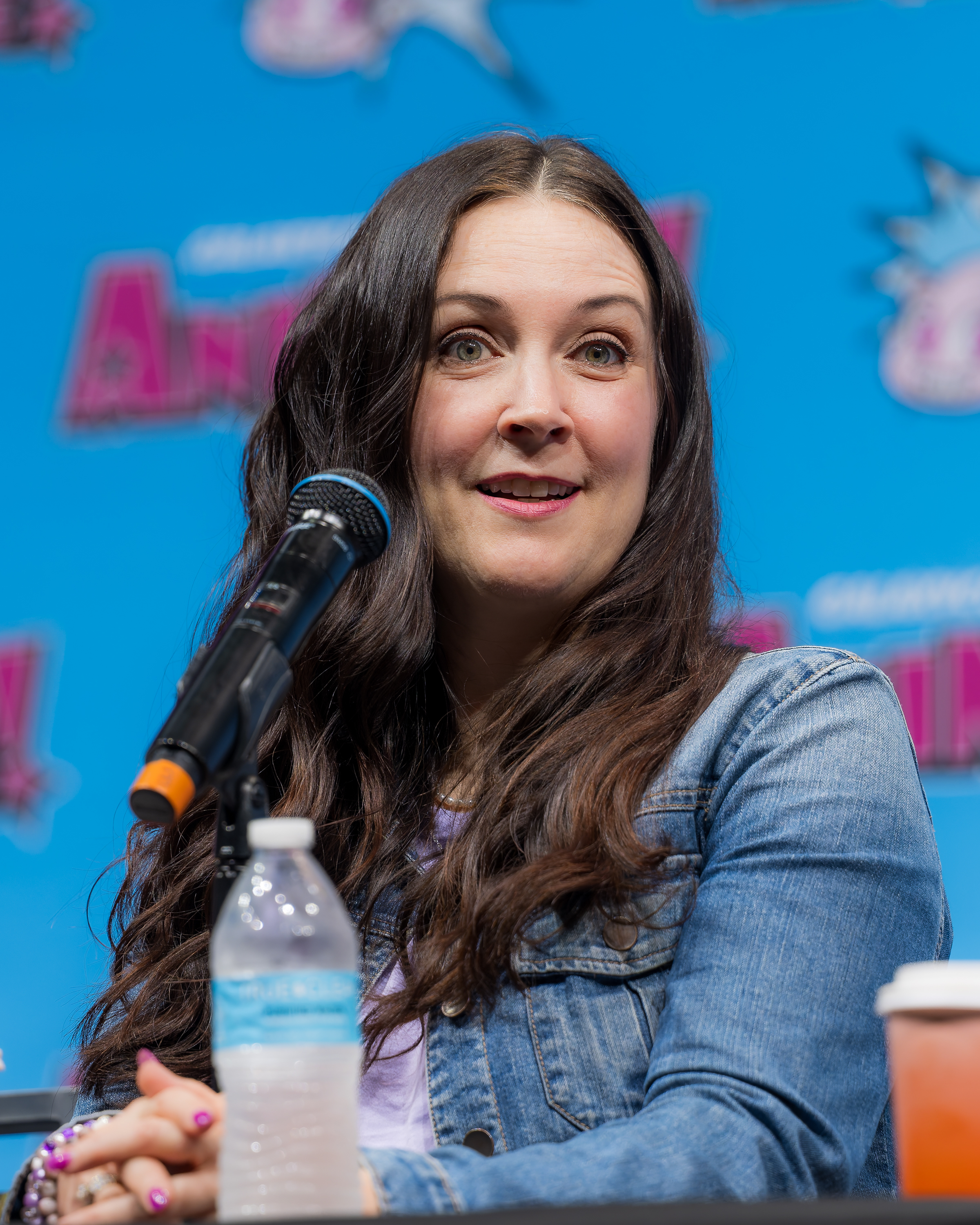
- Young at Animate! Orlando in 2026
- Born: April 3
- Education: Baylor University
- Occupation: Voice actress
- Years active: 2004–present
- Spouse: David Lee Brehm
- Children: 2
- Website: www.stephanieyoungvoicetalent.com

Stephanie Young-Brehm (born April 3) is an American voice actress primarily known for her voice-over work in English-language dubs for Japanese anime. Her best-known roles include the Dominator in the Psycho-Pass universe, Nico Robin in the Funimation dub of One Piece, Arachne in Soul Eater, Towa in Dragon Ball Xenoverse 2, Nana Shimura in My Hero Academia, Clare in Claymore, Olivier Armstrong in Fullmetal Alchemist: Brotherhood, Tamayo Kataoka in Rideback, and Sylvia Sherwood in Spy × Family. Young graduated from Baylor University with a degree in theatre performance and was nominated twice for the Dallas Theatre League's Leon Rabin Award. She has also appeared in various TV and film projects, including the Lifetime film and web series Inspector Mom.

== Personal life ==
Young is a singer/songwriter for the Dallas-based jazz band, The Brehms, along with her husband, David Lee Brehm, who is also a songwriter and guitarist.

== Filmography ==
=== Anime series ===
List of voice performances in anime series
Year	Title	Role	Notes	Ref.
2005	SoltyRei	Miranda		
2007	Basilisk	Kagero		
2007	School Rumble	Itoko Osakabe		
2007–present	One Piece	Nico Robin, Nico Olvia	Funimation dub	
2008	Aquarion	Sophia		
2008	Claymore	Clare		
2008	Ouran High School Host Club	Benio "Benibara" Amakusa	Credited as Callie McHalen	
2008	School Rumble: 2nd Semester	Itoko Osakabe		
2009	Big Windup!	Hanai's Mother		
2009	Blassreiter	Sasha		
2010	Oh! Edo Rocket	Oise		
2010	Fullmetal Alchemist: Brotherhood	Olivier Mira Armstrong		
2011	Ga-Rei: Zero	Misuzu Nakabayashi		
2011	Eden of the East	Juiz		
2011	Rideback	Tamayo Kataoka		
2011	Fairy Tail	Karen Lilica, Mother Pisces		
2012	.hack//Quantum	Shamrock		
2012	Okami-san and Her Seven Companions	Momoko		
2012	Shiki	Kanami		
2012	Fractale	Moeran		
2012	A Certain Magical Index	Sherry		
2013	Last Exile: Fam, the Silver Wing	Farahnāz Agusta		
2013	Tenchi War on Geminar	Cordyline		
2014	Psycho-Pass	Dominator		
2014	Hetalia: The Beautiful World	Fem!France		
2015	Blood Blockade Battlefront	K.K.		
2015	The Heroic Legend of Arslan	Queen Tahamenay		
2016	Dimension W	Mary		
2016	Show By Rock!!	Darudayu		
2016	Castle Town Dandelion	Satsuki Sakurada		
2017	Gosick	Ginger Pie		
2017	Restaurant to Another World	Red Queen		
2017	Juni Taisen: Zodiac War	Toshiko (Boar)		
2017	Code: Realize − Guardian of Rebirth	Victoria		
2017	Star Blazers: Space Battleship Yamato 2199	Saori		
2017	Konohana Kitan	Satsuki's Mother		
2018	The Morose Mononokean	Nara Ashiya		
2018	Kakuriyo: Bed and Breakfast for Spirits	Ritsuko		
2018	Zombie Land Saga	Yugiri		
2018	My Hero Academia	Nana Shimura		
2019	B't X Neo	Rosemary		
2019	Kono Oto Tomare! Sounds of Life	Himesaka Advisor		
2021	Sakura Wars the Animation	Anastasia Palma		
2021	Log Horizon: Destruction of the Round Table	Sarariya		
2022	She Professed Herself Pupil of the Wise Man	Narrator		
2022	Spy × Family	Sylvia Sherwood		
2022	Raven of the Inner Palace	Axiu		
2023–present	That Time I Got Reincarnated as a Slime	Blanc / Testarossa		
2024	Shangri-La Frontier	Mana	Season 2	
2025	To Be Hero X	Miss J		
2026	Witch Hat Atelier	Coco's Mother		

=== Film ===
List of voice performances in feature films
Year	Title	Role	Notes	Ref.
2009	Evangelion: 1.0 You Are (Not) Alone	Yui Ikari	Limited theatrical release	
2011	Evangelion: 2.0 You Can (Not) Advance	Yui Ikari	Limited theatrical release	
2016	Psycho-Pass: The Movie	Dominator	Limited theatrical release	
2016	Harmony	Garbriel Edain	Limited theatrical release	
2017	One Piece Film: Gold	Nico Robin	Limited theatrical release	
2019	Human Lost	Madam	Limited theatrical release	
2019	One Piece: Stampede	Nico Robin	Limited theatrical release	
2022	One Piece Film: Red	Nico Robin	Limited theatrical release	
2023	Psycho-Pass Providence	Dominator	Limited theatrical release	

==== Television films, specials and direct-to-video ====
List of voice performances in television films, specials and direct-to-video
Year	Title	Role	Notes	Ref.
2008	School Rumble: Extra Class	Itoko Osakabe	OVA	
2011	Eden of the East the Movie I: King of Eden	Juiz		
2011	Eden of the East the Movie II: Paradise Lost	Juiz, Akane Ato, Akiko Ato, Fumie Ato, Yuko Ato		
2012	King of Thorn	Katherine Turner		
2013	One Piece Film: Strong World	Nico Robin		
2014	One Piece Film: Z	Nico Robin		
2019	One Piece 3D2Y: Overcoming Ace's Death! Luffy's Pledge to His Friends	Nico Robin		
2019	One Piece: Episode of Sabo: The Three Brothers' Bond – The Miraculous Reunion and the Inherited Will	Nico Robin		
2019	One Piece: Adventure of Nebulandia	Nico Robin		
2019	One Piece: Episode of Skypiea	Nico Robin		
2024	Spy × Family Code: White	Sylvia Sherwood		

=== Video games ===
List of voice performances in video games
Year	Title	Role	Notes	Ref.
2005	Spikeout: Battle Street	Fiona		
2005	Unreal Championship 2: The Liandri Conflict	Selket, Devastation		
2009	Case Closed: The Mirapolis Investigation	Utako Chase		
2012	Borderlands 2	Lynchwood Sheriff, Mrs. Meer		
2014	Smite	Nu Wa		
2014	Borderlands: The Pre-Sequel!	Nisha		
2016	Dragon Ball Xenoverse 2	Towa		
2020	Dragon Ball Z: Kakarot	Towa		
