= Yūji Iwahara =

Japanese manga artist

- Born: Memanbetsu, Hokkaido, Japan
- Occupation: Manga artist
- Writing career
- Notable works: King of Thorn; Dimension W

Yūji Iwahara (岩原 裕二, Iwahara Yūji; born in Memanbetsu, Hokkaido, Japan) is a Japanese manga artist. After graduating from art school, he joined Hudson Soft as a graphic artist for video games such as Mega Bomberman and Kishin Dōji Zenki FX: Vajra Fight. He made his manga debut in 1994 in Monthly Afternoon with a story for which he won the fall Afternoon Four Seasons Award, a prize he received three more times over the next two years. He is best known in the West for his work on King of Thorn and Chikyu Misaki, both of which have been licensed in English. He was scheduled to draw Quest, a title in the Marvel Comics imprint Tsunami, with writer Andi Watson but the series was cancelled before any issues were completed.

His other works include the manga adaptation of the videogame Koudelka. Another one of his series, Cat Paradise, which has been serialized in Champion RED since April 2006, is licensed in English. In 2007, he contributed the original character designs to the anime television series, Darker than Black. He is also the artist of Darker than Black: Shikkoku no Hana, a Darker than Black spin-off manga started in 2009. A near-future science fiction manga titled Dimension W has been released in the Young Gangan magazine since September 2011. Dimension W finished in 2019 with the release of its 16th volume. Iwahara's illustration process was featured in the March 2001 issue of Newtype.

== Works ==
- Koudelka (1999)
- Ookami no Dou (2001)
- Chikyu Misaki (2001)
- King of Thorn (2002–2005)
- Wreckage X (2004)
- Cat Paradise (2006–2008)
- Darker than Black: Shikkoku no Hana (2009–2011)
- Dimension W (2011–2019)
- Clevatess (2020–ongoing)
