= Stereopony discography =

- Studio albums: 3
- Compilation albums: 1
- Singles: 12
- Video albums: 4
- Music videos: 13
- Other albums: 6

The discography of Stereopony, an all female Japanese rock band formed in Okinawa, Japan, consists of 3 studio albums, 1 compilation album, 12 singles, 4 video albums, and 13 music videos. After forming the band in 2007, Stereopony's three members Aimi (vocals/guitar), Nohana (bass), and Shiho (drums) performed on Tokyo FM's School of Lock! program, and were soon signed to Sony Music Japan's gr8! Records record label. The trio released their first single "Hitohira no Hanabira" in 2008, followed by their second single "Namida no Mukō" and third single "I Do It", both released in 2009. "Namida no Mukō" is the band's highest charting single on Japanese Oricon singles chart, peaking at No. 2. Stereopony's first three singles were later featured on the band's debut studio album Hydrangea ga Saiteiru (2009), which peaked at No. 7 on Oricon's albums chart.

Stereopony's fifth single "Tsukiakari no Michishirube" (2009) was their second single to reach the top 10 Oricon singles chart, peaking at No. 8. Stereopony's sixth single "Hanbunko" (2010) is a cover originally released by Bivattchee in 2002. Stereopony's fourth through seventh singles were released on the band's second album Over The Border (2010). Stereopony's ninth single "Tatoeba Utaenakunattara" (2011) is a collaboration with fellow Okinawan band Kariyushi58. The band's third and final album More! More!! More!!! (2011) features their eighth through tenth singles. The band released two more singles in 2012 before disbanding.

== Albums ==
=== Studio albums ===
Year	Album details	Peak Oricon chart positions
2009	Hydrangea ga Saiteiru: Released: June 17, 2009; Label: gr8! (SRCL-7046–7047, SRCL-7048); Format: CD, CD+DVD	7
2010	Over The Border: Released: June 9, 2010; Label: Sony (SRCL-7277, SRCL-7279); Format: CD, CD+DVD	12
2011	More! More!! More!!!: Released: December 7, 2011; Label: Sony (SRCL-7801–7802, SRCL-7803–7804, SRCL-7805); Format: CD, CD+DVD	33

=== Compilation album ===
Year	Album details	Peak Oricon chart positions
2012	Best of Stereopony: Released: November 21, 2012; Label: Sony (SRCL-8179); Format: CD, CD+DVD	40

== Singles ==
Year	Song	Peak Oricon chart positions	Album
2008	"Hitohira no Hanabira"	25	Hydrangea ga Saiteiru
2009	"Namida no Mukō"	2	Hydrangea ga Saiteiru
2009	"I Do It"	13	Hydrangea ga Saiteiru
2009	"Smilife"	20	Over The Border
2009	"Tsukiakari no Michishirube"	8	Over The Border
2010	"Hanbunko"	21	Over The Border
2010	"Over Drive"	28	Over The Border
2010	"Chiisana Mahō"	23	More! More!! More!!!
2011	"Tatoeba Utaenakunattara"	52	More! More!! More!!!
2011	"Arigatō"	26	More! More!! More!!!
2012	"Stand By Me"	30	Best of Stereopony
2012	"Namida Nante Mishite Yannnai"	68	None

== Video albums ==
Year	Video details	Peak Oricon chart positions
2009	1st Tour A Hydrangea Blooms 2009: Released: December 16, 2009; Label: gr8! (SRBL-1417); Format: DVD	70
2012	Stereopony to Moushimasu: Miseinen-hen: Released: January 25, 2012; Label: Sony (SRBL-1512); Format: DVD	149
2012	Stereopony to Moushimasu: Seijin-hen: Released: February 1, 2012; Label: Sony (SRBL-1513); Format: DVD	92
2013	Best of Stereopony: Final Live: Released: February 27, 2013; Label: Sony (SRBL-1559); Format: DVD	55

== Music videos ==
Year	Song	Director
2008	"Hitohira no Hanabira"	Shigeaki Kubo
2009	"Namida no Mukō"	Shigeaki Kubo
2009	"I Do It"	Shigeaki Kubo
2009	"Seishun ni, Sono Namida ga Hitsuyō da!"	
2009	"Smilife"	Shigeaki Kubo
2009	"Tsukiakari no Michishirube"	Kensaku Kakimoto
2010	"Hanbunko"	Shigeaki Kubo
2010	"Over Drive"	Takatoshi Tsuchiya
2010	"Chiisana Mahō"	Takahiro Miki; Takatoshi Tsuchiya
2011	"Tatoeba Utaenakunattara"	Takatoshi Tsuchiya
2011	"Arigatō"	Takatoshi Tsuchiya
2012	"Stand By Me"	Nobu Suekichi
2012	"Ōkami"	Nobu Suekichi
2012	"Namida Nante Mishite Yannnai"	

== Other album appearances ==
Year	Song(s)	Album	Notes	Ref.
2009	"Namida no Mukō"	Mobile Suit Gundam 00 Original Soundtrack 04	Soundtrack to the anime television series Mobile Suit Gundam 00.	
2009	"Namida no Mukō"	Mobile Suit Gundam 00 Complete Best	Theme song collection to the anime television series Mobile Suit Gundam 00.	
2009	"Tsukiakari no Michishirube"	Darker than Black: Ryūsei no Gemini Original Soundtrack	Soundtrack to the anime television series Darker than Black: Ryūsei no Gemini.	
2010	"Namida no Mukō"	Gundam 30th Anniversary Box: Gundam Songs 145	CD box set of theme songs used in the Gundam series.	
2011	"Akashi"	Zone Tribute: Kimi ga Kureta Mono	Tribute album for the band Zone. "Akashi" is a cover of Zone's 2002 single.	
2012	"Again"	She Loves You	Tribute album for Yui. "Again" is a cover of Yui's 2009 single.	
