= Best the Back Horn =

Best The Back Horn

Greatest hits album by The Back Horn
- Released: January 23, 2008
- Genre: Alternative rock
- Label: Victor Entertainment; Speedstar Records

The Back Horn chronology
The Back Horn (2007)	Best The Back Horn (2008)	Pulse (2008)

Best the Back Horn is a compilation album release of the Japanese rock band, The Back Horn. The album was released on January 23, 2008 to celebrate the 10th anniversary of the band. It peaked at number 10 on Oricon Albums Chart.

== Track list ==
Disc 1

1. Sunny (サニー) – 3:55
  First major single.
2. Namida ga Koboretara (涙がこぼれたら) – 4:44
  Fourth major single.
3. Hikari no Kesshou (光の結晶) – 5:22
  Sixth major single.
4. Mirai (未来) – 5:18
  Fifth major single and theme song to the movie Akarui Mirai.
5. KIZUNA Song (キズナソング) – 6:02
  Tenth major single.
6. Ikusen Kounen no Kodoku (幾千光年の孤独) – 4:21
  Song from the first major album Ningen Program.
7. Seimeisen (生命線) – 4:33
  Seventh major single.
8. Hitorigoto (ひとり言＜New Mix＞) – 4:34
  Song from the indie album Yomigaeru Hi.
9. Utsukushii Namae (美しい名前) – 5:26
  Fifteenth major single.
10. Hajimete no Kokyuu de (初めての呼吸で) – 5:16
  Twelfth major single.
11. Chaos Diver (カオスダイバー) – 4:53
  Thirteenth major single.
12. Kiseki (奇跡) – 5:28
  Song from the fourth major album Headphone Children and theme song to the Japanese horror movie Zoo.

Disc 2

1. Requiem (レクイエム) – 5:20
  Eighth major single B-side and theme song to the movie Casshern.
2. Cobalt Blue (コバルトブルー) – 4:26
  Ninth major single.
3. Black Hole Birthday (ブラックホールバースデイ) – 5:07
  Eleventh major single.
4. Natsukusa no Yureru Oka (夏草の揺れる丘) – 4:56
  Song from the second major album Shinzou Orchestra.
5. Yume no Hana (夢の花) – 4:38
  Eighth major single.
6. Sora, Hoshi, Umi no Yoru (空、星、海の夜) – 5:38
  Second major single.
7. Maihime (舞姫) – 4:46
  Song from the sixth major album The Back Horn.
8. Wana (罠) – 4:22
  Sixteenth major single and the first ending theme to the anime series Mobile Suit Gundam 00.
9. Sekaiju no Shita de (世界樹の下で) – 5:02
  Third major single.
10. Fuusen (風船) – 4:52
  Indie single.
11. Fuyu no Milk (冬のミルク＜New Recording＞) – 4:46
  Song from the indie mini-album Doko e Yuku.
12. Koe (声) – 4:21
  Fourteenth major single.
13. Yaiba (刃) – 3:29
  Theme song to the movie Sakigake!! Otokojuku.

== Personnel ==
- Yamada Masashi - vocals
- Suganami Eijun - guitar
- Okamine Koushu - bass
- Matsuda Shinji - drums
