= Music of Darker than Black =

The action anime Darker than Black features music composed by Yoko Kanno who created one soundtrack. Kanno was approached by director Tensai Okamura in regards to ideas about detective stories-like scenario to fit the atmosphere. For the sequel, Darker than Black: Gemini of the Meteor, Kanno was replaced by Yasushi Ishii who described his music as a battlefield.

The music was collected in multiple soundtracks while the opening and ending themes have been popular.

== Creation ==
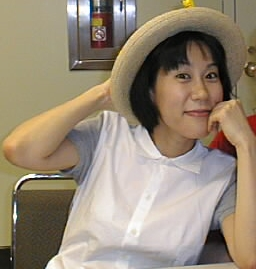
Yoko Kanno composed the score of the first Darker than Black series.

The series' soundtrack was composed by Yoko Kanno in 2007. When approached by Okamura, Kanno recalled being given ideas about a detective series to give her music a distinctive style. When she began composing the soundtrack, she did not have a scenario or setting in mind when she met Okamura again. Some of the background music is typical Kanno as heard in Ghost in the Shell: Stand Alone Complex, but other tracks are livelier; she wanted to write glamorous songs. Kanno cited sophisticated French films as inspiring the music of Darker than Black, wanting it to embody the series' cold characters; Latin music was another influence, and she appreciated sound director Kazuhiro Wakabayashi's assistance with the soundtrack.

The soundtrack for Gemini of the Meteor was released in Japan on December 23, 2009, by Aniplex. Its twenty tracks include short versions of the opening and closing themes. Yasushi Ishii replaced Kanno in the sequel and OVAs, and came to regard Darker than Black and Hellsing as his favorite works. Ishii described the second season is like the darkest time of night right before dawn. For him, the second scenario can be summed up as a harsh battlefield. He used to make hard rock, electric and experimental music in the making of the soundtrack.

Two pieces of theme music are used: one opening theme and one ending theme. The opening theme "Tsukiakari no Michishirube" (ツキアカリのミチシルベ; lit. 'Guidepost of the Moonlight') is sung by the Japanese rock band Stereopony who claims the theme is meant to show anxiety and despair in a daily life. The ending theme "From Dusk Till Dawn" is performed by Abingdon Boys School, who previously did the first opening theme for Darker than Black. The vocalist Takanori Nishikawa stated the ending's purpose was to express multiple affection in a limited time. "From Dusk Till Dawn" sold 22,923 copies in Japan.

The OVAs use "Darker than Black" by Ishii as the ending theme. The theme was noted for its similarities with David Bowie's theme song "Ziggy Stardust". Although Ishii admitted he was heavily influenced by Bowie's works, he claimed the similarities were accidentally. According to Isshi, the song primarily focuses on Hei. This incarnation of the character is that of a man who fights as a savior, how to deceive salvation in a world without salvation. Hei is further characterizated as a man in a world of struggle, mercy, and overcoming oneself. Despite having such powers, Ishii wanted to write Hei as a man suffering from loneliness. In contrast to the audio of Gemini of the Meteor, Gaiden has soundtrack by piano and string instruments.

== Soundtracks ==
The series' soundtrack was composed by Yoko Kanno in 2007. The series uses four pieces of theme music: two opening themes and two ending themes. "Howling" by Abingdon Boys School was used as the opening theme for the first 14 episodes while "Kakusei Heroism (The Hero Without a "Name")" by An Cafe was used as the second opening theme from episodes 15 onwards. "Tsukiakari" (ツキアカリ; lit. 'Moonlight') by Rie fu was used as the ending theme for the first 14 episodes while "Dreams" by High and Mighty Color was used as the second ending theme from episodes 15 onwards.

The soundtrack has 20 tracks, including the opening and closing themes performed by Abingdon Boys School and Rie fu. Other non-instrumental songs were written by Tim Jensen and performed by Mai Yamane (tracks eight and 10) and James Wendt (tracks 14 and 19). It peaked at number 57 on the Oricon albums chart. Tensai Okamura wanted 1970s-type folk music which would convey the impression of darkness.

Soundtrack
No.	Title	Length
1.	"Go Dark"	3:14
2.	"HOWLING — TV size ver."	1:29
3.	""High-Heel Runaway" (ハイヒールラナウェイ, Hai Hīru Ranawei)"	3:28
4.	"Tenderly"	2:19
5.	"Sid (シド, Shido)"	2:04
6.	"Was"	4:08
7.	"Outside"	2:36
8.	"No One's Home"	2:43
9.	"Guy"	2:02
10.	"ScatCat"	2:02
11.	""Contractor" (ケイヤクシャ, Keiyakusha)"	3:34
12.	"Shadow"	2:45
13.	"Black (クロ, Kuro)"	3:38
14.	"Deadly Work"	3:36
15.	""Stargazing" (テンタイカンソク, Tentai Kansoku)"	0:45
16.	"BlueCat"	3:08
17.	""Moonlight" (ツキアカリ-TV size ver., Tsukiakari TV size ver.)"	1:32
18.	"Water Forest"	2:11
19.	"Blend in"	3:14
20.	"Yin's Piano (インのピアノ, In no Piano)"	3:11

=== Soundtrack 2 ===
Soundtrack
No.	Title	Length
1.	"Dive into the 9"
2.	"Moken Cerberus"
3.	"Galaxy Train"
4.	"No. 23"
5.	"Soul Fusion"
6.	"Jesus"
7.	"Karuraen"
8.	"Suizen Reika Komusou"
9.	"Psychic Contact"
10.	"Inazuma Flash Tanka"
11.	"Gekko Bosatsu No Namida"
12.	"Brand New Happiness"
13.	"Fire – Are Ippon Kaji No Moto –"
14.	"Warau Kongo Doji"
15.	"Anguria Sofia"
16.	"Yahweh no Mori"
17.	"Nyogen Midnight Town"
18.	"Jakumetsu No Serenade"
19.	"TSUKIAKARI NO MICHISHIRUBE – OPENING EDITION –"
20.	"FROM DUSK TILL DAWN ANIME EDIT / ABINGDON BOYS SCHOOL"

=== Extra soundtrack ===
Darker than Black -Ryuusei no Gemini- Extra Soundtrack
No.	Title	Length
1.	"Crystal Roses"
2.	"Morning Dew"
3.	"Light Cooking"
4.	"Ark"
5.	"Saddle Jam"
6.	"Acid Razz"
7.	"Deserted Bar"
8.	"Detective Funk"
9.	"Funny Trial"
10.	"Disillusion"
11.	"Skull Hazard"
12.	"Jewelry Box"
13.	"Bad J Trip"
14.	"Extreme"
15.	"Black Magic Ceremony"
16.	"Miserable Hopeless"
17.	"Dark Grass"
18.	"Jesus Cloud ~Instrumental Version~"
19.	"Autumn Leaves Falling"
20.	"Hollow Senation"
21.	"Belly Shake"
22.	"Fortuna"
23.	"Baldo Sadou"
24.	"Magic"
25.	"Electronic Dragon"
26.	"Leaf of Csardas"
27.	"Sou Love A Dark Dream"
28.	"Gemein Shadow"
29.	"The National Flower's Mist"
30.	"Furusato's Theme"
31.	"Movin' Higher"
32.	"DARKER THAN BLACK ~ "Can you fly""
33.	"Creating New Land"

== Singles ==
=== Howling ===
"Howling" is the first opening theme by Abingdon Boys School. The lyrics focused on Hei's characterization with Okamura commenting that parts of it delve into elements the character briefly saw.

=== Tsukiakari ===
"Tsukiakari" by Rie Fu is the first ending theme of Darker than Black.

=== Kakusei Heroism ===
"Kakusei Heroism ~The Hero Without a "Name"~" (覚醒ヒロイズム～THE HERO WITHOUT A "NAME"～, Kakusei Hiroizumu ~THE HERO WITHOUT A "NAME"~) is the twelfth single by band An Cafe. The single is available in three types, two including different bonus DVDs, and one with a bonus live track. The title track is the second opening theme Darker than Black. "Kakusei Heroism" marks the debut of guitarist Takuya and keyboardist Yuuki after the departure of Bou. The song peaked at No. 13 on the Japanese singles chart and is their biggest selling single.

=== Dreams ===
"Dreams" is the first single from the band since January 2007 by High and Mighty Color. It is used as the second ending theme for Darker than Black and has been described as a ballad and about the sadness of breaking up. The first pressing of the single came with four exclusive character stickers from Darker than Black. The single is unlike any other single in the fact that rather than crediting "High and Mighty Color" for writing the lyrics and composing the music from Roxy production, "Dreams" gives the specifics for who wrote the lyrics on some of the songs. The single charted the 18th place on Oricon during its first day and would go on to obtain the 24th spot on the weekly charts.

=== Tsukiakari no Michishirube ===
"Tsukiakari no Michishirube" (ツキアカリのミチシルベ) is the fifth single by the Japanese rock group Stereopony under label of gr8! Records on November 4, 2009. The single's main track "Tsukiakari no Michishirube" is the opening theme for the anime series Darker than Black: Gemini of the Meteor. Stereopony who claims the theme is meant to show anxiety and despair in a daily life.

=== From Dusk Till Dawn ===
The ending theme "From Dusk Till Dawn" is performed by Abingdon Boys School, who previously did the first opening theme for Darker than Black. The vocalist Takanori Nishikawa stated the ending's purpose was to express multiple affection in a limited time. "From Dusk Till Dawn" sold 22,923 copies in Japan.

== Reception ==
The second season's opening theme, "Kakusei Heroism" by An Cafe, was praised; "Dreams" by High and Mighty Color was said to lack "Tsukiaraki"'s appeal as a closing theme. Koinya preferred "Kakusei Heroism ~The Hero Without A Name~" over "Howling" despite enjoying both themes. Yoko Kanno's score was described as "unintrusive" by Ain't It Cool News for the variety of instruments used for background music while Anime News Network commented it "achieve[d] a sort of synergy, pouring their considerable skills into a sequence of silent beauty and power".

Yasushi Ishii's score in the sequel was praised alongside the ending of Abingdon Boys School song, "From Dusk Till Dawn". On the other hand, DVD Talk found Ishii's score inferior to Yoko Kanno's from the first series. In an Anime News Network poll, "Tsukiakari no Michishirube" was one of 2009's best openings, which Active Anime agreed as enjoyable opening. However, Active Anime felt Kanno's score to be superior to Isshi. Anime UK News still enjoyed the soundtrack as well as the ending theme "From Dusk Till Dawn".
