= List of Tegami Bachi episodes =

The cover of the first Japanese DVD volume release by Bandai Visual on January 27, 2010, in Japan.

The episodes of the Tegami Bachi anime are an adaptation of the manga series by creator Hiroyuki Asada, currently serialized on the Japanese monthly Jump Square magazine. The story is about a boy named Lag Seeing, who is a "Letter Bee", a delivery boy at the "Bee Hive" which fulfills everyone's delivery requests. Lag's "Dingo", or personal bodyguard, keeps him out of danger from the Gaichuu, giant insects that roam the darkness and attacks anyone near them. The series explores Lag's adventures as he helps deliver packages for the inhabitants of AmberGround. The animation was handled by Pierrot+, while the cast that voiced some of the characters featured in the Tegami Bachi special Tegami Bachi: Hikari to Ao no Gensō Yawa (テガミバチ 〜光と青の幻想夜話〜, Letter Bee: Light and Blue Night Fantasy) returned for the anime.

The series premiered on TV Tokyo, TV Osaka, TV Aichi, and their affiliated stations on October 3, 2009. A total of seven DVDs were released in January 2010 by Bandai Visual. The episodes have four pieces of theme music, two opening themes and two ending themes. The first opening theme "Hajimari no Hi" (はじまりの日; lit. 'Day of Beginnings') is sung by Shikao Suga featuring Japanese hip-hop DJ Mummy-D, which appears in the first 13 episodes, while "Love Letter no Kawari ni Konoshi o" (ラブレターのかわりにこの詩を。; lit. 'This Poem In Place of the Love Letter') is sung by Seira, which serves as the second opening theme for episodes 14 onwards. The first ending theme "Hatenaki Michi" (果てなき道; lit. 'Endless Road') is sung by Himeka, which appear in the first 13 episodes, while "Hikari no Kioku" (光の記憶; lit. 'Memories of the Light') is sung by Japanese rock band Angelo, which serves as the second ending theme from episode 14 onwards.

== Season 1 ==
No.	Title	Original release date	English air date
Sp.	"Light and Blue Night Fantasy"; Transliteration: "Hikari to Ao no Gensō Yawa" (Japanese: 光と青の幻想夜話)	2008	-
Lag Seeing finishes a delivery and returns to the bee hive to receive his next assignment. The chief explains that it's a small package for Elena Blanc, who once worked as a bee, and a letter to Wald Blanc, her younger brother in Yodaka. The letter is from Largo Lloyd, the chief. Miss Aria tells Lag that there will be a guide around Lake Olympia known as Darwin. He finds out that Darwin is a veteran. Lag Seeing and the others follow Darwin to Bifrost. When Miss Aria and the chief are in a conversation, Miss Aria ask the chief why he hid from Lag that Darwin was Elena Blanc's Dingo when she's on duty and the real package to Elena is Darwin. Darwin fainted in the journey to Giorgo. Lag sent him to a man's house. When Lag looked at Gauche Suede's shindanju, he started thinking about the past with Gauche Suede. The man called Lag to be careful of the Dacquiose Cliff, because Elena Blanc was killed by a Gaichuu 10 years ago there. Lag decided to leave Darwin there because he's still weak. But Darwin was awake and forced himself to go with them when he heard about Elena Blanc. At the Dacquoise Cliff near Silencio, Niche finds no path because there was a landslide. Gaichuu Absinthe attacks, and when Lag shoots a Shindan, he sees Darwin's heart. Elena had gone for a delivery and left Darwin at the Olympia Lake because he was hurt, and called him to wait for her but she died. Largo Lloyd (when the chief was young and still only a bee) told Darwin not to wait, but Darwin didn't care about his word and kept on waiting. After Lag followed Darwin who passed through the cave to Silencio, he saw Elena's grave. Darwin laid beside Elena's grave and died. Lag saw Elena's heart. Largo Lloyd and Elena were good friends before she died, and she asked about his charm because it's nice. He told her that it's a rare item and there are another matching pair and now the chief found the matching pair and delivered to Elena. Lag sent the small package (a pair of pendants) and the letter to Wald Blanc, Elena's brother. And after that Wald Blanc made a grave for Darwin beside Elena's grave and placed the charms on both of the graves of Elena and Darwin.
1	"Letter and Letter Bee"; Transliteration: "Tegami to Tegamibachi" (Japanese: テガミとテガミバチ)	October 3, 2009	December 16, 2011
The story begins with 18-year-old Gauche Suede, a Letter Bee, arriving to pick up his latest package. However, he was surprised to find his letter to be a little boy named Lag Seeing. Lag has just lost his mother, who has been taken to Akatsuki, AmberGround's capital, and the boy is to be delivered to his aunt's residence in Campbell Litus. Along the way, the Letter Bee tells the boy briefly about his job and the Gaichuu he has to repel. After a mishap regarding Lag unwittingly firing Gauche's weapon, the Shindanjuu, Gauche takes the boy to a cave to rest for the night. After Lag has recurring dreams regarding Gauche's lifestyle and his sister Sylvette, the boy wakes up to discover Gauche and his Dingo Roda lying exhausted from a fight with numerous Gaichuu.
2	"My Friends"; Transliteration: "Boku no Tomodachi" (Japanese: ぼくの友達)	October 10, 2009	December 19, 2011
Lag, Gauche and Roda continue their journey. Lag starts to warm up to Gauche and Roda, but he is still intent on finding his mother and asks Gauche to bring him along to Akatsuki if he becomes Head Bee. However Gauche sticks to his duty as Letter Bee and does not want to have any connections with the boy. Lag becomes upset and steals Gauche's Shindanjuu while he's asleep to head for the capital, but is lost and falls into a sand trap by a Gaichuu Bucker. Gauche arrives in time to save Lag and shoots the Gaichuu, but he misses as it's too far. They prepare for another shot and Lag reveals a spirit amber in his left eye, which strengthens the Shindanjuu and destroy the Gaichuu. Later, Lag carries an injured Gauche all the way to town. Three days passed and Gauche has trouble getting supplies as the townspeople are wary of outsiders. Lag brings food and water before they leave. Lag and Gauche have a touching moment as Gauche finally treats him as a friend. As Lag bids farewell to Gauche, he shouts that he will be a Letter Bee like him someday. Five years later, Lag prepares to embark on his promise to be a Letter Bee.
3	"Crybaby Boy, Letter Girl"; Transliteration: "Nakimushi Shōnen, Tegami Shōjo" (Japanese: 泣き虫少年、テガミ少女)	October 17, 2009	December 20, 2011
During the five years, Lag lives with his aunt Sabrina, while studying hard to be a Letter Bee. Eventually he passes the preliminary exams and is granted an interview at the Yuusari region. After bidding goodbye to his aunt and the townspeople, Lag takes off with Connor, a regular Letter Bee at Campbell Litus, to the train station to head for Yuusari. Lag stumbles onto a little girl sitting inside a niche in the station and notices her mailing label, however the delivery details are unclear. Lag decides to part ways with Connor and deliver the girl to her destination himself before heading for the interview. When Lag tries to get her name, the girl tells him that she has many aliases. Lag decides to name her Niche from their first encounter, which she accepts.
4	"Lag's Dingo"; Transliteration: "Ragu no Dingo" (Japanese: ラグのディンゴ)	October 24, 2009	December 21, 2011
Lag and Niche reach the town they were looking for and find the address Niche is delivered to, a freak circus named "Love Someone Down". They discover that the animals used to perform in the circus have been mistreated. Niche is handed over to the circus ringleader and she bids farewell to Lag. Before leaving for Yuusari, Lag forgets to have the receiver sign the delivery receipt and heads back. After obtaining information on the circus's newest exhibit, which is actually Niche, Lag rushes back just in time to see Niche destroying the circus and releasing all the animals. He goes after her into Broccoli Forest, which is Gaichuu territory. Lag finds Niche with a Gaichuu, but she handles herself easily and cuts the creature's head off. The Gaichuu continues its attack and injures Niche. This causes Lag to fire a Shindan into the Gaichuu, destroying it, while Niche sees Lag's memories. Niche decides to become Lag's Dingo, while an escaped animal from the circus, whom she calls Steak, goes with them.
5	"Dead End Town"; Transliteration: "Ikidomari no Machi" (Japanese: 行き止まりの町)	October 31, 2009	December 22, 2011
Lag and Niche arrive in the town of Kyrie, where it is the place that crosses over to Yuusari, and also a dead end town where few travelers visit. They meet a girl named Neri, who gets interested in them and offers to take them to the town's only inn. However, after checking in, Lag realizes that Neri has made off with his bag, intending to use his crossing pass to go to Yuusari. She attacks Lag and tells him that the reason for stealing his pass is to send a letter to a Letter Bee named Jiggy Pepper, whom she hates for abandoning her and her brother Nero, who died in his absence. After alerting the townspeople's attention, they attack Neri and take the pass for themselves. Niche arrives in the nick of time and defeat the townspeople, but Neri recovers and snatches the pass, running all the way to the bridge to Yuusari, while Lag and Niche go after her. A mysterious man named Largo Lloyd becomes interested in Lag and Niche.
6	"Letter to Jiggy Pepper"; Transliteration: "Jigī Peppā e no Tegami" (Japanese: ジギー・ペッパーへの手紙)	November 7, 2009	December 23, 2011
Neri tries to cross the bridge to Bifrost but realizes the bridge is not there. Signal, the gatekeeper of the bridge, identifies her as a trespasser attempting to bluff her way in and summons a frog-like creature to dispose of her. Niche arrives to pin down the monster, while Lag risks his life to grab Neri's letter. He shoots a Shindan from his hand and obtains the letter, in the process revealing the heart of Nero. Neri witnesses Nero convincing Jiggy to go pursue his dreams and he promises to become stronger in order to protect his sister someday. The letter was meant for Nero to apologize to Jiggy for his unfulfilled promise, and asks Jiggy to take care of Neri. Largo Lloyd appears and explains his theory of Lag's ability with his spirit amber: to peer into one's heart. Using this information, Lag fires a Shindan at the church bell, revealing to Neri that Jiggy funded the building of the church in town in order to instill hope for his siblings and the townspeople. Her faith in Letter Bees restored, Neri decides to mail the letter to Jiggy herself, and bids goodbye to Lag's group.
7	"Yuusari Central, 13 Nocturne Way, Head Post Office Beehive"; Transliteration: "Yūsari Sentoraru, Yasōmichi Jūsanbanchi, Yūbinkan BEE-HIVE" (Japanese: ユウサリ中央 夜想道13番地 郵便館BEE-HIVE)	November 14, 2009	December 26, 2011
Lag's group are allowed to pass over the bridge to Bifrost, and reunites with Connor, who has been waiting for them. He rides them to Central Yuusari, where Lag will take his exams in the Head Post Office. The sub-master, Aria Rink, whom Lag recognizes in Gauche's thoughts, brings him to see the master, who turns out to be Largo Lloyd. Lag is directed to do his suitability interview exam with another initiate, McCay G. They are to deliver letters to a town by going through a path where Gaichuu are frequently encountered. McCay gets there first and encounters a centipede Gaichuu, Glen Keith, but he has no prior experience with Gaichuu and firing the Shindanjuu. Lag's group arrives and defeats the Gaichuu successfully with team coordination, however Lag ends up dirtying the letter. Zazie, the exam proctor, arrives to evaluate their performance. Using Lag's Shindan on McCay's letter, it is revealed that McCay forged it when his was dirtied. McCay fails the exam while Lag is given Zazie's approval. Lag is surprised to learn from Zazie that Gauche is no longer a Letter Bee.
8	"Meeting with Sylvette Suede"; Transliteration: "Shirubetto Suēdo ni Au" (Japanese: シルベット・スエードに会う)	November 21, 2009	December 27, 2011
Lag is upset to learn that Gauche had a breakdown due to the stress of work, according to Zazie. Connor rides Lag to Sylvette Suede's house, where he has an awkward encounter with the girl when Sylvette mistakes Lag for a debt collector. Upon seeing Gauche's Shindanjuu with Sylvette, Lag initially thinks he is here but Sylvette tells him that her brother never came back home after he was continually absent from his duties in Akatsuki and later fired from his work. She remembers that day Aria personally sent his termination notice to inform her. Sylvette has decided to think her brother was dead, and tells Lag to never come back to her place. Later, when heading back, Lag asks Niche what she would do if he lost his heart, and Niche answers that she will do whatever it takes to drag him back, and she will never forget about him. Lag rushes back to Sylvette's place, promising to search for Gauche and restore Sylvette's hopes.
9	"The Crybaby Boy's Vow"; Transliteration: "Nakimushi Shōnen no Chikai" (Japanese: 泣き虫少年の誓い)	November 28, 2009	December 28, 2011
Lag heads back to Sylvette's house, where his spirit amber begins to glow. Touching Gauche's Shindanjuu, both Lag and Sylvette witness flashbacks of Gauche. He insisted on working more deliveries despite the risk of losing his heart for the sake of curing Sylvette's disability. The last memory of Gauche was the time before he headed for the capital and his first encounters with the group called Reverse. Lag promises to find Gauche and bring him back to Sylvette. Sylvette hands Lag Gauche's Shindanjuu for him to use, per her brother's wishes. Back at the Beehive, Largo evaluates Lag's performance and makes him a full-fledged Letter Bee. However, Lag explains his dream is not to become just a Bee; he wants to become Head Bee someday, where no delivery of letters is impossible.
10	"Beneath The Light"; Transliteration: "Hikari no Shita" (Japanese: 光の下)	December 5, 2009	December 29, 2011
Sylvette allows Lag to live in Gauche's room for rent. Aria arrives at Sylvette's house to take Lag out to ask about his background. Aria brings Lag and Niche to the Hill of Prayer, where the artificial sun at Akatsuki shines very brightly on there. She tells Lag about the Day of Flicker, when a government airship which was used to make adjustments to the sun crashed into the vicinity. Before the crash, the light from the sun went out briefly and flickered back on. This caused Gauche to lose part of his heart and forget about his mother, who just died from giving birth to Sylvette. He began to focus all his thoughts to taking care of his sister. Lag tells Aria that he was born on the Day of Flicker just like Sylvette. He and Niche leave Aria and go to help Zazie and Connor repel multiple Gaichuu attacks. After the battle, all three Letter Bees sit down for lunch and drink Sylvette's soup, which causes them to know how horrible the taste is.
11	"Letter of Lies"; Transliteration: "Uso Tegami" (Japanese: 嘘テガミ)	December 12, 2009	December 30, 2011
Lag and Niche begin their first delivery. On their way, they meet a fellow Bee named Moc Sullivan, who thinks that Lag is not fit for the job. He feels there's no need to concern themselves with the content inside the letters, all they do is just deliver them. Lag and Niche arrive at the sender's house, a down-and-out writer named Vincent Alcott. He writes fictional events of his day-to-day life in his letter to his mother. Lag objects this kind of behaviour but can't do anything about it. Crossing a perilous bridge to deliver the letter, Lag, Niche and an old woman encounter a Gaichuu which attempts to destroy the bridge. After Lag and Niche defeat it, the shindan hits the letter, revealing Vincent's memories to the woman Louise, who really is his mother. However, Louise knows that her son writes these kind of letters to her, and hopes that he will one day make his dreams a reality and come back home with pride. On their way back, Niche shows Lag a letter hidden inside one of Vincent's books that Steak ate. Realizing this is the letter that contain Vincent's true feelings, Lag decides to return it to its owner.
12	"The Red and Green Ribbon"; Transliteration: "Aka to Midori no Ribon" (Japanese: 赤と緑のリボン)	December 19, 2009	January 2, 2012
This anime-exclusive episode involves "Sei-naru Yoru" (Holy Night), a Christmas-like holiday originating from the northern areas of AmberGround. Lag and Zazie, become "Holy Night Messengers", who dress in Santa Claus-like costumes, and whose job is "grant wishes" to those they deliver letters to. Lag and Zazie meet Sonja, a girl whose parents were killed by Gaichuu. Because of this, the other villagers fear her, thinking that she might attract other Gaichuu to her village. When a Gaichuu does attack, Zazie determines that it was because of all the presents for Holy Night. Before they return to the village, Sonja gives Lag and Zazie her red and green hair ribbons to remember her by. Zazie then gives his ribbon to a cat he had discovered earlier.
13	"The Promised Land"; Transliteration: "Yakusoku no Daichi" (Japanese: 約束の大地)	December 26, 2009	January 3, 2012
A man named Promessa Prometas returns to withdraw the delivery of his letter. A rich man named Galador constantly pursues a woman named Pistis for her hand in marriage, but his real motives is to take her land and rights. Lag and Niche encounter Galador after he is rejected once again by Pistis. Upon learning the letter is from Promessa to Pistis, Galador and his servant treats Lag and Niche to a dinner. Later, Galador is gone, while Promessa catches up to Lag. He explains that he doesn't want the letter to be delivered to his fiancée, Pistis. He made a promise to marry her once his dream to be a scholar has been fulfilled, however he was afraid that she won't accept him since five years have already passed. Lag finds the letter missing, stolen by Galador while he was asleep. Meanwhile, Galador threatens to destroy Promessa's letter if Pistis doesn't hand over her land rights to him. Lag, Niche and Promessa arrive to take back the letter, but the contents inside are spilled out over the field, creating a rapidly grown bed of flowers. Promessa explains that he bred these flowers to fulfill part of the promise with Pistis and asks her hand in marriage, which she accepts.
14	"The Corpse Doctor"; Transliteration: "Shigai Hakase" (Japanese: 死骸博士)	January 9, 2010	January 4, 2012
Dr. Thunderland Jr, a biologist in the Third Bioscience Division as well as the head doctor in the Bee Hive, has a morbid interest in collecting and dissecting animal corpses, earning him the nickname of "Corpse Doctor". Exhausted from firing too many shindans, Lag returns to the post office and meets up with Connor and Zazie. Dr Thunderland recognizes Steak as a rare Kapellmeister, a creature that is able to form a symbiotic relationship with the spirit insects. He kidnaps Steak for "dissection", while Lag and the others chase after him. After the doctor is cornered at the front door of his lab, Zazie attempts to attack him for having taken the stray cats he befriended for his experiments. Lag knocks the cage holding Steak open and all of them witness Thunderland's flashbacks. It turns out that he is actually a kind doctor who comes up with cures from the corpses he collects. He took the stray cats in as there was a disease spreading around the neighborhood. Aria takes Lag to the lobby where she plays her violin to all the gathered staff, healing their spirits with her Heart Restoration shindan. Thunderland comments to Lag that Gauche Suede was one person who understood him, and wishes him luck in finding the missing man.
15	"Escape of Love"; Transliteration: "Ai no Tōhikō" (Japanese: 愛の逃避行)	January 16, 2010	January 5, 2012
While traveling in a carriage, a couple named Moss and Bonnie strike up conversation with Lag. A gang of cowboys chase after the carriage. Lag is told by Bonnie that Frank, the leader of the gang, was madly in love with her and wanted to marry her, but she refused as she's in love with Moss. Niche helps the couple by beating up Frank and his gang, allowing the carriage to escape, but later falls into an ambush, sending Lag and the couple flying out of the carriage. Frank and his gang arrive and demands the spirit ambers that Bonnie and Moss stole. Revealing themselves to be black market spirit amber miners, Frank tells Lag that the couple are thieves and Bonnie is a con-woman, shocking Moss. However, Bonnie claims that she wanted the ambers so that she can start a new life with Moss. Niche returns to rescue Lag and the couple when Frank is about to execute Moss. With the spirit ambers in their hands, Moss and Bonnie wants to sell them in order to get funds to enter Akatsuki, but Lag has never heard of such a way. He snatches away the spirit ambers and tells the couple that it's wrong to steal things in order to attain happiness. His spirit amber reacts with Bonnie's gun and all witness her flashbacks, showing her to be cheating Moss of his love for her in order to meet up with her real lover in Akatsuki. Moss is angry and wants to kill her, but stops himself. Bonnie tries to kill Lag for ruining her plan but Niche stops her, causing her to run away. Moss thanks Lag for letting him know the truth than living out a lie, as he leaves with a broken heart.
16	"Fan Letter to the Musician"; Transliteration: "Ongakuka e no Fan Retā" (Japanese: 音楽家へのファンレター)	January 23, 2010	January 6, 2012
Lag is sent on a delivery request by Joey, the president of a cotton mill. The letter the president wants delivered is a fan letter to a famous pianist named Matilda Rein. Lag sends the letter to Matilda, who happily reads its contents. It turns out that she is motivated by the encouragements of this particular fan named Joey, who writes poems that vitalize her spirits. Matilda and Joey send letters to each other, culminating in a planned meeting. After asking Lag and Niche to accompany her to meet Joey, she tells of how she met her manager Belushi and their unstable relationship. After some time has passed since Matilda's meeting with Joey, Lag bumps into Belushi outside the Bee Hive and notices that the handwriting on one of the fan letters he dropped looks the same as Joey's. Belushi explains that he and Joey are childhood friends and Joey fell in love with Matilda at first sight, so he helped him write letters of encouragement to her. As Joey and Matilda are going out, he feels best not to tell Matilda the truth about the letters. Later, Belushi tells Matilda that he's quitting as her manager and will be leaving the city and sends her latest music record to her. Lag fires a shindan at the record and it reveals the truth to Matilda. Outside, they run into Belushi who has decided to come back. Matilda tells Belushi not to leave her, and they both go off together. Joey appears and tells Lag and Niche that he planned for Belushi to write the fan letters as that was the only way to push his old friend into admitting his feelings for Matilda.
17	"Letter Bee and Dingo"; Transliteration: "Tegami Bachi to Dingo" (Japanese: テガミバチとディンゴ)	January 30, 2010	January 9, 2012
This episode is a remake of the special, which in turn adapts a "special chapter" from the manga. Lag Seeing just finish a delivery and went back to the bee hive, to receive the next assignment that it's a personal delivery. The chief explain that it's a small package, to Elena Blanc, who once worked as a bee, and a letter to Wald Blanc, her younger brother in Yodaka. The letter is from Largo Lloyd, the chief. Miss Aria tells Lag Seeing that there will be a guide around Lake Olympia known as Darwin. Lag Seeing asks for Darwin everywhere, and all he manages to find out is that Darwin is a veteran. Lag Seeing and others follow Darwin to Bifrost. When Miss Aria and the chief are in a conversation, Miss Aria ask the chief why he hide from Lag that Darwin was Elena Blanc's Dingo when she's on duty and the real package to Elena is Darwin. Darwin fainted in the journey to Giorgo. Lag send him to man's house. The man told Lag to be careful of the Dacquiose Cliff, because Elena Blanc was killed by a Gaichuu 10 years ago there. Lag decided to left Darwin there because he's still weak. But Darwin was awake and force himself to go with them when he heard about Elena Blanc. At the Dacquoise Cliff near Silencio, Niche finds no path because there's a landslide. Gaichuu Absinthe attacks, and when Lag shoots a Shindan, he sees Darwin's heart. Elena had gone for a delivery and left Darwin at the Olympia Lake because he was hurt, and called him to wait for her but she died. Largo Lloyd (when the chief was young and still only a bee) told Darwin not to wait, but Darwin didn't care about his word and kept on waiting. After Lag followed Darwin pass through the cave to Silencio, he saw Elena's grave. Darwin lay beside Elena's grave and dead. Lag saw Elena's heart. Largo Lloyd and Elena were good friends before she died, and she asked about his charm because it's nice. He tell her that it's a rare item and there're another matching pair and now the chief found the matching pair and delivered to Elena. Lag gave the small package (a pair of pendants) to Largo Lloyd.
18	"Letter Pigeon"; Transliteration: "Tegami Bato" (Japanese: テガミバト)	February 6, 2010	January 10, 2012
A match between the Letter Bees and a relatively unknown delivery service called the Letter Pigeons is underway in Yuusari. Lag is earlier given a challenge by Rose, the leader of the Pigeons, to determine who's the fastest postmen in the region. Rose wants to find out if people other than Letter Bees can do the job, if not better. Largo sets the rules of the match, with both teams picking up their letter and delivering at the finishing point in the Bee Hive. However, Letter Bees are not allowed to bring their dingoes. When the match begins, The Pigeons keep using dirty tricks to force the Bees off their path. Arriving to the pickup point after the Pigeons have gone, the Letter Bees receive their letter from the orphanage matron and learns that the area they are in are never visited by Bees. Although the Pigeons have a big lead, they are soon attacked by a Gaichuu, which destroys their transport. While the Pigeons run for their lives, Zazie destroys the Gaichuu. However, the Pigeons persist in delivering their letter, with Rose as their only chance. Lag is sent off to the finish line while the rest deal with more Gaichuu. After Rose is attacked by another Gaichuu, Lag defeats it and witness her flashbacks. It turns out she is friends with the orphanage, and decides to start up a delivery service for poor people when they don't have enough money to hire Letter Bees. Lag supports Rose all the way to the finish line. In the aftermath, Rose tells Lag that even though the Pigeons lost, they won't give up delivering letters.
19	"The Sick Letter Bee and Girls"; Transliteration: "Byōki no Tegami Bachi to Shōjo Tachi" (Japanese: 病気のテガミバチと少女たち)	February 13, 2010	January 11, 2012
Lag falls sick from an earlier delivery in the rain. Niche tries to help Sylvette nurse Lag back to health, but her attempts only made him feel worse. Niche helps Sylvette send Lag's sick leave letter to the Bee Hive but loses it on her way. Two thugs pick up the letter and attempt to blackmail Niche for money, however Sylvette arrives to stop them. While buying medicine, Sylvette has to drag Niche from distractions along the way. Niche goes into a tantrum and tells Sylvette that she always forces her to do things she doesn't like, and goes off to look for something to make Lag better. After finding that the particular medicine is sold out, Sylvette receives directions from the pharmacy to look for herbs. However, her wheelchair is stuck in the soft mud and begins to sink. Steak runs off to get Niche for help and Niche manages to rescue Sylvette just in time. Niche admits that Sylvette is the only one who can nurse Lag. Sylvette realizes that Niche is really concerned for Lag's well-being. They return home to find Lag recovered from his fever by Zazie's medicine when he and Connor come to visit.
20	"Lost Letter"; Transliteration: "Nakushita Tegami" (Japanese: なくしたテガミ)	February 20, 2010	January 12, 2012
Lag and Niche return to the Bee Hive and find Zazie recovering from injuries sustained by a Gaichuu attack. Aria questions Zazie on the letters he lost during the attack, citing the Bee's responsibility to find and deliver them. After some probing, Zazie reveals he went through the Hart Desert to directly deliver his letters, despite there being a safer route to do so. Lag takes up the responsibility to find the letters. After Lag's group heads for the spot Zazie last encountered the Gaichuu Absynt, they find the letters tied to Absynt's horn. Lag fires at the Gaichuu to no effect as it easily dispels his shot from an opening in its body. Steak manages to retrieve the letters but the group end up in danger. Zazie arrives to fight the Gaichuu but does not care about the delivery of the letters. Lag attacks the Gaichuu and it reveals Zazie's flashbacks, showing the Bee to have lost the letters while unable to defeat the creature with his shindan. Lag, Niche and Zazie work together to destroy the Gaichuu. Afterwards, Lag offers to deliver the letters for him but Zazie insists on going with him, saying it was his original responsibility to do so in the first place. He tells Lag he didn't explain to Aria about his own inability to defeat the Gaichuu as he wanted to do it himself.
21	"Potpourri of Memories"; Transliteration: "Kioku no Popuri" (Japanese: 記憶のポプリ)	February 27, 2010	January 13, 2012
Lag, Zazie, Connor and their dingoes pay a visit to a new relaxation lounge set up by Dr. Thunderland Jr. Inside, they are greeted by the lounge's caretaker, Mana Jones, who tells Lag how Gauche and the doctor helped her in her potpourri research. One night, Mana fell asleep causing a fire, which left her blind. Thunderland learns from the Bioscience Advisory Panel that she voluntarily resigned after the incident. In frustration, he threatens to have her dissected. Gauche learns of the doctor's outburst and discovers that Thunderland is aware of Mana's potential and concerned about her future. Thunderland looks for rare helenseed that will help in her research, and has a bottle delivered by Gauche, which touches her. During the panel's decision to terminate Mana's contract, Mana appears with Gauche with her request to continue. However the panel still decides to terminate her services. Seeing Mana's determination, the panel chairman challenges her and Thunderland to complete her research within a week to prove her results, otherwise she will have to leave.
22	"The Note that Connects Dreams"; Transliteration: "Yume Tsunagu Nōto" (Japanese: 夢つなぐノート)	March 6, 2010	January 16, 2012
Thunderland tells Gauche about Dr. Whitman, an expert in plants and vegetation and once an honored member of the Bioscience Division. If Whitman recognizes Mana's research as viable, he can put in a recommendation for her. Unfortunately, Whitman's home is located at the southernmost end of Yuusari, which will take 10 days to travel there and back, and they only have one week before the deadline. Despite this, Gauche volunteers to deliver Thunderland's request and Mana's research notebook to Whitman. Traveling through harsh environments, Gauche reaches the doctor's house but collapses from exhaustion. Whitman finally agrees to recommend Mana and Gauche heads back with his letter to Thunderland and Mana. With Whitman's recommendation, the panel has no choice but to let Mana continue her research. With Gauche's help, Mana is able to complete her research and build the lounge. Thunderland comes in with news from Jiggy Pepper about Honey Waters, a town rumored of having anti-government activists. Gauche once delivered a letter to that town and met a man known as "one who is unable to become Spirit", before he went missing. Lag and Connor are sent to Honey Waters to find out what Gauche discovered and find a strange couple, Hunt and Sarah, who escaped from Akatsuki. Sarah claims that Akatsuki is experimenting on artificial spirits and made her husband what he is, gaining the support of the townspeople. Sarah shows a black spirit amber to the crowd, which Lag recognizes as Gauche's.
23	"Honey Waters"; Transliteration: "Hanī Wōtāzu" (Japanese: ハニー・ウォーターズ)	March 13, 2010	January 17, 2012
Sarah uses Gauche's spirit amber to perform heart restoration on the townspeople. Lag asks Sarah how she got Gauche's spirit amber, but the woman claims ignorance and sends the townspeople after Lag's group. In the fight, Lag is secretly saved by Hunt who tells him to escape, while Connor and an incapacitated Niche and Steak (both drank the town's paralytic waters earlier) are captured by the townspeople. Lag encounters a girl named Ann Grado, who helps him escape only if he delivers the town's letters for them. Ann tells Lag that the "ones unable to become Spirit" came to the town five years ago and drew followers to their cause. Lag learns that gaichuu are attracted to the hearts contained in the letters. Meanwhile, Sarah and Hunt discover that Niche is a true "one unable to become Spirit", with Sarah planning to offer her to the anti-government organization Reverse. Hunt desires a normal life with Sarah, but Sarah is not satisfied with their lives. Connor finds out from Hunt that he and Sarah are just frauds. While Lag and Ann bring the bag of letters underground, they are thrown aboveground by a Gaichuu Cidre. Connor, who is freed by his dingo Gus, arrives to help Lag. Connor manages to knock the gaichuu down, but Lag is restrained by the townspeople from finishing it off. Hunt knocks the townspeople away while Zazie and his dingo arrive and knock the gaichuu back.
24	"Memories of Three Hearts"; Transliteration: "Kokoro no Kioku, Mittsu" (Japanese: こころの記憶、三つ)	March 20, 2010	January 18, 2012
Zazie arrives and threatens the townspeople holding Lag away. The three Bees formulate a plan with Connor forcing Gaichuu Cidre above ground, while Zazie keeps it from moving, and Lag to shoot its weak point at its bottom. Lag is forced to retrieve the bag of letters which falls underground. While this happens, Ann, Hunt and Zazie are subsequently caught in Cidre's grasp, which attempts to devour their hearts and memories. All three of their tragic flashbacks are shown during the attack. Zazie lost his parents to a gaichuu, Ann lost her father when he tried delivering letters outside town, Hunt willingly had his arms amputated and replaced with a creature's and become the circus' newest exhibit in order to pay off his and Sarah's debts. Lag returns and destroys Cidre, freeing its victims' hearts in the process. Lag spots Gauche's memories freed from the gaichuu and is overwhelmed with emotion.
25	"The Ones Unable to Become Spirits"; Transliteration: "Seirei ni Narenakattamono" (Japanese: 精霊になれなかった者)	March 27, 2010	January 19, 2012
Hunt's flashback is further shown, with he and Sarah leaving the circus once people loses interest in his monster hands. They wandered into the outskirts of Honey Waters and are attacked by a gaichuu, but Gauche and Roda appeared and rescued them. Gauche encountered a man named "the One Unable to Become Spirit", the leader of Reverse, an anti-government group. He asked Gauche to join his group and appeared to tell him the truth about Sylvette's condition. However, Gauche refused to join and left. The townspeople of Honey Waters discovered Hunt and Sarah and are frightened by Hunt's monster hands. Sarah saved Hunt from being attacked by lying that they were "the Ones Unable to Become Spirits" and were responsible for the killing of the gaichuu. After witnessing Hunt's flashbacks, the townspeople throw rocks at the couple, but Lag defends them, in turn prompting Sarah to defend him instead. Most of the townspeople remain anti-government, while Hunt and Sarah leave the town in Connor's carriage to go to the Bee Hive, where Dr. Thunderland Jr. will hopefully remedy a way to do something about Hunt's hands. While heading back on foot themselves, Niche is confronted by a girl named Roda, and Lag finally encounters Gauche. But the former Letter Bee no longer remembers him and steals his letter. Lag runs after Gauche to jog his memories, but the man claims to be a Marauder named Noir, and shoots him with a shindanjuu. Lag is wounded and lays sprawled on the ground, watching tearfully as Gauche and Roda leave. Lag then falls unconscious.

== Tegami Bachi Academy ==
A series of three-minute original anime shorts will be included in each Japanese Region 2 DVD of Tegami Bachi. Titled Letter Bee Academy (テガミバチ学園, Tegami Bachi Gakuen; lit. "Tegami Bachi Academy"), the omake series focuses on the background settings of the world of Amberground not touched upon or elaborated much in the anime, and provides a hilarious class setting with chibi versions of the characters.

No.	Title	Original release date
1	"Letter Bee Academy, School Opening!"; Transliteration: "Tegami Bachi Gakuen, Kaikō!" (Japanese: テガミバチ学園、開校！)	January 27, 2010 (DVD)
2	"The Secret of Spirit Ambers"; Transliteration: "Seirei Kohaku no Himitsu" (Japanese: 精霊琥珀のヒミツ)	January 27, 2010 (DVD)
3	"How to Defeat Gaichuu"; Transliteration: "Gaichū no Taoshi Kata" (Japanese: 鎧虫の倒し方)	February 23, 2010 (DVD)
4	"Search for a Dingo!"; Transliteration: "Aibō o Sagasō!" (Japanese: 相棒を探そう！)	February 23, 2010 (DVD)
5	"The Mystery of the Capital, Akatsuki"; Transliteration: "Shuto Akatsuki no Nazo" (Japanese: 首都アカツキの謎)	February 23, 2010 (DVD)
6	"Yuusari and Yodaka"; Transliteration: "Yūsari to Yodaka" (Japanese: ユウサリとヨダカ)	February 23, 2010 (DVD)
7	"Certain Victory! Bee Examination Counter-measure Course"; Transliteration: "Hisshō! BEE Shiken Taisaku Kōza" (Japanese: 必勝！BEE試験対策講座)	March 26, 2010 (DVD)
8	"Choose the Chairman"; Transliteration: "Iinchō o Erabou" (Japanese: 委員長を選ぼう)	March 26, 2010 (DVD)
9	"Don't Laugh at my Weapon"; Transliteration: "Hito no Buki o Warau na" (Japanese: 人の武器を笑うな)	March 26, 2010 (DVD)
10	"What Day is Today?"; Transliteration: "Kono Hi Nani no Hi?" (Japanese: この日何の日？)	March 26, 2010 (DVD)
11	"A Bee's Starting Wage"; Transliteration: "BEE no Shoninkyū" (Japanese: BEEの初任給)	April 23, 2010 (DVD)
12	"When He Changes into a Red Dress"; Transliteration: "Kare ga Akafuku ni Kigae Tara" (Japanese: 彼が赤服に着替えたら)	April 23, 2010 (DVD)
13	"The Doctor's Son Appears"; Transliteration: "Hakase no Musuko, Toujou" (Japanese: 博士の息子、登場)	April 23, 2010 (DVD)
14	"Wine and Tears and a Man and a Turn"; Transliteration: "Sake to Namida to Otoko to Deban" (Japanese: 酒と涙と男と出番)	April 23, 2010 (DVD)
15	"Reason for Distress"; Transliteration: "Kunō no Riyū" (Japanese: 苦悩の理由)	May 28, 2010 (DVD)
16	"Love Letter"; Transliteration: "Koi Tegami" (Japanese: 恋テガミ)	May 28, 2010 (DVD)
17	"Dingoes are Friends!"; Transliteration: "Aibō wa Tomodachi!" (Japanese: 相棒は友だち！)	May 28, 2010 (DVD)
18	"Surprise Test"; Transliteration: "Nukiuchi Tesuto" (Japanese: 抜き打ちテスト)	May 28, 2010 (DVD)
19	"A Day in the Health Room"; Transliteration: "Aruhi no Hokenshitsu" (Japanese: ある日の保健室)	June 25, 2010 (DVD)
20	"Letter Squadron Bee Ranger"; Transliteration: "Tegami Sentai Bīrenjā" (Japanese: テガミ戦隊ビーレンジャー)	June 25, 2010 (DVD)
21	"Deshinote" (Japanese: DESHINOTE)	June 25, 2010 (DVD)
22	"Purchase Department Survey"; Transliteration: "Koubaibu Ankēto" (Japanese: 購買部アンケート)	June 25, 2010 (DVD)
23	"The Troubled Boy"; Transliteration: "Nayameru Shōnen" (Japanese: 悩める少年)	July 23, 2010 (DVD)
24	"Whaaat is This Gaichuu?"; Transliteration: "Kono Gaichuu na~nda?" (Japanese: この鎧虫な～んだ？)	July 23, 2010 (DVD)
25	"Graduation"; Transliteration: "Sotsugyō" (Japanese: 卒業)	July 23, 2010 (DVD)

== Season 2: Tegami Bachi REVERSE ==
A 2nd season named Tegami Bachi REVERSE (テガミバチ REVERSE; Tegamibachi REVERSE) lit. "Letter Bee REVERSE" was announced right after the final episode of the first series. A promotional movie was shown on the official anime's website. The second season premiered on TV Tokyo, TV Osaka, TV Aichi and their affiliated stations on October 2, 2010.

The series has four pieces of theme music. The first opening theme, Chiisana Mahō (小さな魔法, Little Magic) is sung by Stereopony, while the first ending theme Wasurenagusa (勿忘草, Forget-Me-Not) is sung by Piko. The second opening theme Yakusoku (約束, Promise) is sung by Suga Shikao, while the second ending theme Perseus (ペルセウス, Perseus) is sung by Yamazaru.

No.	Title	Original release date
1	"Promise"; Transliteration: "Yakusoku" (Japanese: 約束)	October 2, 2010
The story continues where the last episode of the first season left off. The unconscious Lag is carried by Niche until Jiggy Pepper happens to pass by and offers them a ride back to the Bee Hive. Lag dreams of an injured Gauche waking up with amnesia. The leader of Reverse, Lawrence, who also calls himself the "One who was not Able to Become Spirit", gives him a new identity, Noir, and makes him a Marauder. After recovering, Lag reports to Largo, Aria and Dr. Thunderland Jr. on Gauche's amnesia and defection. Largo explains that Marauders steal letters from Bees working directly under Reverse, an organization intent on finding information to topple the Amberground government. Lag is instructed not to mention Gauche's defection to anyone. Niche tries to cheer Lag up but he remains despondent, wondering how he is going to explain to Sylvette about Gauche. However, Sylvette throws a "Thank You" party, with Aria's help, for Lag for finding her brother's whereabouts. Sylvette is glad Lag managed to find Gauche, and tells Lag she will await her brother's return once Lag brings him back. Lag is comforted by Sylvette's understanding and encouragement and both break down in tears. Zazie finds Niche's underpants outside Sylvette's house but she herself is nowhere to be found. Niche feels guilty on failing to protect Lag and has run away.
2	"Underwear and Bread"; Transliteration: "Pantsu to Pan" (Japanese: パンツとパン)	October 9, 2010
Lag and Connor split up in searching for Niche around town. Niche gets hungry and decides to finally eat Steak but has to cook him. She stumbles into a bakery and attempts to cook Steak, but is mistaken by the owners of the bakery for a burglar. After clearing up the misunderstanding, Niche is offered food by the owners, Jacob and Sandra Gobeni, and she reveals her problems to them. Sandra offers Niche a place to stay, but they are interrupted when a drunken street performer attempts a tightrope walk across rooftops. Lag tries to persuade him but to no avail. The rope snaps and the performer falls and Lag manages to grab him, but both are hanging dangerously from a great height. After hearing Sandra criticizing Lag's missing dingo, Niche comes to her senses and rescues Lag and the performer. Lag scolds Niche briefly and warmly and tells her to go back home with him. Jacob reveals to Lag that Gauche used to come to his maintenance shop often to repair his gun, and gives him a letter bullet. Lag will need to write a letter and roll it up inside the bullet, which he will use to fire it on Gauche to hopefully restore his memories. As Niche leaves with Lag and the others, she thanks Sandra for her bread as it made her feel happier. Sylvette welcomes Lag and Niche home.
3	"The Hydrangea-Colored Picture Letter"; Transliteration: "Ajisaīro no E-Tegami" (Japanese: アジサイ色の絵テガミ)	October 16, 2010
Lag ponders over what to write in the letter bullet for Gauche, and confesses to Sylvette that he doesn't have much experience writing letters. Lag's job takes him to a mansion in the countryside where he delivers a letter to Ray Attlee. He is welcomed by an exceptionally tall maid, Kimidori. Ray wants Lag to find out who sent her picture letters of hydrangea-colored mountains, and explains the pictures remind her of her childhood while living in a village. Ray's parents received governmental positions in Central and had her moved to a location close by to receive care as she is sickly. However, she is cheered up by the letters, which she feels they tell her to keep on fighting her illness. Lag searches through town for information on the origin of the letters and finds out that the hydrangea colors came from Blue Romeo flower dyes. While searching for Niche at the mansion's garden, Lag finds Kimidori picking Blue Romeo flowers and concludes she is the sender, which she readily admits. Kimidori is glad that Ray is encouraged by her letters, but refuses to tell Lag further and makes him promise not to reveal this. However, when Lag wonders how to tell Ray, he discovers Colbasso has claimed credit for the letters for her own selfish reasons. Although Lag promised not to tell, he shoots a shindan into the letter, which reveals a flashback of Ray's childhood. It turns out Ray met and befriended Kimidori when she was young. Before she moved, Ray gives her a matching hairpin as proof of their friendship. When Kimidori grew older, her family owed debts and she is forced to sell the hairpin. Feeling guilty for having sold the hairpin, Kimidori leaves home to search for Ray's current residence and eventually finds it. She then plants the Blue Romeo in the garden to remind Ray of her childhood. Ray reunites with Kimidori and thanks her for the happy memories. Inspired, Lag decides to draw a picture for his letter to Gauche but is disappointed as his drawings are awful.
4	"Wilderness Imagery Lighthouse"; Transliteration: "Kōya Gentōdai" (Japanese: 荒野幻灯台)	October 23, 2010
Lag is shown working on repairs for an imagery lighthouse situated in the desert. An old man addresses him as Lugh, his grandson who was born and raised in the lighthouse. Lag tells his grandfather of hearing odd voices and his grandfather dismisses them as his own imaginations. He explains to Lag that he is all that he has left and not to think of leaving the lighthouse like his parents did. While alone, Lag keeps seeing a strange four-eyed apparition telling him to leave and sees marks all over his body. Suddenly his grandfather appears and points a gun while muttering the word "hate". Lag realizes that the old man is not his grandfather and he is not his grandson. A flashback shows Zazie telling Lag about Jiggy Pepper who delivers express letters. Lag learns that Jiggy is heading to Liquid Sand River and goes to look for him there. Lag remembers who he is and realizes that the four-eyed apparition is actually Niche and Steak. While they face the old man who blames them for taking away his grandson, Jiggy confronts Gaichuu Korona who has taken over the dilapidated lighthouse. After Jiggy destroys Korona, the old man disappears and Lag and the others escape from the crumbling lighthouse. Lag remembers going to look for Jiggy and finds Gaichuu Korona instead. Upon entering the lighthouse to defeat it, he is overwhelmed and starts to hallucinate himself as the old man's grandson. Lag fires a shindan into the old man's journal to find out his heart. It turns out the old man was left all alone when his son refused to become the lighthouse keeper and left with his family. He began to weave fictional tales of his grandson still living with him and becoming successor to the lighthouse. The old man eventually died and the lighthouse is left deserted. Jiggy explains that the journals the old man wrote were actually filled with hatred, and Korona consumed the heart within them which overwhelmed Lag. However, thanks to Niche, who is immune to the hallucinations, Jiggy was able to easily defeat Korona. Jiggy warns Lag not to be taken in by emotions within letters and to be strong. After paying his last respects to the old man, Lag and the others ride home with Jiggy. Jiggy tells Lag that he received a letter from Neri, his sister, and thanks him for his help.
5	"Reverse World"; Transliteration: "Ribāsu Wārudo" (Japanese: リバース・ワールド)	October 30, 2010
Numerous incidents of Reverse marauders attacking Bees and stealing their letters come to a head, with Largo writing reports to the inspectors from the capital, Hazle Valentine and Caribs Garrard, who has arrived in Yuusari. Moc Sullivan comes in with news of being ambushed and losing his letters in a ravine. When Lag offers to help retrieve the letters, Hazle and Carib stop the Bees as they have no qualification to deal with Reverse, and they also suspect a leak within the Bee Hive. However, Lag, Niche and Steak stow themselves away on the inspectors' carriage. Upon discovering Lag has followed them, the inspectors decide to let him and the others follow them to the ravine. Finding the letters scattered around, Lag offers to help collect the letters when Carib tells him he will reveal what he knows about Gauche. After Lag and Niche are distracted by Carib and Hazle respectively, Carib uses a catalyzing agent that resonates with the hearts in the letters to attract a gaichuu. After Lag and Niche destroy the gaichuu, Lag inadvertently finds a letter regarding the leader of Reverse, Lawrence. He reveals he is a failed man-made spirit created by an experiment sanctioned by the government and stirs up support from the populace. Gauche/Noir is confirmed to be working for Reverse. Although disappointed, Lag remains firm in delivering letters for the people. Later, Lawrence listens to the results of the experiment to attract gaichuu from the inspectors, who are revealed to be working for Reverse. Lawrence decides the time has come for Reverse to make their next move and sends Noir and Roda to the north.
6	"Dolly"; Transliteration: "Shōjo ningyō" (Japanese: 少女人形)	November 6, 2010
Lag gets a day off from work and decides to ask Sylvette for advice on how to write the letter bullet. Lag delivers a letter to her as well, from a 10-year-old girl named M. Croce. Croce likes the dolls Sylvette makes and requests to have a doll of her likeness made by tomorrow for her brother who is away. Sylvette decides to use a doll of her own likeness to rework it into Croce's image. In the morning, Sylvette goes to Dogra to deliver the doll and Lag insists on accompanying her. Sylvette wants to board a carriage but Lag warns her that letters get stolen frequently in that direction. While Lag and Sylvette sleep inside the carriage while on the way to Dogra, Autobahn, a thief disguised as an old woman steals Sylvette's package. Lag and Sylvette awaken from the commotion and try to stop Autobahn from escaping, however Lag and Autobahn fall off the carriage and the doll is thrown and left hanging over a precarious cliff. While Lag goes to retrieve the doll, Sylvette goes after Autobahn who has hijacked the carriage to make his escape. Niche arrives with Lag's gun and Lag uses it to shoot the doll back to her. The shindan resonates with the doll and reveals Gauche's thoughts before he entered Akatsuki. Sylvette decided to make a doll of her likeness to give to Gauche, but he leaves for the capital before she completes it. She wanted to help Croce as the girl's situation resembles her and Gauche's relationship. Meanwhile, Sylvette manages to stop the carriage and defeat the thief. She presents the doll to a grateful Croce upon reaching the town. Back at the Hive, Largo and Aria receive an eyewitness report of Gauche in the north.
7	"Film Noir"; Transliteration: "Firumu Nowāru" (Japanese: フィルム ノワール)	November 13, 2010
Eyewitness reports show that Gauche/Noir and Roda were seen heading to North Yodoka, towards the town of Blue Notes Blues. Lag and Niche are sent to the town to investigate and seek out Noir. Dr. Thunderland Jr. tells them that the Maka originated from that place as well, with hopes that Niche will be able to awaken the blood of the Maka within her. While trying to keep up with Niche when nearing the outskirts of the town, Lag discovers a strange gaichuu not encountered before. Lag finds Noir's empty cartridges and attempts to fire a shindan to reveal Noir's heart, but is thrown down a crevasse and buried underneath. Meanwhile, Zazie and Wasiolka try to locate missing letters elsewhere and encounter Noir and Roda who knock them out. While trapped below the ravine, Lag watches Gauche's flashbacks and sees Lawrence asking him to join Reverse and gave a girl to assist him. Gauche had the girl take him to visit places that his former self once lived. They both watched the Bee Hive and later Sylvette from a distance. The girl shows Gauche a failed experiment from Akatsuki who is washed ashore, and explains that the government was trying to recreate ancient spirits. She reveals that she is one of the experiments that managed to live and escaped. Later, Gauche threw away his former identity and took on the name of Noir, Lawrence's personal marauder. In the present, Zazie wakes up and attacks Noir, telling him that he won't allow such a dangerous man like him to go near Lag. However, he is knocked down once again and manages to see Noir's memories of dealing with the gaichuu Lag saw earlier. Lag sees Gauche's flashback of naming the girl Roda. He realizes that Gauche still remembers his former dingo's name and so there is a chance to help him regain more memories. Niche arrives to rescue Lag and they head for the town. Niche has Lag follow her through a shortcut, telling him that she knew because she was born in Blue Notes Blues 200 years ago.
8	"Blue Notes Blues"; Transliteration: "Burū Nōtsu Burūsu" (Japanese: ブルー・ノーツ・ブルース)	November 20, 2010
Lag reads a book on the people of Blue Notes Blues who lived peacefully with the Maka. However, this ended when people's hearts were polluted by sin. Lag discovers a cave near the lake but is told not to enter by the townspeople. They take Lag and the others back to town. When Lag asks about Noir, they confirm that Noir went to the cave, which is a path leading to Blue Notes Scale and the holy site. The mayor warns Lag not to enter as he will be punished severely. He explains the history of how the townspeople suffered when the geothermal energy around the town was stolen, leading to dead crops and widespread illness. A pregnant woman named Celica became greedy and decided to drink the water of the underground lake to gain immortality. Accompanied by Celica's return, the town returned to normal. However, Celica became quiet and eventually gave birth to twins before she died, which are the children of Maka. Lag and Niche head to Blue Notes Scale where they find frozen gaichuu and discover that Noir was there luring one outside to kill. They venture further and find the lake where another child of Maka, Niche's sister, appears. She questions Niche on her forgotten memory. The mayor and townspeople follow after Lag, where they plead the Maka for forgiveness. Niche's sister tells them that the Maka lost the ability to converse with humans and they have no interest to do so. She corrects Lag on the townspeople's story: Celica was actually forced to enter the cave to become a sacrifice for the Maka when the lack of warmth persisted, which was caused by the mining of spirit amber in the region. Celica begged the Maka to at least let her unborn child live. For the first time, the Maka sheds a tear for a human, and the tear blesses Celica. After Celica gave birth to the twins and died, the town declared them to be cursed and kept them isolated with only water as sustenance. Eventually, the town feared the existence of the twins will bring shame to them all, and the mayor's ancestor threw the children into the frozen lake.
9	"200 Years of Solitude"; Transliteration: "Hitori bocchi no ni hyaku nen" (Japanese: ひとりぼっちの二百年)	November 27, 2010
Niche's sister attacks Lag and the townspeople but Niche defends them. Confused and angry, Niche's sister is shot by Lag with his shindan, revealing the time he first met Niche and their friendship. Despite this, Niche's sister believes Niche has forgotten how the humans treated them and attempts to kill her and Lag. Lag gets Steak to take the injured Niche to a safe place and declares that he will not let Niche's sister get away with how she hurt her own sister. Although curious at Lag having a spirit amber in his eye, Niche's sister makes another attempt to end Niche's life. However, Lag tells her that Niche is herself no matter she is human or Maka, and then fires another shindan directly at Niche's sister. A flashback shows that both sisters were always together even though they were mistreated by the townspeople, until they were separated when Niche is washed away from her sister. The sister sinks to the bottom of the lake and grows sad, eventually transforming into her adult form. Instead of searching for Niche, she decided to stay in the cave where the Maka resided as she believed that Niche would sense her heritage and make her way back like she did. Lag throws the sister back to her senses by saying she was foolish like a human as well. Her heart softened, the sister takes Niche to Tir na Lake to heal her wounds. She also explains to Lag that the gaichuu frozen in the cave are metamorphosing when they shed their last piece of heart and the Maka froze them to prevent them from causing chaos to the world. The sister then entrusts Niche to Lag to help her mature, though Niche stays in the lake to heal her wounds for the time being. As Lag leaves, both the Maka and Niche's sister sense him as the Light, looking forward to what he will become.
10	"Veritably Abbey"; Transliteration: "Beritaburī shūdōin" (Japanese: ベリタブリィー修道院)	December 4, 2010
Zazie wakes up with Lag beside him. He learns that Lag came to the city of Pierce when he heard that a Bee was wounded and taken here. From what both Zazie's eyewitness accounts of a molting gaichuu and what Niche's sister told him, Lag learns that the spirit insects were chosen creatures born from the fusion of small insects and spirit energy beings in the land. But when their last bit of heart has shed away, they turn into gaichuu. It seems that the spirit insects encased in amber given to Bees pose no threat, but the ones without will threaten world order and bring peril to the land. Lag becomes concerned about what the government does in this country and how it came to be. Lag and Zazie head off for the town of Lament by carriage and meet Connor there, who is making his deliveries. Connor tells them that he has fallen in love with a girl from the Veritably Abbey who sold cookies to him for one time, unbeknownst to them, is actually Roda. Connor buys cookies from a red-headed girl named Sunny who tells them that the white-haired girl only came to the Abbey once. After seeing Roda nearby, Lag comes to the conclusion that the Abbey is a base for Reverse. He tells Connor to head back to the Hive and alert Largo to this place while he disguises as a girl to gain access to the Abbey, as men are not allowed on the premises. After Sunny invites Lag in for shelter, she heads for her prayers. Lag follows and discovers that the nuns are led by Roda to believe that by sacrificing themselves, they will help revolutionize the government and save their fellow humans. Lag goes off to explore but is caught by Roda, who recognizes him, which leads to a short fight. Roda tells Lag they will exact ultimate revenge on the government, using the molten gaichuu as a weapon.
11	"Cabernet Attacks"; Transliteration: "Kaberune shūrai" (Japanese: カベルネ襲来)	December 11, 2010
While the nuns head for the prayer hill of Angel Wings to prepare for their sacrifice, Sunny is ordered to poison Connor with her cookies. Connor goes into the abbey to investigate the claims of Reverse using it as a base, and encounters Lag and Roda fighting. Roda takes Connor hostage and makes her escape, leaving Connor confused and disappointed that she is a member of Reverse all along. Hazle and Caribs, the inspectors from Akatsuki, return and destroy the abbey with explosives to conceal Reverse's activities while making a fake report back to the government. After Lag and Connor make it out of the debris safely, Lag goes after Roda. Sunny finds Connor and gives him the cookies to eat, which causes him to collapse. Sunny and the abbey's sad past is revealed: despite trying to work hard, the abbey never rose above poverty and hardship, which made them easy prey for Reverse to convince them of its ideals. Before leaving for Angel Wings, Sunny leaves a note for Connor, who is only paralyzed by a special medicine instead of the poison. Lag tries to convince Roda what Reverse does is wrong, but Roda attacks him anyway, leading to Zazie coming to Lag's rescue. The molten gaichuu Cabernet arrives, and Lag figures out that Reverse wants the abbey nuns to become sacrifices for Cabernet to drain their hearts. Noir appears and attacks, but Lag realizes he lost his letter bullet to Roda. With Zazie distracting Noir, Lag pours his heart into his shindan and fires at Noir, hitting him. Connor goes after Sunny, who stated in her note that she isn't sure whether being a sacrifice is right, but she wanted everyone to be happy, including Connor whom she liked. Connor arrives too late to save Sunny, as her and the nuns' hearts are taken by Cabernet. After being hit by Lag's shindan, Gauche appears to recognize Lag.
12	"Light Shines on the Darkness"; Transliteration: "Hikari, yami o terasu" (Japanese: 光、闇を照らす)	December 18, 2010
Gauche appears to have recovered to his former self, but he walks away from Lag. Lag goes after him but is blocked by Roda. A large group of gaichuu, Lao-Lao, arrives to attack them. Lag and Zazie's attacks are not able to fend off Lao-Lao. Unknown to them, the traitorous capital inspectors are controlling the gaichuu to attack them while Cabernet gets away. However Niche arrives on the scene to restrain Lao-Lao with a new ability using her hair, and Lag destroys the gaichuu in one shot. Roda tries to follow Noir but she falls through a crevasse but Lag grabs her in the nick of time. Roda does not understand why he would save her and Lag explains that he feels Roda is the same Roda that was Gauche's former dingo, and encourages her to keep fighting to protect her master. However, Roda frees herself of Lag's grip and seemingly falls to her death, lamenting that she is Reverse's Roda. However, she leaves Lag the letter bullet she stole from him. While Zazie fends off Cabernet, Lag goes after Noir to attempt reviving his memories of being Gauche. When Connor arrives with a comatose Sunny, Lag becomes disappointed with what Reverse and Noir have done. Spurred by his emotions, Lag's spirit amber charges up. Noir fires a shindan at him but Lag easily erases it. Lag declares that he will erase him from existence and shoots Noir, knocking him out. Cabernet is attracted to the heart Lag radiates and grabs both him and Noir. Lag is initially unable to target Cabernet's weak point, but Noir awakes and directs him to attack together. Cabernet is hit by both shindans but gets away. In the aftermath, Lag is told Connor will stay with Sunny until she wakes while Zazie goes after Cabernet. Lag brings a comatose Noir back to the Bee Hive where Thunderland Jr. will analyze his condition. Aria and Sylvette are glad that Lag has brought back Gauche, and Lag feels that for a brief moment Gauche came back to him when they both attacked Cabernet.
13	"Crimson Melody"; Transliteration: "Benihīro no senritsu" (Japanese: 紅緋色の旋律)	December 25, 2010
On the government's request, Largo sends Zazie in charge of the personnel that will head east to destroy Cabernet. Lag undergoes examination by Dr. Thunderland Jr. after he fired too many shindans. Aria is sent to deliver a letter to Houdai Franklin, a man who worked aboard the airship. Hearing this, Lag sends a reluctant Niche to accompany Aria as her temporary dingo. The duo head for Black Cherry Pond which will lead to Houdai's current residence, which is rife with gaichuu. While crossing the pond, they are attacked by gaichuu Tequila Sunrise. Despite Aria's objections, Niche goes to attack the gaichuu, prompting Aria to use her shingengakki to attack. However she loses concentration as she hasn't attacked for a long time. When the gaichuu captures Aria, Niche sees her memories of the time she grew up and later worked with her dingo, a dog named Bolt. Thanks to Bolt, she plotted a set of safe delivery routes for the rest of the bees. Despite being disappointed she has no worthy skill to deliver letters, Aria continues to rely on Bolt for his support. Niche frees Aria from the gaichuu and encourages her to fight, saying she's the only one to defeat them and translated Bolt's howls that he will always protect her. Aria is encouraged and finally gains the concentration to destroy Tequila Sunrise. A flashback shows Aria worried about Gauche's safety and well-being, while Bolt has to retire from his duties due to old age. Aria wanted to quit but is told by Largo to stay on as administrative assistant. Meanwhile Lawrence talks to Signal, he gatekeeper of the bridge to Bifrost, who is revealed to be supporting Reverse with his brother. Lawrence informs Signal that Cabernet has been spotted and his people will soon direct it to attack Akatsuki.
14	"The Day of Flicker"; Transliteration: "Mabataki no hi" (Japanese: 瞬きの日)	January 8, 2011
Aria and Niche head to Houdai Franklin's house. Franklin attacks them upon meeting but Aria manages to convince him that she just wants to know the truth about the Day of Flicker. In flashback, Franklin was an engineer working on the airship with his friend Negich. The purpose of using the airship to travel to the artificial sun wasn't explained to the construction crew. A number of characters such as Dr. Thunderland Jr., a group of Bee triplets (with two of them serving as the gatekeeper between Bifrost and Yuusari in the present) were present aboard the ship. When Franklin wanted to steer the ship in order to get a clearer look at Akatsuki, the artificial sun gave out and flickered a few times. This momentary lapse in the sun's rays caused a huge disturbance among the crew, Franklin included, who claimed to see a monster in the sun calling for its "mother". Soon after, the airship crashed and most of them died except for Franklin, Thunderland Jr., the triplets and Balor, the general commander sent to oversee the operation. Each of them are left either partially or completely blinded. Meanwhile, Lag takes a turn for the worse and his heart energies are in danger of overflowing. When Thunderland Jr. and his staff try to stop the flow, they witness Lag involuntarily summoning visual flashbacks of his life with some imagery appearing not to be seen elsewhere before. After Lag recovers, Gauche wakes up with his memories returned, much to the delight of everyone, especially Sylvette. While Lag reunites with Gauche, Franklin tells Aria that he believes that the artificial sun is an abomination that will eventually consume all the hearts of the inhabitants and it is too late for Gauche to ever recover his lost memories.
15	"Welcome Home"; Transliteration: "Okaerinasai" (Japanese: おかえりなさい)	January 15, 2011
Lag requests Largo and Thunderland Jr. to allow Gauche to go back home with Sylvette, but the request is denied. Both men want to know how Gauche is able to regain his lost heart as well as what happened during the period he was in Akatsuki. However, Largo allows Gauche to return home for the night as he believes this will be better for his well-being. Lag tells Gauche the good news and will pick him up after his delivery, but Gauche decides to accompany him as his dingo. Although Lag feels that he's not a wonderful Bee, Gauche tells him that by returning his lost heart to him, he is one. Gauche apologizes to Lag for not able to keep his promise to look for his mother in Akatsuki. Back home, Sylvette welcomes Gauche back and thanks Lag for keeping his promise. Roda returns alive, as she spies on Gauche at his house. Thunderland Jr. warns Largo that since Gauche can access the memories that Lag does, it's possible he's still Noir pulling off a deception on them. The next morning, Lag discovers that Gauche has disappeared from his room. Meanwhile, the capital inspectors inform Lawrence on Gauche's regaining his memories. Since he can't be a Marauder anymore, Lawrence orders the inspectors to dispose of him. He then peers down a cliff to an unknown gaichuu.
16	"Roda, Wanders"; Transliteration: "Roda, samayō" (Japanese: ロダ、彷徨う)	January 22, 2011
Sylvette goes into town looking for her brother, while Lag goes to the Bee Hive. He finds Dr. Thunderland Jr. and Hunt, who has become his assistant, but both of them have not seen Gauche returning. A flashback shows that after Roda survived her fall, she made her way to Yuusari to look for Noir. Hunt and Sarah rescue her from some thugs and they give her a place to stay. She learns from them that Gauche has woken up in the Bee Hive. Roda follows Lag and Gauche around but is eventually found by Sarah, who takes her under her wing in the employment agency when she learns that Roda was a dingo. Largo orders the Bees for a city wide search and Lag stumbles onto Sarah's agency. He tells Sarah that Gauche has disappeared and Roda immediately leaves the building, but is sensed by Niche. After reporting the failure in the search, Niche decides to head out and search for Gauche herself but encounters Roda. Both fight, however Niche is much stronger and nearly overpowers Roda until Gauche steps in to save her. Over Niche's protests, Gauche declares himself as Noir and leaves with Roda. Lag arrives too late to learn from Niche the bad news.
17	"Lies and Truth"; Transliteration: "Uso to shinjitsu" (Japanese: 嘘と真実)	January 29, 2011
Lag learns from Niche and Sarah that Noir is supposedly back as well as Roda. The capital inspectors reach the Bee Hive to search for Gauche to no avail. They reveal their intention to interrogate Sylvette, so Lag and Niche head to her home ahead of the inspectors. Lag has Sylvette lend him her clothes to impersonate her so that he will be taken by the inspectors instead for her safety. Largo learns from a reliable tip that there are more Marauders around Yuusari. Gauche and Roda return to Reverse, but are unable to find Lawrence and the other members. The inspectors arrive with the disguised Lag to meet Gauche, stating their real intention is to kill him as well as his sister. Lag hears from their conversation that they are Reverse and accidentally blows his cover. Meanwhile, Largo explains to Aria and Sylvette that Valentine and Garrard are actually Marauders who have successfully infiltrated the Amberground government. The inspectors attempt to kill Lag but Niche fights them. Lag returns Gauche's weapon to him. Niche is distracted by Valentine and falls into an impenetrable cage. Gauche declares himself as Noir and wants to return to Reverse, but the inspectors do not believe him. Noir explains that he used Lag's memories to fabricate Gauche's personality and thoughts to deceive Lag and the others. Lag is devastated and breaks down, while Noir tells Garrard he will kill Lag as proof of his loyalty to Reverse. Niche rescues Lag from being shot by Noir but causes a collapse around them. As the Reverse members attempt to check if they are still alive, Jiggy Pepper arrives by orders from Largo and attacks them, causing them to retreat. Jiggy tries to follow but is blocked by Noir, who facilitates Reverse's escape. Lag and Niche, who remained unharmed, are picked by Jiggy and sent home. Lag is disappointed that the letter bullet did not work but Jiggy reminds him that Noir did not use a shindanjuu to kill him, meaning that he did not wish to reveal his heart to Lag, offering a chance that Gauche might be in there somewhere.
18	"The Lost Heart Bullet"; Transliteration: "Ushinawa reta shindan" (Japanese: 喪われた心弾)	February 5, 2011
Largo, Aria and Niche discuss on the possibility that Noir has been using Lag's memories of Gauche as a deception, but Sylvette insists that her brother did return. Aria informs the others that the light from Akatsuki can make people lose their hearts. Zazie continues his investigation into Cabernet's whereabouts and finds its last location at the bottom of a cape near a seaside town. The gaichuu Jinro attacks a boy hanging dangerously off a cliff and Zazie fights the gaichuu, while a mysterious man observes. The man eventually rescues the boy and chastises Zazie's stance on eliminating gaichuu. Meanwhile, Noir, Roda, Valentine and Garrard row up the Rosie River to investigate an abandoned government research facility where those were unable to become spirit washed downstream. Noir is ordered to look through a large pile of dead artificial spirits to look for any live ones. During the search, Garrard explains how the government formed two types of research: repairing the artificial sun and creating artificial spirits. The experiment failed and the facility was shut down. Valentine accidentally causes the spirit disposal system to go active, which begins clearing up the pile of dead spirits. Noir hears a sound from the pile and rescues two live artificial spirits. The disposal machine malfunctions and destroys the facility, but the Reverse group manage to make it to safety. Lag receives news from Wasiolka about Zazie's discovery and heads there with Niche. Zazie fights several Reverse members and finds Cabernet, but discovers the man he met earlier is a marauder named Jeel. Both fight but Zazie realizes that he can't hurt Jeel with his shindan, as the marauder has no spirit and driven by hatred. Lag and Niche arrive at Cabernet's location and Lag attempts to fire a shindan at it, but to no avail. Lawrence appears and tells Lag that he has lost the heart to focus on what's right, and invites him to join Reverse to regain it.
19	"Neither Malice, Nor Hatred"; Transliteration: "Akui de naku, zouo de naku" (Japanese: 悪意でなく、憎悪でなく)	February 12, 2011
Zazie fires off his Blue Thorn shindans at Jeel to no avail. Lawrence tells Lag that despite his intention to deliver people's hearts, it is the government who stole their hearts, as well as Gauche's and his mother, Anne Seeing. While Lag begins to hesitate from Lawrence's words, Cabernet awakens and heads to where Zazie and Jeel are fighting. It captures Jeel and proceeds to drain his spirit. Jeel realizes that Cabernet is attracted to the heart that now surrounds him when Zazie kept firing on his body. Jeel's flashbacks are shown, where he escapes from the research facility and joins Reverse in order to take revenge on the government for experimenting on them. Zazie changes his mind and rescues Jeel from Cabernet but both land at the bottom of the cape. Jeel recovers and climbs up the cliff to rejoin his group, while Lag and Zazie follow after him. At the top, the inspectors order Jeel to dispose of Zazie. Jeel hesitates but knocks Zazie off the cliff as well as Lag, but Niche and Wasiolka rescue them. The group rallies and confronts Jeel once more. Zazie defeats Jeel by firing his Blue Thorn, not with hatred or malice, but with sadness. Jeel is overwhelmed, but is then killed by Garrard. Zazie mourns Jeel's death and encourages Lag to deal with Cabernet, and convinces him to stick to his faith. Lag confronts Lawrence, Gauche, Roda and the artificial spirits, but realizes he still cannot fire shindans. His heart restores and Lag discovers he can use Gauche's Gymnopedie, and fires at Gauche, which splits away from him and hits Cabernet, destroying its wings. Lag turns to face Lawrence's group but discovers they have escaped in the confusion. At the same time, Cabernet retreats by burrowing itself underground.
20	"The Smile of Hope"; Transliteration: "Kibō no hohoemi" (Japanese: 希望の微笑み)	February 19, 2011
Lag and Zazie report to the Bee Hive about the Gaichuu Carbernet incident saying it escaped by burrowing itself underground. Concerned that the gaichuu might recover and rise up to attack, Zazie suggests that the only way to locate the gaichuu is to use Connor's dingo Gus. Back at Sylvette's house Lag tells Sylvette what happened to Connor at Lamento Town and decides to make soup for him. Largo then sends Lag to deliver a letter for Connor in Lament. When he gets there, the entire town has been abandoned but he finds Gus who leads them to Connor. They discover that the people who had their heart stolen by the gaichuu have died and Connor had buried them all. Lag gives him the letter but after reading it Connor says he can't go. They go back to the former Reverse hideout to find that Sunny was the only one who survived but can't remember anything except baking cookies and Connor had been watching over her ever since. Lag then tells Connor to keep believing that she may come back and that they should take her back to the Bee Hive. But after some persuasion from Lag, Connor refuses and tells Lag to leave but lets them take Gus with them. Niche then says that Gus would feel sad leaving him. Sunny comes out and gives Niche some cookies and everyone sees her smile revealing that she still has some heart. Connor realizes that Sunny baked cookies to make people happy but he never saw her smile as he never felt happy eating them. Connor changes his mind and decides to go back along with Sunny and Gus. They all go back by carriage and Lag remembers Sylvette's soup and gives it to Connor who doesn't want it.
21	"Lawrence's Ambition"; Transliteration: "Rorensu no yabō" (Japanese: ロレンスの野望)	February 26, 2011
Sylvette sends Lag and Niche off while Lag promises to defeat the Carbernet and bring back Gauche's heart. Meanwhile Largo leaves for a business trip for unknown circumstances and puts Aria Link in charge while he's away. Dr. Thunderland says he'd look after Sunny while she's recovering at the Bee Hive. Then Aria sends Lag, Zazie, and Connor to go look for the Carbernet. Meanwhile, the Reverse organization is seen hiding out at one of Lawrence's mansions where the government experiments are shown recuperating with Roda looking after them. As Roda confronts Gauche, she is struck with a mysterious disease as well as the other experiments. During their search, Gus begins to catch the scent of the Carbernet, and the direction it plans to go toward is Yuusari. The group immediately decides to head back to Yuusari to confront the gaichuu. While Roda is suffering from her illness Lawrence orders Gauche to free the gatekeeper twins Signal and Signales planning to use them. On their way back to the mansion, the twins tell Gauche Lawrence's plans to use them for their special abilities and say the experiments would become sacrificed to strengthen the gaichuu. Before they get back, the experiments are sent off to a different location along with Roda. Lag, Zazie, and Connor are then seen at the Hill of Prayer putting up traps while they are being watched. When Gauche gets back, Gauche questions Lawrence to confirm of his true intentions and finds out that it is all true . As Gauche attempts to stop Lawrence, Lawrence pulls out a gun to shoot him, but Gauche breaks through a window and escapes by jumping off a cliff into a flowing river.
22	"A Place to Return To"; Transliteration: "Kaeri tai basho" (Japanese: 帰りたい場所)	March 5, 2011
Lag and his friends are waiting for the Carbernet to appear. Noir, having escaped Lawrence, makes his way to Sinners Bread and Weapon Store and gets a shindanjuu from Jacob Gobeni. Meanwhile Roda and the other ones who could not become spirits are taken to a dark place later revealed to be Dr. Thunderland's laboratory. As the Bees prepare to attack Cabernet, they are in turn ambushed by Garrard and Valentine who try to stop them from destroying Cabernet. Garrard tells Lag that the artificial sun steals people's hearts and Bees are actually indirectly helping this by delivering letters. Cabernet does not appear, to the chagrin of the Bees, as Garrard explains he used spirit ambers to lure other gaichuu instead. Sylvette runs into Gauche outside the bakery store. She learns from her brother that he has no memories of her or their time together. She is sad, but encourages Gauche to do whatever he needs to do and to take care, hoping that he will one day come back. Aria ponders over the report of Signal and Signaless' disappearance. She enters Thunderland Jr.'s lab and discovers that the artificial spirits are hiding inside, with Hunt treating their sickness. Thunderland appears behind Aria and forces her to help them. Meanwhile, Connor and Zazie are captured by the gaichuu who is about to consume their hearts. Gauche arrives and frees them, much to the surprise of Lag and the others.
23	"In Akatsuki"; Transliteration: "Akatsuki nite" (Japanese: アカツキにて)	March 14, 2011
Lag is surprised to see that Gauche has saved them from the gaichuu who has come to demand the whereabouts of the government experiments from Garrard and Valentine. As Gauche attempts to attack them Lag and Niche block his path to protect them. When he is about to shoot Gauche to bring back his memories, the ground shakes and Lag and Gauche fall into a cave. While in the cave Noir reassures Lag that he isn't Gauche Suede anymore as Lag still believes he's Gauche when he tries to shoot him. Noir then delivers his heart to Lag showing the memories that he's retained and Lag realizes that they're all Noir's. Suddenly, Lag catches a shindan that shows what happened to Gauche in Akatsuki. It is revealed he met Lag's mother near the artificial sun telling her that he delivered Lag and went on a long adventure with him and they became friends. Gauche tells her that he'd deliver her heart to Lag but collapses, and Lags mother tells him she had stolen his heart as the artificial sun shows its eye taking their hearts. Afterwards, Noir tells Lag that the Gauche he once knew no longer exists. Lag comes to the realization that his top priority is to stop the Carbernet. They are then rescued by Niche, Zazie, and Connor. They regroup and plan where to attack the Carbernet when it suddenly resurfaces and they notice it has gotten bigger. Lag, Zazie, and Noir all charge toward the gaichuu firing their shindanjuus.
24	"Final Battle! Yuusari Central"; Transliteration: "Kessen! Yuusari Chuuou" (Japanese: 決戦！ユウサリ中央)	March 21, 2011
The combined attacks from Lag, Noir and Zazie hit the torso of Cabernet, but the gaichuu easily shrugs off their attack, having developed a resistance to their shindans. Even Niche's attacks does no damage on its armor. Eventually Cabernet ignores the group and leaves. Having been warned of Cabernet's impending attack, the inhabitants of Yuusari Central begins a massive evacuation from the city. Soon enough, Cabernet rampages through the now deserted city, with Lawrence, Garrard and Valentine in tow. Lawrence planned for the artificial spirits to be settled inside the Bee Hive, so that Cabernet will consume them as well as the stockpile of letters containing a huge amount of hearts, so that it will grow stronger. Cabernet smashes into the Hive, but cannot find anything to consume. Aria, along with a small group of Bees, place the Reverse group under arrest. While Lawrence is confused by this turn of events, Aria explains the artificial spirits were indeed transported to the Hive, not as sacrifices for Carbernet, but for Dr. Thunderland Jr. to treat their illnesses and evacuated with the rest of the citizens. The ones who ruined Lawrence's plan was Signal and Signalness. Both of them explain that though they still hate the government for their plight, they could not stand by and watch the artificial spirits be sacrificed. Despite this, Cabernet goes off to attack the citizens who have evacuated to a higher part of the city walls. Niche's sister makes a surprise appearance as the form of the Maka to battle Cabernet. Largo Lloyd arrives with Jiggy Pepper and tells the Reverse group that he traveled to Blue Notes Blues to enlist the help of Niche's sister. Garrard uses spirit amber powder to lure gaichuu into the city and provide a distraction so that they can escape. Lag's group returns to help but they are told to fight Cabernet while Zazie and Connor assist the rest of the Bees in repelling the rest of the gaichuu. Lag, Noir, Roda, Niche and her sister join forces against Cabernet. As Cabernet captures numerous citizens, Lag tells Noir that he's still the strong and kind Gauche he once knew, and they work together to fire their shindans and finally defeat Cabernet. Just as everyone celebrates, Lawrence reappears and allows himself to be consumed by Cabernet. Cabernet regains its strength and re-grows its wings. As it flies off towards Akatsuki, debris blown from its flight hit Noir, who was blocking Lag from them. Lag screams for Noir to wake up, who is bleeding profusely and has fallen unconscious.
25	"Light of the Heart"; Transliteration: "Kokoro no hikari" (Japanese: 「こころ」の光)	March 28, 2011
As the Carbernet heads toward the artificial sun, Noir is severely injured but shortly regains consciousness to tell Lag to defeat the gaichuu and hands him his gun. With the help of Maka lifting him up, Lag's heart begins to shine brightly like the artificial sun which catches the Carbernet's attention and turns toward Lag. Using all his strength, he shoots the Carbernet with both shindanjuus and ultimately defeats the gaichuu. But Lag passes out shortly after. Lag then wakes up in Gauche's room seeing Sylvette and Niche by his side. Noir appears, recovered from his wound, and tells Lag he's going to leave to live with those unable to become spirit. Everyone is then seen at the city gates seeing Noir and the experiments off. Noir hugs Lag and tells him they're friends then they all bid a fond farewell. Maka and Niche's sister also leave to go back to Blue Notes Blues. Garrard and Valentine quit being marauders and leave. Later all the towns people take part rebuilding Yuusari and everyone continues on with their lives with Sarah and Hunt continuing to work for Dr. Thunderland, and a recovered Sunny baking cookies, albeit without her memories. The gatekeeper twins go back by carriage to Bifrost, and Largo gets a letter from Jiggy Pepper saying that they now live in Blue Note Blues. Finally, Lag continues his job as a Letter Bee delivering letters to people.
