= Aimi Haraguni =

Japanese singer-songwriter and guitarist

AIMI 原国 愛海
- Born: Aimi Haraguni; September 4, 1990 (age 36); Naha, Okinawa Prefecture, Japan
- Genres: Pop rock; J-pop
- Occupations: Singer-songwriter; guitarist
- Instruments: Vocals; guitar
- Years active: 2007–present
- Labels: gr8!; OHELLO Records
- Formerly of: Stereopony; Alice in Underground
- Website: aimi-official.com

Aimi Haraguni (Japanese: 原国 愛海; born September 4, 1990), known professionally as AIMI, is a Japanese singer-songwriter and guitarist from Naha, Okinawa Prefecture. She was the lead vocalist and guitarist of the pop-rock band Stereopony from 2007 until its breakup in 2012, and began a solo career in 2016.

== Career ==
=== Stereopony and Alice in Underground ===
Haraguni met bassist Nohana Kitajima at a music studio in Okinawa and invited her high-school classmate Shiho Yamanoha to play drums. The musicians formed Stereopony in 2007. The band made its major-label debut in 2008 and disbanded in December 2012.

After the breakup, Haraguni returned to Okinawa for about a year. In 2014 she formed the unit Alice in Underground with Hiroki Arai.

=== Solo career ===
Haraguni began solo activities under the name AIMI in September 2016. She has said that working alone allowed her to move beyond the rock-focused sound of Stereopony and explore pop and other styles. Her first solo concert, Color Collection, was held in April 2017.

In September 2017, she launched a crowdfunding campaign to expand a planned mini-album into a full-length album. It met its initial target within eight minutes and ultimately raised about 360 percent of the goal. Her debut solo album, Aimilion (アイミライオン), was released on April 4, 2018. She performed at AnimeNEXT in New Jersey in 2019.

In 2019 Haraguni founded the independent label OHELLO Records. She released the digital EP Life in 2020; by 2026, TV Asahi reported that she had issued more than twenty works through the label.

== Personal life ==
In April 2026, Haraguni disclosed that she is raising a child as a single mother.

== Selected discography ==
=== Studio albums ===
- Aimilion (アイミライオン) (2018)

=== Singles and EPs ===
- Katakoi. (カタコイ。) (2019)
- Life (2020)
