= The Back Horn (album) =

Studio album by The Back Horn
- Released: May 28, 2007
- Label: Victor Entertainment

The Back Horn chronology
| Taiyou no Naka no Seikatsu (2006) | The Back Horn (2007) | Best the Back Horn (2008) |

The Back Horn is the sixth major label album release of the Japanese rock band of the same name. The album was released on May 28, 2007, via Victor Entertainment.

== Track listing ==
1. Haisha no Kei (敗者の刑) – 5:34
2. Hello (ハロー) – 5:27
3. Utsukushii Namae (美しい名前) – 5:26
  Fifteenth major single.
4. Maihime (舞姫) – 4:46
5. Freesia (フリージア) – 5:08
6. Koukai (航海) – 6:20
7. Niji no Kanata e (虹の彼方へ) – 5:14
8. Theater (シアター) – 5:12
9. Oubeki Kizu (負うべき傷) – 4:51
10. Koe (声) – 4:22
  Fourteenth major single.
11. Risou (理想) – 5:03
12. Eda (枝) – 4:44
