= Ubugoe Chainsaw =

Live album by The Back Horn
- Released: August 24, 2005
- Genre: Alternative rock
- Label: Victor Entertainment; Speedstar Records

The Back Horn chronology
Headphone Children (2005)	Ubugoe Chainsaw (2005)	Taiyou no Naka no Seikatsu (2006)

Ubugoe Chainsaw (産声チェインソー) is the first, and currently only live album of the Japanese rock band, The Back Horn. The album was released on August 24, 2005. It peaked at number 46 on Oricon Albums Chart.

== Track listing ==
1. Kagi overture (鍵 overture) – 2:16
2. Tobira (扉) – 4:46
3. Unmei Fukuzatsukossetsu (運命複雑骨折) – 4:33
4. Cobalt Blue (コバルトブルー) – 4:25
5. Koufuku na Nakigara (幸福な亡骸) – 5:29
6. Ame (雨) – 6:03
7. Mugen no Arano (無限の荒野) – 4:10
8. Hakaishi Fever (墓石フィーバー) – 4:31
9. Headphone Children (ヘッドフォンチルドレン) – 9:03
10. Naiteiru Hito (泣いている人) – 8:01
11. Namida ga Koboretara (涙がこぼれたら) – 5:32
12. Sunny (サニー) – 4:03
13. Hikari no Kesshou (光の結晶) – 6:06
14. KIZUNA Song (キズナソング) – 6:32
