= Hitohira no Hanabira =

Single by rock group Stereopony

Single by Stereopony
- Released: November 5, 2008
- Genre: Rock
- Label: gr8!
- Songwriter(s): Aimi Haraguni; Nohana Kitajima; Shiho Yamanoha

Stereopony singles chronology
| "Hitohira no Hanabira" | ""Namida no Mukou"" |

Music video
- "Hitohira No Hanabira" on YouTube

"Hitohira no Hanabira" is the first single by the Japanese rock group Stereopony. It was released on November 5, 2008, under gr8! Records. The main track, "Hitohira no Hanabira", was the 17th ending theme for the anime series Bleach.

The single reached #25 on the Oricon Weekly Charts.

== Track listing ==
1. Hitohira no Hanabira (ヒトヒラのハナビラ, lit. A Single Flower Petal)
2. Nyamī (ニャーミィ)
3. Yūkan na Funny Friends (勇敢なファニーフレンズ, Yūkan na Fanī Furenzu, lit. Brave Funny Friends)
4. "Hitohira no Hanabira" (Instrumental)

=== Oricon Sales Chart (Japan) ===
| Release | Chart | Peak Position | Sales Total |
|---|---|---|---|
| November 5, 2008 | Oricon Weekly Singles Chart | 25 | 15,489 |
