= Taiyō no Naka no Seikatsu =

Studio album by The Back Horn
- Released: April 19, 2006
- Genre: Alternative rock
- Label: Speedstar Records

The Back Horn chronology
Ubugoe Chainsaw (2005)	Taiyō no Naka no Seikatsu (2006)	The Back Horn (2007)

Taiyō no Naka no Seikatsu (太陽の中の生活) is the fifth major label album release of the Japanese rock band, The Back Horn. The album was released on April 19, 2006. It peaked at number 19 on Oricon Albums Chart.

== Track list ==
1. Chaos Diver (カオスダイバー) – 4:50
  Thirteenth major single.
2. Apoptosis (アポトーシス) – 4:51
3. Shōmei (証明) – 4:38
4. White Noise (ホワイトノイズ) – 5:08
5. Sekai no Hate de (世界の果てで) – 4:38
6. Tenki Yohō (天気予報) – 3:11
7. Fighting Man Blues (ファイティングマンブルース) – 4:15
8. Black Hole Birthday (ブラックホールバースデイ＜Album Version＞) – 5:35
  Eleventh major single.
9. Ukiyo no Nami (浮世の波) – – 4:25
10. Yurikago (ゆりかご) – 5:19
11. Hajimete no Kokyū de (初めての呼吸で＜Album Mix Version＞) – 5:15
  Twelfth major single.
