= Asylum (The Back Horn album) =

Studio album by The Back Horn
- Released: September 15, 2010
- Genre: Alternative rock
- Labels: Victor Entertainment; Speedstar Records

The Back Horn chronology
Pulse (2008)	Asylum (2010)	LivesSquall (2012)

Asylum is the eighth major label album release of the Japanese rock band The Back Horn. The album was released on September 15, 2010.

== Track listing ==
1. Raiden (雷電) – 'Raiden'
2. Rafflesia (ラフレシア) – 'Rafflesia'
3. Tatakau Kimi yo (戦う君よ) – 'You will fight'
  Eighteenth major single.
4. Saisei (再生) – 'Play'
5. Hagoromo (羽衣) – 'Plumage'
6. Kaigansen (海岸線) – 'Coastline'
7. Persona (ペルソナ) – 'Persona'
8. Taiyou no Shiwaza (太陽の仕業) – 'The work of the sun'
9. Tozasareta Sekai (閉ざされた世界) – 'Closed World'
  Nineteenth major single.
10. Yogorenaki Namida (汚れなき涙) – 'Tainted Tears'
11. Parade (パレード) – 'Parade'
