= Ikiru Sainō =

2003 studio album by the Back Horn

Studio album by The Back Horn
- Released: October 22, 2003
- Genre: Alternative rock
- Label: Speedstar Records

The Back Horn chronology
| Shinzou Orchestra (2002) | Ikiru Sainō (2003) | Headphone Children (2005) |

Ikiru Sainō (イキルサイノウ) is the third major label album release of the Japanese rock band, The Back Horn. The album was released on October 22, 2003.

== Track listing ==
1. Wakusei Melancholy (惑星メランコリー) – 4:42
2. Hikari no Kesshō (光の結晶) – 5:21
  Sixth major single.
3. Kodoku na Senjō (孤独な戦場) – 4:36
4. Koufuku na Nakigara (幸福な亡骸) – 4:30
5. Hanabira (花びら) – 4:28
6. Platonic Fuzz (プラトニックファズ) – 4:50
7. Seimeisen (生命線) – 4:31
  Seventh major single.
8. Hane ~Yozora o Koete~ (羽根～夜空を越えて～) – 5:47
9. Akame no Rojō (赤眼の路上) – 4:51
10. Joker (ジョーカー) – 5:06
11. Mirai (未来) – 5:16
  Fifth major single and theme song to the movie Akarui Mirai.
