= The Back Horn =

Japanese rock band

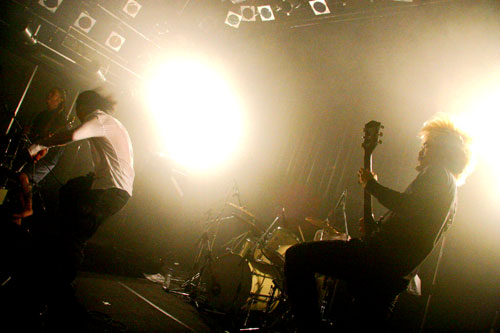

Background information
- Origin: Tokyo, Japan
- Genres: Indie rock, alternative rock, post-grunge
- Years active: 1998–present
- Labels: Victor Entertainment; Speedstar Records
- Members: Masashi Yamada; Eijun Suganami; Kohshu Okamine; Shinji Matsuda
- Past members: Naoki Hirabayashi
- Website: thebackhorn.com

The Back Horn (ザ・バックホーン; stylized as THE BACK HORN) is a Japanese rock band, formed in Tokyo in 1998.

== History ==
The band got started around April in 1998, when the original members all came to Tokyo from the countryside where they all lived, all for different reasons. They met, and decided to start a band. First called Gyorai, they soon changed their name to The Back Horn. This name was based on Matsuda's misreading of the "backhoe" he used in his construction work. From the beginning, one of the features of the band was a harsh sound and lyrics dealing with decadence and destruction, war, peace, isolation, love and death. In a 2005 interview, the band members listed Nirvana and Radiohead as inspiration for their musical style.

Following their first notable performance at the Fuji Rock Festival in 1999, they released a mini-album Doko e Yuku on Kando Records. Seven months after that, they released their first full-length, Yomigaeru Hi. After this, the band got signed to a major label, Speedstar Records. Although they, to this day, still remain on Speedstar Records' roster, they're still often thought of as an indie band. It was also around this time when Hirabayashi decided to leave the band.

It was only after their first album Ningen Program got released on Speedstar Records, that they found a new bassist, Okamine Koushu, though he wasn't immediately made a full-time member. He was however involved in recording of the next album, Shinzou Orchestra, and while touring for the album, the band announced that he was now an official member. In the period when The Back Horn were between bassists, vocalist Yamada overtook bass duties.

As the band was becoming increasingly popular, they were asked to provide music for 2 movies: Kiyoshi Kurosawa's Bright Future and Kazuaki Kiriya's Casshern, releasing the album Ikiru Sainou in between them.

After a couple of tours, including a show at the Rock In Japan festival, a couple of single releases and the release of their first live DVD, they released their 5th full-length, Headphone Children, considered by many to be a concept album. The song Kiseki from the album was used in the horror movie Zoo. The tour following Headphone Children was a huge success and the band decided to release a live album of it, entitled Ubugoe Chainsaw which contained the best performances of songs from the tour. 2 months later, Back Horn played their first show in Europe, at a festival in Barcelona, Spain.

The band then released several singles and did some shows, including an acoustic street tour with only Yamada and Suganami, where they performed on the streets of Japan for free. In April, 2006 they released their 6th full-length, Taiyou no Naka no Seikatsu, and then their 7th album in May, 2007, self-titled The Back Horn. Their 16th major single release, Wana, was used as the first ending theme to the 2007 anime series Mobile Suit Gundam 00. In January, 2008, they released a compilation album Best the Back Horn to celebrate their 10-year anniversary. Their 8th album titled Pulse was released on September 3, 2008.

== Members ==
Current members

- Masashi Yamada – vocals
- Eijun Suganami – guitar
- Koushu Okamine – bass
- Shinji Matsuda – drums

Former members

- Naoki Hirabayashi – bass

== Discography ==
=== Singles ===
- Fuusen – 2000/09/25
- Sunny – 2001/04/25
- Sora, Hoshi, Umi no Yoru – 2001/08/22
- Sekaiju no Shita de – 2002/05/29
- Namida ga Koboretara – 2002/08/28
- Mirai – 2003/01/22
- Hikari no Kesshou – 2003/06/18
- Seimeisen – 2003/08/20
- Yume no Hana – 2004/07/21
- Cobalt Blue – 2004/11/03
- Kizuna Song – 2005/01/26
- Black Hole Birthday – 2005/12/16
- Hajimete no Kokyuu de – 2006/02/08
- Chaos Diver – 2006/03/22
- Koe – 2006/12/20
- Utsukushii Namae – 2007/03/21
- Wana – 2007/11/14
- Kakusei – 2008/05/21
- Tatakau Kimi Yo – 2010/04/21
- Tozasareta Sekai – 2010/08/04
- Sirius – 2012/03/07
- Battle Ima – 2013/09/18
- Symmetry/Kowaremono – 2014/02/19
- With You – 2016/10/19]
- Anata ga Matteru feat. Hikaru Utada – 2017/02/22]
- Kodoku wo Tsunaide – 2017/07/05
- Kibou wo Narase – 2021/12/05
- Saigo ni Nokoru Mono – 2023/10/04

=== Albums ===
- Doko e Yuku (mini-album) – 1999/09/22
- Yomigaeru Hi – 2000/04/25
- Ningen Program – 2001/10/17
- Shinzou Orchestra – 2002/11/13
- Ikiru Sainou – 2003/10/22
- Headphone Children – 2005/03/16
- Taiyou no Naka no Seikatsu – 2006/04/19
- The Back Horn – 2007/05/23
- Pulse – 2008/09/03
- Asylum – 2010/09/15
- LiveSquall – 2012/06/06
- Akatsuki no Fanfare – 2014/04/09
- Unmei Kaika – 2015/11/25
- Joukei Dorobou (mini-album) – 2018/03/07
- Carpe Diem – 2019/10/23
- Anthologia – 2022/04/13
- Shinai Naru Anata e – 2025/01/29

=== Compilations ===
- Best The Back Horn – 2008/01/23
- B-side The Back Horn – 2013/09/18
- Best The Back Horn II – 2017/10/18
- All Indies The Back Horn – 2018/10/17

==== Live album ====
- Ubugoe Chainsaw – 2005/08/24

== Trivia and use in popular culture ==
The song "Blade" by The Back Horn is used as the entrance music for Japanese professional wrestlers and mixed martial arts fighters Yukio Sakaguchi and Hikaru Sato. It was also used as the theme music for the Dramatic Dream Team event "Max Bump 2013" and was the official theme song for their Hard Hit sub brand from 2010 to 2012.
