= Ningen Program =

Studio album by The Back Horn
- Released: October 17, 2001
- Genre: Alternative rock
- Label: Speedstar Records

The Back Horn chronology
Yomigaeru Hi (2000)	Ningen Program (2001)	Shinzou Orchestra (2002)

Ningen Program (人間プログラム) is the first major label album release of the Japanese rock band, The Back Horn. The album was released on October 17, 2001. It peaked at number 30 on Oricon Albums Chart.

== Track listing ==
1. Ikusen Kounen no Kodoku (幾千光年の孤独) – 4:19
2. Serenade (セレナーデ) – 4:33
3. Sunny (サニー) – 3:54
  First major single.
4. Hachigatsu no Himitsu (8月の秘密) – 3:23
5. Suisou (水槽) – 4:40
6. Mr. World (ミスターワールド) – 3:45
7. Hyou Hyou to (ひょうひょうと) – 3:55
8. AKAI YAMI (アカイヤミ) – 3:49
9. Ame (雨) – 5:43
10. Sora, Hoshi, Umi no Yoru (空、星、海の夜) – 5:36
  Second major single.
11. Yuuyake March (夕焼けマーチ) – 3:45
