= Shinzō Orchestra =

Studio album by The Back Horn
- Released: November 13, 2002
- Genre: Alternative rock
- Label: Speedstar Records

The Back Horn chronology
Ningen Program (2001)	Shinzō Orchestra (2002)	IKIRU SAINOU (2003)

Shinzō Orchestra (心臓オーケストラ) is the second major label album release of the Japanese rock band, The Back Horn. The album was released on November 13, 2002. It peaked at number 50 on Oricon Albums Chart.

== Track listing ==
1. WATABOUSHI (ワタボウシ) – 4:58
2. Game (ゲーム) – 3:56
3. Namida ga Koboretara (涙がこぼれたら) – 4:44
  Fourth major single.
4. Natsukusa no Yureru Oka (夏草の揺れる丘) – 4:54
5. Materia (マテリア) – 4:43
6. Dinner (ディナー) – 4:37
7. Yuugure (夕暮れ) – 5:15
8. Yasei no Taiyō (野生の太陽) – 4:42
9. Sekaiju no Shita de (世界樹の下で) – 5:04
  Third major single.
10. Nukumori Uta (ぬくもり歌) – 5:22
