= Doko e Yuku =

EP by The Back Horn
- Released: September 22, 1999
- Genre: Alternative rock
- Label: Independent

The Back Horn chronology
Doko e Yuku (1999)	Yomigaeru Hi (2000)

Doko e Yuku (何処へ行く) is a mini-album released by the Japanese rock band The Back Horn on September 21, 1999. This was the band's first indie release.

== Track list ==
1. Pink Soda (Pinku Sōda, ピンクソーダ) - 3:45
2. Crow (Karasu, カラス) - 4:54
3. Winter's Milk (Fuyu no Miruku, 冬のミルク) - 4:48
4. Torpedo (Gyōrai, 魚雷) - 4:22
5. Praying for Rain (Amagoi, 雨乞い) - 0:56
6. Mysterious Cloud (Ayashiki Kumoyuki, 怪しき雲ゆき) - 4:29
7. Autumn (Banshū, 晩秋) - 4:41
8. Wherever I go (Doko e Yuku, 何処へ行く) - 5:03
