= Yomigaeru Hi =

Studio album by THE BACK HORN
- Released: April 25, 2000
- Genre: Alternative rock
- Label: Independent

THE BACK HORN chronology
| Doko e Yuku (1999) | Yomigaeru Hi (2000) | Ningen Program (2001) |

Yomigaeru Hi (甦る陽) is the first full album released by the Japanese rock band, THE BACK HORN. It was released on April 25, 2000, and is the band's only full-length independent album.

== Track listing ==
1. Circus (サーカス) – 4:50
2. Hashiru Oka (走る丘) – 5:35
3. Shin Sekai (新世界) – 6:44
4. Limousine Drive (リムジン ドライブ) – 4:04
5. Mugen no Koya (無限の荒野) – 4:03
6. Yomigaeru Hi (甦る陽) – 5:51
7. Akanezora (茜空) – 5:21
8. Hitorigoto (ひとり言) – 4:29
9. Saraba, Ano Hi (さらば、あの日) – 4:55
10. Naiteiru Hito (泣いている人) – 7:40
