= Chiisana Mahō =

Single by Stereopony
- Released: December 08, 2010
- Genre: Rock
- Label: Sony Records
- Songwriter(s): Aimi Haraguni

Stereopony singles chronology
"Over Drive" (2010)	"Chiisana Mahō" (2010)

"Chiisana Mahō" is the eighth single by the Japanese rock group Stereopony. It was released on December 8, 2010, under Sony Records. The main track was the first opening theme for the anime Letter Bee Reverse.

== Chart performance ==
The single reached number 27 on the Oricon Weekly Chart.

== CD or CD+DVD track list ==
1. Chiisana Mahō (小さな魔法 Little Magic)
2. Everything OK!!!
3. It's a Wild World
4. Chiisana Mahō (Instrumental)

== Limited pressing track list ==
1. Chiisana Mahō (小さな魔法 Little Magic)
2. Everything OK!!!
3. It's a Wild World
4. Chiisana Mahō (Instrumental)
5. Chiisana Mahō -Opening Edition-
