= Tsukiakari no Michishirube =

Single by Stereopony
- Released: November 4, 2009
- Recorded: 2009
- Genre: Rock
- Label: gr8! Records
- Songwriter(s): Aimi Haraguni

Stereopony singles chronology
"Smilife" (2009)	"Tsukiakari no Michishirube" (2009)

"Tsukiakari no Michishirube" (ツキアカリのミチシルベ) is the fifth single by the Japanese rock group Stereopony under label of gr8! Records on November 4, 2009. The single's main track "Tsukiakari no Michishirube" is the opening theme for the anime series Darker than Black: Gemini of the Meteor.

In an Anime News Network poll, "Tsukiakari no Michishirube" was voted as one of the best openings from 2009. About.com also praised the song while reviewing the anime of Gemini of the Meteor.

== Track listing ==
1. "Tsukiakari no Michishirube" (ツキアカリのミチシルベ, lit. "Moonlight Signpost")
2. "Daidaiiro" (橙色, lit. "Orange")
3. "Fuzz"
4. "Tsukiakari no Michishirube" ～Instrumental～

=== Oricon Sales Chart (Japan) ===
Release	Chart	Peak Position	Sales Total
November 4, 2009	Oricon Weekly Singles Chart	8	11, 906
