= Bivattchee =

Japanese band

Bivattchee ビバッチェ
- Origin: Hiroshima Prefecture, Honshu, Japan
- Genres: Rock
- Years active: 1997–2009
- Label: Gr8! Records
- Past members: Shinichi Tsutsumi; Katou Eizi; Yamamoto Kyoshichi; Tashiro Shiniti

Bivattchee (ビバッチェ, Bibatche) was a Japanese rock band. The band's song "Taiyou no Mannaka e" was used as the third opening theme song of the anime series Eureka Seven. The group disbanded on March 1, 2009.

== Band members ==
- Shinichi Tsutsumi: vocalist, born on October 11, 1977.
- Katou Eizi: guitar player, born on August 30, 1978.
- Yamamoto Kyoshichi: bass guitar player, born on March 10, 1978.
- Tashiro Shiniti: drummer, born on May 16, 1977.

== Discography ==
=== Albums ===
Aoi Karasu

Released: April 4, 2002

No.	Title	Length
1.	"Hanbunko"
2.	"ROCKET Hanabi"
3.	"Sakura no Hana ga Chiru Mae ni"
4.	"Ride On Drive"
5.	"Shiroi Tsuki"
6.	"246 ~Kimi ni Ai ni Iku~"
7.	"DRIVE Shimashou"
8.	"Nandarou"
9.	"I'm walkin'"
10.	"Minamimawari no Kaz"

GLASS no Tsuki to Gin no Hana (ガラスの月と銀の花, lit. Glass moon and Silver flower)

Released: March 24, 2004

No.	Title	Length
1.	"Koucha no Koi" (紅茶の恋)
2.	"Sakura no Hana ga Chiru Mae ni" (桜の花が散る前に)
3.	"Kami wo Nadete Gomakashite" (髪をなでてごまかして)
4.	"Ai no Umibe" (愛の海辺)
5.	"ROLLING MONKEY"
6.	"PLASTIC MORNING ~Asa no Atatakai~SOUP no Tame ni~" (プラスチックモーニング～朝の温かいスープのために～（album version）)
7.	"Kanjusei no Hana" (感受性の花)
8.	"HEY TAXI" (ヘイ タクシー)
9.	"Kaze no Tayori" (風のたより)
10.	"750KILLER" (750キラー)
11.	"HONEY & STRAWBERRY" (ハニー & ストロベリー)
12.	"LOVE IS ALL"

Blue Bird Journey

No.	Title	Length
1.	"Introduction"	0:20
2.	"Blue Bird Journey"	3:08
3.	"Taiyou no Mannaka he" (太陽の真ん中へ)	3:14
4.	"Love & Sun"	4:18
5.	"R×C×W"	1:48
6.	"HAPPY BIRTHDAY"	2:15
7.	"Moshimo Ashita Sekai ga Owatta to Shitemo" (もしも明日世界が終わったとしても)	4:02
8.	"49"	0:50
9.	"Sen no Yoru wo Koete" (千の夜を超えて)	4:23
10.	"Kokoro ni Furu Yuki" (心に降る雪)	3:03
11.	"Kabi" (カビ)	2:04
12.	"BROTHER" (ブラザー)	4:32
13.	"Love song"	3:09
14.	"Haru no Hikari ni Tsutsumareta" (春の光に包まれて)	4:21

Moshimo Ashita Sekai ga Owatta to Shitemo (もしも明日世界が終わったとしても, lit. Even if tomorrow the world ends)

Released: July 20, 2005

No.	Title	Length
1.	"Moshimo Ashita Sekai ga Owattato Shitemo" (もしも明日世界が終わったとしても)
2.	"Love & Sun"
3.	"Ore no Kutsuzoko ni Chikyuu ga Haritsuite" (俺の靴底に地球が張り付いて)
4.	"R&R music"
5.	"One Way"
6.	"Moshimo Ashita Sekai ga Owattato Shitemo ~another world~" (もしも明日世界が終わったとしても ～another world～)

=== Singles ===
Hanbunko

Released: January 16, 2002

1. Hanbunko (Halved)
2. I'm walkin'
3. Shiroi Tsuki (White Moon) (live version)

Seishun no Honoo

Released: March 19, 2003

1. Seishun no Honoo (Fire of Youth)
2. Harukaze (Spring Breeze)
3. Let's Roll (instrumental)
4. PLASTIC MORNING (soliloquy)

Sakura no Hana ga Chiru Mae ni/Kouchya no Koi (桜の花が散る前に / 紅茶の恋, lit. Before the cherry blossoms fall/Love tea)

Released: January 24, 2004

No.	Title	Length
1.	"Sakura no Hana ga Chiru Mae ni (Before the Cherry Blossoms Fall)" (桜の花が散る前に)
2.	"Koucha no Koi (Love of Black Tea)" (紅茶の恋)
3.	"Ai no Umibe (Seashore of Love) (soliloquy)" (愛の海辺（独り言）)

Taiyou no Mannaka e (太陽の真ん中へ, lit. To the center of the sun)

Released: December 7, 2005

No.	Title	Length
1.	"Taiyou no Mannaka e (To The Center of the Sun)" (太陽の真ん中へ)
2.	"Kimi to Waratta Kisetsu (The Season When You Laughed)" (君と笑った季節)
3.	"Taiyou no Mannaka e ~EUREKA OPENING MIX~" (太陽の真ん中へ～EUREKA OPENING MIX～)
4.	"Taiyou no Mannaka e ~INSTRUMENTAL~" (太陽の真ん中へ～INSTRUMENTAL～)
