= Music of Mobile Suit Gundam 00 =

This article lists the albums attributed to the series Mobile Suit Gundam 00.

== Soundtracks ==
=== Mobile Suit Gundam 00 Original Soundtrack 01 ===
Mobile Suit Gundam 00 Original Soundtrack 01

Soundtrack album by Kenji Kawai
- Released: January 10, 2008
- Genre: Anime soundtrack
- Length: 43:30
- Labels: flying DOG; JVC Entertainment
- Producer: Kenji Kawai

Mobile Suit Gundam 00 Original Soundtrack 01 (MBS・TBS系アニメーション 機動戦士ガンダムOO ORIGINAL SOUNDTRACK 01) is the first from the anime series Mobile Suit Gundam 00 season one. The entire album was composed by Kenji Kawai.

All music is composed by Kenji Kawai.

No.	Title	Length
1.	"Exercise"
2.	"Unknown"
3.	"Alarm Bell"
4.	"Intervention"
5.	"Innovation"
6.	"Power"
7.	"Attack"
8.	"Turn Back"
9.	"Windless"
10.	"Tension"
11.	"Setsuna"
12.	"Union"
13.	"Control"
14.	"Beating"
15.	"Communist Camp"
16.	"Daily"
17.	"League"
18.	"Unrest"
19.	"Crisis"
20.	"Administration"
21.	"Hallelujah"
22.	"Eyes"

=== Mobile Suit Gundam 00 Original Soundtrack 02 ===
Mobile Suit Gundam 00 Original Soundtrack 02

Soundtrack album by Kenji Kawai, L'Arc-en-Ciel, THE BACK HORN
- Released: March 26, 2008
- Genre: Anime soundtrack
- Length: 1:08:02
- Labels: flying DOG / JVC Entertainment

Second soundtrack from the series.

Catalog Number

VTCL-60022

All music is composed by Kenji Kawai.

No.	Title	Length
1.	"Imperial Princess"
2.	"Peace"
3.	"Each Other"
4.	"Ever"
5.	"Holiday"
6.	"Approach"
7.	"Thirst"
8.	"Seizure"
9.	"Firelight"
10.	"Forward"
11.	"Mortify"
12.	"Expectation"
13.	"Reaction"
14.	"New Moon"
15.	"Despair"
16.	"Sorrow"
17.	"Desert"
18.	"Palace"
19.	"Reason"
20.	"Fight"
21.	"Love Song"
22.	"Separation"
23.	"Uproar"
24.	"Solitude"
25.	"Stratagem"
26.	"Recover"
27.	"Reboot"
28.	"Possibility"
29.	"Counterattack"
30.	"Tears"
31.	"Memory"
32.	"Scenery"
33.	"Beating"
34.	"Cross Road"
35.	"DAYBREAK'S BELL (Gundam 00 Edit) / L'Arc-en-Ciel"
36.	"Wana (TV Size) / THE BACK HORN"

=== Mobile Suit Gundam 00 Original Soundtrack 03 ===
Mobile Suit Gundam 00 Original Soundtrack 03

Soundtrack album by Kenji Kawai
- Released: December 24, 2008
- Genre: Anime soundtrack
- Length: 53:43
- Labels: flying DOG / JVC Entertainment

Third soundtrack from the series. First press comes with a mini-poster.

Catalog Number

VTCL-60088

Track listing

All music is composed by Kenji Kawai.

No.	Title	Length
1.	"Unified World"
2.	"Distortion"
3.	"Determination"
4.	"Strike"
5.	"Katharon"
6.	"A-LAWS"
7.	"Fighting Force"
8.	"00 GUNDAM"
9.	"Affection"
10.	"Extermination"
11.	"Take-Off"
12.	"Power Attack"
13.	"Repose"
14.	"Agitation"
15.	"Secret Maneuver"
16.	"Threatening Sign"
17.	"The Ballroom"
18.	"Innovator"
19.	"Interception"
20.	"The Devine"
21.	"Restart"
22.	"Ash Like Snow (Anime ver.) / the brilliant green"
23.	"Friends (Anime ver.) / Stephanie"

=== Mobile Suit Gundam 00 Original Soundtrack 04 ===
Mobile Suit Gundam 00 Original Soundtrack 04

Soundtrack album by Kenji Kawai
- Released: April 1, 2009
- Genre: Anime soundtrack
- Labels: flying DOG / JVC Entertainment

The fourth soundtrack from the series.

Catalog Number

VTCL-60099

Track Listing

All music is composed by Kenji Kawai.

No.	Title	Length
1.	"Sign"
2.	"Calmness"
3.	"Artifice"
4.	"Declaration"
5.	"Situation"
6.	"Memento Mori"
7.	"Recollection"
8.	"Tactics"
9.	"Grief"
10.	"Automaton"
11.	"Comeback"
12.	"Home"
13.	"Invasion"
14.	"Relief"
15.	"Coup d'etat"
16.	"Tragedy"
17.	"Prayer"
18.	"Resolve"
19.	"0-RAISER"
20.	"Spirit"
21.	"00-RAISER"
22.	"Masurao"
23.	"TRANS-AM RAISER"
24.	"Affectionately"
25.	"Scramble"
26.	"Decisive Battle"
27.	"Solitariness"
28.	"HAKANAKU MO TOWA NO KANASHI (Anime ver.)"
29.	"NAMIDA NO MUKOU (Opening Edition)"
30.	"TRUST YOU (Gundam 00 Version)"
31.	"PROTOTYPE【TV-Size(1)】"
32.	"PROTOTYPE【TV-Size(2)】"
33.	"PROTOTYPE【TV-Size(3)】"
34.	"PROTOTYPE【TV-Size(4)】"
35.	"PROTOTYPE【TV-Size(5)】"
36.	"PROTOTYPE【TV-Size(6)】"

== Singles ==
=== Daybreak's Bell ===
Single of Mobile Suit Gundam 00 first season's first opening theme, used from episode 1 to episode 13. The song is also used as the ending theme for episode 25 as well as the ending theme for the last episode of the second season. First press comes with a Gundam 00 sticker and Setsuna F Seiei data card.

Catalog Number

KSCL-1200

Track listing

1. DAYBREAK'S BELL
2. Natsu no Yūutsu[SEA IN BLOOD 2007] (夏の憂鬱; "Summer Melancholy")
3. DAYBREAK'S BELL (hydeless version)
4. Natsu no Yūutsu[SEA IN BLOOD 2007] (TETSU P'UNKless version)

=== Ash Like Snow ===
Single of Mobile Suit Gundam 00 first season's second opening theme, used from episode 14 to episode 25. Limited Edition includes a bonus DVD containing a music video and making-of footage, a Gundam 00 sticker and Allelujah Haptism data card. First press of the Regular Edition comes with a Gundam 00 sticker and Allelujah Haptism data card.

Catalog Number

DFCL-1438 (Limited Edition)
DFCL-1440 (Regular Edition)

Track listing

1. Ash Like Snow
2. goodbye and good luck -Piano Arrange Version-
3. Ash Like Snow -Original instrumental-

=== Hakanaku mo Towa no Kanashi ===
Single of Mobile Suit Gundam 00 second season's first opening theme, used from episode 2 to episode 13. The song is also used as the ending theme for episode 1. Limited Edition includes a bonus DVD featuring footage of some songs from Uverworld's "PROGLUTION TOUR 2008", a Gundam 00 sticker and Setsuna F Seiei data card. Gundam 00 Edition, which is a limited-time issue only available until the end of December 2008, includes Setsuna F Seiei data card, a bonus track ("Hakanaku mo Towa no Kanashi (Anime ver.)"), and comes housed in a deluxe digipak case and illustration of Mobile Suit Gundam. First press of the Regular Edition comes with a Gundam 00 sticker and Setsuna F Seiei data card.

Catalog Number

SRCL-6892 (Limited Edition)
SRCL-6894 (Gundam 00 Edition)
SRCL-6895 (Regular Edition)

Track listing (Gundam 00 Edition)

1. Hakanaku mo Towa no Kanashi (儚くも永久のカナシ; "Fleeting and Everlasting Sorrow")
2. Taion (体温; "Thermoregulation")
3. Halzion (ハルジオン, Harujion)
4. Hakanaku mo Towa no Kanashi (Anime ver.)

=== Namida no Mukou ===
Single of Mobile Suit Gundam 00 second season's second opening theme, used from episode 14 onwards. Gundam 00 Edition, which is a limited-time issue only available until the end of March 2009, includes Allelujah Haptism data card and a bonus track ("Namida no Mukou ~Opening Edition~") and comes housed in a deluxe digipak case. First press of the Regular Edition comes with Allelujah Haptism data card and a wide-cap sticker.

Catalog Number

SRCL-6946 (Regular Edition)
SRCL-6947 (Gundam 00 Edition)

Track listing (Gundam 00 Edition)

1. Namida no Mukō (泪のムコウ; "Across the Tears")
2. Stereopony no Tabi wa Tsuzuku (ステレオポニーの旅は続く; "Stereopony's Journey Continues")
3. Hitohira no Hanabira ~AIMI Acoustic Version~ (ヒトヒラのハナビラ; "Petal Pieces")
4. Namida no Mukō ~Opening Edition~
5. Namida no Mukō ~Instrumental~

=== Wana ===
Single of Mobile Suit Gundam 00 first season's first ending theme, used from episode 1 to episode 13. Limited Edition has a bonus track, "Serenade Live at NHK HALL in 2007", and comes with Lockon Stratos data card.

Catalog Number

VICL-36361 (Limited Edition)
VICL-36362 (Regular Edition)

Track listing (Limited Edition)

1. Wana (罠; "The Trap")
2. Mafuyu no Hikari (真冬の光; "Midwinter Light")
3. Mizubashō (水芭蕉; "Skunk Cabbage")
4. Serenade Live at NHK HALL in 2007 (セレナーデ Live at NHK HALL in 2007)

=== Friends ===
Single of Mobile Suit Gundam 00 first season's second ending theme, used from episode 14 to episode 24. First press comes with Tieria Erde data card.

Catalog Number

SECL-594

Track listing

1. Friends (フレンズ, Furenzu)
2. LET'S GO!!
3. because of you (Acoustic ver.)

=== Prototype ===
Single of Mobile Suit Gundam 00 second season's first ending theme, used from episode 2 to episode 13. First press comes with Lockon Stratos data card.

Catalog Number

VTCL-35055

Track listing

1. Prototype
2. squall
3. Prototype (without Vocal)
4. squall (without Vocal)

=== Trust You ===
Single of Mobile Suit Gundam 00 second season's second ending theme. Gundam 00 Edition includes Tieria Erde data card and a bonus track ("Trust You -Gundam 00 Version-"). First press of the Regular Edition comes with Tieria Erde data card and a wide-cap sticker.

Catalog Number

SRCL-6972 (Regular Edition)
SRCL-6973 (Gundam 00 Edition)

Track listing (Gundam 00 Edition)

1. Trust You
2. Brand New World
3. Koi wa Groovy×2 -DJ-PASSION MORE PASSION REMIX-
4. Trust You -Gundam 00 Version-
5. Trust You -instrumental-

=== Love Today ===
Single of Mobile Suit Gundam 00 first season's insert song, used in episode 19 and 24. It is described as a theme about the love between Saji Crossroad and Louise Halevy.

Catalog Number

VTCL-35023

Track listing

1. LOVE TODAY
2. Boku ni ha Dekinai (ボクニハデキナイ)
3. LOVE TODAY (without vocal)
4. Boku ni ha Dekinai (without vocal)

=== Tomorrow ===
Single of Mobile Suit Gundam 00 second season's insert song, sung by Ayumi Tsunematsu as her character Marina Ismail. It was used in episodes 14, 15, 18, 20, 21 and in the ending battle of episode 25 as well as the ending theme for episode 14.

Catalog Number

VTCL-35054

Track listing

1. TOMORROW
2. TOMORROW ~Episode 14 Ending Theme~
3. TOMORROW for BGM ~Piano version
4. TOMORROW for BGM ~Strings version
5. TOMORROW (without vocal)
6. TOMORROW ~Episode 14 Ending Theme~ (without vocal)

=== Tozasareta Sekai ===
Single of Mobile Suit Gundam 00 the Movie's opening theme.

Catalog Number

VIZL-377 (Limited Edition)
VICL-36592 (Regular Edition)

Track listing (Limited Edition)

1. Tozasareta Sekai (閉ざされた世界; "Closed World")
2. Mayonaka no Raion (真夜中のライオン; "Lion of Midnight")
3. Keishō (警鐘; "Warning Alarm")

=== Qualia ===
Single of Mobile Suit Gundam 00 the Movie's ending theme.

Catalog Number

SRCL-7361 – SRCL-7362 (Limited Edition)
SRCL-7363 (Regular Edition)
SRCL-7364 (Gundam 00 Edition)

Track listing (Limited Edition)

1. Qualia (クオリア, Kuoria)
2. Wakasa Yue Entelecheia (若さ故エンテレケイア)
3. Ultimate

Track listing (Gundam 00 Edition)

1. Qualia (クオリア, Kuoria)
2. Hakanaku mo Towa no Kanashi (儚くも永久のカナシ; "Fleeting and Everlasting Sorrow")
3. CHANGE
4. Qualia ~for Movie~

=== Mō Nani mo Kowakunai, Kowaku wa Nai ===
Single of Mobile Suit Gundam 00 the Movie's insert song.

Catalog Number

VTCL-35099

Track listing

1. Mō Nani mo Kowakunai, Kowaku wa Nai (もう何も怖くない、怖くはない)
2. TW
3. Mō Nani mo Kowakunai, Kowaku wa Nai (without vocal)
4. TW (without vocal)

== Voice Actor Singles ==
=== Mobile Suit Gundam 00 Voice Actor Single 1: Soup/Hakosora ===
The first character CD, featuring Mamoru Miyano as Setsuna F Seiei. Music is done in collaboration with Skoop On Somebody. First press comes with a collaboration card and housed in a deluxe digipak case.

Catalog Number

VTCL-35030

Track listing

1. "Soup"
2. "Hakosora" (箱空; "Empty Box")
3. "Soup" (without vocal)
4. "Hakosora" (without vocal)

=== Mobile Suit Gundam 00 Voice Actor Single 2: Towa no Rasen/Answer ===
Second character CD, featuring Shinichiro Miki as Lockon Stratos. Music is done in collaboration with Eijun Suganami and Shinji Matsuda, members of THE BACK HORN. First press comes with a collaboration card and housed in a deluxe digipak case.

Catalog Number

VTCL-35039

Track listing

1. "Towa no Rasen" (永遠の螺旋; "Eternal Spiral")
2. "Answer"
3. "Towa no Rasen" (without Vocal)
4. "Answer" (without Vocal)

=== Mobile Suit Gundam 00 Voice Actor Single 3: Idea/Elephant ===
Third character CD, featuring Hiroshi Kamiya as Tieria Erde. Music is done in collaboration with Isamu Teshima, Unicorn's guitarist. First press comes with a collaboration card and housed in a deluxe digipak case.

Catalog Number

VTCL-35042

Track listing

1. "Idea"
2. "Elephant"
3. "Idea" (without Vocal)
4. "Elephant" (without Vocal)

=== Mobile Suit Gundam 00 Voice Actor Single 4: Taiyō/After Image ===
Fourth character CD, featuring Hiroyuki Yoshino as Allelujah Haptism. Music is done in collaboration with Chiaki Ishikawa. First press comes with a collaboration card and housed in a deluxe digipak case.

Catalog Number

VTCL-35041

Track listing

1. "Taiyō" (太陽; "Sun")
2. After Image
3. Taiyō (without Vocal)
4. After Image (without Vocal)

=== Mobile Suit Gundam 00 Voice Actor Single 5: Voice (Koko Kara Hajimaru Ai)/Paint the Sky ===
Fifth character CD, featuring Miyu Irino as Saji Crossroad. Music is done in collaboration with Deen. First press comes with a collaboration card and housed in a deluxe digipak case.

Catalog Number

VTCL-35056

Track listing

1. "Voice (Koko Kara Hajimaru Ai)" (VOICE～ここから始まる愛～; "Voice (Love that Starts from Here)")
2. Paint the Sky
3. "Voice (Koko Kara Hajimaru Ai)" (without Vocal)
4. Paint the Sky (without Vocal)

=== Mobile Suit Gundam 00 Voice Actor Single 6: Inori/Justice ===
Sixth character CD, featuring Ayahi Takagaki as Feldt Grace. Music is done in collaboration with Kokia. First press comes with a collaboration card and housed in a deluxe digipak case.

Catalog Number

VTCL-35059

Track listing

1. "Inori" (祈り†; "Prayer")
2. "Justice"
3. "Inori" (without Vocal)
4. "Justice" (without Vocal)

=== Mobile Suit Gundam 00 Voice Actor Single 7: Still More Ripple/Utsukushii Hero: Sayōnara no Humour ===
Seventh character CD, featuring Yuichi Nakamura as Graham Aker. Its soundtrack was composed by Yasunori Mitsuda. First press comes with a collaboration card and housed in a deluxe digipak case.

Catalog Number

VTCL-35059

Track listing

1. "Still More Ripple"
2. "Utsukushii Hello, Sayōnara no Humour" (美しいハロー さようならのユーモア; "Beautiful Hello, The Humour of a Farewell")
3. "Still More Ripple" (without Vocal)
4. "Utsukushii Hero, Sayōnara no Humour" (without Vocal)

== CD Drama Specials ==
=== CD Drama Special: Mobile Suit Gundam 00 Another Story MISSION-2306 ===
CD Drama Special: Mobile Suit Gundam 00 Another Story MISSION-2306

Studio album audio drama
- Released: July 23, 2008
- Genre: Drama
- Length: 58:39
- Labels: flying DOG / JVC Entertainment

A prequel drama CD. In this drama CD, Setsuna F Seiei is tasked with the mission of preventing an assassination of Barry Halevy, the leader of a fossil fuel export regulation watchdog group, and protecting his daughter, Louise Halevy from terrorist organizations. The story itself is a parody, framed as being a Veda simulation undertaken by Setsuna as part of his Gundam Meister training. After forcing an overtly bubbly fake persona, he is forced to call on the other Meisters in turn to help with his mission. This includes Tiera pretending to be a girl, Hallelujah acting as a delinquent and Lockon acting as his older brother. Graham is also featured as a homosexual teacher, with perverted tendencies towards his underage male students.

Catalog Number

VTCL-60063

Track listing

1. Briefing Room (ブリーフィングルーム )
2. Setsuna, Move in (刹那、転入する)
3. How Do You Do, Tieria (ごきげんよう、ティエリア)
4. Leader of Hoodlums (不良番長)
5. Intervention Begins (介入開始)
6. The Exposed Truth (暴かれた真実)
7. Goodbye, Mr. Ham (さよなら、ハム先生)
8. Ending Toll ~ VA's Comments (エンディング・ロール～声優コメント)
9. CD Drama Extra [Hallelujah's Day] (CDドラマエクストラ「ハレルヤの日」)

=== CD Drama Special 2: Mobile Suit Gundam 00 Another Story ROAD TO 2307 ===
CD Drama Special 2: Mobile Suit Gundam 00 Another Story ROAD TO 2307

Studio album audio drama
- Released: September 24, 2008
- Genre: Drama
- Length: 42:10
- Labels: flying DOG / JVC Entertainment

Second drama CD. This drama CD will focus on the Meisters, as well as the Union's story. Unlike the first prequel CD drama, the second will have a comparatively much more serious tone, with stories that link to the original TV series.

Catalog Number

VTCL-60076

Track listing

1. Meeting (出会い)
2. Meisters (マイスターズ)
3. Tieria's Defiance (ティエリアの挑戦)
4. Exia VS Virtue (エクシア VS ヴァーチェ)
5. 2 Years Later (2年後)
6. Graham Maneuver (グラハム・マニューバ)
7. The Notice from Howard (ハワードからの報せ)
8. Slature's Motive (スレーチャーの理由)
9. Mock Battle (模擬戦)
10. The Sky Waits for You (キミを待つ空)
11. Ending (エンディング)
