= High and Mighty Color discography =

- Studio albums: 5
- Compilation albums: 2
- Singles: 19
- Video albums: 2

This article contains the discography of Japanese rock band High and Mighty Color.

== Albums ==
=== Studio albums ===
Title	Album details	Peak chart positions	Sales
Title	Album details	JPN	Sales
Goover	Released: 14 September 2005; Format: CD	8	JPN: 67,088
Gō on Progressive	Released: 5 April 2006; Format: CD	7	JPN: 41,447
San	Released: 21 February 2007; Format: CD, CD+DVD	16	JPN: 15,264
Rock Pit	Released: 19 March 2008; Format: CD, CD+DVD	24	JPN: 12,563
Swamp Man	Released: 2 September 2009; Format: CD	45	JPN: 2,655

=== Compilation albums ===
Title	Album details	Peak chart positions	Sales
Title	Album details	JPN	Sales
10 Color Singles	Released: 26 December 2007; Format: CD, CD+DVD	34	JPN: 18,973
BEEEEEEST	Released: 26 November 2008; Format: CD, CD+DVD	42	

=== Video albums ===
Title	Details
VIDEO G∞VER	Released: 22 February 2006; Format: DVD
LIVE BEE LOUD ~THANKS GIVING~	Released: 28 January 2009; Format: DVD

== Singles ==
Title	Year	Peak chart positions	Sales	Album
Title	Year	JPN	Sales	Album
"Pride"	2005	2	JPN: 347,830	Goover
"Pride Remix"	2005	20	JPN: 18,527	Goover
"Over"	2005	11	JPN: 52,989	Goover
"Run Run Run"	2005	14	JPN: 27,340	Goover
"Days"	2005	22	JPN: 10,253	Goover
"Style ~Get Glory in This Hand~"	2005	19	JPN: 12,774	Gō on Progressive
"Ichirin no Hana"	2006	2	JPN: 184,562	Gō on Progressive
'"Dive into Yourself"	2006	24	JPN: 16,433	San
"Enrai ~Tooku ni Aru Akari~"	2006	15	JPN: 23,742	San
"Tadoritsuku Basho/Oxalis"	2007	18	JPN: 11,422	San
"Dreams"	2007	24	JPN: 8,000	10 Color Singles
"Amazing"	2007	30	JPN: 8,427	BEEEEEEST
"Flashback/Komorebi no Uta"	2008	39	JPN: 3,583	Rock Pit
"Hot Limit"	2008	20	JPN: 11,738	Non-album singles
"Remember"	2008	29	JPN: 4,270	Non-album singles
"XYZ"	2009	—		Swamp Man
"good bye"	2009	—		Swamp Man
"RED"	2009	—		Non-album singles
"Re:ache"	2010	—		Non-album singles
