= 10 Color Singles =

Compilation album by High and Mighty Color
- Released: December 26, 2007
- Genre: Rock
- Length: 52:40
- Label: SMEJ
- Producer: Hal

High and Mighty Color chronology
10 Color Singles (2007)	Beeeeeest (2008)

Singles from 10 Color Singles
- 1. "Dreams" Released: August 1, 2007

10 Color Singles is a compilation album released by High and Mighty Color on December 26, 2007. It comes in two editions, one featuring an additional DVD which contains most of the band's music videos.

== Overview ==
10 Color single is the first "best" album from the group, containing their first 10 singles. The album will also be released with a special edition of "Ichirin no Hana" and is expected to contain a music video for Mushroom, a b-side from the single Dreams.

== Promotion ==
To promote the album, a black van campaign was started. Information on where to purchase the album online and in person was posted on the side of a black van alongside the album's cover. The van drove through 10 cities for three weeks promoting the sale of the album, making its final stop in Okinawa on the day of the release.

== Track listing ==
All tracks are written by High and Mighty Color.

No.	Title	Original album	Length
1.	"Pride"	G∞ver	4:19
2.	"Over"	G∞ver	4:04
3.	"Run☆Run☆Run"	G∞ver	4:22
4.	"Days"	G∞ver	4:04
5.	"Style (Get Glory in This Hand)"	Gō on Progressive	4:16
6.	"Ichirin no Hana" (一輪の花; "One Lone Flower")	Gō on Progressive	3:42
7.	"Dive into Yourself"	San	3:51
8.	"Enrai (Tooku ni Aru Akari)" (遠雷 〜遠くにある明かり〜; "Distant Thunder (Light in the Distance)")	San	4:26
9.	"Tadoritsuku Basho" (辿り着く場所; "The Place Where We Arrive")	San	5:14
10.	"Okizarisu" (オキザリス; "Oxalis")	San	4:30
11.	"Dreams"	Previously unreleased	5:27
12.	"Ichirin no Hana" (Studio Live Version)	Previously unreleased	4:21
