= Best (High and Mighty Color album) =

Beeeeeest

Greatest hits album by High and Mighty Color
- Released: November 26, 2008
- Genre: Rock
- Length: 74:00
- Label: SMEJ
- Producer: Hal

High and Mighty Color chronology
10 Color Singles (2007)	Beeeeeest (2008)

Singles from Beeeeeest
- 1. "Amazing" Released: December 12, 2007; 2. "Remember" Released: October 15, 2008

BEEEEEEST is the final compilation album from the Japanese rock band HIGH and MIGHTY COLOR to feature Mākii, the lead female vocalist of the group.

== Overview ==
BEEEEEEST is the second "Best" album from the band, coming less than a year after their previous compilation album. The track list for the album was specifically chosen by fans through online voting. The album contains the a special DVD with the PVs for Amazing, Flashback, HOT LIMIT, and Remember, previously uncollected PVs. It will also feature the final concert to be held with Mākii in its entirety.

== Track listing ==
No.	Title	Length
1.	"Over" (~LIVE@OKINAWA MUSIC TOWN~)	4:31
2.	"Ichirin no Hana"	3:39
3.	"Dive into Yourself"	3:46
4.	"Pride"	4:19
5.	"Energy"	5:15
6.	"Here I Am"	4:40
7.	"Oxalis"	4:29
8.	"Remember"	4:39
9.	"Enrai (Tooku ni Aru Akari)"	4:23
10.	"Notice"	4:10
11.	"Humming bird"	4:24
12.	"Amazing"	3:46
13.	"For Dear..."	4:19
14.	"Mirror"	3:48
15.	"Toxic"	4:15
16.	"Hidden Track"	10:26

== Personnel ==
- Makii – vocals
- Yūsuke – vocals
- Kazuto – lead guitar
- Meg – rhythm guitar
- Mackaz – bass
- Sassy – drums

== Charts ==
Chart	Peak position
Oricon Weekly Albums	42
