= Video G∞ver =

VIDEO G∞VER

Video by High and Mighty Color
- Released: February 22, 2006
- Genre: Pop/rock
- Length: 35:00
- Label: SMEJ
- Producer: Hal

Video G∞ver is a High and Mighty Color video compilation released in 2006. It included the promotion videos for Pride, Over, Run Run Run and Days as well as advertising TV-spots for the individual Singles and alternate video versions. All four Songs were part of the Go Over album, released in 2005.

== Track list ==
1. Pride
2. Over
3. Run Run Run
4. Days
5. Pride TV-Spot
6. Over TV-Spot
7. Run Run Run TV-Spot
8. Days TV-Spot
9. Go over TV-Spot
10. Over – precious version
11. DAYS – director's cut
12. 2005.9.14 Put On Happiness – Opening Movie
