= Remember (High and Mighty Color song) =

Single by High and Mighty Color

from the album BEEEEEEST
- Released: October 15, 2008
- Genre: Alternative rock
- Length: 4:39
- Label: SMEJ
- Producer: Hal

High and Mighty Color singles chronology
"Hot Limit" (2008)	"Remember" (2008)	"XYZ" (2009)

Remember is the 14th single from the Japanese rock band, High and Mighty Color, and was released on October 15, 2008.

== Information ==
"Remember" is the final single to feature Mākii as a member of the band, as she is to leave from the band at the end of 2008. A preview of the title track was released on September 3 as part of an overhaul given to the official website. Filming for the music video of "Remember" began on September 1. The video was filmed within the span of two weeks on location in Guam. The music video was released exclusively on the M-ON music channel on September 28. The band's official website describes the B-side, "Hana Fubuki," as a touching ballad.

== Track listing ==
No.	Title	Length
1.	"Remember"	4:39
2.	"Hana Fubuki" (花ふぶき; "Flower Storm")	5:37
3.	"Pride" (Live Mix 2008)	4:39
4.	"Remember" (Instrumental)	4:39

== Oricon ==
Week #	Mon	Tue	Wed	Thu	Fri	Sat	Sun	Week Rank	Sales
Week 1	-	19	18	27	31	29	-	29	3,700
