= Hot Limit (song) =

1998 single by T.M. Revolution

Single by T.M. Revolution

from the album The Force
- B-side: "AquaLovers〜Deep into the night" "Hot Limit (Mitsuya-Mix)"
- Released: June 24, 1998
- Genre: J-pop
- Length: 3:47
- Label: Antinos Records
- Producer: Daisuke Asakura

T.M. Revolution singles chronology
"Aoi Hekireki 〜Jog edit〜" (1998)	"Hot Limit" (1998)	"Thunderbird" (1998)

Music videos
- "Hot Limit" on YouTube

"Hot Limit" is the eighth single from T.M. Revolution, Takanori Nishikawa’s solo project, released on June 24, 1998.

== Music video ==
The video for "Hot Limit" was filmed in Florida and features Nishikawa wearing a black outfit that contains straps on his upper body and legs and dances upon an orange star platform on the sea.

== Track listing ==
8cm single
No.	Title	Lyrics	Music	Arranger	Length
1.	"Hot Limit"	Akio Inoue	Daisuke Asakura	D. Asakura
2.	"AquaLovers〜Deep into the night"	A. Inoue	D. Asakura	D. Asakura
3.	"Hot Limit (Mitsuya-Mix)"	A. Inoue	D. Asakura	D. Asakura
Total length:					11:03

== Sales ==
"Hot Limit" sold more than 711,000 copies, and T.M.Revolution's official website stated that it is sold to a total of more than 900,000.

== Charts ==
1998 chart performance for "Hot Limit"
Chart (1998)	Peak position
Japan (Oricon)	1

2026 chart performance for "Hot Limit"
Chart (2026)	Peak position
Japan Combined Singles (Oricon)	21
Japan Hot 100 (Billboard)	8

Chart performance for "Hot Limit" (from The First Take)
Chart (2026)	Peak position
Japan Download Songs (Billboard Japan)	17
Japan Hot Shot Songs (Billboard Japan)	20

== Certifications ==
Country	Provider	Certifications
Japan	RIAJ	500,000

== High and Mighty Color version ==
"Hot Limit"

Single by High and Mighty Color
- Released: June 25, 2008
- Genre: Dance rock
- Label: SMEJ
- Producer: Hal

High and Mighty Color singles chronology
"Flashback/Komorebi no Uta" (2008)	"Hot Limit" (2008)	"Remember" (2008)

"Hot Limit" is the 13th single from the Japanese group HIGH and MIGHTY COLOR and was the first single after the release of their 4th album, Rock Pit. This was the second time the group has covered a song, the first being a cover of a Luna Sea song used for a special tribute cover album. The group's official website describes the title track as a fun summer anthem.

=== Information ===
"Hot Limit" was the second time the group was covered a song from another artist, the first being "Rosier", a song originally done by the band Luna Sea. Takanori Nishikawa appears in the promotional video for the single. A limited edition release of the single contains the promotional video for the single. The idea came to the group while on tour with Nishikawa's band, abingdon boys school. Maki is the lead vocalist for the title track of the single, stating that she wished to put her own original twist on a classic summer theme. On May 21 it was announced that three different versions of the song would be available through cell-phone purchase, a special HOT LIMIT introduction version, a Brilliant Summer version as well as a ring tone version of the song released through a QR Code posted on group's official website. Three more versions of the song were made available in ring tone format using a different QR Code posted on the group's official website. The music video for HOT LIMIT was released on May 26, 2008, exclusively on M-ON music channel. A Hot Limit Star Pencil marker will be packed with the special edition releases of the single.

The single's first day on the Oricon charts had it ranked at the #11 spot. This is the highest ranking day for a single from the group since 2006's Enrai ~Tooku ni Aru Akari~ which managed to reach the 9th spot on its third day. The single would go on to remain in the top 30 for the rest of the week and take a weekly ranking of #20, eliciting the best sales from a single or album from the group since Enrai's release. Due to news of Maki's departure, sales and downloads of the single were bolstered, pushing the single up as much as 10 spots on the Oricon chart.

==== Eurobeat mix ====
The single was later remixed and sold as a digital single known as HOT LIMIT -EUROBEAT MIX-, featuring a much more Eurobeat and dance style than that of the original single. A video was also released for the single that was released exclusively on SME websites.

=== Music video ===
The video for Hot Limit features Maki riding through an unnamed city on a motorcycle. She then joins the rest of the group atop a building and steps upon an orange star platform as the song beings and the group performs the song. The video is seen as both a standard video intertwined with behind the scenes footage of Nishikawa are shown as he directs the video. The style of the video was meant to mimic that of the original, including an orange star platform as well as Maki in an outfit similar to the original worn by Nishikawa along with the same dance used by in the original video.

=== Track listing ===
1. HOT LIMIT
2. KIRA KIRA Summer (キラキラSummer; Sparkle Summer)
3. MIRAA (ミラー; Mirror)
4. HOT LIMIT-Instrumental-

=== Sales ===
==== Oricon ====
Chart	Peak position
Oricon Daily Chart	11
Oricon Weekly Chart	20

Current total sales: 11,738

==== Japanese Digital Sales charts ====
Chart	Peak position
Recochoku Chaku-Uta Full	40
Recochoku Chaku-Uta All	71
Oricon Mobile Full-Song	12
Dwango Truetone Ringtones (Chaku Uta)	14

== John Desire version ==
"Hot Limit"
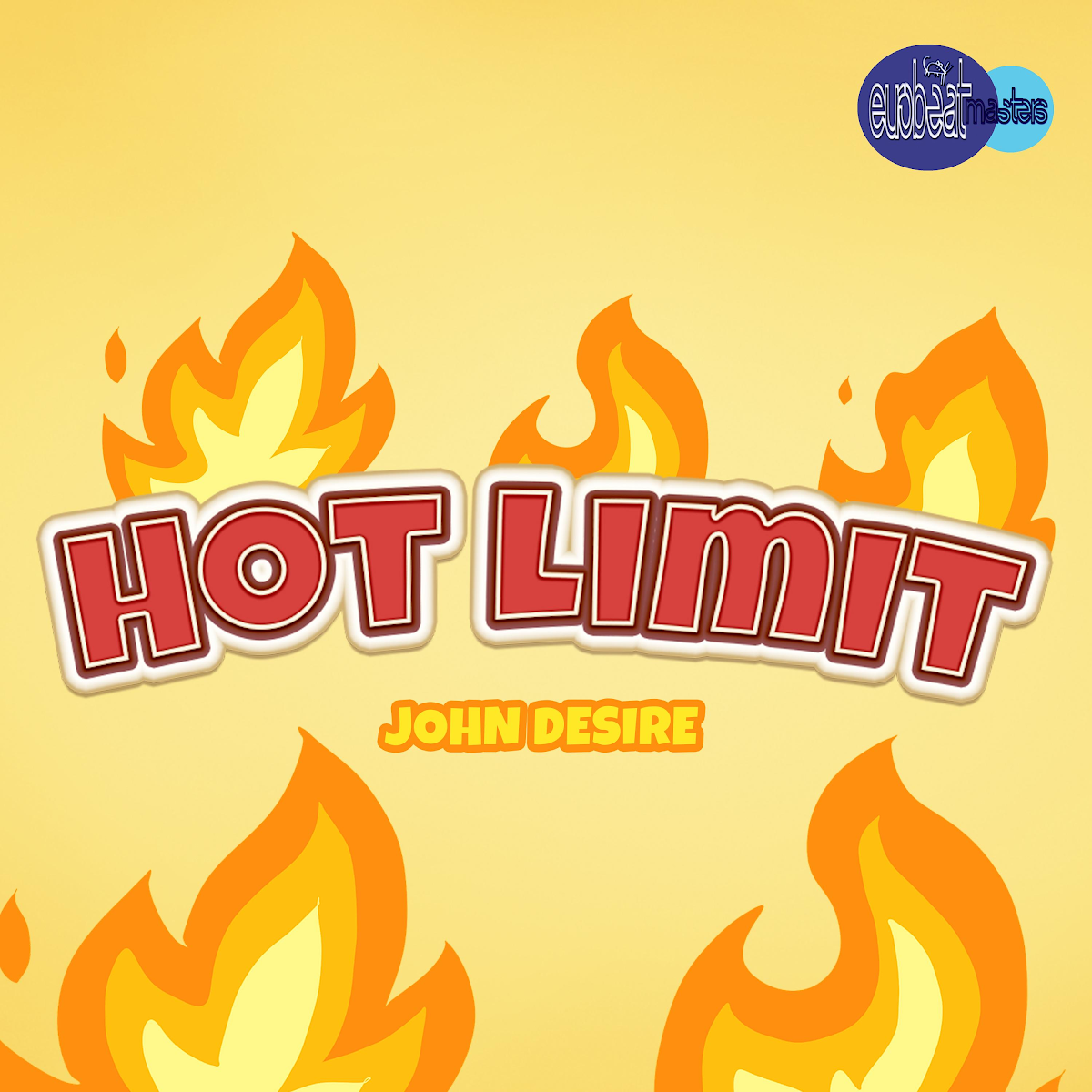

Single by John Desire

from the album Dancemania Presents J★Paradise
- Released: February 16, 2001
- Genre: Eurobeat
- Length: 5:06
- Label: Eurobeat Masters/LED Records
- Lyricist: Johnnie Fingers
- Producers: Davide Di Marcantonio; John Fireball

John Desire singles chronology
"Hot Limit" (2001)	"Midnight Radio" (2007)

"Hot Limit" is an English cover of T.M.Revolution song, performed by Davide Di Marcantonio as John Desire. It debuted in the album Dancemania Presents J★Paradise on February 16, 2001, then it was released as a digital single on May 17, 2008.

John Desire's version was featured in rhythm games such as Dance Dance Revolution 5thMIX and Dance Maniax 2ndMIX append JPARADISE.

=== Track listing ===
1. Hot Limit (Extended Mix)
2. Hot Limit (Radio Mix)
3. Hot Limit (Instrumental)
4. Hot Limit (Vox)
