= Dreams (High and Mighty Color song) =

Single by High and Mighty Color

from the album 10 Color Singles
- Released: August 1, 2007
- Recorded: Paramount studio
- Genre: Pop
- Length: 5:22
- Label: SMEJ
- Songwriter(s): Maakii, Yuusuke, Meg, Mackaz, Roxy
- Producer(s): Hal

High and Mighty Color singles chronology
"Tadoritsuku Basho/Oxalis" (2007)	"Dreams" (2007)	"Amazing" (2007)

"Dreams" is the tenth single by High and Mighty Color; it was released on August 1, 2007.

== Overview ==
"Dreams" is the first single from the band since January 2007 and their first since "Over" to contain more than one B-side. The title track of the single is used as the second ending theme for the anime Darker than Black and has been described as a ballad and about the sadness of breaking up. The first pressing of the single came with four exclusive character stickers from Darker than Black. The single is unlike any other single in the fact that rather than crediting "High and Mighty Color" for writing the lyrics and composing the music from Roxy production, "Dreams" gives the specifics for who wrote the lyrics on some of the songs. The single charted the 18th place on Oricon during its first day and would go on to obtain the 24th spot on the weekly charts.

== Music video ==
Released July 15, 2007, the music video for Dreams opens up to an unseen figure dropping a mass of broken crystal from her hands. Maki is then seen getting a hair cut as the song begins, with Yuusuke on a couch, singing in the background. Maki is then shown standing alone before showing up in a room with a large window. Yuusuke appears not too long after and he and Maki switch from standing in the background and foreground. As a myriad of bright hues cover the screen, Yuusuke and Maki are seen singing together in a white room, each facing away from the other. The girl dropping the broken crystals at the beginning of the video is then revealed to be Maki. During the bridge, other members of the band are seen playing their instruments in the room with one window, the edges of the screen are colored bright blue and yellow with shots of Maki's face interspersed. Yuusuke and Maki are then seen in the room once more before the screen returns to Maki singing by herself in the room with one window. Another quick shot of Makai and Yuusuke in the white room is shown for a few seconds before switching to Yuusuke singing alone in a room and the other members once again showing off their playing. Maki then returns to her hair cut and shots of her singing on a yellow tinted screen are interspersed at different times before the song and video ends on a close up of Maki.

== Track list ==
1. "Dreams" – 5:22
  1. Lyrics: Maakii & Yuusuke
  2. Music: HIGH and MIGHTY COLOR
2. "Feel Like Dance" – 4:19
  1. Lyrics: Maakii & Yuusuke
  2. Music: HIGH and MIGHTY COLOR
3. "Mushroom" (マッシュルーム) – 3:41
  1. Lyrics: MEG, mACKAz, & Yuusuke
  2. Music: MEG & Roxy Production
4. "Dreams (Instrumental)" – 5:22
  1. Music: MEG & Roxy Production

== Personnel ==
- Maakii & Yuusuke — vocals
- Kazuto — guitar
- Meg — guitar
- Mackaz — bass
- Sassy — drums

== Charts ==
Oricon Sales Chart (Japan)

Release	Chart	Peak position	First week sales	Total sales
2007	Oricon Daily Singles Chart	18		
2007	Oricon Weekly Singles Chart	24	5,126	8,000
