= List of number-one digital singles of 2017 (Japan) =

This is a list of songs that reached No. 1 on the Billboard Japan Top Download Songs Chart in Japan in 2017. Billboard Japan made this chart in October. Oricon also does a Download Songs Chart. Both charts are not exactly, but mostly the same. Chart of Billboard Japan is used here for convenience.

== Chart History ==
| Issue date | Song | Artist(s) | Ref |
|---|---|---|---|
| Oct. 9 | "Hero" | Namie Amuro | |
| Oct. 16 | "ASH" | LiSA | |
| Oct. 23 | "Hana no Uta" (花の唄) | Aimer | |
| Oct. 30 | "Hana no Uta" (花の唄) | Aimer | |
| Nov. 6 | "Kaze ni Fukarete mo" (風に吹かれても, Even If Blown by the Wind) | Keyakizaka46 | |
| Nov. 13 | "Haiiro to Ao" (灰色と青) | Kenshi Yonezu featuring Masaki Suda | |
| Nov. 20 | "Haiiro to Ao" (灰色と青) | Kenshi Yonezu featuring Masaki Suda | |
| Nov. 27 | "Invisible Sensation" | USG | |
| Dec. 4 | "fake town baby" | USG | |
| Dec. 11 | "Seiren'naru Heretics" (清廉なるHeretics) | Kegani featuring DracoVirgo | |
| Dec. 18 | "Anata" (あなた, You) | Hikaru Utada | |
| Dec. 25 | "Anata" (あなた, You) | Hikaru Utada | |
