= Swamp Man =

Studio album by High and Mighty Color
- Released: JPN September 2, 2009
- Genre: Alternative metal; post-hardcore
- Length: 40:18
- Label: JPN Spice Records
- Producer: High and Mighty Color

High and Mighty Color chronology
Rock Pit (2008)	Swamp Man (2009)

Singles from Swamp Man
- 1. "XYZ" Released: July 23, 2009; 2. "Good Bye" Released: July 29, 2009

Swamp Man is the fifth and final studio album by Japanese rock band High and Mighty Color. It was the first album to features new vocalist Halca. The album was released in Japan on September 2, 2009 with no physical singles released.

== Overview ==
Swamp Man is the first album to feature Halca as a vocalist after the departure of Mākii. It is also the band's last, as they disbanded almost a year later. Two digital singles were released prior to the release of the album: "XYZ" and "Good Bye" on iTunes in both Japan and the US. A PV for "Good Bye" was released on the band's official YouTube page on August 9, 2009. The album features a heavier sound compared to the band's previous albums.

The album debuted at #25 on the Oricon Charts.

== Track listing ==
All lyrics are written by Halca and Yuusuke

No.	Title	Music	Length
1.	"Swamp Man"	Meg	2:24
2.	"XYZ"	Mackaz	3:45
3.	"Good Bye"	Meg	4:14
4.	"Eyes"	Sassy	4:27
5.	"Fly Me to the Other Moon"	Kazuto	4:01
6.	"Pain"	Meg	4:22
7.	"7.2"	Meg	4:51
8.	"Hate"	Sassy	4:35
9.	"Living"	Sassy	3:38
10.	"You"	Kazuto	4:02

== Personnel ==
- Halca – vocals
- Yuusuke – vocals
- Meg – guitars
- Kazuto – guitars
- Sassy – drums
- Mackaz – bass

== Charts ==
Album - Oricon Sales Chart (Japan)

Release	Chart	Peak position	Sales total
2 September 2009	Oricon Daily Albums Chart	25	
2 September 2009	Oricon Weekly Albums Chart	45	2,655
