= Song day =

Song day may refer to:

- Songs Day, a Japanese festival
- River Đáy, a river of Vietnam
