= Ōkubo, Tokyo =

Neighborhood in Shinjuku, Tokyo, Japan

Ōkubo 大久保
- District
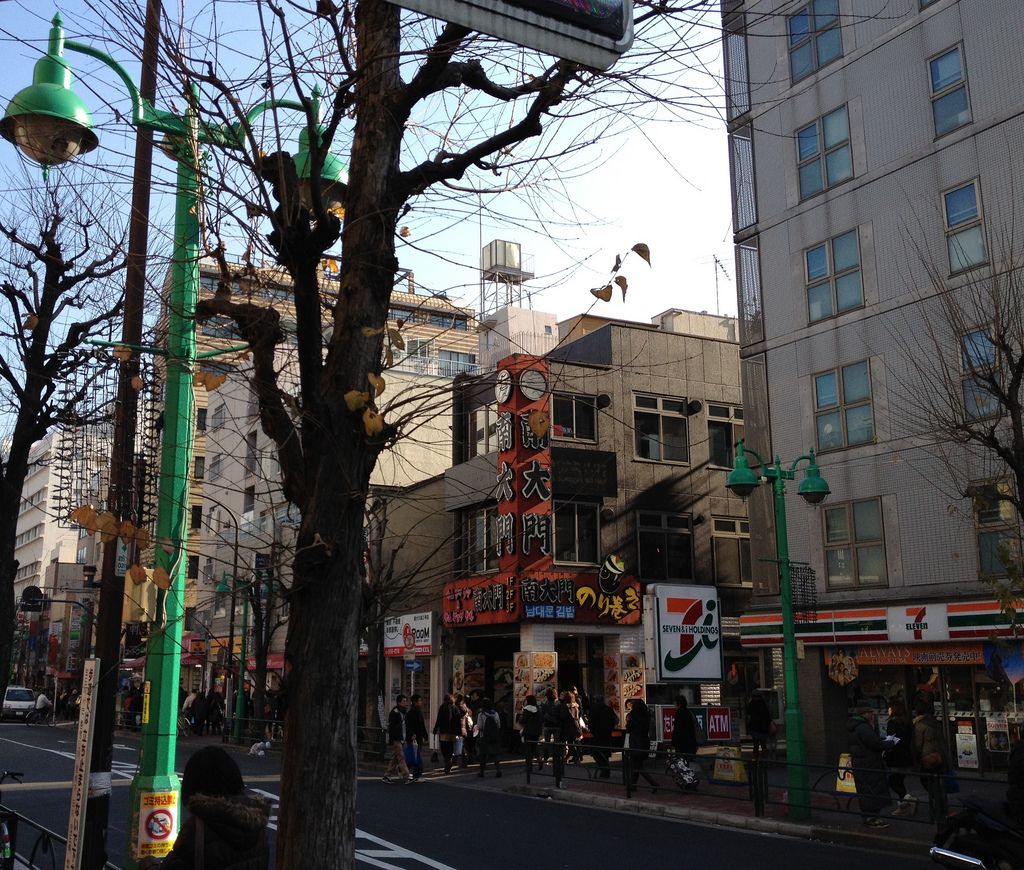
- Businesses in Ōkubo. The orange sign in the center is named for Namdaemun, a famous landmark in Seoul (2012)
- Interactive map of Ōkubo
- Coordinates: 35.701289°N 139.700049°E
- Country: Japan
- City: Tokyo Metropolis
- Ward: Shinjuku

Ōkubo (大久保), also known as Shin-Ōkubo (新大久保), is a neighborhood in Shinjuku, Tokyo, Japan. The neighborhood is built around Shin-Ōkubo Station, accessible on the Yamanote Line. It is known for its extensive Korean community, and is often called Tokyo Koreatown (Korean: 도쿄 한인촌).

Among Korean communities in Japan, Ōkubo is somewhat unique for hosting Koreans who arrived relatively recently, beginning around the 1980s. By contrast, many other Koreans in Japan arrived during or are descendants of people who went to Japan during the Japanese colonial period; these Koreans are called Zainichi Koreans. Business significantly increased after the rise of the Korean Wave beginning in the late 1990s. In recent years, the area has also attracted many Southeast Asian and Middle Eastern immigrants, with many international restaurants and stores opening up in the neighborhood as a result.

== History ==
=== Early history ===
Just after World War II, the area was considered a slum, and filled with unlicensed shacks. Its residents were then mostly Japanese; a small number of Korean and Chinese people lived there while working as laborers. Around the 1950s, after Zainichi Korean businessman Shin Kyuk-ho established a Lotte confectionary factory in the area, more Zainichis congregated in the area to work there.

In the early 1980s, after years of tense Japan-South Korean relations and thus limited immigration, Japan began allowing exchange students and more foreign workers due to a labor shortage. South Koreans began arriving in Japan and in Ōkubo around 1983. A larger number arrived beginning in the late 1980s, when South Korea lifted its restrictions on foreign travel. The good access to transportation and lower cost of rent in the area made it popular with immigrants.

After Japan privatized its national railway, the East Japan Railway Company purchased and renovated the slum. Some of the Korean residents used the money they received to establish businesses in the area.

=== Increasing Korean identity ===
It began to be significantly associated with Korea in the 1990s. Until the mid-1990s, there weren't many Korean businesses in the area. However, around 1995, there was a sudden increase in their quantity. Non-Korean visitors to the area spiked a number of times in the following years, following a number of Korean popular media booms in Japan. One such boom was around 2000, after the release of the action movie Shiri. Another boom occurred after the release of the 2002 drama Winter Sonata. The area came to be popularly called "Koreatown" around the time of the 2002 FIFA World Cup, which South Korea and Japan jointly hosted.

On January 26, 2001, a 26-year old South Korean man named Lee Soo-hyun and a Japanese man Shiro Sekine made headlines after they died while trying to rescue a drunk Japanese man who had fallen onto the tracks of Shin-Ōkubo Station. The pair were hailed as heroes in both Japan and South Korea. Lee's ancestors had previously worked as forced laborers in Japan during the colonial period, which contributed to Lee's public reputation of selflessness. Prime Ministers Yoshiro Mori and other government officials bowed at a memorial for Lee on January 29, 2001. Lee's life was semi-factually portrayed in a Japanese film entitled 26 Years Diary in 2007; the film was famously viewed by Emperor Akihito and Empress Michiko. Donations from both Japan and South Korea were sent in significant quantity to Lee's parents. They used the funds to create the Lee Soo-hyun Memorial Scholarship Foundation, which was to provide scholarships for students across Asia to study in Japan. By 2021, the fund had assisted 998 students.

=== Recent history ===
In 2011, the Federation of Korean Associations, Japan moved its headquarters from Shinjuku to Ōkubo.

The area has become a center for Japanese people interested in Korean culture. Lee Seung-min, chair of a Korean association in the area, World OKTA (Korean: 월드옥타), said in 2014 that his Korean language learning school had had more than 10,000 students since 1996.

After a controversial 2012 visit by South Korean president Lee Myung-bak to the contested Liancourt Rocks, there was a significant boycott of Korea-related businesses in Japan. The area was affected by these boycotts, and far-right Japanese nationalist groups participated in anti-Korean protests in the area. Korean businesses in the area reportedly almost halved in number around this time.

Around May 2013, it was reported that there were around 12,000 Korean residents in Shinjuku.

By 2018 restaurants of other ethnicities opened in Okubo; a concentration of them opened in "Muslim Town". There is also a "Little Chinatown".

In 2020, the area saw an increase in visitors after the success of the Korean drama Crash Landing on You. In 2022, it was reported that the area had fully recovered from the 2012 onwards drop in sales, and had even seen an increase in the number of Korea-related businesses.

== Economy ==
The nearby Shin-Ōkubo station receives significant foot traffic, which has boosted business in the area. In September 2022, it was reported that the station exceeds 100,000 visitors per day. The area had an estimated 9 million annual visitors by September 2022.

The restaurant chain Saikabo, founded by South Korean immigrants and which serves Korean food, was founded in the area in 1993, and has since expanded across Japan and internationally.

In 2013, it was reported that business in the area had doubled since 2008. In July 2013, the Korean Chamber of Commerce and Industry in Japan stated that Shin-Ōkubo had 500 businesses, including around 350 restaurants. By that year, the number of Korea-related businesses reportedly reached 628. In September 2022, it was reported that the number of Korea-related businesses in the area had increased from 396 in 2017 to 634 in 2022, around a 61% increase.
