= Style (Get Glory in This Hand) =

"Style ~Get Glory in This Hand~"

Single by High and Mighty Color

from the album Gō on Progressive
- Released: October 31, 2005
- Genre: Alternative rock
- Length: 9:29
- Label: SMEJ
- Songwriter(s): High and Mighty Color
- Producer(s): Hal

High and Mighty Color singles chronology
"Days" (2005)	"Style ~Get Glory in This Hand~" (2005)	"Ichirin no Hana" (2006)

"Style ~Get Glory in This Hand~" is a single released by High and Mighty Color on October 31, 2005, less than two months after the band's debut album Go Over.

== Track list ==
1. "STYLE ~get glory in this hand~" – 4:14
2. "energy" – 5:15

All songs written by HIGH and MIGHTY COLOR.

== Personnel ==
- Maakii & Yuusuke — vocals
- Kazuto — guitar
- MEG — guitar
- mACKAz — bass
- SASSY — drums

== Production ==
- Hide2 (Norishrocks) – creative & art direction
- Tsousie (Jetrock Graphics) – art direction & design
- Rocca Works – costume
- Eiji Tanaki (D&N Planning) – styling
- Keiko Nakatani (Mingle) – hair and make-up
- Atsushi Otaki (Ad Force), Masahiro Aoki (D&N Planning), Noriko Yamashita (SMC) & Kaori"Kacch" Nagai (Norishrocks) – products coordination

== Charts ==
Oricon Sales Chart (Japan)

Release	Chart	Peak position	Sales
9 November 2005	Oricon Weekly Singles Chart	19	12,774
