= Kariyushi58 =

- The group takes their name from the local Japanese National Route

Background information
- Also known as: かりゆし58
- Origin: Okinawa Prefecture, Japan
- Genres: Okinawan folk music; Rock; Reggae
- Years active: 2005-present
- Labels: LD&K Records; Pacific Records
- Website: kariyushi58.com

Kariyushi58 (かりゆし58, stylized as "kariyushi58" in English) is a Japanese four-man pop group formed in 2005, from Okinawa Prefecture, Japan, and headliner of the Utanohi music festival. The group consists of Maekawa Shingo (vocal and bass), Shinya Yukihiro (guitar), Nakamura Hiroki (drums), Miyahira Naoki (guitar).

Their sound contains many elements of traditional Okinawan folk music, Rock, and Reggae. The name is a portmanteau of the Okinawan かりゆし, meaning "harmony" or "happiness", and 58, the number of the local Japanese National Route.

== Members ==
Name	Date of birth
Maekawa Shingo (前川真悟, Shingo Maekawa)	July 13, 1981 (age 44)
Shinya Yukihiro (新屋行裕, Yukihiro Shinya)	August 18, 1981 (age 44)
Nakamura Hiroki (中村洋貴, Hiroki Nakamura)	August 2, 1981 (age 44)
Miyahira Naoki (宮平直樹, Naoki Miyahira)	February 26, 1982 (age 43)

== History ==
In April 2005, Shingo, Yukihiro, and Hiroki formed the group in the Okinawa Prefecture.

They made their official debut in February 2006 with the mini album, "Koibitoyo". Around the same year, they released a single called "Anma" in July 5 and August 13, which they would win the Japan Wired Grand Prix Rookie of the Year Award for it. On September 13, 2006, they released another mini album, "Ujinouta".

In April 2007, they released their "Toteto" EP. On October 23, 2007, the band released their first studio album, "Soro-Soro, Kariyushi"(そろそろ、かりゆし).

In 2008, Naoki joined the band as the guitarist.

== Discography ==
=== Albums ===
- Koibitiyo (2006)
- Ujinouta (2006)
- Deji, Kariyushi (2009)
- Kariyushi58BEST (2011)
- Go (2012)
- Hachi (2013)
- Daikinboshi (2014)
- Twushibyi, Kariyushi (2016)
- Kawariyoshi (2017)
- Bandwagon (2020)

== See also ==
- Okinawan music
- Music of Japan
