= Flashback/Komorebi no Uta =

"FLASHBACK/Komorebi no Uta"

Single by High and Mighty Color

from the album Rock Pit
- Released: February 27, 2008
- Genre: Alternative rock; pop rock
- Length: 4:39 ("Flashback"); 3:44 ("Komorebi no Uta")
- Label: SME Records
- Producer: Hal

High and Mighty Color singles chronology
"Amazing" (2007)	"FLASHBACK/Komorebi no Uta" (2008)	"Hot Limit" (2008)

"Flashback/Komorebi no Uta" (フラッシュバック／木漏レビノ歌, Furasshubakku/Komorebi no Uta) is the 12th single from the Japanese band High and Mighty Color. It is the band's second double-a side single.

== Information ==
This is the 12th single from the Japanese band, High and Mighty Color. Flashback was used as the second opening theme to TV Tokyo anime Hero Tales while Komorebi no Uta was used as the ending theme to the same anime. Komorebi no Uta began airing on January 6, 2008, while Flashback was used as the second opening theme to the anime later that month. The songs are described on the site as containing both a rock edge and a ballad sound. However, the single is recorded to gain the lowest selling from the band.

== Track list ==
No.	Title	Length
1.	"Flashback" (フラッシュバック; "Furasshubakku")	4:39
2.	"Komorebi no Uta" (木漏レビノ歌; "Song of Filtering Trees")	3:44
3.	"Flashback" (Instrumental)	4:39
4.	"Komorebi no Uta" (Instrumental)	3:44

== Charts ==
Chart (2008)	Peak position	First week sales
Oricon Daily Singles Chart	24	
Oricon Weekly Singles Chart	39	3,389

=== Flashback/Komorebi no Uta airplay rankings ===
Chart	Peak position
CDTV Top 100	49
ZIP FM Hot 100 (Nagoya)	37
