= 2side1brain =

Japanese post-hardcore group

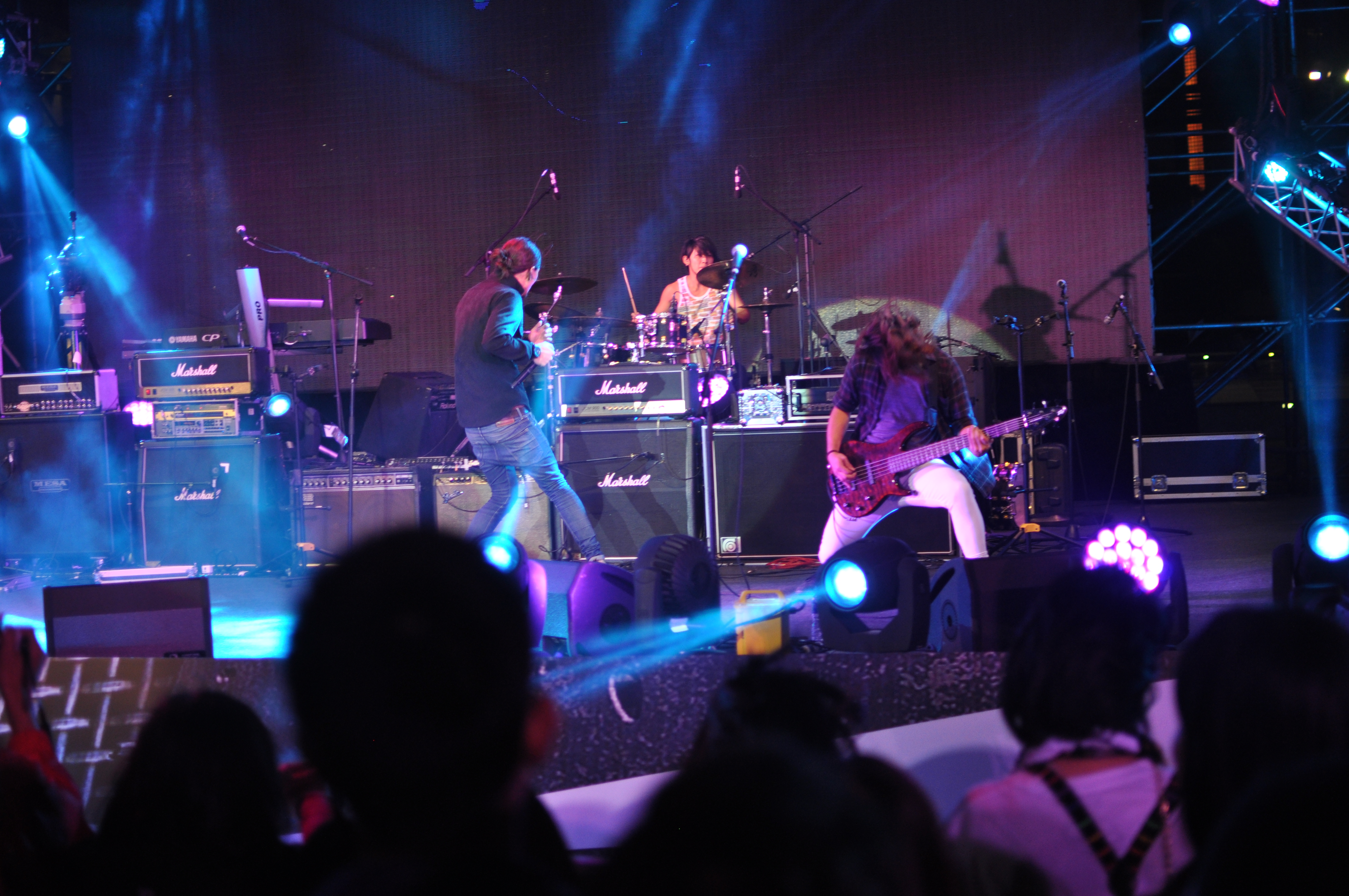
- 2side1brian performing in 2014

Background information
- Origin: Okinawa, Japan
- Genres: Post-hardcore; Screamo
- Years active: 2004–present
- Label: BORNtoLOVE Records
- Members: Shuntaro; Meg
- Past members: Shoichi; Narito
- Website: 2side1brain.net

2side1brain (ツーサイドワンブレイン; stylized as 2side1BRAIN) is a Japanese post-hardcore group from Okinawa Prefecture, Japan, and a headliner of the Utanohi music festival. They currently signed to an Independent record label, BORNtoLOVE Records, which is owned by the members of 2side1brain. They released their first album "Singing Like Flood" on August 20, 2008 and their second album "Wake Up My Emerald" on November 24, 2010. Their upcoming third studio album, "Blood Red Eyes" was released on August 15, 2012.

== Discography ==
=== Studio albums ===
Title	Release date	Label
Singing Like Flood	August 20, 2008	Rockachrome Records
Wake Up My Emerald	November 24, 2010	BORNtoLOVE Records
Blood Red Eyes	August 15, 2012	BORNtoLOVE Records

=== EPs ===
Title	Release date	Label
Pray For You	June 20, 2010	BORNtoLOVE Records

== Videography ==
=== Music videos ===
- "Wake Up My Emerald"
- "Pray For You"
- "You Are Beautiful"
- “Under the winter sky”

== See also ==
- Okinawan music
- Music of Japan
