= Hero Tales =

Japanese media project by Huang Jin Zhou

- First tankōbon volume cover

獣神演武 (Jūshin Enbu)
- Genre: Adventure; Historical fantasy; Martial arts
- Manga
- Written by: Huang Jin Zhou
- Illustrated by: Hiromu Arakawa
- Published by: Square Enix
- English publisher: NA: Yen Press
- Magazine: Gangan Powered; (October 21, 2006 – February 21, 2009); Monthly Shōnen Gangan; (May 12, 2009 – August 12, 2010)
- English magazine: US: Yen Plus
- Original run: October 21, 2006 – August 12, 2010
- Volumes: 5
- Anime television series
- Directed by: Osamu Sekita
- Produced by: Fukashi Azuma; Shinsaku Tanaka; Muneyuki Kanbe
- Written by: Mayori Sekijima
- Music by: Tamiya Terashima
- Studio: Studio Flag
- Licensed by: Crunchyroll
- Original network: TXN (TV Tokyo)
- English network: US: Funimation Channel
- Original run: October 8, 2007 – March 31, 2008
- Episodes: 26
- icon

Hero Tales (Japanese: 獣神演武, Hepburn: Jūshin Enbu; lit. 'Beast God Martial Arts') is a Japanese manga and anime series created by Huang Jin Zhou, a unit composed of Hiromu Arakawa, Genco, and Studio Flag. The manga series, illustrated by Arakawa, was serialized in Square Enix's Gangan Powered (2006–2009) and Monthly Shōnen Gangan (2009–2010), with its chapters collected in five tankōbon volumes. The series's setting is rooted in Chinese folklore and focuses on the young Taitou, who embarks on a journey with his allies to fulfill his destiny as the seventh star of the Hokuto. His mission is to recover a cursed sword and defeat the oppressive forces of the ruling empire. The manga was licensed for an English release in North America by Yen Press.

The concept originated from a web novel written by Shinya Ohara. Ohara affiliated with Studio Flag to produce an anime project, which eventually resulted in a 26-episode television series broadcast on TV Tokyo from 2007 to 2008. Funimation licensed it for an English release in North America. A video game for the Nintendo DS by D3 Publisher was released in Japan in November 2007.

Although the Hero Tales manga was well-received for its characters, art style, and fight scenes, various critics believed the story was typical, especially compared to Arakawa's previous work, Fullmetal Alchemist. The anime series received less favorable reviews due to pacing issues and a lack of depth, though it was still praised for its fight scenes, particularly in the second half.

== Plot ==
During his coming-of-age ceremony, Taitou, a young man who resents the ruling empire, is given the Kenkaranpu, a legendary conqueror's sword. A man named Shimei steals the sword after revealing Taitou's connection to Hagun, one of the Hokushin-Tenkun, celestial beings of great power. Determined to reclaim the Kenkaranpu, Taitou sets out, accompanied by the monk Ryuukou and his sister Laila.

In the jorney Ryuukou attempts to teach Taitou to control his ki, the energy tied to his star. Taitou learns that Laila enlisted the help of Koyou, a flamboyant ship captain. Taitou confronts Ryuukou about hiding his identity as another Hokushin-Tenkun—Bukyoku, the star neighboring Hagun. Shimei delivers the Kenkaranpu to the shogun, Keirou Hakuhou, who is revealed to be the incarnation of Tonrou, another celestial star. The seven stars of the Big Dipper will take human form during a crisis. Among them, Hagun (Taitou) and Tonrou (Keirou) are destined as the Noble Spirits, fated to clash for control of the empire. While Keirou embraces this prophecy, seeking to reshape the corrupt empire through force, Taitou rejects predestination, choosing to defy fate. The other stars include Ryuukou; Hosei, a warrior trained in the prophecy's lore; Koyou, a compassionate ship captain; Rinmei, a volatile woman devoted to Ryuukou; and Shoukakou, a shadowy figure in the capital whose loyalties remain unclear.

During a fight with Kourei's forces, Taito's group is overpowered and Ryuko sacrifices himself to let his friends escape. In the aftermath, Laila's father is killed and is shocked to learn about Taitou not being her brother and the main cause behind her father's death. Ryuukou joins the Keirou but is unwilling to kill his friends. Driven with guilt over his lost friends and family, Taitou is confronted by an angered Laila. The two make peace when Taitou realizes he can still protect Laila. Driven guilty by his actions, Ryuukou decides to atone by joining Taitou after Rinmei is revealed to be pregnant with his child.

In the final fight against the empire, Housei dies when slicing Shimei's body in pieces. However, Shimei is revealed to be a sword that takes control of human bodies, and takes Housei as his new vessel. After Laila manages to destroy the Housei sword, Taitou and Ryuukou confront Keirou together. Ryuukou loses an eye when defending his friend, who releases his full ki and destroys the temple, seemingly dying. Seven years later, a reformed empire is created, while Ryuukou has become a family man. Laila, now the new leader of her village, meets her adoptive brother again, who returns home with multiple wounds.

== Production ==
Ideas for Hero Tales originated in 1998 when Shinya Ohara wrote a web novel, titled Shishi Jūshin Enbu (獅子獣神演武; lit. 'Lion Beast-God Martial Arts'), on a website for wuxia literature. Hiromu Arakawa, who had not yet made her professional debut, was commissioned to create illustrations for the work, which stemmed from their shared connection to the Records of the Three Kingdoms fan circles. Ohara was affiliated with Studio Flag, and he and the studio's president, Tetsuya Hayasaka, attempted to produce an initial anime adaptation of his work. However, the project was eventually shelved, partly due to Arakawa's eventual professional manga debut. In 2005, the anime project was set in motion once again, produced by Genco, with a manga version, illustrated by Arakawa, beginning serialization in October 2006. Arakawa had only conceptualized the designs for the upcoming anime, but she ended up illustrating the manga as well. Huang Jin Zhou—a unit composed of Arakawa, Genco, and Studio Flag—is credited as the original creator of the work. Arakawa herself, however, has referred to Huang Jin Zhou as an acquaintance, implying they are a separate person.

For the anime series, Kenichi Suzumura voiced the main character, Taitou, whom he regarded as a wild, animal-like figure in an epic story intended to confront Keirou, whom he considered stronger. Banjō Ginga voiced Keirou, aiming to perform the role dynamically. Laila was voiced by Akemi Kanda, who praised the series's production values and setting for lending the anime notable depth. Other cast members included Takahiro Sakurai (Ryuko), who enjoyed the cast and production values and viewed his character as a dignified man, Rikiya Koyama as Koyou, and Shō Hayami as Shōkaku.

== Characters ==
Main cast, as seen in the manga series, including (from left to right): Laila, Taito, and Rinmei (front); Housei and Ryuko (behind); Shoukakou and Koyou (background)

=== The Two Celestial Deities ===
Taitou Shirei (岱燈 獅麗, Taitō Shirei)
Voiced by: Kenichi Suzumura (Japanese); Newton Pittman (English)
A skilled but reckless 16-year-old fighter who opposes corrupt authorities to protect others. His adoptive sister Laila can calm his violent outbursts as their relationship develops beyond sibling bonds. Marked with the Hokushin-Tenkun mark Hagun (破軍), symbol of the war god Alkaid, he belongs to the Seiryutō (青龍党; 'Blue Dragon Group'), law enforcement group until its near-destruction by General Keirou forces him to train for vengeance. The sacred Kenkaranpu (賢嘉爛舞) sword becomes his objective after being stolen—by Shimei in the manga and Keirou in the anime. Taitou later discovers he is the emperor's exiled elder brother, separated due to his divine Hagun birthmark.
Keirou (慶狼, Keirō)
Voiced by: Banjō Ginga (Japanese); Brian Mathis (English)
A 35-year-old general of the imperial army and leader of the Black Wolf Party. Marked with the Hokushin-Tenkun symbol of Tonrou (貪狼, Tonrō) on his left shoulder, he is the incarnation of the war god Dubhe and seeks to claim the throne of the Ken Empire. In his pursuit of power, he assaults Lotus Temple with his forces to seize the sacred Kenkaranpu sword, said to grant its wielder the right to rule. The attack results in the deaths of numerous monks and Seiryutō members. While both the anime and manga depict Keirou slaughtering the empire's populace, their motivations differ: in the manga, he acts on a prophecy demanding mankind's extinction, whereas the anime portrays him as a demonic figure who rejects human morality entirely.

=== The Five Divine Warriors ===
Ryuukou Mouten (劉煌 孟甜, Ryūkō Mōten)
Voiced by: Takahiro Sakurai (Japanese); John Burgmeier (English)
An 18-year-old warrior bearing the Bukyoku (武曲; Mizar) mark on his right pectoral. Skilled with a staff, he is the adopted son of Ryuushou Moukan, a master from another temple of the Rikka Sect. Though originally named Keikō, he is later revealed to be the biological son of Keirou. A serious and self-disciplined individual, Ryuukou struggles with poor sense of direction and harbors romantic feelings for Rinmei. During a confrontation with Keirou, Ryuukou fights to buy time for Taitou to escape. However, he later shifts allegiance from Taitou to Keirou, supporting his father's bid for the throne. When Keirou doubts his loyalty, Ryuukou is forced to execute his adoptive father, Moukan, plunging him into despair.
Housei Meitoku (鳳星 銘徳, Hōsei Meitoku)
Voiced by: Yūki Tai (Japanese); Josh Grelle (English)
A 17-year-old warrior bearing the Rokuson (禄存; Phecda) mark on the back of his right hand. A skilled archer with a carefree and impulsive personality, he wields the Soutenkyuu—a bladed bow that can separate into twin swords. He develops romantic feelings for Laila during their adventures. In the manga's continuity, Housei becomes Taitou's primary ally after Ryuukou's apparent betrayal. He eventually defeats Shimei in battle but sustains fatal wounds. After his death, Shimei reanimates his corpse, forcing Laila to destroy it in self-defense. She continues to honor his memory years later by wearing his necklace and visiting his grave.
The anime presents an alternate fate where Housei survives the conflict with Shimei. In this version, he witnesses Taitou's final battle with Keirou and is later shown stargazing with Laila in their village.
Koyou Mougai (虎楊 蒙骸)
Voiced by: Rikiya Koyama (Japanese); Jonathan Brooks (English)
The 22-year-old bearer of the Monkoku (文曲; Merak) mark at his neck. The leader of a group of sea bandits. Although a big, lively and rough person, he has skillful fingers and has interest in cooking and make-up. He wields an eight-section staff. He also seems to have a paralyzing fear of heights.
Shoukaku Chōyō (将鶴 張楊, Shōkaku Chōyō)
Voiced by: Sho Hayami (Japanese); J. Michael Tatum (English)
The 24-year-old bearer of the Renjou (廉貞, Renjō; Alioth) mark at his right palm. He serves as Taigatei's tutor and chief strategist for the Ken Empire. Though typically composed and mild-mannered, he is a ruthless pragmatist who prioritizes the empire's survival above all else. His right palm bears the Renjou mark, signifying his celestial affiliation.
The anime portrays Shoukaku as terminally ill and resigned to his impending death. In the manga, his motivations differ—viewing both the Hagun and Tonrou bearers as existential threats to humanity, he maneuvers secretly to preserve peace.
Rinmei Shokan (麟盟 詔韓)
Voiced by: Yuko Kaida (Japanese); Colleen Clinkenbeard (English)
The 20-year-old bearer of the Komon (巨門; Megrez) mark at her right thigh. She harbors feelings for Ryuukou but struggles with his withdrawn nature. She serves as a cook at his temple. Self-conscious about appearing older than she is, she has a fearsome temper when provoked. While the anime depicts her fighting alongside Ryuukou in the final conflict, the manga reveals she remains behind due to her pregnancy with his child.

=== Others ===
Laila Seiren (頼羅 青蓮)
Voiced by: Akemi Kanda (Japanese); Alexis Tipton (English)
a 14-year-old girl and Taitou's adoptive younger sister, the daughter of Souei, leader of the Seiryutō. Though frequently quarreling with Taitou—often prevailing—she remains the only one capable of restraining his recklessness. After her father's death, she briefly blames Taitou for the surrounding tragedies, influenced by Shimei's manipulations, before recognizing his innocence. In a pivotal confrontation, she battles Shimei after he reanimates Housei's corpse, during which she discovers her lineage as a descendant of the ancient shamans who controlled the stars—the source of her power over Taitou. Using this ability, she ultimately defeats Shimei. Following these events, she assumes leadership of her village, succeeding her father.
Taigatei (汰臥帝)
Voiced by: Jun Fukuyama (Japanese); Joel McDonald (English)
The 16-year-old Emperor of the Ken Empire. Good-hearted and has no self thought. He would like to change the Empire into a better place, yet he does not have much power - in reality members of his court govern the Empire. He and Taitou are twins, with Taigatei being the younger brother. The brothers were separated when they were about three, but while Taitou remembers that he was taken away from his original parents and brother, neither he nor Taigatei are aware of their relationship until others reveal it to them. He promises to Taitou to become a good Emperor who helps the people of his empire.
Shimei (史明)
Voiced by: Issei Futamata (Japanese); Mark Stoddard (English)
A follower of Keirou. One of the primary antagonists, he is a sorcerer who manipulates many people from behind the scenes all for the purpose of seeing "people die". He holds the demon sword of all seeing eye, Banshoushimei (萬詳史明) and is able to use spells. "Shimei" is who ever holds the Banshoushimei. He has had three separate bodies in the manga. He possesses the body of Housei Meitoku in an attempt to kill Laila Seiren and take her body, but Laila destroys him for good, cutting the Banshoushimei in half.
Souei (曹栄, Sōei)
Voiced by: Takayuki Sugō (Japanese); Charlie Campbell (English)
Taitou's and Laila's father. A former member of the Imperial Army, now leader of Seiryutou. After having roamed the Empire, his master Sonnei asked him to settle down at Lotus Temple. He is killed by Shimei.
Sonnei (孫寧)
Voiced by: Kenichi Ogata (Japanese); Grant James (English)
The elderly High priest of Lotus Temple (the headquarters of the Rikka Sect (六伽宗, Rikka Shū)), and former master of Souei. A master of the gaiden (外伝法) technique who is well known in the Empire. Has a weakness for women.
Kōchō (孔凋)
Voiced by: Fumihiko Tachiki (Japanese); Chris Rager (English)
A subordinate of Keirou. A quiet and unsociable person. In the anime, he is Taki's real father, and is killed while protecting Taki and Taigatei from Keirou. In the manga, he survives.
Taki (侘姫)
Voiced by: Fumiko Orikasa (Japanese); Jad Saxton (English)
Keirou's adopted daughter who entered the Court as a princess candidate. A quiet and sweet-natured girl. She and Taigatei are in love and they eventually marry.
Choka (趙香)
Voiced by: Junko Kitanishi (Japanese); Stephanie Young (English)
Originally from a foreign country but stowaway to the Ken Empire. She was then picked up by Keirou and now serves him loyally. Now a court lady attached to the Emperor where she guides the weak-willed Emperor to follow Keirou's wishes. She distrusts Ryuukou and Shōkaku, despite their claims to serve Keirou. In the anime, Shōkaku deducts, apparently correctly, that she is in love with Keirou.
Koei (紅英)
Voiced by: Atsuko Tanaka (Japanese); Jennifer Seman (English)
Koei is Housei's mentor and later instructs Taitou in the dual disciplines of Soukihō: Gaiden (focused on weaponry) and Naiden (devoted to physical enhancement). A profoundly erudite scholar, she meets her end in a clash with Shimei, who refers to her by the honorific Chisenkyū (智泉玖), hinting at their shared history. Their connection runs deeper; prior to inhabiting his current form, Shimei once possessed a female host under whom Koei studied, and had previously attempted to kill her during that time.

== Media ==
=== Manga ===
Authored by Huang Jin Zhou (a unit composed of Hiromu Arakawa, Genco, and Studio Flag), and illustrated by Arakawa, Hero Tales was serialized in Square Enix's Gangan Powered from October 21, 2006, to February 21, 2009. It was later transferred to Monthly Shōnen Gangan, where it ran from May 12, 2009, to August 12, 2010. Square Enix collected its chapters in five tankōbon volumes, released from August 11, 2007, to November 22, 2010.

In North America, the manga was licensed for English release by Yen Press. The five volumes were released from October 27, 2009, to October 25, 2011. It was also serialized in Yen Plus, starting in the February 2009 issue.

==== Volumes ====
No.	Original release date	Original ISBN	English release date	English ISBN
1	August 11, 2007	978-4-7575-2065-3	October 27, 2009	978-0-7595-3116-1
01. Hagun Roars (破軍吼ゆる); 02. It Rains (雨降りて..., Ame Ori Te...); 03. Night of Falling Stars (星の降る夜, Hoshi no Furu Yoru)
2	January 22, 2008	978-4-7575-2208-4	February 23, 2010	978-0-7595-3117-8
04. Wolf's Shadow (狼の影, Ōkami no Kage); 05. Ephemeral (うたかた, Utakata); 06. Starry Night (そこにある闇, Sokoniaru Yami); 07. Planning Mischief... (蠢動せし..., Shundō Seshi...)
3	September 22, 2008	978-4-7575-2325-8	June 15, 2010	978-0-316-08501-4
08. Jaw of the Wolf (月狼の贄, Tsuki Ōkami no Ago); 09. Jaw's Night (贄の夜, Nie no Yoru); 10. Separated People (うしなわれしものたち, Ushinawa Reshimono Tachi); 11. Black Dragon (黒き龍, Kuroki Ryū)
4	June 22, 2009	978-4-7575-2581-8	October 26, 2010	978-0-316-08502-1
12. [untitled]; 13. People Made Anew (新たなる者, Arata Naru Mono); 14. Falling Feathers (散ル羽根落布, Chiru Hane Rakufu); 15. Arika (在処)
5	November 22, 2010	978-4-7575-3055-3	October 25, 2011	978-0-316-17819-8
16. "The Source of a Whirl" (根源の渦, Kongen no Uzu); 17. Tagatameno (誰がための。。。); 18. "Precious Feelings" (尊き思い, Tattoki Omoi); 19. "The Time of the Reunion" (サイカイの刻, Saikai no Toki); 20. Kanawanu Negai Todokanu Omoi (叶わぬ願い 届かぬ思い); 21. "The Final Battle" (演武の果て, Enbu no Hate)

=== Anime ===
A 26-episode anime television series, produced by Studio Flag, directed by Osamu Sekita, with original character designs by Hiromu Arakawa, and titled in Japan as Jūshin Enbu: Hero Tales (獣神演武 -HERO TALES-), was broadcast on TV Tokyo from October 8, 2007, to March 31, 2008. (Note: TV Tokyo listed the series air dates on Sunday at 26:00, which is effectively Monday at 2:00 a.m. JST) The first opening theme is "Winterlong", performed by Beat Crusaders, and the first ending theme is "Kakegae no nai Hito e" (かけがえのない人へ; lit. 'To Someone Irreplaceable'), performed by Mai Hoshimura. The second opening and ending themes are "Flashback" (フラッシュバック, Furasshubakku) and "Komorebi no Uta" (木漏レビノ歌; lit. 'The Song of the Sunbeams Filtering Through the Trees'), respectively, both performed by High and Mighty Color. Media Factory collected the episodes into nine DVD volumes, which were released from January 25 to September 25, 2008. Two soundtrack CDs, featuring the music composed by Tamiya Terashima, were released on January 30 and March 26, 2008. Two drama CDs were released on February 27 and March 26, 2008.

In North America, Funimation announced that it had licensed the series in January 2010. The company collected the episodes in two DVDs, released on April 5, 2011. The series premiered on Funimation Channel on May 17, 2011. The series was added to Crunchyroll's catalog in September 2017.

==== Episodes ====
No.	Title (Note: All English titles taken from Funimation's release)	Original release date
1	"Alkaid Roars"; Transliteration: "Hagun Hoyuru Toki" (Japanese: 破軍吼ゆる刻)	October 8, 2007
2	"The Karma of Mizar"; Transliteration: "Bukyoku no Sadame" (Japanese: 武曲の宿業(さだめ))	October 15, 2007
3	"The Pledge of Energy Manipulation"; Transliteration: "Sōki no Chigiri" (Japanese: 操気の契り)	October 22, 2007
4	"Divine Warrior"; Transliteration: "Goshintōshi" (Japanese: 五神闘士)	October 29, 2007
5	"Ailing Empire"; Transliteration: "Yamishi Teikoku" (Japanese: 病みし帝国)	November 5, 2007
6	"The Red Champion"; Transliteration: "Akaki Eiketsu" (Japanese: 紅き英傑)	November 12, 2007
7	"Sorrowful Phecda"; Transliteration: "Kanashimi no Rokuzon" (Japanese: 悲しみの禄存)	November 19, 2007
8	"What Echoes in the Gorge"; Transliteration: "Keikoku ni Kodamasuru wa…" (Japanese: 渓谷に木霊するは…)	November 26, 2007
9	"Shadow on the Imperial Capital"; Transliteration: "Teito ni Sasukage" (Japanese: 帝都にさす影)	December 3, 2007
10	"The Lonely Emperor"; Transliteration: "Kodokunaru Koutei" (Japanese: 孤独なる皇帝)	December 10, 2007
11	"The Tale of the Big Dipper"; Transliteration: "Hokushinkiki" (Japanese: 北辰紀記)	December 17, 2007
12	"A Glimmer in the Moonlight"; Transliteration: "Gekka no Kirameki" (Japanese: 月下の煌き)	December 24, 2007
13	"The Two Celestial Deities"; Transliteration: "Ni Tenjin Mikoto" (Japanese: 二天神尊)	December 31, 2007
14	"The Dou Ya Changes Course"; Transliteration: "Tōki Kaitō" (Japanese: 闘牙回頭)	January 7, 2008
15	"Alkaid's Guidepost"; Transliteration: "hagun no douhyou" (Japanese: 破軍の道標)	January 14, 2008
16	"Dubhe, Devourer of the Heavens"; Transliteration: "Ama Hamu Tonrō" (Japanese: 天(あま)食む貪狼)	January 21, 2008
17	"The Father-Son Bond"; Transliteration: "Fushi no Kizuna" (Japanese: 父子の絆)	January 28, 2008
18	"Lian Tong Temple Ablaze"; Transliteration: "Rentsūji Enjō" (Japanese: 蓮通寺炎上)	January 4, 2008
19	"Stars Divided"; Transliteration: "Wakatareshi Hoshi" (Japanese: わかたれし星)	February 11, 2008
20	"The Turmoil Begins"; Transliteration: "Dōran no Makuake" (Japanese: 動乱の幕開け)	February 18, 2008
21	"A Commoner Infuriated"; Transliteration: "Hifun no Hakui" (Japanese: 悲憤の白衣)	February 25, 2008
22	"The Imperial Capital in Confusion"; Transliteration: "Teito Sakusō" (Japanese: 帝都錯綜(さくそう))	March 3, 2008
23	"Clash"; Transliteration: "Gekitotsu" (Japanese: 激突)	March 10, 2008
24	"Karma Out of Control"; Transliteration: "Bōsōseshi Shukugō" (Japanese: 暴走せし宿業)	March 17, 2008
25	"The Dubhe God"; Transliteration: "Donrōshin" (Japanese: 貪狼神)	March 24, 2008
26	"The End of the Tale"; Transliteration: "Enbu no Hate" (Japanese: 演武の果て)	March 31, 2008

=== Video game ===
A video game, titled Juushin Embu DS (獣神演武DS), was developed by ThinkArts and released by D3 Publisher for the Nintendo DS on November 22, 2007.

== Reception ==
=== Manga ===
The manga volumes appeared on Japan's weekly best-seller charts. The second volume debuted in third place in January 2007; the fourth volume debuted in 17th place in June 2009; and the fifth volume debuted in 14th place in December 2010.

Critical response to the manga series was generally positive. David J. Batto of Ramen Para Dos reviewed the manga's first volume and praised the dynamics among the three protagonists: Taito and Ryuko were noted to have contrasting personalities, while Reira felt like a more common type of heroine fitting of Arakawa's writing. Batto, however, also criticized the volume for being overly introductory. Joy Kim of Manga Life considered the first volume's premise generic but enjoyed the execution of the main trio explored in the story, describing it as a decent start with the potential to become an entertaining manga. Carlo Santos of Anime News Network regarded the series as derivative of Akira Toriyama's Dragon Ball manga and lacking the originality for which Fullmetal Alchemist was known. Peter Fobian of Crunchyroll noted that the series shared several similarities with Fullmetal Alchemist but was more focused on wuxia themes and setting rather than the Western-like stories seen in Arakawa's previous work. Due to its focus on Chinese themes, Erkael of Manga News compared Hero Tales to the works of the manga group Clamp, such as RG Veda and X, deeming it nearly plagiaristic, but noting that it still has its own identity. In retrospect, Caitlin Donovan of The Mary Sue observed that Arakawa had already employed a Chinese-inspired setting in Fullmetal Alchemist through the Xingese culture, as well as in her earlier work Demons of Shanghai. Donovan particularly commended the character arc in which the heroine Laila develops toward the series's climax by fighting the narrative's major antagonists, contrasting this with the subsequent animated adaptation, which she criticized heavily for portraying Laila as a damsel in distress with no development. Consequently, Donovan attributed Laila's more compelling character arc in the manga largely to Arakawa's writing. As the series reached its climax in the fourth volume, Chris Zimmerman of ComicBookBin praised the development of the main cast as they prepared for the final fight against the antagonistic Keirou.

Batto praised the detailed artwork and noted how Arakawa improved her artistic skills throughout her career. He also mentioned that the character designs were similar to those in Fullmetal Alchemist, citing the examples of King Bradley and May Chang.. Erkael said that while Arakawa was not the only creator, her distinct style was present in the art as well as in the balance of serious scenes and comedy portrayed in characters that the reviewers found well-developed, even if they were not as original as those from Fullmetal Alchemist. Santos found the second volume entertaining for its handling of fight scenes. Joy Kim said the art would feel familiar to anyone who had read Arakawa's work, as her style itself was notable and handled clear paneling and distinguishable character designs. According to the writer, Arakawa managed to highlight the comedic moments, such as Taitou's failed attempts to unsheathe the Kenkaranpu.

=== Anime ===
Reviewing the anime series, Chris Beveridge of Mania.com said that he tried to enjoy it based on the people behind the project, but he could never find it complex. Instead, he called it a simple story. Despite his attempt to follow the multiple plot twists the anime showed in its second half, Beveridge called the anime mediocre at best, saying the characters lacked depth and that he could not enjoy the anime. Carlo Santos of Anime News Network also had a negative reaction to the anime series, claiming that the anime borrowed nothing interesting to appeal to the viewer and showed little innovation in its formula other than Taitou talking about politics in the tenth episode, with the anime often suffering from "filler". He claimed that while the animation had some problems at times, the fight scenes were well made. Serdar Yegulalp of About.com had a more positive view of the narrative's exploration of Chinese lore, but he criticized the production values, citing the weak animation that recurred despite engaging action scenes.

For the second half of the anime, Santos enjoyed the focus on multiple fights, including Ryujo, Shimei, as well as the final encounter between Taitou and Keirou; while comparing the fights to Dragon Ball, he criticized the results for centering on ideals of friendship and other cliches. Santos commended the theme songs performed by High and Mighty Color and the English dub. Todd Douglass Jr. of DVDTalk found the anime's first half entertaining due to the introductions of menacing villains but believed the anime suffered from pacing issues when Taitou's group journeyed to the capital. Nevertheless, he felt that once the cast reached the capital, the anime began offering entertaining fights and contained fun comedy. Douglass Jr. lamented that the story deviated from the manga to become more compelling but ended up becoming an average series. He praised the development of Keirou in the second half of the anime in contrast to Taitou, whom he criticized for falling into depression over Ryuko's supposed death.
