= Saikabo =

Japanese multinational Korean food brand

- Industry: Korean cuisine; Japanese cuisine
- Founded: April 1994; 31 years ago
- Founder: Oh Yeong-seok, Ryu Hyang-hui
- Number of locations: 19 (Japan) (2023)
- Brands: Pab-sang; Nyam2; Tokyo Saikabo
- Website: www.saikabo.com (in Japanese)

Saikabo (Japanese: 妻家房, Korean: 사이카보 or 처가방) is a multi-national chain of Korean restaurants and food stores based in Japan. Its original location in Yotsuya, Shinjuku, Tokyo, first began as a Korean food store in April 1993, and was converted into a restaurant and Kimchi Museum (キムチ博物館, 김치박물관) in 1996.

The business rose to prominence during the late 1990s and 2000s, as part of the Korean Wave. As of October 2023, the chain has fourteen locations in various cities in Japan, including Tokyo, Nagoya, Osaka, and Yokohama. They also have five more stores and restaurants under various subbrands, including Pab-sang and Nyam2. The chain has operated at least 45 different locations over time. It also has locations in Taiwan, as well as Japanese food stores and restaurants in various cities in South Korea.

== Name ==
The chain's name means "wife's household". According to the chain's website, the name was chosen in the spirit of a Korean tradition, where when a woman marries into her husband's household, she would present some of her family's secret recipes to her new household.

== History ==
The chain originally began as a single food store in 1993, founded by Korean immigrants Oh Yeong-seok (오영석) and wife Ryu Hyang-hui (류향희; 柳香姫).

Oh was born and raised in Daegu, South Korea. He initially studied chemistry in Yeungnam University before dropping out and moving to Japan in 1983. He enrolled in the Bunka Fashion College in Tokyo. After graduation, he worked at the Keio Department Store in Shinjuku, Tokyo, being the first Korean to have been employed there. Ryu arrived in Japan in 1985.

The couple are post-colonial period Korean immigrants, considered by other Koreans in Japan to be "newcomers"; (뉴 커머) that settled in Tokyo. Around that time, many Koreans congregated in the Ōkubo district of Shinjuku. At the time of their arrival, there were only a handful of Korean businesses in the area, and awareness of Korean culture (and even differentiation between North and South Korea) was reportedly fairly low. Some people around that time assumed kimchi was rotten, as it foamed during the fermentation process.

The couple made a point of showcasing Korean culture to people in the community. In 1989, Oh invited his coworkers to his son's first birthday party (doljanchi). Korean food served at the party was so well-received, that the couple began working towards creating a Korean food store. In April 1993, they founded a company Yeongmyeong (영명), along with their first store. They made a particular effort to use ingredients and imports from South Korea, and to distinguish their kimchi from what they considered a Japanese imitation product: "kimuchi". They also made an effort to employ South Korean exchange students, with 30 of their 50 employees being South Korean in 2000.

After receiving significant positive reactions to the various dishes they made, they felt there was a business opportunity, and persuaded management at Keio to let them create a second food store in the department store. By 1995, Ryu had a kimchi factory that was experiencing some business success, and the couple operated six stores, mostly in department stores. Oh left Keio that year, and the couple converted the original store into a restaurant in 1996. The couple began showcasing Korean cuisine in Japanese newspapers and television programs, including on Hanamaru Market. Ryu published a number of cookbooks, spoke at local universities, and organized Korean food cultural events across Japan. Oh became seen as such an evangelist for the cuisine that he developed the nickname of the "Kimchi Professor".

Around this time, Korean culture began experiencing a boom in Japan with the rise of the Korean Wave, which led to the rise of their business, as well as those of numerous other local and South Korean competitors. Revenue for Yeongmyeong increased over ten-fold to 450 million yen between 1993 and 2000. By 2000, they had eight stores. At the same time, Oh produced and sold clothing in Japan.

They opened their first location outside Tokyo on 9 March 2005, in Nagoya. In summer 2009, they began opening Japanese restaurants in South Korea under the name "Tokyo Saikabo". Oh had his daughters manage the restaurants.

The chain has been affected by the turbulent diplomatic relations between Japan and South Korea. After the 2011 Fukushima nuclear accident, sales of Japanese food in South Korea dropped. After a controversial 2012 visit by South Korean president Lee Myung-bak to the contested Liancourt Rocks, there was a significant boycott of Korea-related businesses in Japan. Saikabo's business was impacted over the following three years; they experienced a 30% drop in sales, the closure of six of their locations, and the refusal of Japanese business owners to renew contracts with the chain due to uncertainty over their business prospects. Anti-Korean sentiment in Japan also peaked, with daily anti-Korean rallies held in Ōkubo, often held by the far right group Zaitokukai, around that time. In 2015, Oh reported that as a "newcomer", he had not experienced the brunt of discrimination until this boycott, and expressed fear that the situation could worsen.

In 2020, they entered the Taiwanese market.

== Gallery ==
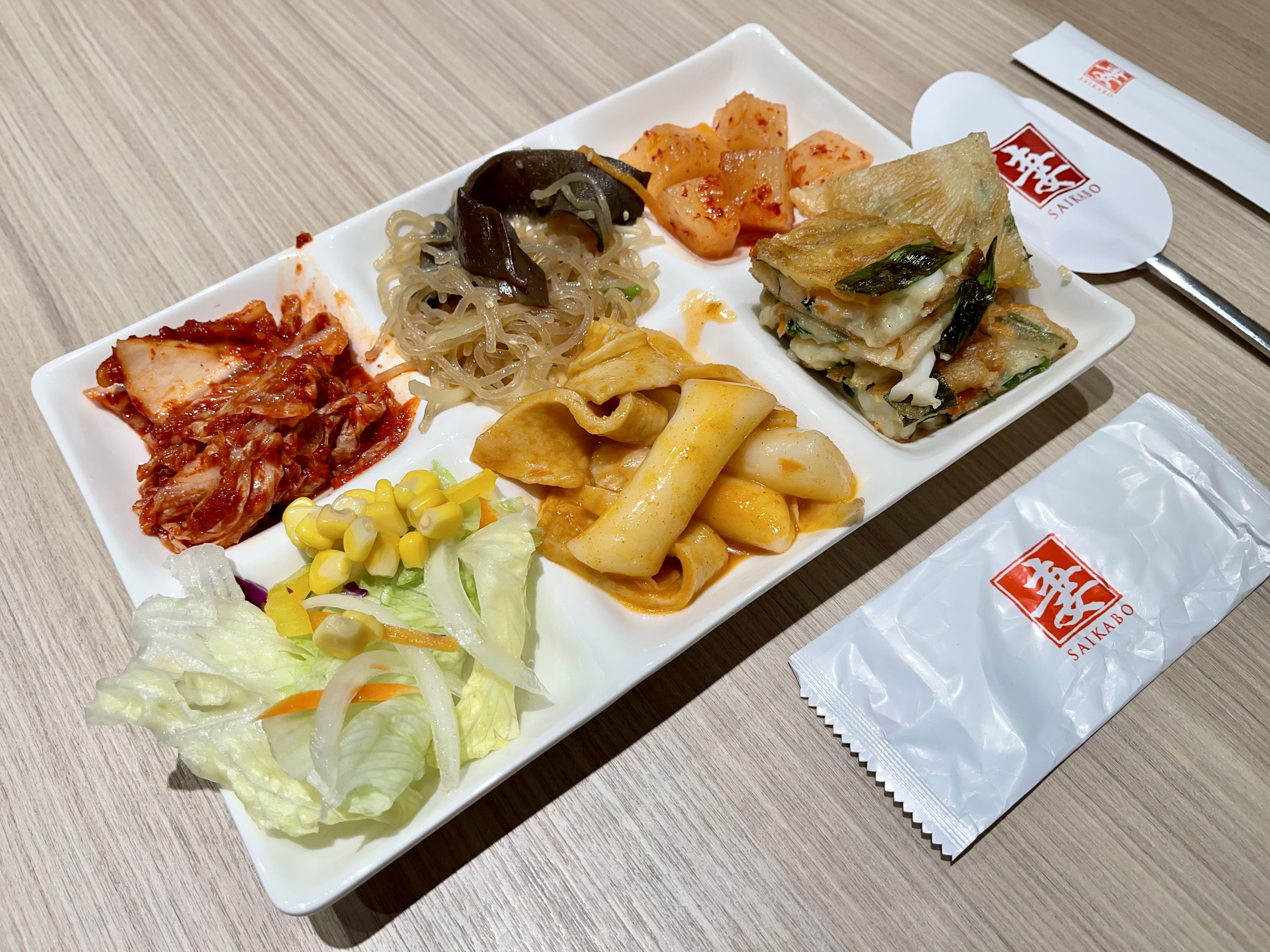
Food in one of their Taipei, Taiwan, locations (2021)

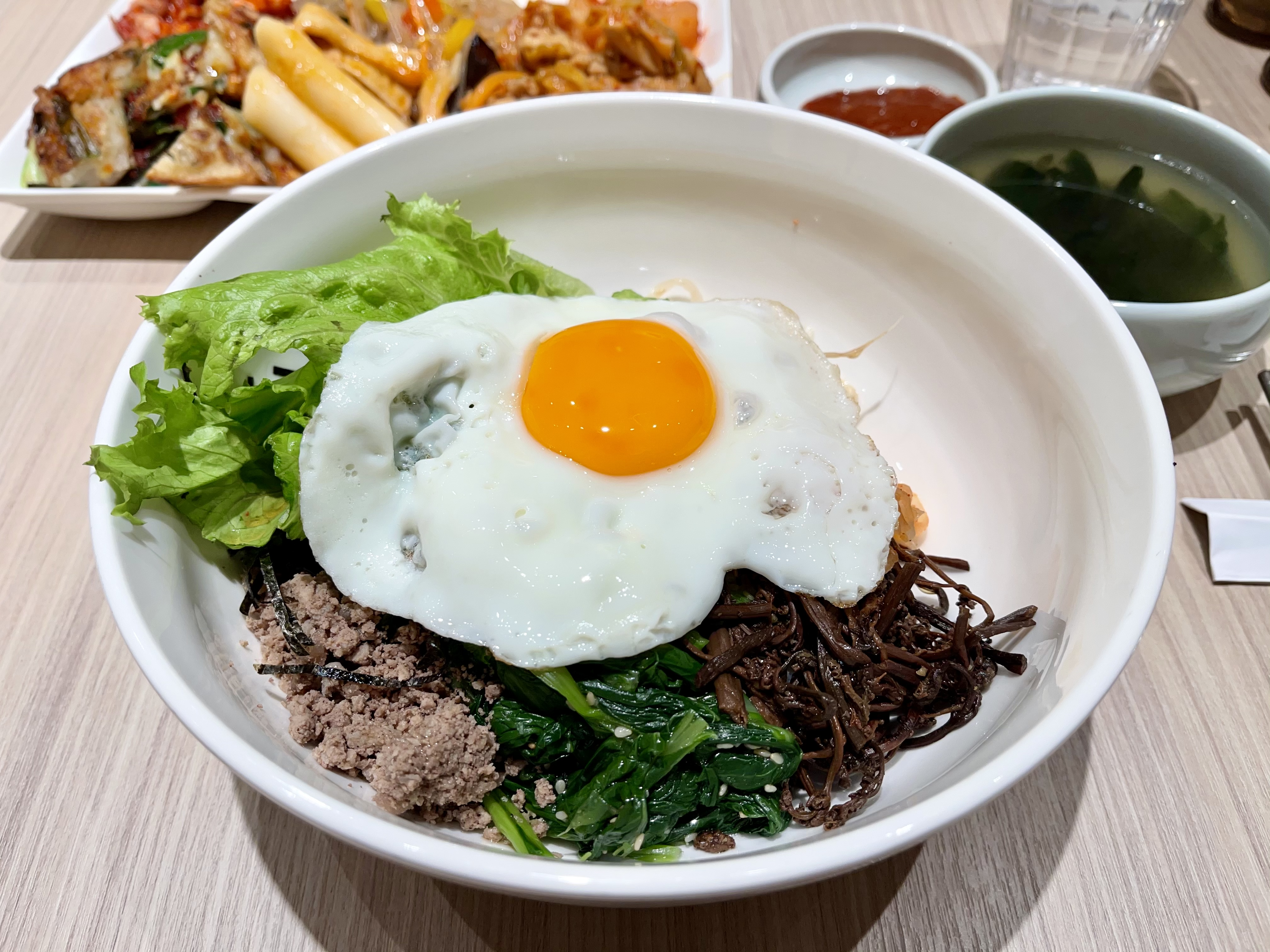
Bibimbap in Taipei (2021)
