= Shin-Ōkubo Station =

Railway station in Tokyo, Japan

Coordinates: 35.701063°N 139.700228°E

JY16 Shin-Ōkubo Station 新大久保駅
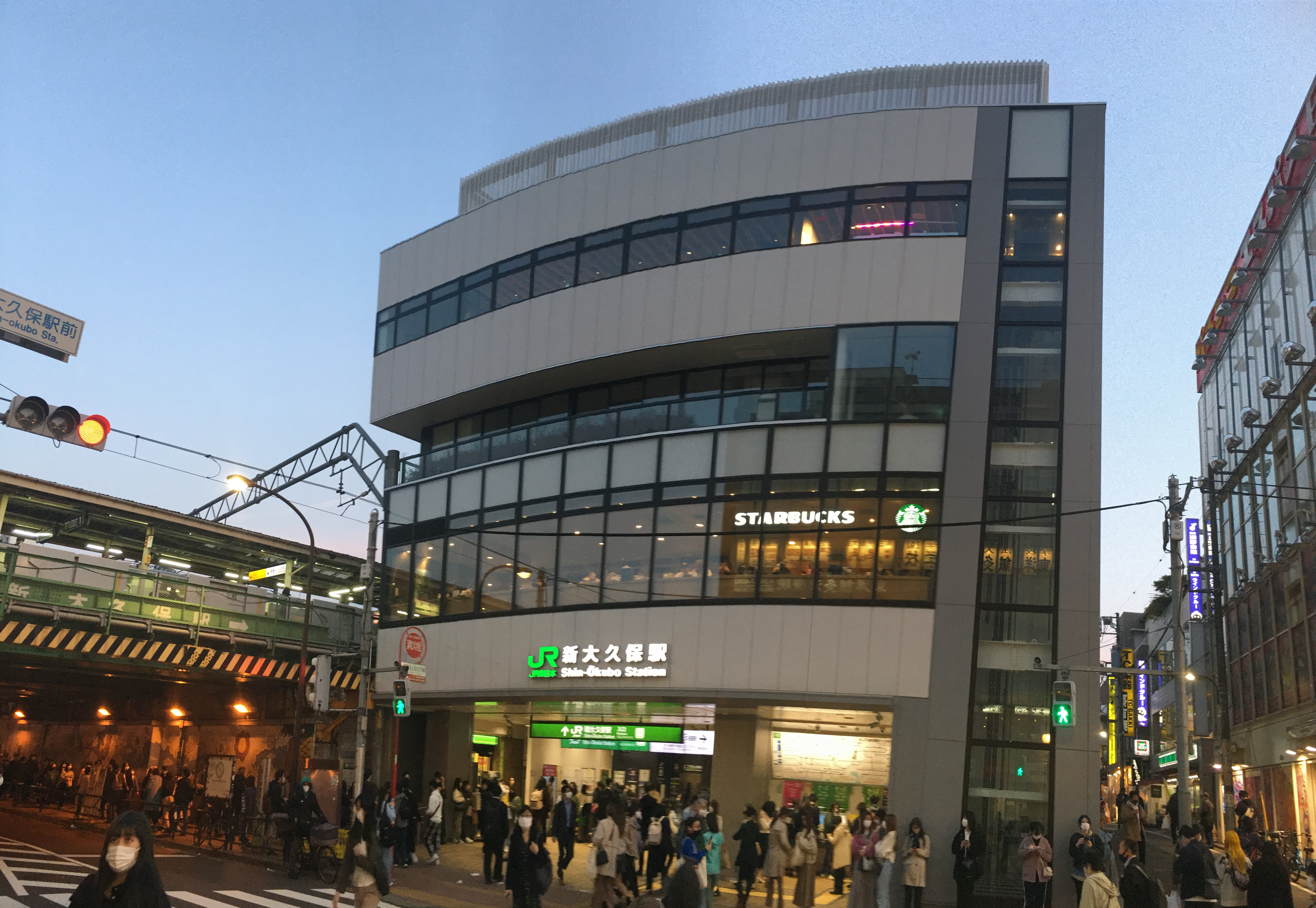
- Shin-Ōkubo Station exterior in April 2022

General information
- Location: 1 Hyakunin-chō, Shinjuku City, Tokyo; Japan
- Operator: JR East
- Line: Yamanote Line
- Platforms: 1 island platform
- Tracks: 2

Construction
- Structure type: Elevated
- Accessible: Yes

Other information
- Station code: JY16

History
- Opened: 15 November 1914; 111 years ago

Passengers
- FY2024: 98,492 (daily)

Services
Preceding station	JR East	Following station
Shinjuku Next counter-clockwise	Yamanote Line	Takadanobaba JY15 Next clockwise
Location
- Location within Tokyo Yamanote Loop Location within Tokyo wards area Location within Japan

Shin-Ōkubo Station (新大久保駅, Shin-Ōkubo-eki) is a railway station on the Yamanote Line in Shinjuku, Tokyo, Japan, operated by East Japan Railway Company (JR East). Opened on November 15, 1914, it is close to the large local Korean ethnic neighborhood. Shin-Ōkubo Station has only one exit.

== Lines ==
Shin-Ōkubo Station is served by the circular Yamanote Line, with trains running every four minutes during the daytime off-peak. It is one of only two stations on the Yamanote Line that does not provide a direct connection to any other line, the other being Mejiro Station, two stops away.

== Station layout ==
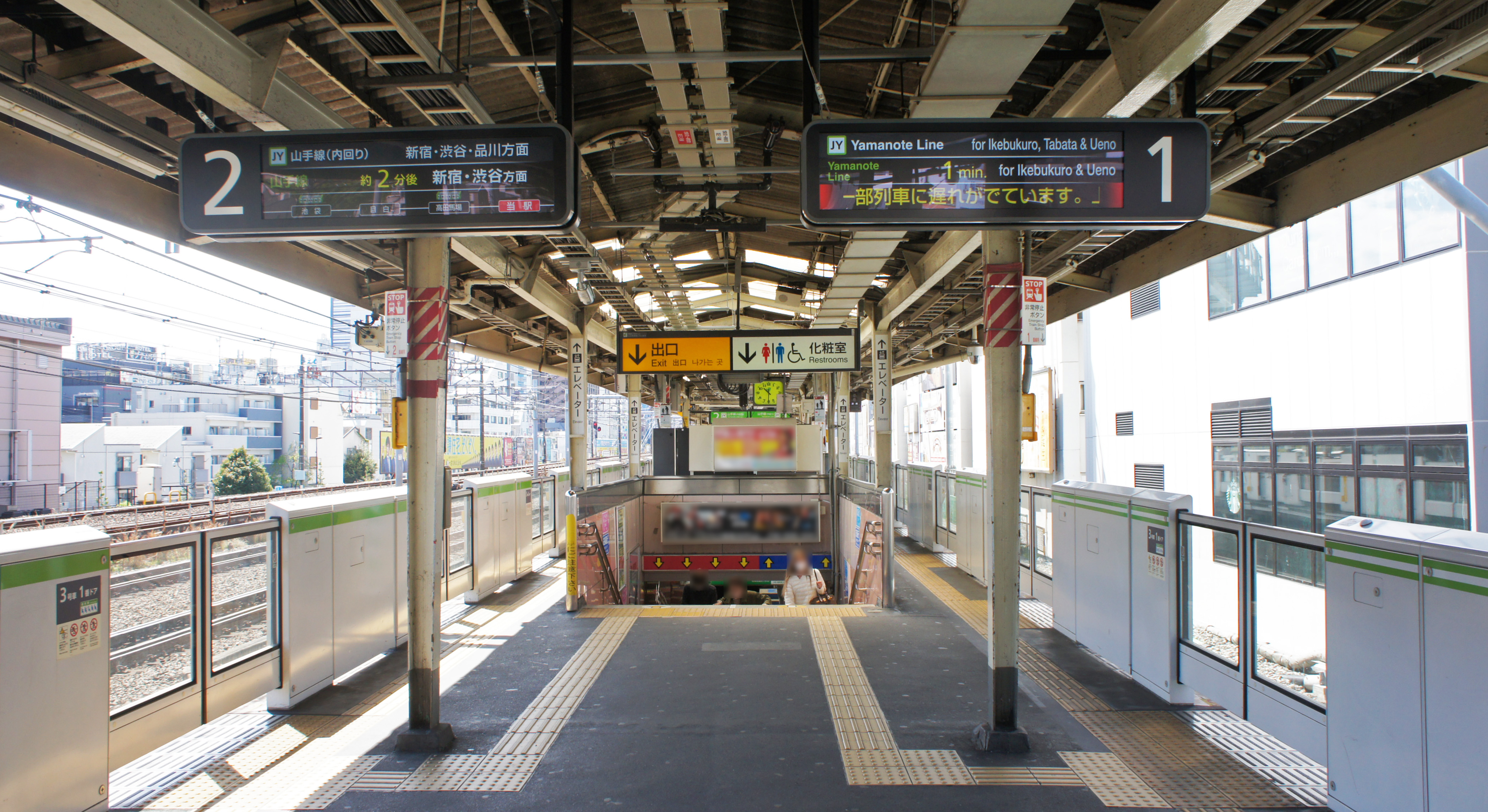
The station platform, April 2021

The elevated station consists of a single island platform serving two tracks. The Yamanote Freight Line tracks used by Saikyō Line and Shōnan-Shinjuku Line services lie to the east of the Yamanote Line tracks.

Platform edge doors were installed on the Yamanote Line platforms in 2013.

=== Platforms ===
1	Yamanote Line	Clockwise for Ikebukuro, Tabata, and Ueno
2	Yamanote Line	Anti-clockwise for Shinjuku, Shibuya, and Shinagawa

== Surrounding area ==
Less than a kilometer north of the sprawling Shinjuku Station, Shin-Ōkubo Station is located approximately 5 minutes' walk from Shinjuku's Kabukichō district. It is also about a 3-minute walk from Ōkubo Station on the Chūō-Sōbu Line.

Near the station, Okubo-dori (Okubo street) and surrounding side streets are lined with all kinds of small shops, most of them selling Korean food and pop-culture items. Also in the vicinity are Korean-themed bars, nightclubs, and restaurants.

== History ==
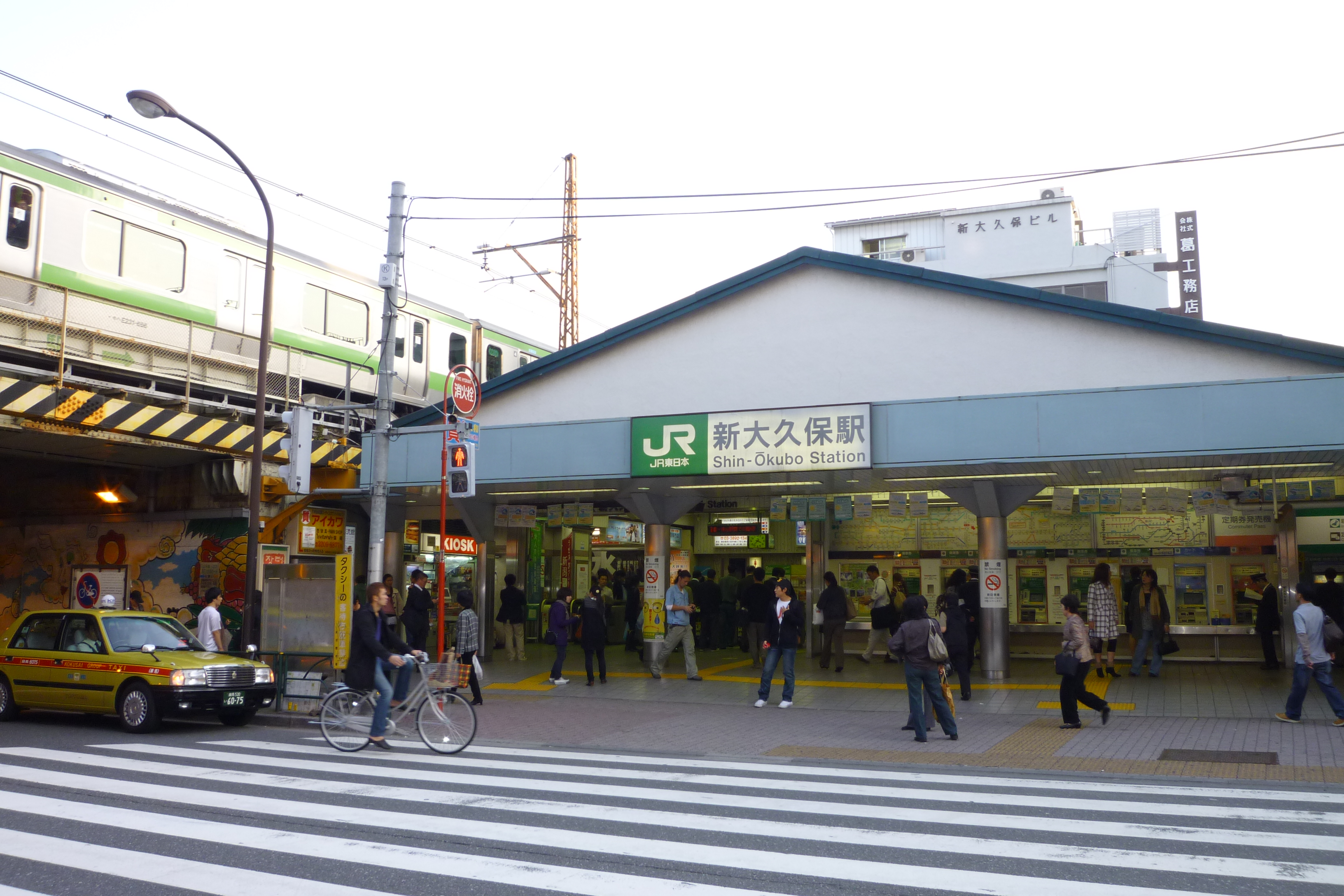
The former station building, pictured in 2009

The station opened on 15 November 1914.

During the late 1940s, while Seibu Railway was planning the extension of the Seibu Shinjuku Line from Takadanobaba to Shinjuku, Seibu planned to open a station at Shin-Ōkubo. Among several plans considered, one option called for the existing JR station to be moved to the west and for Seibu to take over the existing station. Toyama Park, at that time under US occupation, was being considered as a location for a new freight yard, and the rerouting of the Yamanote and Seibu lines was intended to accommodate freight traffic to and from the new yard. However, the freight yard plan was later abandoned, and the Seibu extension opened in 1952 with no stop at Shin-Ōkubo.

Station numbering was introduced in 2016 with Shin-Ōkubo being assigned station number JY16.

== Passenger statistics ==
In fiscal 2011, the station was used by an average of 42,433 passengers daily (boarding passengers only).

The passenger figures for previous years are as shown below.

Fiscal year	Daily average
2000	34,155
2005	34,104
2010	37,344
2011	42,433

== Incidents ==
On 26 January 2001, a 47-year-old photographer from Yokohama and a 26-year-old Korean student died at the station when they were hit by a Yamanote Line train while trying to save a drunken Japanese man who had fallen off the platform onto the tracks and was also killed in the accident. The Korean student's life story formed the basis for the film 26 Years Diary, released in 2007 in Japan and in 2008 in Korea.

== See also ==
- List of railway stations in Japan
- Transportation in Greater Tokyo
