= Tadoritsuku Basho/Oxalis =

"Tadoritsuku Basho"/"Oxalis"

Single by High and Mighty Color

from the album San
- Released: January 24, 2007
- Genre: Pop rock
- Label: SMEJ
- Songwriters: High and Mighty Color
- Producer: Hal

High and Mighty Color singles chronology
"Enrai (Tooku ni Aru Akari)" (2006)	"Tadoritsuku Basho" / "Oxalis" (2007)	"Dreams" (2007)

Alternative cover
- CD+DVD edition

"Tadoritsuku Basho"/"Oxalis" (辿り着く場所／オキザリス, Tadoritsuku Basho/Okizarisu) is a double A-side single released by High and Mighty Color on January 24, 2007. It comes in two editions, one featuring a bonus DVD containing two music videos.

== Overview ==
"Tadoritsuku Basho"/"Oxalis" was released on 24 January 2007, being High and Mighty Color's first release of the year. Both songs on the A-side, "Tadoritsuku Basho" and "Oxalis", were a part of the soundtrack of the biopic film 26 Years Diary (あなたを忘れない), with "Tadoritsuku Basho being used as the theme song". The lyrics of the song were written by Mākii, vocalist of the group, who was set to star as the female lead in the film. She wrote the lyrics with the film in mind, taking into account what the character she were to play would want to convey in the scene the song appears. The melody of the song, written before the lyrics, was chosen out of a selection of the group's songs by the producers of the film, with the one being selected being composed by Meg, the guitarist. The song "Oxalis" was used as incidental music sung by Mākii in the film.

This single is the group's to come in alternating editions (one with and one without the DVD) and their first double A-side single. Music videos for each song were produced, the one for "Tadoritsuku Basho" (directed by Yūsuke Takuno) being released one day after the one for "Oxalis" (directed by Hiroto Fujiyasu).

== Track listing ==
CD

1. "Tadoritsuku Basho" (辿り着く場所)
2. "Oxalis" (オキザリス)
3. "Tadoritsuku Basho (Movie Version)" (辿り着く場所（MOVIE VERSION）)
4. "Tadoritsuku Basho (Less Vocal Track)" (辿り着く場所（Less vocal track）)

Bonus DVD

1. "Tadoritsuku Basho" (辿り着く場所)
2. "Gōman Seikatsu Eizō" (傲慢生活映像)

All songs written and performed by High and Mighty Color.

== Personnel ==
- Maakii & Yuusuke — vocals
- Kazuto — guitar
- Meg — guitar
- Mackaz — bass
- Sassy — drums

== Charts ==
Weekly chart performance for "Tadoritsuku Basho"/"Oxalis"
Chart (2007)	Peak position
Japan (Oricon)	18
