= Rock Pit =

Studio album by High and Mighty Color
- Released: JPN March 19, 2008
- Recorded: Sound Crew Studio, Sound Inn studio, Yumebangta Studio from Kadena, 3rd Garage Studio, Spice Studio, Hal Aterier
- Genre: Alternative rock; post-hardcore
- Label: JPN SMEJ
- Producer: High and Mighty Color

High and Mighty Color chronology
San (2007)	Rock Pit (2008)	Swamp Man (2009)

Singles from Rock Pit
- 1. "Flashback/Komorebi no Uta" Released: February 27, 2008

Rock Pit is the fourth album by Japanese band High and Mighty Color. The album was released in Japan on March 19, 2008 following two singles.

== Overview ==
Rock Pit was the first time that all the previous single A-sides are not collected into a following album. "Dreams", the 10th single from the band, was used on the best album, 10 Color Singles. Rock Pit contains three new versions of their previous singles, "Amazing" and "Flashback/Komorebi no Uta", as well as the cover of Luna Sea's song "Rosier". The third track of the album, "Toxic", was used as the theme song for the PlayStation 2 video game Warriors Orochi: Rebirth of the Demon Lord.

The album peaked at #24 on the Weekly Oricon with 6,767 copies sold in its first week and charted for approximately four weeks.

== Track listing ==
CD

No.	Title	Writer(s)	Length
1.	"Amazing -Prelude of Rock Pit-"	Mākii and Yuusuke	4:27
2.	"Break now!"	Yuusuke	2:50
3.	"Toxic"	Yuusuke	3:52
4.	"Flashback (フラッシュバック, Furasshubakku)" (Digital Grain Mix)	Mākii and Yuusuke	4:37
5.	"Hinata"	Yuusuke	4:35
6.	"Earth"	Yuusuke	4:48
7.	"*Skit*"	Yuusuke	1:30
8.	"Gambling (ギャンブリング, Gyanburingu)"	Mākii and Yuusuke	2:37
9.	"Meki Meki (メキメキ, Conspicuously)"	Yuusuke	3:23
10.	"Zero Sympathy"	Mackaz	2:40
11.	"Rosier" (cover)	Luna Sea	4:42
12.	"Tokyo Night (東京ナイト, Tōkyō Naito)"	Mākii and Yuusuke	4:24
13.	"Tegami (手紙, Letter)"	Yuusuke and Sassy	4:41
14.	"Komorebi no Uta (木漏レビノ歌, Song of Filtering Trees)" (Rock Pit Version)	Mākii and Yuusuke	3:42

DVD

1. High and Mighty Color Show Time

== Personnel ==
- Mākii – vocals
- Yuusuke – vocals
- Meg – guitars
- Kazuto – guitars
- Sassy – drums
- Mackaz – bass
