= Run Run Run (High and Mighty Color song) =

Single by High and Mighty Color

from the album G∞ver
- Released: June 27, 2005
- Genre: Pop rock; electronic rock
- Length: 13:24
- Label: SMEJ
- Songwriter(s): High and Mighty Color
- Producer(s): Hal

High and Mighty Color singles chronology
"Over" (2005)	"Run Run Run" (2005)	"Days" (2005)

"Run Run Run" (typeset "RUN☆RUN☆RUN" on the cover) is the third single by Japanese rock band High and Mighty Color.

== Information ==
"Run Run Run" is the band's third single. It is more on the pop side than the previous single and was described as a song for the summer by the group's official website. "Run Run Run" was used in advertisements for the Lotte Chewing Gum "Pure White Citrus".

Now, I'm running toward you!
I won't stop! I can't be stopped anymore
Throwing my hands up, I jump high!
The sun sparkles and shines
Don't stop!
Hey, get up!
The sky is so blue
So this isn't worthless yet

== Track listing ==
1. "RUN☆RUN☆RUN – 4:21
2. "Hopelessness" – 4:41
3. "RUN☆RUN☆RUN (Instrumental)" – 4:20

All songs written by HIGH and MIGHTY COLOR.

== Personnel ==
- Maakii & Yuusuke — vocals
- Kazuto — guitar
- MEG — guitar
- maCKAz — bass
- SASSY — drums

== Charts ==
Oricon Sales Chart (Japan)

Release	Chart	Peak position	Sales
22 June 2005	Oricon Weekly Singles Chart	14	27,340
