= Ichirin no Hana =

2006 single by High and Mighty Color

Single by High and Mighty Color

from the album Gō on Progressive
- B-side: "Warped Reflection"
- Released: January 16, 2006
- Genre: Post-hardcore
- Length: 16:12
- Label: SMEJ
- Songwriters: High and Mighty Color
- Producer: Hal

High and Mighty Color singles chronology
"Style (Get Glory in This Hand)" (2005)	"Ichirin no Hana" (2006)	"Dive into Yourself" (2006)

"Ichirin no Hana" (一輪の花) is a song by Japanese rock band High and Mighty Color. The song was released as the second and final single from the band's second album Gō on Progressive on January 16, 2006.

== Overview ==
"Ichirin no Hana" is the band's sixth single. It retained number two in the Oricon charts for most of the week of its release, making it the group's biggest hit since "Over", and even surpassed that single in sales. It is a rock song, blended with some rapping from Yūsuke. "Ichirin no Hana" was used as the third opening theme for the anime adaption of Bleach and was certified gold for shipments of over 100,000 by the RIAJ in January 2006. The title of the song is translated to English as "a single flower"

== Track list ==
1. "Ichirin no Hana" – 3:40
2. "Warped Reflection" – 4:07
3. "Ichirin no Hana ~Huge Hollow Mix~" (remixed by DT of NATM3) – 4:37
4. "Ichirin no Hana (Less Vocal Track)" – 3:40

All songs written by High and Mighty Color.

== Production ==
- Hide2 (Norishrocks) – creative & art direction
- Tsousie (Jetrock Graphics) – art direction & design
- Ryuichi Tamura (Norishrocks) – co-art design
- Rocca Works – costume
- Eiji Tanaki (D&N Planning) – styling
- Keiko Nakatani (Mingle) – hair and make-up
- Atsushi Otaki (Ad Force), Masahiro Aoki (D&N Planning), Noriko Yamashita (SMC) & Kaori"Kacch" Nagai (Norishrocks) – products coordination

== TV Performances ==
- January 13, 2006 - Music Fighter
- January 14, 2006 - CDTV
- January 20, 2006 - Music Station
- January 27, 2006 - PopJam
- January 28, 2006 - Melodix!

== Charts ==
Oricon Sales Chart (Japan)
Release	Chart	Peak position	Sales
January 11, 2006	Oricon Daily Singles Chart	2	
January 11, 2006	Oricon Weekly Singles Chart	2	84,562
