= DracoVirgo =

Japanese band formed in 2017

- Genre: Alternative rock
- Years active: 2017–present
- Label: Universal Sigma
- Members: MAAKIII; mACKAz; SASSY
- Website: dracovirgo.jp

DracoVirgo is a Japanese alternative rock band, formed in 2017.

== Career ==
Three members are the former members of High and Mighty Color, which disbanded in 2010. They formed the new band DracoVirgo on August 23, 2017.

They held their first live, DracoVirgo 1st LIVE TOUR "Opportunity", on February 26, 2018.

== Members ==
- MAAKIII, vocalist.
- mACKAz, bass.
- SASSY, drum.

== Discography ==
=== Single ===
Universal Music Japan

Release date	Title	Peak Position
Release date	Title	JPN
Sept. 4, 2019	Hajimenouta (ハジメノウタ)	103

=== As featured artist ===
Release date	Title	Peak Position
Release date	Title	Billboard Japan
Nov. 29, 2017	Seiren'naru Heretics (清廉なるHeretics); Kegani ft. DracoVirgo	6
