= Yuusuke (musician) =

- Also known as: Yuhsuke, Yūsuke
- Born: 国吉祐輔; January 25, 1985 (age 41)
- Origin: Okinawa, Japan
- Genres: Rock
- Occupations: Singer, musician
- Instrument: Vocals
- Years active: 2003–2010, 2012–present
- Label: SME Records
- Member of: SUN OF A STARVE
- Formerly of: HIGH and MIGHTY COLOR
- Website: handmc.jp

Yūsuke Kuniyoshi (国吉祐輔, Kuniyoshi Yūsuke), known simply as Yuusuke (ユウスケ, Yūsuke), is a Japanese singer, best known as a vocalist for High and Mighty Color from 2003 until their breakup in 2010. He was the last member and the first vocalist to join the band before they were known as High and Mighty Color. He was born on January 25, 1985. He is known mainly for the screaming vocals in most of the band's songs. Yuusuke credits Metallica as one of his major musical influences.

Yuusuke has now become Sun of a Starve's featuring vocal. They have released one EP entitled Starve.

== Singles ==
#	Information	Sales
1st / Debut Single	Honno: Released: May 23, 2007; Format: CD5"; Oricon Top 200 Weekly Peak:	

== Collaborations ==
[Tama] – Honnou (feat. Yuusuke from [High and Mighty Color])
