= 26 Years Diary =

2007 Japanese film by Hanadō Junji

- Japanese theatrical poster
- Directed by: Hanadō Junji
- Screenplay by: Hanadō Junji
- Based on: 26 Years Diary by Shin Yoon Chan
- Produced by: Junichi Mimura; Atsuko Yamakawa; Akifumi Sugihara
- Starring: Lee Tae-sung; Mākii; Naoto Takenaka; Takatoshi Kaneko; Chung Dong-hwan
- Cinematography: Ryu Segawa
- Edited by: Hirohide Abe
- Music by: Masayoshi Sugimura
- Production company: AMG Entertainment
- Distributed by: Sony Pictures Entertainment Japan (Japan); Lotte Entertainment (South Korea)
- Release dates: January 27, 2007 (Japan); October 30, 2008 (South Korea)
- Running time: 131 minutes
- Countries: Japan; South Korea
- Languages: Japanese; Korean
- Box office: $3,614,835

26 Years Diary (Japanese: あなたを忘れない Anata wo Wasurenai; Korean: 너를 잊지 않을거야 Neoreul Ijji Anheulgeoya; literally "I Won't Forget You") is a biopic that tells the story of Lee Su-hyon's life and death.

The film details the 26-year-old Korean student's experiences in Japan, including going to school and his developing romance with a Japanese student (played by Mākii). He died on January 21, 2001, along with a Japanese photographer, Shiro Sekine, while both were trying to save the life of a man who had fallen onto the tracks at the Shin-Ōkubo Station in Tokyo. The soundtrack of the movie is the song "Okizarisu" by High and Mighty Color.

== Plot ==
The film is based on a true story, Soo-hyun (Lee Taesung) travels from Korea, studying in Japan he meets Yuri (High and Mighty Color's lead singer, Maakii). Both share similar interests in music and sports as they become closer while dealing with language and racial barriers.

== Cast ==
- Lee Tae-sung as Lee Soo-hyun
- Maki Onaga as Yuri Hoshino
- Takatoshi Kaneko as Ryuji Kazama
- Naoto Takenaka as Kazuma Hirata
- Junko Hamaguchi as Rumiko Okamoto (Miruki)
- Seo Jae-kyung
- Hideko Hara as Humie Hoshino
- Miho Yoshioka as Asako Kojima
- Jung Dong-hwan as Soo-hyun's father
- Lee Kyung-jin as Shin Yun-chan
- Lee Seol-ah as Lee Su-geon
- Hong Kyung-min
- Lou Oshiba
