= Songs Day =

Utanohi うたの日
- The logo for Songs Day consists of the stylized text うたの日; The たの is arranged vertically so as to resemble a sanshin
- Locations: Okinawa, Japan

Utanohi (Japanese: うたの日, Songs Day) is an annual music festival held in Okinawa. Headliners include Seijin Noborikawa, Begin, Rimi Natsukawa, Orange Range, HY, Mongol800, Kariyushi58, 2side1brain, Perfume and The Boom, best known for the song "Shima Uta".

== See also ==
- Okinawan music
- Music of Japan
