= Gō on Progressive =

Go On Progressive

Studio album by High and Mighty Color
- Released: April 5, 2006
- Recorded: Sound Crew Studio, Spice Studio, Hal Aterier
- Genre: Post-hardcore; nu metal; alternative rock
- Length: 60:40
- Label: SMEJ
- Producer: Hal

High and Mighty Color chronology
G∞ver (2005)	Go On Progressive (2006)	San (2007)

Singles from Go on Progressive
- 1. "Style ~Get Glory in This Hand~" Released: October 31, 2005; 2. "Ichirin no Hana" Released: January 16, 2006

Go On Progressive (傲音プログレッシヴ, Gōon Puroguresshivu) is the second studio album by Japanese rock band High and Mighty Color. The album was released on April 5, 2006 through Sony Music Entertainment Japan, less than seven months after their debut G∞ver.

== Overview ==
The album was announced after only two singles having been released for it, half of what was released for their original album G∞ver. This album focused more on rock music and less on pop, which their first album focused heavily on. Unlike their first album, almost all titles for the various songs are written in Japanese as opposed to English used in the band's first album.

== Track listing ==
All tracks are written by High and Mighty Color

No.	Title	Length
1.	"Ichirin no Hana" (一輪の花; "One Lone Flower")	3:41
2.	"For Dear..."	4:19
3.	"Here I Am"	4:39
4.	"Hōseki no Namida" (宝石の涙; "Jewel Tears")	4:30
5.	"Mizu Tama Ramune" (水玉ラムネ; "Polka Dot Soda Pop")	4:12
6.	"Haitoku no Jōnetsu" (背徳の情熱; "Corrupted Passion")	4:48
7.	"Tsumi" (罪; "Sin")	4:41
8.	"Riaru Wārudo" (リアルワールド; "Real World")	4:07
9.	"A Place to Go"	4:19
10.	"Style ~Get Glory in This Hand~"	4:14
11.	"Pāru Shadō" (パールシャドウ; "Pearl Shadow")	4:31
12.	"Kuro Ageha Mau Oka" (黒アゲハ舞う丘; "Hill of Black Fluttering Swallowtails")	4:10
13.	"Hoshizora ni Furu Yuki" (星空に降る雪; "Snow Falling from the Starry Sky")	4:06
14.	"Gāden Obu Mai Hāto" (ガーデン オブ MY ハート; "Garden of My Heart")	4:15
Total length:		60:40

== Personnel ==
- Mākii – vocals
- Yuusuke – vocals
- Meg – guitars
- Kazuto – guitars
- Sassy – drums
- Mackaz – bass

== Charts ==
Album - Oricon Sales Chart (Japan)

Release	Chart	Peak position	Sales total
5 April 2006	Oricon Daily Albums Chart	6	
5 April 2006	Oricon Weekly Albums Chart	7	41,000+
5 April 2006	Oricon Yearly Albums Chart	316	

Singles - Oricon Sales Chart (Japan)

Release	Single	Chart	Peak position
9 November 2005	"Style ~Get Glory in This Hand~"	Oricon Daily Singles Chart	
9 November 2005	"Style ~Get Glory in This Hand~"	Oricon Weekly Singles Chart	19
11 January 2006	"Ichirin no Hana"	Oricon Daily Singles Chart	2
11 January 2006	"Ichirin no Hana"	Oricon Weekly Singles Chart	2
