= San (album) =

Studio album by High and Mighty Color
- Released: February 21, 2007
- Genre: Alternative rock; nu metal
- Length: 64:35
- Label: SMEJ

High and Mighty Color chronology
Gō on Progressive (2006)	San (2007)	Rock Pit (2008)

Alternative cover
- CD+DVD edition

Singles from San
- 1. "Dive into Yourself" Released: July 26, 2006; 2. "Enrau ~Tooku ni Aru Akari" Released: October 25, 2006; 3. "Tadoritsuku Basho/Oxalis" Released: January 24, 2007

Professional ratings
Review scores
Source	Rating
AllMusic	3.5/5 stars

San (参) is the third album by High and Mighty Color, released on February 21, 2007. It comes in two editions, one featuring an additional DVD which contains most of the band's music videos.

== Overview ==
Included on this album is a re-recording of "Dive into Yourself". A contest was held, with the voice of the winner to be included in the chorus of this version. The first press edition of the album comes with a "super picture label". The special edition DVD+CD release of the album contained all of the band's music videos except "Style ~Get Glory in This Hand~", which was left out for an unknown reason. When released, the album reached a weekly peak at number 16 and became the band's lowest selling album, lasting only one week on the Oricon top 20 chart.

== Track listing ==
1. "Enrai ~Tooku ni Aru Akari~" (遠雷 〜遠くにある明かり〜, Distant Thunder (Light in the Distance)) – 4:24
2. "Resistance" (レジスタンス, Rejisutansu) – 3:55
3. "Dive into Yourself (Your Voice Version)" – 3:48
4. "Koigokoro" (恋心, Awakening of Love) – 4:10
5. "Oxalis (オキザリス, Okizarisu) – 4:27
6. "Hummingbird" (ハミングバード, Hamingubādo) – 4:25
7. "The Moon Illuminates" – 3:57
8. "Yoake Mae" (夜明け前, Before Dawn)– 4:46
9. "Sandome no Sakura" (三度目の桜, The Third Cherry Blossom) – 3:59
10. "Hibana" (火花, Spark) – 4:48
11. "Suiren" (睡蓮, Water Lily) – 4:30
12. "Last Word" – 3:54
13. "A Shape of Love" – 4:14
14. "Tadoritsuku Basho" (辿り着く場所, The Place Where We Arrive) – 5:12
15. "Oxalis (Movie Version)" – 3:53

Bonus DVD

1. "Ichirin no Hana"
2. "Dive into Yourself"
3. "Enrai ~Tooku ni Aru Akari~"
4. "Tadoritsuku Basho"
5. "Oxalis"
6. "Omake"

All songs written by High and Mighty Color.

== Personnel ==
- Mākī – vocals
- Yūsuke – vocals
- Meg – guitars
- Kazuto – guitars
- Sassy – drums
- Mackaz – bass

== Charts ==
Album - Oricon Sales Chart (Japan) Oricon Sales Chart (Japan)

Release	Chart	Peak position	Sales total
February 21, 2007	Oricon Daily Albums Chart	10	
February 21, 2007	Oricon Weekly Albums Chart	16	12,535+

Release	Single	Chart	Peak position
July 26, 2006	"Dive into Yourself"	Oricon Daily Singles Chart	15
July 26, 2006	"Dive into Yourself"	Oricon Weekly Singles Chart	24
October 25, 2006	"Enrai: Tooku ni Aru Akari"	Oricon Daily Singles Chart	12
October 25, 2006	"Enrai: Tooku ni Aru Akari"	Oricon Weekly Singles Chart	15
January 24, 2007	"Tadoritsuku Basho"/"Oxalis"	Oricon Daily Singles Chart	12
January 24, 2007	"Tadoritsuku Basho"/"Oxalis"	Oricon Weekly Singles Chart	18
