= Days (High and Mighty Color song) =

Single by High and Mighty Color

from the album G∞ver
- Released: August 22, 2005
- Genre: Pop rock
- Length: 8:24
- Label: SMEJ
- Songwriter(s): High and Mighty Color
- Producer(s): Hal

High and Mighty Color singles chronology
"Run Run Run" (2005)	"Days" (2005)	"Style (Get Glory in This Hand)" (2005)

"Days" is a song by Japanese rock band High and Mighty Color. It was released as the fourth and final single from the band's debut album G∞ver on August 17, 2005.

== Overview ==
"Days" is the band's fourth single. Like "Run Run Run", it is more pop oriented than previous singles and more of a ballad. There are two music videos for "Days", one focusing more on the band as a whole, while the other focuses more on Yuusuke. The official site describes the song as a closing to the end of summer vacation.

== Track list ==
1. "Days" – 4:02
2. "Seek" – 4:22

All songs written by HIGH and MIGHTY COLOR.

== Personnel ==
- Maakii & Yuusuke — vocals
- Kazuto — guitar
- MEG — guitar
- macKaz — bass
- SASSY — drums

== Production ==
- Hide2 (Norishrocks) – creative & art direction

== Charts ==
Oricon Sales Chart (Japan)

Release	Chart	Peak position	Sales
17 August 2005	Oricon Weekly Singles Chart	22	10,253
