= Dive into Yourself =

"DIVE into YOURSELF"

Single by High and Mighty Color

from the album San
- Released: July 26, 2006
- Genre: Hard rock
- Length: 16:46
- Label: SMEJ
- Songwriter(s): High and Mighty Color
- Producer(s): Hal

High and Mighty Color singles chronology
"Ichirin no Hana" (2006)	"DIVE into YOURSELF" (2006)	"Enrai (Tooku ni Aru Akari)" (2006)

"Dive into Yourself" is a single released by High and Mighty Color on July 26, 2006

== Overview ==
"Dive into Yourself" is the band's seventh single and the first after the release of their second album Gou on Progressive. "Dive into Yourself" was used as an advertisement theme for the PlayStation 2 game Sengoku Basara 2 and Sengoku Basara 2 Heroes, while the B-side "Flying Music" was used as the theme song for Harmony with the Earth ID. Included on the single was a paper form that allowed one to enter a contest when filled out and mailed in. The winner of the contest won the prize of having their voice recorded and added to the album version of "Dive into Yourself" (see San). The first press edition of the single came with a wristband selected from a variety of colors. The hook-line is a cover from 2 Unlimited - "Twilight Zone" from 1992.

Sample of the translated lyrics:

Wow...!
I'll break through the clouds
That hang over the sky as it moves
Wow...!
And become a wind
That blows everywhere

== Music video ==
The music video for "Dive into Yourself" first aired on MTV Japan, and was directed by Tomoo Noda. It immediately starts off with the band bouncing around in a garage-like setting, each member playing his or her respective instruments and/or singing. Large lights and screens surround them, and photographers and camera men can be seen taking photos and recording them. Just before the second chorus, Maki starts to walk away from the other band members, all the while, the cord to her microphone uncoiling until it's almost coming out of the socket. Yuusuke finally pulls the cord, forcing the microphone out of Maki's hands, and back to the other members. Maki quickly runs back and grabs the microphone from the ground just in time to sing the chorus after the instrumental break. The video finally ends with Maki yelling, "Perfect!"

== Track list ==
1. "Dive into Yourself" – 3:48
2. "Flying Music" (フライングミュージック) – 3:44
3. "Haitoku no Jounetsu ~Urgent Immoral Passion Mix~" (背徳の情熱 〜Urgent Immoral Passion Mix〜, remixed by 1.DT of Nat) – 5:08
4. "Dive into Yourself (Less Vocal Track)" - 3:46

All songs written by High and Mighty Color.

== Personnel ==
- Maakii & Yuusuke — vocals
- Kazuto — guitar
- Meg — guitar
- Mackaz — bass
- Sassy — drums

== Production ==
- Through – art direction & design
- Hidekazu Maiyama – photographer
- Tsukushi Ichikawa (Mild) – hair & make-up
- Toshio Takeda (Mild) – styling

== TV performances ==
- July, 2006 - Music Express

== Charts ==
Oricon Sales Chart (Japan)

Release	Chart	Peak position	First week sales	Total sales
26 July 2006	Oricon Daily Singles Chart	15		
26 July 2006	Oricon Weekly Singles Chart	24	8,689	16,433
