= Goover =

G∞ver

Studio album by High and Mighty Color
- Released: September 14, 2005
- Recorded: Sound Crew Studio, Sound Inn studio, Yumebangta Studio from Kadena, 3rd Garage Studio, Spice Studio, Hal Aterier
- Genre: Power pop
- Length: 45:16
- Label: SMEJ (Japan), Tofu (US)
- Producer: Hal

High and Mighty Color chronology
G∞ver (2005)	Go On Progressive (2006)

Singles from G∞ver
- 1. "Pride" Released: January 31, 2005; 2. "Over" Released: April 20, 2005; 3. "Run Run Run" Released: June 27, 2005; 4. "Days" Released: August 22, 2005

Professional ratings
Review scores
Source	Rating
IGN	6/10

Go Over (stylized as G∞ver) is the debut album by High and Mighty Color. The album was released in Japan on September 14, 2005, following four supporting singles. It was later released by Tofu Records in the United States on March 21, 2006.

== Overview ==
G∞ver is currently High and Mighty Color's highest selling album. Released just eight months after their debut single, this album was more on the pop side of music rather than the rock side, which their first two singles had showcased. According to an interview with Tofu Records, drummer Sassy revealed that the original version of "Notice" was accidentally deleted, forcing them to record the entire song all over again. Despite this, Sassy states that the re-recorded version exceeded the original with "great groovy sounds".

== Track listing ==
All tracks are written by High and Mighty Color.

No.	Title	Length
1.	"G∞ver"	2:25
2.	"Notice"	4:11
3.	"Pride"	4:18
4.	"Naked"	3:33
5.	"Over"	4:05
6.	"Days"	4:04
7.	"Sweet Escape"	3:44
8.	"Run☆Run☆Run"	4:20
9.	"What for..."	4:28
10.	"Rain"	3:52
11.	"With You"	6:17
Total length:		45:16

== Personnel ==
- Mākii – vocals
- Yuusuke – vocals
- Meg – guitars
- Kazuto – guitars
- Sassy – drums
- Mackaz – bass

== Charts ==
Album - Oricon Sales Chart (Japan)

Release	Chart	Peak position	Sales total
September 14, 2005	Oricon Daily Albums Chart	?	
September 14, 2005	Oricon Weekly Albums Chart	8	50,000+
September 14, 2005	Oricon Yearly Albums Chart	?	

Singles - Oricon Sales Chart (Japan)

Release	Single	Chart	Peak position
January 26, 2005	"Pride"	Oricon Daily Singles Chart	?
January 26, 2005	"Pride"	Oricon Weekly Singles Chart	2
April 20, 2005	"Over"	Oricon Daily Singles Chart	?
April 20, 2005	"Over"	Oricon Weekly Singles Chart	11
June 22, 2005	"Run Run Run"	Oricon Daily Singles Chart	?
June 22, 2005	"Run Run Run"	Oricon Weekly Singles Chart	14
August 17, 2005	"Days"	Oricon Daily Singles Chart	?
August 17, 2005	"Days"	Oricon Weekly Singles Chart	22
