= High and Mighty Color =

Japanese rock band

HIGH and MIGHTY COLOR
- Also known as: H&MC, HandMC, Anti-Nobunaga
- Origin: Okinawa, Japan
- Genres: Alternative rock; nu metal; post-hardcore; power pop
- Years active: 2003–2010
- Labels: Sony Music Japan
- Past members: Yuusuke; Kazuto; Meg; Mackaz; Sassy; Mākii; Halca
- Website: High and Mighty Color

High and Mighty Color (stylized as HIGH and MIGHTY COLOR and abbreviated as H&MC) was a Japanese rock band active from 2003 to 2010. They had two vocalists; a male and a female.

== History ==
=== Formation and Anti-Nobunaga ===
The band started in Okinawa when Sassy and Meg left a Metallica cover band after they decided to make their own music. Sassy offered Mackaz the opportunity to join their new band, he accepted and invited long time friend Kazuto to join as well. Meg sat in on a school performance one day, and Yuusuke's voice stood out to him, so he offered him a chance to join the band. Initially Yuusuke declined due to wanting to be a solo singer, but joined after Meg reportedly asked him to join every day for nearly four months. The band, known as Anti-Nobunaga at this time, played mainly in small coffee shops and art theaters for about a year. Sassy, the bandleader, sent demo tapes to every major Japanese label, all of whom rejected the band. It was not until a small label signed the band that they found their first big break. Anti-Nobunaga were now playing areas further from their local hometown and eventually landed a spot at the yearly music festival of Okinawa.

=== Mākii joins and name change ===
During the summer of 2003, at the yearly music festival in Okinawa, the band's label promoted their spot and eventually they ended up playing for a sold-out crowd. Due to this festival being a "per show" ticket selling one, it meant that Anti-Nobunaga was the only band to play for a sold-out crowd. A scout for a subsidiary of Sony Music Entertainment Japan was in the crowd and offered the band the chance to produce music for an upcoming various artists album entitled Okinawa 2003. The band then composed their two and only completely original songs under the name of Anti-Nobunaga entitled "Meaning" and "Hate You!". At another festival known as the "Music Picnic Festival", vocalist Mākii also grabbed the attention of the same scout that found Anti-Nobunaga. The scout felt that both projects on their own were not remarkable, but combined, the band could be something never before seen on the Japanese music scene. Mākii first rejected the offer due to her wanting to study English abroad, but was later convinced by her future bandmates to watch them perform. After she was impressed by the band's energy, Mākii agreed to join them. With the addition of Mākii the band took on a new name, High and Mighty Color. After six months of perfecting their craft, they moved up from SMJ's minor label to their major label, in league with bands such as Orange Range. High and Mighty Color is some times referred to as the sister band of Orange Range, because they are both from the Okinawa area, an area known for musical fusion thanks in part to various military bases stationed there and were both discovered at the same music festival. They spent much of 2004 writing and recording, in late 2004 they released their first single, "Over" which was only sold through Tower Records stores. It sold out in a month and became immensely scarce, thus it was re-released the next year. The album sat at number one spot of the indie Oricon charts for an entire month.

=== 2005 ===
During 2005, the band released their first major single, "Pride". It was originally going to be attached to a Japanese football event being held at the same time, but was picked up for something else. A Sunrise music partner was looking for a song to use for Mobile Suit Gundam Seed Destiny and "Pride" was chosen to be that song. At the time, the show was the number one rated anime, and being attached to this helped the single's sales immensely. With a final sales count of 223,208 copies, "Pride" remains the band's best selling single of their career.

Over the next year, the band went on a media blitz, performing for shows such as Music Fighter, Music Station and Hey! Hey! Hey! at various times. During August, the band released "Days", their fourth single, selling 7,679 copies and not breaking the top 20 mark on the Oricon charts. Despite this setback, the band was still honored with the Japanese Record Grand Prix's "Rookie of the Year" award, and Mākii's grandmother who had just died was given a tribute just before their performance.

=== 2006: Gou on Progressive ===
In April 2006, the band released their second album Gou on Progressive after only releasing two singles for the album. The album sold less copies than their first album, but it stayed on the Oricon charts longer and managed to gain a higher peak position than their first album. The band's first single of the year was "Ichirin no Hana" and was used as the third opening to the anime adaption of Bleach. This was their first and only single to break the top five mark on the Oricon charts since their debut with "Pride." They also played their first American concert at an anime convention in Houston, Texas on April 28.

The band then went on a large-scale tour of Japan. They played 65 venues over the course of the next five months. They released their seventh single, "Dive into Yourself", in August. The song was used as the opening theme of the video game Sengoku Basara II. For a time this was the band's second lowest selling single and was also their lowest ranking single among the Oricon charts, only managing to reach the 24th spot on the weekly charts. Their 8th single "Enrai ~Tooku ni Aru Akari~" was released on October 25 and used as the ending theme for the third Mobile Suit Gundam Seed Destiny: Special Edition compilation movie. The single entered the charts 12 spots higher than "Dive into Yourself" at number 12. "Energy", a B-side song from the "Style ~Get Glory in this Hand~" single, was used in a tribute compilation album composed for the movie Death Note: The Last Name.

=== 2007: San ===
Mākii made her acting debut with the December 2006 movie, Anata wo Wasurenai (I Won't Forget You). The band performed two songs for the film, "Tadoritsuku Basho", the film's theme song, and "Oxalis", an insert song. The two songs were released as a double A-side single, "Tadoritsuku Basho/Oxalis". When Anata wo Wasurenai was released, it entered the Japanese box offices in the 10th position. Also, "Resistance" was used as the theme song for the Nintendo DS game, Kokui Hirameku Requiem.

On February 4, the official High and Mighty Color website released various 30 second previews of songs from the band's third album, San, which was released on February 21. The album contained 15 tracks with 10 being new releases. The album was ranked number 10 on the Oricon daily rankings during its first day and 16th on the weekly charts.

In March, it was announced that Yūsuke would work with former Porno Graffitti bassist, Masami Shiratama. Yūsuke provided vocals for the joint single entitled "Honnō", the single was released on May 23 featured Yūsuke using what the band describes as his "machine gun vocals".

The band also made their second American performance on May 11 and May 12 during 2007's Anime Central anime convention.

The 10th single from the band was released on August 1, 2007. The title track, "Dreams", was used as the second ending theme to the anime Darker Than Black. During its first week, the single entered the Oricon charts at the 24th spot.

On November 4, 2007, the band announced the release of a single collection album entitled 10 Color Singles featuring their first 10 singles and a bonus track, "Ichirin no Hana (Live Studio Version)". It also includes a DVD with music videos that never made it to DVD like; "Style", "Dreams", "Here I Am", and the new music video for "Mushroom". In December, they contributed to Luna Sea Memorial Cover Album -Re:birth-, covering Luna Sea's song "Rosier".

=== 2008: Rock Pit and Mākii leaves ===
High and Mighty Color's 12th single, "Flashback/Komorebi no Uta", was released on February 27, 2008. It was their second double a-side single and was used in promotion with the anime series Hero Tales. Their 4th album, Rock Pit, was released on March 19 and became their lowest selling album.

The band began the fourth volume of their "Live Bee Loud" tour on March 17, 2008 at the famous Club Quattro in Japan. They then went on to perform at 13 other venues across the country, with the final venue being in their hometown of Okinawa. The 13th single of the band, "Hot Limit", is a cover of one of T.M. Revolution's early singles. The visual style of both the music video and the promotional images is meant to mimic that of the original. This was also the first time since "Dive into Yourself" that Sony Music Entertainment had produced a commercial for advertisement of a single from the band. The single went on to garner the best sales for the band in nearly two years and ranked at number 20 on the Oricon charts in the weekly rankings for its first week.

On July 1, 2008, it was announced that Mākii had married Dreams Come True bassist Masato Nakamura on June 22, 2008 and would be leaving the band by the end of the year. In her parting message, Mākii thanked her fellow band members and all of their fans for supporting her and the group for such a long time. A special event was planned for Mākii's graduation from the band as well as at least one more single. It was also announced that the band will begin searching for a new vocalist in early 2009.

High and Mighty Color appeared at the Zepp in Nagoya, alongside 175R, One Ok Rock and Gollbetty, on August 15 as part of the "Steal The Show Friday Night" lineup. The 14th single from the band, "Remember", was released on October 15, 2008 and is their final single featuring Mākii.

=== 2009: Halca joins and Swamp Man ===
The band transferred to Spice Records on January 1, 2009. Spice Records was an Okinawa based studio that maintained minor rights to the band while under SME. The first live DVD from the band was released on January 25 and reached the 11th spot on the Oricon weekly DVD charts, reaching a peak of 9th on the daily charts. After the departure of Mākii, the band began auditions for a replacement vocalist; the auditions were open to women for a month before call backs and performances were done. On February 9, 2009, the band announced that a replacement vocalist was found, whose information would soon be added to their website after an extensive overhaul. The band planned to begin working on a summer single and live tour to promote the new vocalist in May. The first single, titled "XYZ", featuring the band's new vocalist Halca, was released on iTunes in both Japan and Australia on July 8, 2009.

The band released their fifth album, Swamp Man, on September 2, 2009 and took the 25th spot on the Oricon charts on its release date.

Following the release of the album, High and Mighty Color released a tribute song for two popular manga named "Red". The song was released digitally in Japan on December 9, 2009 and re-released December 23, 2009 on iTunes Japan and Japan Files.

=== 2010: Break up ===
On March 13, 2010, the band performed a live concert titled "Night Light Parade Vol. 1.1: One of the New Beginning" at Shibuya Club Quattro in Tokyo. On April 3, 2010, the band performed at Sakura-Con in Seattle, Washington.

On May 19, it was announced that High and Mighty Color would release a single, "Re:ache", on August 11, which would be the band's last. Explaining the breakup, band members cited "musical differences" and "future opportunities". "Re:ache" contained three new songs, with four songs in total, the fourth being a live rendition of "Red". The single was bundled with a DVD of the music videos for "Re:ache" and "Good Bye", as well as live recordings of their American concert from Sakura-Con 2010.

After the band broke up, the members began separate activities. In 2017, Mackaz and Sassy reunited with Mākii to form the new band DracoVirgo.

== Members ==
- Yuusuke (ユウスケ) – vocals
- Kazuto (カズト) – lead guitar
- Meg – rhythm guitar
- Mackaz – bass
- Sassy – drums, bandleader
- Mākii (マーキー) – vocals (2004–2008)
- Halca – vocals (2009–2010)

== Discography ==
Albums

- G∞ver (2005)
- Go On Progressive (2006)
- San (2007)
- Rock Pit (2008)
- Swamp Man (2009)
