= Enrai (Tooku ni Aru Akari) =

2006 single by High and Mighty Color

"Enrai: Tooku ni Aru Akari"

Single by High and Mighty Color

from the album San
- Released: October 25, 2006
- Genre: J-pop, nu metal
- Length: 13:08
- Label: SMEJ
- Songwriter(s): High and Mighty Color
- Producer(s): Hal

High and Mighty Color singles chronology
"Dive into Yourself" (2006)	"Enrai: Tooku ni Aru Akari" (2006)	"Tadoritsuku Basho/Oxalis" (2007)

"Enrai: Tooku ni Aru Akari" (遠雷 ～遠くにある明かり～) is a single released by High and Mighty Color on October 25, 2006.

== Overview ==
"Enrai: Tooku ni Aru Akari" is the band's eighth single and its last release in 2006. The title track is the third ending theme for the four-part anime feature compilation Mobile Suit Gundam SEED Destiny: Special Edition, and a special ending theme for Mobile Suit Gundam SEED Destiny HD Remaster in 2013. The song also appeared in Drummania/GuitarFreaks V4 as a cover, making the song playable on the arcade machine as well as the compilation album Tokyo Rock City.

The B-side "Kaerimichi no Orenji", was used in a commercial for the Wii game Bleach Wii: Hakujin Kirameku Rondo. The first pressings of the single came with a special pin-up featuring Gundam SEED Destiny main character Athrun Zala. The music video for the song was directed by Sueyoshi Nobu.

== Track listing ==
1. "Enrai: Tooku ni Aru Akari" (遠雷 ～遠くにある明かり) – 4:23
2. "Kaeri Michi no Orenji" (帰り道のオレンジ; Orange Return Trip) – 4:08
3. "Enrai: Tooku ni Aru Akari (Less Vocal Track)" – 4:31

All songs written by High and Mighty Color.

== Personnel ==
- Maakii & Yuusuke — vocals
- Kazuto — guitar
- Meg — guitar
- Mackaz — bass
- Sassy — drums

== Production ==
- Through – art direction & design
- Tom Vezo (Minden Pictures/Amana, cover), Hidekazu Maiyama (members) – photographer
- Tsukushi Ichikawa (Mild) – hair & make-up
- Toshio Takeda (Mild) – styling

== Charts ==
Oricon Sales Chart (Japan)

Release	Chart	Peak position	First week sales	Total sales
25 October 2006	Oricon Daily Singles Chart	12		
25 October 2006	Oricon Weekly Singles Chart	15	11,520	23,742

== GuitarFreaks & Drummania ==
This song is playable as a cover in Drummania/GuitarFreaks V4. It was covered by BeForU member Riyu Kosaka.
