= Mākii =

Japanese musician (born 1987)

- Also known as: MAAKIII, Maki, Markie, Marquee
- Born: Maki Onaga; August 23, 1987 (age 39)
- Origin: Okinawa, Japan
- Genres: Rock
- Occupations: Singer, musician, songwriter
- Instrument: Vocals
- Years active: 2004–2009, 2013–present
- Label: SME Records
- Website: www.handmc.jp, www.maakiii.com

Maki Onaga (翁長麻紀, Onaga Maki; born August 23, 1987), known professionally as Mākii (マーキー), is a Japanese musician who was formerly the vocalist and songwriter for the Okinawa-based band High and Mighty Color. She was the youngest member of the band. She has an older brother who introduced her to the world of music and anime. When she performed at a concert in Okinawa in 2003, a scout for a record label noticed her and Anti Nobunaga. Mākii refused the offer at first, wanting to pursue her career in Canada as a solo artist and to master the English language, but she ultimately joined the band. In 2007, she debuted in her first film, Anata wo Wasurenai.

On July 1, 2008, it was announced that Mākii had married Dreams Come True bassist & producer Masato Nakamura on June 22 and would be leaving the band by the end of 2008. In her parting message, Mākii thanked her fellow band members and all of their fans for supporting her and the group for such a long time.

She resumed musical activities in 2013 under the stage name MAAKIII with her first single "Chokankakutekichikaku" (超感覚的知覚; "extrasensory perception").

In 2017, she formed a new band, DracoVirgo, with several of her former High and Mighty Color band members.

She also voiced one of the racing teams in the video game get REKTorized, which was released on July 7th of 2022.

== Filmography ==
Year	Title	Role
2007	26 Years Diary (Anata wo Wasurenai)	Yuri
