= Pride (High and Mighty Color song) =

Single by High and Mighty Color

from the album G∞ver
- Released: January 31, 2005
- Genre: Pop rock; electronic rock; electronica
- Length: 4:18
- Label: SMEJ
- Songwriters: High and Mighty Color
- Producer: Hal

High and Mighty Color singles chronology
"Pride" (2005)	"Over" (2005)

Alternative cover
- Remix re-release

"Pride" is the debut single of High and Mighty Color and was released on January 26, 2005. A remixed version, titled "Pride Remix" was released on March 24, 2005.

== Information ==
"Pride" is their most successful single in terms of sales to date and was used as the second opening theme for the anime Mobile Suit Gundam SEED Destiny. The single's first press edition included two character identification cards for characters of the anime.

== Remix ==
The single was later released as a remix single featuring various versions of the song done by artists from all ranges of Japanese music. Upon its release the single charted on the 20th spot in Oricon.

== Track listing ==
No.	Title	Length
1.	"Pride"	4:17
2.	""Hikaru Kakera" (光るカケラ; Shards of Light)"	4:20
3.	"All Alone"	5:39
4.	"Pride" (Instrumental)	4:17

== Personnel ==
High and Mighty Color

- Maakii & Yuusuke — vocals
- Kazuto — guitar
- MEG — guitar
- maCKAz — bass
- SASSY — drums

Additional

- Hide2 (Norishrocks) — creative & art direction
- Ryuichi Tamura (Norishrocks) — co-art design
