= Over (High and Mighty Color song) =

Single by High and Mighty Color

from the album G∞ver
- Released: April 20, 2005
- Genre: Alternative rock; hard rock
- Length: 4:02
- Label: SMEJ
- Songwriter(s): High and Mighty Color
- Producer(s): Hal

High and Mighty Color singles chronology
"Pride" (2005)	"Over" (2005)	"Run Run Run" (2005)

"Over" is a single released by High and Mighty Color on April 20, 2005.

== Overview ==
"Over" is the band's single. It was previously released under their independent label, and was known as the "Phantom Single", because only 2,000 copies were made. "Over" was used as the theme song for the TV show "Matthew's Best Hit TV Plus".

== Track list ==
1. "OVER" – 4:02
2. "change" – 3:34
3. "Insomnia" (インソムニア) – 4:40
4. "OVER (Instrumental)" – 4:03

All songs written by HIGH and MIGHTY COLOR.

== Personnel ==
- Maakii & Yuusuke — vocals
- Kazuto — guitar
- MEG — guitar
- maCKAz — bass
- SASSY — drums

== Charts ==
Oricon Sales Chart (Japan)

Release	Chart	Peak position	Sales
20 April 2005	Oricon Daily Singles Chart	1	
20 April 2005	Oricon Weekly Singles Chart	11	52,989
