= Hal (Japanese band) =

Japanese pop band

- Origin: Japan
- Genres: Pop, dance
- Years active: 1996–present
- Label: Avex Trax
- Members: Toshiharu Umezaki (1996-present)
- Past members: Atsushi Sato (1996-2002), Halna (2000-2002), Takehito Shimuzu (2002-2009), Yuta Nakano (2002-2004), Mayuko Maruyamma (2004-2009)

Hal (stylized HΛL, replacing the Latin "A" with the Greek "Λ" or Lambda) is a Japanese pop band formed in 1996. They have worked with several Japanese pop and rock stars and also have won two Japan Record Awards for their musical arrangements for singer Ayumi Hamasaki (with "Free & Easy" in 2002 and "No way to say" in 2003).

== Biography ==
Hal went from music arrangers into a music band and then back to music arrangers, arranging songs for many Japanese artists. Toshiharu Umezaki (sometimes written as Toshiyasu Umezaki) is known as the main member and leader of the band, which had gone through ely digital beat at the edge where the electric guitars are used a lot, as a special feature and typic in their arrangements.

Hal started out as music arrangers in 1996. The first song that they arranged was "Sailor Star Song" by Kae Hanazawa, which was the opening theme for Sailor Moon Sailor Stars. Hal became known especially for the work that they did with Ayumi Hamasaki. "Appears", "Fly High", "M", "Evolution" and "No Way to Say" are some of their most famous tunes with her. They also have worked with some other artists like Ami Suzuki, the KinKi Kids, Every Little Thing and Dream.

In 2000 the group of men did a casting to choose a female vocalist for forming the musical group Hal, which was an idea of Toshiharu Umesaki and Atsushi Sato's. Finally the singer Halna was chosen to be a part of Hal and they signed a deal with record label Avex Trax. They temporarily stopped their group as arrangers after the work with "Grip!" from Every Little Thing.

After the release of seven singles and two studio albums as Hal, the band got separated in 2003 because Halna decided to leave the group and get away from the spotlight, with the release of their final album, called "Singles", a compilation album with all the singles released by the band. Atsushi Sato also withdrew at the same time to arrange music on his own, under the nickname of ats-.

Hal became a production group once again with Takehito Shimizu and Yuta Nakano replacing Sato. Shimizu previously was a session guitarist for Hal when it was a band. Nakano had originally been a remixer for artists such as Ayumi Hamasaki. Nakano left the band in early 2004, and was unofficially replaced by Mayuko Maruyama.

Shimizu and Maruyama left Hal in late 2009. Both eventually signed deals with a music production company named "Blue Bird's Nest", which is a subsidiary of avex.

Currently Umezaki keeps the Hal name active, arranging songs for Japanese singers and music groups.

== Discography ==
HAL's single "The Starry Sky" was the ending theme for the anime Angelic Layer. The Angelic Layer OST also featured another song by HAL, "Justice" including a few remixes of both. HAL's 6th single, "I'll be the One", is the second opening of Hikaru No Go.

=== Singles ===
1. Decide, October 25, 2000
2. Save Me, January 11, 2001
3. Split Up, March 28, 2001
4. The Starry Sky May 23, 2001
5. Al Di La, April 17, 2002
6. I'll Be the One, July 19, 2002
7. One Love / A Long Journey, August 16, 2002

=== Albums ===
- Violation of the Rules, August 29, 2001
- As Long As You Love Me, August 28, 2002
- Singles, February 26, 2003

== DVD ==
- Greatest Hal Clips: Chapter One, April 17, 2002
- One, August 28, 2002
