= List of Bleach soundtracks =

Bleach discography
- The Bleach logo, as seen on many of the series' CD covers
- Soundtrack albums: 9
- Compilation albums: 37
- Singles: 49
- Drama CD: 13
- Rock musical: 3

Bleach is a Japanese manga series written and illustrated by Tite Kubo. Bleach follows the adventures of high school student Ichigo Kurosaki after he obtains the powers of a Soul Reaper (死神, Shinigami; literally, "Death God") from another Soul Reaper, Rukia Kuchiki. The Bleach discography primarily consists of the original soundtrack produced for the Bleach anime adaptation of the manga. The soundtrack was composed by Shirō Sagisu and released in eight volumes and an anniversary box set. Numerous soundtracks have been released in different collections and sets. A series of character song albums, best-of albums composed of the theme songs, rock musical albums, and drama CDs have also been released, all by Sony Music Entertainment Japan.

The Bleach anime opening and ending credits songs have been selected from a diverse group of bands including Orange Range, UVERworld, High and Mighty Color, Beat Crusaders, YUI, Aqua Timez, Asian Kung-Fu Generation, Kelun, SCANDAL, Porno Graffitti, miwa, SID, ViViD, Rie Fu, Home Made Kazoku, Younha, SunSet Swish, Ikimono-gakari, JUNE, Mai Hoshimura, Oreskaband, chatmonchy, RSP, Lil'B, pe'zmoku, Stereopony, Tsuji Shion, Sambomaster, Spyair, Aimer, and many more. Aqua Timez in particular was used for numerous theme songs throughout the course of the production.

Two albums from the series' discography have won Japan Gold Disc Awards in the "Animation Album of the Year" category.

== Compilation albums ==
=== Bleach The Best ===
Year	Title	Charts		Ref.
Year	Title	Peak	Weeks	Ref.
2006	Bleach The Best (Box set): Released: December 13, 2006; CD only version has been re-released on December 17, 2008; Won the 2007 Japan Gold Disc Award in category "Animation Album Of The Year"; Label: Aniplex; Track list: No. / Title / Length; 1. / "*~Asterisk~ (＊～アスタリスク～, Asutarisuku)"; 2. / "Life Is Like a Boat"; 3. / "Thank You!! (サンキュー!!, Sankyū!!)"; 4. / "D-tecnoLife"; 5. / "Hōkiboshi (ほうき星; Comet)"; 6. / "happypeople"; 7. / "Ichirin no Hana (一輪の花; Single Flower)"; 8. / "Life"; 9. / "My Pace (マイペース, Mai Pēsu)"; 10. / "Tonight, Tonight, Tonight"; 11. / "Hanabi"; 12. / "Movin!!"	3	22	
2007	Bleach The Best Instrumental /Jam-set Groove: Released: December 19, 2007; Label: Aniplex; Track list: No. / Title / Length; 1. / "Hanabi (Jazz arrangement)"; 2. / "*~Asterisk~ (＊～アスタリスク～, Asutarisuku) (Jazz arrangement)"; 3. / "Life Is Like a Boat (Jazz arrangement)"; 4. / "Tonight, Tonight, Tonight (Jazz arrangement)"; 5. / "Hōkiboshi (ほうき星; Comet) (Jazz arrangement)"; 6. / "happypeople (Jazz arrangement)"; 7. / "Ichirin no Hana (一輪の花; Single Flower) (Jazz arrangement)"; 8. / "Thank You!! (サンキュー!!, Sankyū!!) (Jazz arrangement)"	—		
2008	Bleach Best Tunes (Box set): Released: December 17, 2008; Won the 2009 Japan Gold Disc Award in category "Animation Album Of The Year"; Label: Aniplex; Track list: No. / Title / Length; 1. / "Rolling Star"; 2. / "Baby It's You"; 3. / "Sakura Biyori (桜日和; Cherry Blossom Weather)"; 4. / "Alones"; 5. / "Tsumasaki (爪先; Tiptoe)"; 6. / "Daidai (橙; Bitter Orange)"; 7. / "After Dark (アフターダーク, Afutādāku)"; 8. / "Tane o Maku Hibi (種をまく日々; The Days When Seeds Are Scattered)"; 9. / "Kansha. (感謝。; Appreciation.)"; 10. / "Chu-Bura"; 11. / "Orange (オレンジ, Orenji)"; 12. / "Gallop (ギャロップ, Gyaroppu)"; 13. / "Sen no Yoru wo Koete (千の夜をこえて; Beyond a Thousandth Nights)"; 14. / "Hikari no Rock (光のロック; Rock Of Light)"	4	17	
2010	Bleach Berry Best: Released: December 1, 2010; Label: Aniplex; Track list: No. / Title / Length; 1. / "Velonica"; 2. / "Hitohira no Hanabira (ヒトヒラのハナビラ; A Single Petal Piece)"; 3. / "Sky Chord ~Otona ni Naru Kimi e~ (Sky Chord ～大人になる君へ～; Sky Chord (To The Adult You))"; 4. / "Shōjo S (少女S; Girl S)"; 5. / "Kimi o Mamotte, Kimi o Aishite (君を守って君を愛して; I Protect You, I Love You)"; 6. / "Mad Surfer"; 7. / "Anima Rossa (アニマロッサ)"; 8. / "Sakurabito (さくらびと; Cherry Blossom's Man)"; 9. / "Tabidatsu Kimi e (旅立つキミへ; Leaving You)"; 10. / "Change"; 11. / "Stay Beautiful"; 12. / "Echoes"; 13. / "Koyoi, Tsuki ga Miezu Tomo (今宵、月が見えずとも; Even If You Can't See the Moon Tonight)"	7	14	
2012	Bleach Best Trax (Box set): Released: April 25, 2012; Label: Aniplex	4	11	

=== Bleach Concept Album ===
Year	Title	Charts		Ref.
Year	Title	Peak	Weeks	Ref.
2010	Bleach Concept Covers: Released: December 15, 2010; Label: Aniplex	33	10	
2011	Bleach Concept Covers 2: Released: December 14, 2011; Label: Aniplex	18	5	

=== Bleach Character Song ===
==== Beat Collection ====
Year	Title	Charts		Ref.
Year	Title	Peak	Weeks	Ref.
2005	Bleach Beat Collection - Ichigo Kurosaki: Released: June 22, 2005; Label: Sony Music Entertainment	92	3	
2005	Bleach Beat Collection - Renji Abarai: Released: July 20, 2005; Label: Sony Music Entertainment	43	3	
2005	Bleach Beat Collection -`Uryu Ishida: Released: August 24, 2005; Label: Sony Music Entertainment	60	2	
2005	Bleach Beat Collection - Hanataro Yamada & Kon: Released: October 19, 2005; Label: Sony Music Entertainment	52	2	
2005	Bleach Beat Collection - Gin Ichimaru: Released: December 21, 2005; Label: Sony Music Entertainment	32	4	
2006	Bleach Beat Collection 2nd Session 01 - Ichigo Kurosaki & Zangetsu: Released: May 3, 2006; Label: Aniplex	61	2	
2006	Bleach Beat Collection 2nd Session 02 - Toushiro Hitsugaya/Rangiku Matsumoto/Momo Hinamori: Released: June 7, 2006; Label: Aniplex	51	3	
2006	Bleach Beat Collection 2nd Session 03 - Kenpachi Zaraki/Yachiru Kusajishi/Ikkaku Madarame/Yumichika Ayesegawa: Released: August 2, 2006; Label: Aniplex	67	2	
2006	Bleach Beat Collection 2nd Session 04 - Jin Kariya/Ririn/Kuroud/Noba: Released: October 4, 2006; Label: Aniplex	97	2	
2006	Bleach Beat Collection 2nd Session 05 - Rukia Kuchiki & Orihime Inoue: Released: December 20, 2006; Label: Aniplex	94	3	
2007	Bleach Beat Collection The Best 1: Released: March 21, 2007; Label: Aniplex	81	3	
2007	Bleach Beat Collection 3rd Session 01 - Ulquiorra: Released: June 6, 2007; Label: Aniplex	75	2	
2007	Bleach Beat Collection 3rd Session 02 - Grimmjow Jaegerjaques: Released: June 6, 2007; Label: Aniplex	57	2	
2007	Bleach Beat Collection 3rd Session 03 - Sousuke Aizen: Released: August 1, 2007; Label: Aniplex	96	1	
2007	Bleach Beat Collection 3rd Session 04 - Kaname Tosen: Released: October 3, 2007; Label: Aniplex	158	1	
2007	Bleach Beat Collection 3rd Session 05 - Nel Tu: Released: December 19, 2007; Label: Aniplex	185	1	
2008	Bleach Beat Collection 3rd Session 06 - Szayelaporro Grantz: Released: March 5, 2008; Label: Aniplex	91	2	
2008	Bleach Beat Collection 4th Session 01 - Byakuya and Rukia: Released: May 21, 2008; Label: Aniplex	84	2	
2008	Bleach Beat Collection 4th Session 02 - Jushiro and Kaien: Released: July 16, 2008; Label: Aniplex	75	2	
2008	Bleach Beat Collection 4th Session 03 - Syusuke and Makoto: Released: September 24, 2008; Label: Aniplex	177	1	
2008	Bleach Beat Collection 4th Session 04 - Ichigo and Rukia: Released: December 17, 2008; Label: Aniplex	91	1	
2009	Bleach Beat Collection 4th Session 05 - Mayuri and Nemu: Released: March 18, 2009; Label: Aniplex	138	1	
2009	Bleach Beat Collection The Best 2: Released: March 18, 2009; Label: Aniplex	160	2	

==== Breathless Collection ====
Year	Title	Charts		Ref.
Year	Title	Peak	Weeks	Ref.
2009	Bleach Breathless Collection 01 - Ichigo Kurosaki with Zangetsu: Released: September 30, 2009; Label: Aniplex	109	1	
2009	Bleach Breathless Collection 02 - Rukia Kuchiki with Sode no Shirayuki: Released: October 21, 2009; Label: Aniplex	126	1	
2009	Bleach Breathless Collection 03 - Renji Abarai with Zabimaru: Released: November 25, 2009; Label: Aniplex	175	1	
2009	Bleach Breathless Collection 04 - Tōshirō Hitsugaya with Hyōrinmaru: Released: December 16, 2009; Label: Aniplex	85	2	
2010	Bleach Breathless Collection 05 - Shūhei Hisagi with Kazeshini: Released: February 24, 2010; Label: Aniplex	70	3	
2010	Bleach Breathless Collection 06 - Byakuya Kuchiki with Senbonzakura and Muramasa: Released: March 3, 2010; Label: Aniplex	75	2	

== Singles ==
=== TV Animation ===
==== Opening themes ====
Year	Title	Artist	Charts		Ref.
Year	Title	Artist	Peak	Weeks	Ref.
2005	"*~Asterisk~" (＊～アスタリスク～, Asutarisuku): Released: February 23, 2005; Label: gr8! records; Used as opening theme for episodes 1–25	Orange Range	1	22	
2005	"D-tecnoLife": Released: July 6, 2005; Label: gr8! records; Used as opening theme for episodes 26–51	UVERworld	4	31	
2006	"Ichirin no Hana" (一輪の花; "Single Flower"): Released: January 11, 2006; Label: SME Records; Used as opening theme for episodes 52–74	High and Mighty Color	2	14	
2006	"Tonight, Tonight, Tonight": Released: September 6, 2006; Label: Defstar Records; Used as opening theme for episodes 75–97	Beat Crusaders	7	8	
2007	"Rolling Star": Released: January 17, 2007; Label: Studioseven Recordings; Used as opening theme for episodes 98–120	Yui	4	16	
2007	"Alones": Released: August 1, 2007; Label: Epic Records; Used as opening theme for episodes 121–143	Aqua Timez	3	15	
2007	"After Dark" (アフターダーク, Afutādāku): Released: November 7, 2007; Label: Ki/oon Music; Used as opening theme for episodes 144–167	Asian Kung-Fu Generation	6	15	
2008	"Chu-Bura": Released: July 2, 2008; Label: SME Records; Used as opening theme for episodes 168–189	Kelun	20	5	
2009	"Velonica": Released: January 14, 2009; Label: Epic Records; Used as opening theme for episodes 190–214	Aqua Timez	2	10	
2009	"Shōjo S" (少女S; "Girl S"): Released: June 17, 2009; Label: Epic Records; Used as opening theme for episodes 215–242	SCANDAL	6	13	
2009	"Anima Rossa" (アニマロッサ): Released: November 25, 2009; Label: SME Records; Used as opening theme for episodes 243–265	Porno Graffitti	3	13	
2010	"Change": Released: September 1, 2010; Label: SME Records; Used as opening theme for episodes 266–291	Miwa	8	7	
2010	"Ranbu no Melody" (乱舞のメロディ, Ranbu no Merodi; "Melody of the Wild Dance"): Released: December 1, 2010; Label: Ki/oon Music; Used as opening theme for episodes 292–316, also used as the theme song for Bleach: Soul Resurrección	SID	5	13	
2011	"BLUE": Released: July 13, 2011; Label: Epic Records; Used as opening theme for episodes 317–342	ViViD	4	8	
2012	"HARUKAZE": Released: February 22, 2012; Label: Epic Records; Used as opening theme for episodes 343–366	SCANDAL	6	6	

==== Ending themes ====
Year	Title	Artist	Charts		Ref.
Year	Title	Artist	Peak	Weeks	Ref.
2004	"Life Is Like a Boat": Released: September 23, 2004; Label: Palm Beach; Used as ending theme for episodes 1–13	Rie fu	32	18	
2005	"Thank You!!" (サンキュー!!, Sankyū!!): Released: January 26, 2005; Label: Ki/oon Music; Used as ending theme for episodes 14–25	Home Made Kazoku	15	16	
2005	"Hōkiboshi" (ほうき星; "Comet"): Released: June 1, 2005; Label: Epic Records; Used as ending theme for episodes 26–38	Younha	15	17	
2005	"Happypeople": Released: September 7, 2005; Label: SME Records; Used as ending theme for episodes 39–52	Skoop On Somebody	23	4	
2005	"Life": Released: November 9, 2005; Label: Sony Music Records; Used as ending theme for episodes 53–63	Yui	9	13	
2006	"My Pace" (マイペース, Mai Pēsu): Released: March 1, 2006; Label: Sony Music Records; Used as ending theme for episodes 64–74	SunSet Swish	6	24	
2006	"Hanabi": Released: May 31, 2006; Label: Epic Records; Used as ending theme for episodes 75–86	Ikimono-gakari	5	9	
2006	"Movin!!": Released: July 12, 2006; Label: Epic Records; Used as ending theme for episodes 87–97	Takacha	62	4	
2006	"Baby It's You": Released: November 15, 2006; Label: Sony Music Records; Used as ending theme for episodes 98–109	June	49	2	
2007	"Sakura Biyori" (桜日和; "Cherry Blossom Weather"): Released: March 7, 2007; Label: SME Records; Used as ending theme for episodes 110–121	Mai Hoshimura	20	7	
2007	"Tsumasaki" (爪先; "Tiptoe"): Released: May 9, 2007; Label: Sony Music Associated Records; Used as ending theme for episodes 122–131	Oreskaband	44	2	
2007	"Daidai" (橙; "Bitter Orange"): Released: September 5, 2007; Label: Ki/oon Music; Used as ending theme for episodes 132–143	Chatmonchy	12	7	
2007	"Tane o Maku Hibi" (種をまく日々; "The Days When Seeds Are Scattered"): Released: November 14, 2007; Label: Epic Records; Used as ending theme for episodes 144–153	Kōsuke Atari	22	8	
2008	"Kansha." (感謝。; "Appreciation."): Released: February 6, 2008; Label: Sony Music Records; Used as ending theme for episodes 154–167	RSP	25	7	
2008	"Orange" (オレンジ, Orenji): Released: June 18, 2008; Label: Defstar Records; Used as ending theme for episodes 168–179	Lil'B	28	5	
2008	"Gallop" (ギャロップ, Gyaroppu): Released: July 9, 2008; Label: Defstar Records; Used as ending theme for episodes 180–189	Pe'zmoku	59	6	
2008	"Hitohira no Hanabira" (ヒトヒラのハナビラ; "A Single Petal Piece"): Released: November 5, 2008; Label: Sony Music Records; Used as ending theme for episodes 190–201	Stereopony	25	13	
2009	"Sky Chord ~Otona ni Naru Kimi e~" (Sky Chord ～大人になる君へ～; "Sky Chord (To The Adult You)"): Released: February 25, 2009; Label: Defstar Records; Used as ending theme for episodes 202–214	Shion Tsuji	44	4	
2009	"Kimi o Mamotte, Kimi o Aishite" (君を守って君を愛して; "I Protect You, I Love You"): Released: June 10, 2009; Label: Sony Music Records; Used as ending theme for episodes 215–229	Sambomaster	34	4	
2009	"Mad Surfer": Released: August 26, 2009; Label: BMG Japan; Used as ending theme for episodes 230–242	Kenichi Asai	23	6	
2010	"Sakurabito" (さくらびと; "Cherry Blossom's Man"): Released: January 13, 2010; Label: SME Records; Used as ending theme for episodes 243–255	SunSet Swish	11	6	
2010	"Tabidatsu Kimi e" (旅立つキミへ; "Leaving You"): Released: March 10, 2010; Label: Sony Music Records; Used as ending theme for episodes 256–265	RSP	47	3	
2010	"Stay Beautiful": Released: May 12, 2010; Label: SME Records; Used as ending theme for episodes 266–278	Diggy-MO'	29	3	
2010	"Echoes": Released: August 4, 2010; Label: Defstar Records; Used as ending theme for episodes 279–291	Universe	60	2	
2010	"Last Moment": Released: December 1, 2010; Label: Sony Music Artists; Used as ending theme for episodes 292–303	Spyair	43	6	
2011	"Song For...": Released: March 2, 2011; Label: Defstar Records; Used as ending theme for episodes 304–316	ROOKiEZ is PUNK'D	91	2	
2011	"Aoi Tori" (アオイトリ; "Blue Bird"): Released: June 8, 2011; Label: Ariola Japan; Used as ending theme for episodes 317–329	Fumika	50	2	
2011	"Haruka Kanata" (ハルカカナタ; "Far Away"): Released: September 7, 2011; Label: Sony Music Records; Used as ending theme for episodes 330–342	UNLIMITS	45	3	
2011	"Re:pray": Released: December 14, 2011; Label: Defstar Records; Used as ending theme for episodes 343–354	Aimer	41	3	
2012	"MASK": Released: February 22, 2012; Label: Epic Records; Used as ending theme for episodes 355–366	Aqua Timez	10	4	

=== Movie ===
Year	Title	Artist	Charts		Ref.
Year	Title	Artist	Peak	Weeks	Ref.
2006	"Sen no Yoru wo Koete" (千の夜をこえて; "Beyond a Thousandth Nights"): Released: November 22, 2006; Label: Epic Records; Used as the theme song for Bleach: Memories of Nobody	Aqua Timez	5	22	
2007	"Hikari no Rock" (光のロック; "Rock Of Light"): Released: December 12, 2007; Label: Sony Music Records; Used as the theme song for Bleach: The DiamondDust Rebellion	Sambomaster	24	8	
2008	"Koyoi, Tsuki ga Miezu Tomo" (今宵、月が見えずとも; "Even If You Can't See the Moon Tonight"): Released: December 10, 2008; Label: SME Records; Used as the theme song for Bleach: Fade to Black	Porno Graffitti	2	15	
2010	"Save the One, Save the All": Released: December 1, 2010; Label: SME Records; Used as the theme song for Bleach: The Hell Verse	T.M. Revolution	4	9	

== Soundtracks ==
=== TV Animation ===
Year	Title	Ref.
2005	TV Animation Bleach Original Soundtrack 1: Released: May 18, 2005; Label: Aniplex	
2005	TV Animation Bleach Original Soundtrack 2: Released: August 2, 2006; Label: Aniplex	
2008	TV Animation Bleach Original Soundtrack 3: Released: November 5, 2008; Label: Aniplex	
2009	TV Animation Bleach 5th Anniversary Box: Released: July 29, 2009; Label: Aniplex	
2009	TV Animation Bleach Original Soundtrack 4: Released: December 16, 2009; Label: Aniplex	
2022	SHIRO'S SONGBOOK BLEACH Bankai! (Note: SHIRO'S SONGBOOK BLEACH Bankai! is a solo release by Shirō Sagisu, part of his long-running "SHIRO'S SONGBOOK" series of albums, and is not officially part of the Bleach original soundtrack. Nevertheless, tracks from this album are used as regular background music in the Thousand-Year Blood War anime and are not found on other soundtrack releases.): Released: December 14, 2022; Label: Aniplex	
2023	TV Animation BLEACH THE BLOOD WARFARE Original Soundtrack Ⅰ: Released: September 27, 2023; Label: Aniplex	
2024	TV Animation BLEACH THE BLOOD WARFARE Original Soundtrack ⅠⅠ: Released: December 18, 2024; Label: Aniplex	

=== Movie ===
Year	Title	Ref.
2006	Bleach The Movie Memories Of Nobody Original Soundtrack: Released: December 13, 2006; Label: Aniplex	
2007	Bleach The Movie The DiamondDust Rebellion Original Soundtrack: Released: December 19, 2007; Label: Aniplex	
2008	Bleach The Movie Fade to Black Original Soundtrack: Released: December 10, 2008; Label: Aniplex	
2010	Bleach The Movie The Hell Verse Original Soundtrack: Released: December 1, 2010; Label: Aniplex	

== Rock musical ==
Aniplex has released three albums featuring songs from the musical Rock Musical Bleach.

Year	Title	Charts		Ref.
Year	Title	Peak	Weeks	Ref.
2006	Rock Musical Bleach Live: Released: June 7, 2006; Label: Aniplex	—		
2007	Rock Musical Bleach - The Dark Of the Bleeding Moon Live: Released: February 21, 2007; Label: Aniplex	130	1	
2008	Rock Musical Bleach: Released: August 6, 2008; Label: Aniplex	48	3	

== Drama CD ==
Bleach drama CDs have been produced featuring the original voice actors. Drama CDs have only been included as part of the DVD (Limited Edition) releases.

Year	Title	Ref.
2005	"Shinigami Daikō Hen: Dorama CD 1" (死神代行篇:ドラマCD1; "Agent of the Shinigami Chapter: Drama CD 1"): Released: February 2, 2005; Label: Aniplex	
2005	"Sōru Sosaeti Sennyū Hen: Dorama CD 2" (尸魂界・潜入篇:ドラマCD2; "Soul Society - The Sneak Entry Chapter: Drama CD 2"): Released: July 27, 2005; Label: Aniplex	
2005	"Sōru Sosaeti Kyūshutsu Hen: Dorama CD 3" (尸魂界 救出篇:ドラマCD3; "Soul Society - The Rescue Chapter: Drama CD 3"): Released: December 21, 2005; Label: Aniplex	
2006	"Baunto Hen: Dorama CD 4" (バウント篇:ドラマCD4; "The Bount Chapter: Drama CD 4"): Released: May 24, 2006; Label: Aniplex	
2007	"Baunto Sōru Sosaeti Kyōshū Hen: Dorama CD 5" (バウント・尸魂界強襲篇:ドラマCD5; "The Bount - Assault on Soul Society Chapter: Drama CD 5"): Released: April 25, 2007; Label: Aniplex	
2007	"Arankaru Shutsugen Hen: Dorama CD 6" (破面・出現篇:ドラマCD6; "Arrancar - The Arrival Chapter: Drama CD 6"): Released: June 27, 2007; Label: Aniplex	
2007	"Arankaru Weko Mundo Sennyū Hen: Dorama CD 7" (破面・虚圏 潜入篇:ドラマCD7; "Arrancar - The Hueco Mundo Sneak Entry Chapter: Drama CD 7"): Released: December 19, 2007; Label: Aniplex	
2008	"Arankaru Gekitō Hen: Dorama CD 8" (破面・激闘篇:ドラマCD8; "Arrancar - The Fierce Fight Chapter: Drama CD 8"): Released: May 28, 2008; Label: Aniplex	
2008	"Shin Taichō Amagai Shūsuke Hen: Dorama CD 9" (新隊長天貝繍助篇:ドラマCD9; "The New Captain Shūsuke Amagai Chapter: Drama CD 9"): Released: November 26, 2008; Label: Aniplex	
2009	"Arankaru VS. Shinigami Hen: Dorama CD 10" (破面･VS.死神篇:ドラマCD10; "Arrancar vs. Shinigami Chapter: Drama CD 10"): Released: May 27, 2009; Label: Aniplex	
2010	"Arankaru Karakura Kessen Hen: Dorama CD 11" (破面・空座決戦篇:ドラマCD11; "Arrancar - Battle of Karakura Chapter: Drama CD 11"): Released: January 27, 2010; Label: Aniplex	
2010	"Zanpakutō Ibun Hen: Dorama CD 12" (斬魄刀異聞篇:ドラマCD12; "Zanpakutō - The Alternate Tale Chapter: Drama CD 12"): Released: May 26, 2010; Label: Aniplex	
2011	"Zanpakutō Ibun Hen: Dorama CD 13" (斬魄刀異聞篇:ドラマCD13; "Zanpakutō - The Alternate Tale Chapter: Drama CD 13"): Released: January 26, 2011; Label: Aniplex	
