= List of Bobobo-bo Bo-bobo episodes =

Bobobo-bo Bo-bobo
- Key visual of the series.
- Native name
- Kanji: ボボボーボ・ボーボボ
- Revised Hepburn: Bobobōbo Bōbobo
- No. of episodes: 76

Release
- Original network: TV Asahi
- Original release: November 8, 2003 – October 29, 2005

Bobobo-bo Bo-bobo is an anime television series based on the manga series of the same name. The series was directed by Hiroki Shibata and produced by Toei Animation. It ran for 76 episodes, from November 8, 2003, to October 29, 2005, on TV Asahi.

Joy Tashjian Marketing Group, a licensing representative named by Toei Animation, licensed the anime in North America. Preview clips of the series were aired during Cartoon Network's "Summer 2005 Kick-Off Special" in May 2005, and the series premiered on September 30. The series also aired on Cartoon Network's Toonami programming block on Saturdays at 9–10 p.m., starting on October 1. Additionally, it was available on Cartoon Network's broadband service, Toonami Jetstream, from November 5, 2007, until the service's closure in January 2009. In the United Kingdom, it premiered on Jetix on April 16, 2007.

== Theme Music ==
For episodes 1–32, the opening theme is "Wild Challenger" by the Japanese rock band Jindou, and the ending themes are "Shiawase" (幸せ; Happiness) by artist Mani Laba and "Kirai Tune" (キライチューン; Hate Tune) by Freenote. For episodes 33–76, the opening theme is "Baka Survivor" (バカサバイバー; Stupid Survivor) by Ulfuls, and the ending theme is "H.P.S.J." by urban pop duet Mihimaru GT.

== Episode list ==
No.	Title	Original release date	English air date
1	"The Bo-nafide Soulful Bo-tector of Hair" / "Written as "Soul of Hair", Wants to be Read as "Sparkling"..."; Transliteration: "'Ke tamashī' to kaite 'supākuringu' to yoma setai..." (Japanese: 【毛魂】と書いて"スパークリング"と読ませたい...)	8 November 2003	30 September 2005
In the year 300X, the diabolical Czar Baldy-Bald IV proclaims a hair hunt throughout his Chrome Dome Empire, forcing everyone under his rule to be as bald as him. In the midst of this, a rebel with a golden afro emerges: Bobobo-bo Bo-bobo'. This episode introduces Bo-bobo, along with the pink-haired Beauty (who comes along on his adventures) and Pickles (who is never seen again after this episode), along with several mysterious characters.
2	"Let's Get Wiggy With It" / "Written as "Tears of Hair", Should be Read as "Sentimental"; Transliteration: "'Ke namida' to kaite 'senchimentaru' to yonde hoshī..." (Japanese: 【毛涙】と書いて"センチメンタル"と読んでほしい...)	15 November 2003	8 October 2005
Due to circumstances in the last episode, Bo-bobo faces off against the orange star-shaped Wiggin Don Patch in a Christmas-themed Wiggin battle (involving a story about churros), but when Beauty gets abducted by a group of wig-wearing Hair Hunters, the two of them must join together to confuse them. Weirdness regarding vegetables and joining in on the villain's date ensues. With Beauty abandoned to the Hair Hunters, she is saved by a mysterious white-haired boy.
3	"Wacky Quacker Cooks His Own Goose" / "26-Year-Old Duck Underwear"; Transliteration: "26-sai no ahiru pantsu saa~!" (Japanese: 26歳のアヒルパンツさぁー!)	22 November 2003	15 October 2005
Leaving Don Patch behind, Bo-bobo and Beauty head to a Wig-Out Festival, where the audience discovers the value of giant burger costumes and why dynamite should never play the stock market. The duo then encounters a Hair Hunter who wears underwear with a duck sticking out of the front of it.
4	"Bababa-ba Ba-baba! The Honorable King Nosehair" / "Bababa-ba Ba-baba! The Great King Nosehair?"; Transliteration: "Bababāba bābaba! Idainaru kingu hanage-sama?" (Japanese: バババーバ·バーババ!偉大なるキング鼻毛様?)	29 November 2003	22 October 2005
Don Patch is ready to go out on his own to join Bo-bobo and Beauty, but first he has to finish "Wiggin' School", where Bo-bobo isn't making his last day easier. Then as the three continue their journey (and drive each other crazy), they face off against a water-logged Hair Hunter that can read minds and are forced to witness the revival (and quick abandonment) of the legendary king of the nose hairs.
5	"To Be or Snot to Be" / "Sushi and Bunny Girls? Ultimate Attack! Ochazuke Beam!!"; Transliteration: "Sushi to banīgāru? Hissatsu! Ochadzuke bīmu!!" (Japanese: 寿司とバニーガール?必殺!お茶漬けビーム!!)	6 December 2003	29 October 2005
Bo-bobo and Don Patch decide to throw a play in the middle of the woods where the plot becomes more bizarre with each scene. They find themselves under siege by a green tentacle alien in search of a boy (who is familiar to Beauty) and with a power that leads to an unstoppable craving for rice soup. After an underwater battle and an unexpected finale, Bo-bobo brings the creature down, without knowing that he works for an even more foreboding opponent.
6	"Pasta... the Perfect Food!" / "Dreadful Ultimate Secret Somen Shinken! Ko-n-ni-chi-wa!"; Transliteration: "Osorubeshi kyūkyoku ōgi sōmen ma ken! Ko n ni chi ha!!" (Japanese: 恐るべし究極奥義ソーメン真拳!コ·ン·ニ·チ·ハ!!)	13 December 2003	12 November 2005
Continuing the journey to another city, Bo-bobo tries to master a new technique from a famed pasta maker and witnesses wooden spoons making wooden spoons. When Beauty is attacked with a "hair-loss beam" from a Hair Hunter from C-Block, the heroes must begin a new journey to save her, save the day, and figure out why Don Patch's weapons are all green onions.
7	"Queen Chicken Level and the Video Store of Dumb" / "The 10th Miss Chicken Queen Niwako and the Mysterious Guard Softon"; Transliteration: "Dai 10 kai Misu niwatori Kuīn niwako to nazo no bannin Sofuton" (Japanese: 第10回ミスにわとりクィーンにわ子と謎の番人ソフトン)	20 December 2003	19 November 2005
Crash landing inside C-Block Tower, Bo-bobo and Don Patch begin an upward battle against the local Hair Hunters, learning along the way about dental hygiene, poultry pageants, and the importance of having two video stores on top of each other. But that's before they find out their next mysterious opponent, who has interesting taste in headgear.
8	"We All Scream for Ice Cream!" / "The Release of Soul is... Piro-Piro-Piro-Piro-Pirochi!"; Transliteration: "Tamashi no Kaihō sore wa, Piro-Piro-Piro-Piro-Pirochi!" (Japanese: 魂の解放それは、ピロピロピロピロ... ピロッチ!)	10 January 2004	26 November 2005
Bo-bobo faces off against Softon', the fourth-floor guardian who says he's strawberry soft serve. While he claims to care about Beauty's welfare, Softon also has an unstoppable arsenal of techniques and the abilities of the goddess Blabs-a-Lot, but that's before Bo-bobo unleashes Bo-bobo World on him.
9	"Gasser Up! I'm Ready to Drive!" / "The Mysterious Boy's True Form and Fart Shinken! Eat Asparagus!"; Transliteration: "Nazo no Shōnen no Shōtai to Onara shinken! Asupara Kuttoke!" (Japanese: 謎の少年の正体とオナラ真拳!アスパラ食っとけ!)	17 January 2004	3 December 2005
Finally reaching the top of C-Block Tower, the heroes face off against Geha the Gale (even though Beauty's already been saved). When Bo-bobo and Don Patch are blown away, a new challenger makes his presence known: Gasser, master of the "Fist of the Backwind" and the boy that has been watching Beauty all this time (though his appearance doesn't explain why Bo-bobo turns into a leopard).
10	"Protect the Environment... Something Stinks in Here!" / "Protect! The Earth's Environment: The Password is Fart Puppu-: There's No Smell~!"; Transliteration: "Mamore! Chikyū Kankyō Aikotoba wa Onarapuppū Kusakunai!!" (Japanese: 守れ!地球環境 合言葉はおならプップー 臭くな〜い!!)	24 January 2004	10 December 2005
A giant wall monster emerges from out of nowhere in C-Block Tower, with the objective of capturing Gasser and stealing his "Fist of the Backwind". But Bo-bobo sees a bigger problem: Gasser's ultimate technique is powerful enough to destroy life on Earth as they know it, which is why he and Don Patch make fun of the battle in progress.
11	"A Bird in the Hand Can Play Chicken But Still Smell Fowl!" / "'The Crane's Gratitude' of Betrayal and Greed The Passage is VE~RY!"; Transliteration: "Uragiri to yokubō no "Tsuru no Ongaeshi" sono setu wa dōmo!" (Japanese: 裏切りと欲望の"ツルの恩返し"その節はド〜モ!)	31 January 2004	17 December 2005
With Gasser now a part of his team, Bo-bobo decides to teach him a few things about fighting. The first lesson: how to defeat an opponent without using his own special technique. But when that fails after a battle with a Hair Hunter, his education moves to the "Nosehair Dojo", where beating up fish and fighting old women (and one old man) are on the curriculum.
12	"The Weally Wobbly World of Bo-bobo's Foe: General Jelly Jiggler!" / "The Strong Enemy That Jiggles Appears! His Name is Tokoro Tennosuke"; Transliteration: "Purunpurun shite iru kyōteki shutsugen! Sononaha Tokoro Tennosuke" (Japanese: ぷるんぷるんしている強敵出現!その名はところ天の助)	7 February 2004	7 January 2006
Gasser's education continues while Bo-bobo and Don Patch defend chopsticks from a thieving pencil case. A new amusement park mysteriously appears, controlled by the leader of A-Block, Jelly Jiggler. With a friend of Bo-bobo's (who has never appeared prior to this) being held captive and forced to eat spaghetti against his will, it's up to the heroes to fight (and have fun while they're doing it).
13	"Bo-bobo's Rappin' Roller Coaster Ride" / "Enraged Snapshot! 24-Hour Amusement Park: The Revealed Hippos Black Curtain!"; Transliteration: "Gekisatsu! Yūenchi 24-ji abaka reta kaba no kuromaku!" (Japanese: 激撮!遊園地 24時 暴かれたカバの黒幕!)	7 February 2004	14 January 2006
With Jelly Jiggler somewhere in the park, the team searches A-Block and gets into mischief: Bo-bobo rides a monkey train almost taken over by rabbits, Don Patch reunites with an old boyfriend that's now by-the-numbers, Gasser beats up more fish and Beauty watches a cat eat with utensils. There is also a roller coaster rap about turtles.
14	"Haunted HollowBo-bobo" / "Marriage in the Haunted House: Mama, Papa I Will Be Very Happy..."; Transliteration: "Obakeyashi de kekkonshiki papa mama atashi shiawase ni narimasu..." (Japanese: お化け屋敷で結婚式 パパママ あたし幸せになります...)	21 February 2004	21 January 2006
While searching inside a haunted house, Gasser finds out he's marrying Bo-bobo. He is also stuck fighting A-Block vice-leader Katsu, who can counter abilities with smiley-face absorption. But with the Hair Hunter's accessories collection incomplete and Bo-bobo fending off his own nose-hair fist, things take a turn for the strange.
15	"General Jelly Jiggler: Supreme Hair Enemy or Dastardly Dessert?" / "Secret of Purupuru Shinken! Tokoroten Gun Explosion! But There's no Tas~te"; Transliteration: "Purupuru ma ken ōgi! Tokoro ten teppō sakuretsu! Demo aji gana~i" (Japanese: プルプル真拳奥義!ところ天鉄砲炸裂!でも味がな〜い)	28 February 2004	28 January 2006
Gasser's true power (and mental side effects) are finally revealed against Katsu, while the search for Jelly Jiggler comes to a climax as Bo-bobo finally faces off against the blue jelly man and his "Fist of the Wobble-Wobble". But when Bo-bobo should be fighting his greatest enemy, all he can do is eat him.
16	"Snot in My Neighborhood!" / "Farewell My Greatest Enemy: Tokoro Tennosuke! Good Evening My New Enemy: Dengakuman!"; Transliteration: "Saraba saikyō no teki tokoroten'nosuke! Konbanwa aratana teki dengaku man!" (Japanese: さらば最強の敵 ところ天の助!こんばんは新たな敵 田楽マン!)	6 March 2004	4 February 2006
Bo-bobo and Don Patch's come together (literally) for a final assault on Jelly Jiggler, but after, they decide to join the Hair Hunters. While both are in competition for a position, Bo-bobo's abilities in front of fans may put him at an advantage over bad seed Don Patch's ability to play a stick of butter. But the two of them don't know that there are a couple of enemies keeping a close eye on them.
17	"The Ducktail Versus Afro Showdown" / "Regent vs Afro: The Eternal Rival's Pure-Hearted School!"; Transliteration: "Rīzento VS afuro eien no raibaru junjō-ha!" (Japanese: リーゼントVSアフロ 永遠の宿敵(ライバル)純情派!)	13 March 2004	11 February 2006
Bo-bobo encounters his greatest rival: Captain Battleship, the ducktailed master of a personal "Fist of the Nosehair" style, but Gasser somehow knows who he is. They don't know why he's fighting against other Hair Hunters if he himself is a Hair Hunter elite, and what exactly he wants now outside running around as an octopus?
18	"Beauty is in the Eye of her Holder" / "Infiltration! Gunkan's Stronghold: The Great Spy Operation!"; Transliteration: "Sen'nyū! Gunkan no yōsai suppai dai sakusen!" (Japanese: 潜入!軍艦の要塞 スッパイ大作戦!)	3 April 2004	18 February 2006
The heroes finally reach Puppu City, Gasser's hometown and the current ruined home of Battleship's Pomade Ring' headquarters (and where Beauty's being held hostage). They face the Pomade Ring's army, a fish-loving second-in-command, floating heads, disgruntled businessmen, masked warriors who can't count, and Serviceman.
19	"The Entangled Nose Hair of Destiny: Who Will Pass the Test?" / "The Entangled Nosehair of Destiny: This Comes in the Next Test!"; Transliteration: "Karamaru shukumei no hanage! Koko-ji no tesuto ni demasu!" (Japanese: 絡まる宿命の鼻毛!ここ次のテストに出ます!)	3 April 2004	25 February 2006
With saving Beauty still on their minds, Bo-bobo and the team prepare for one-on-one fights with the Battleship Five Quartet (who are six). Gasser fights first, having to go through a masked school filled with friends, enemies and sumo wrestlers until encountering an old ally turned rival. Then, Bo-bobo takes on a calendar who's afraid of losing all its pages, but it may not be the real enemy.
20	"World of Blabs-a-Lot: The Sappiest Place on Earth" / "New World Travel Guide!! I Saw Bo-bobo's Weakness in the Backwoods of Babylon!"; Transliteration: "Sekai shin kikō! Babiron no okuchi ni bōbobo no jakuten o mita!" (Japanese: 世界新紀行!バビロンの奥地にボーボボの弱点を見た!)	1 May 2004	4 March 2006
Bo-bobo, Don Patch and King Nosehair confuse the second member of the Battleship Five Quartet, but after the results of that battle (and following battles by Don Patch and Jelly Jiggler), Softon sends Bo-bobo off to the mysterious World of Blabs-a-Lot to receive special training and get rid of his weakness. He ends up running around with a bunch of chicken-headed tour guides and expelling fruit from yogurt, and then faces the mysterious last member of Battleship's masked warriors, having the right attack to take care of him.
21	"Good-bye Bo-bobo! The Final Showdown?" / "Farewell Bo-bobo! The Final Nosehair Battle!! But This Isn't the End~!"; Transliteration: "Saraba bōbobo! ? Saishū hanage kessen! Demo saishūkai jana〜i!" (Japanese: さらばボーボボ!?最終鼻毛決戦!でも最終回じゃな〜い!)	8 May 2004	11 March 2006
Back from his training trip (and after helping out in a carpentry lesson), Bo-bobo has his ultimate showdown with Captain Battleship, upon which the ducktailed warrior's sordid past and the truth of his hatred towards Bo-bobo is finally revealed. With bones flying, robots destroying, and ultimate attacks ranging from nosehairs to armadas to orange boxes, the two Fist of the Nosehair masters fight until one is left standing at the end, and a new character appears.
22	"Hatenko the Hunk Has the Key to Your Heart" / "Enter the Mysterious Cool Guy! He'll LOCK Up Your Heart!!"; Transliteration: "Nazo no ikemen tōjō! Kimi no hāto o LOCK suru!!" (Japanese: 謎のイケメン登場!キミのハートをLOCKする!!)	15 May 2004	18 March 2006
Hatenko, a mysterious former ally of Bo-bobo from the Hair Kingdom, finally catches up with him to criticize his current status and stop anyone in his way. Everyone then learns of his obsessive devotion to his great "sun", Don Patch. Kitty-Poo, the second of the Baldy-Bald Big Four, comes along to finish what Battleship started (and to make fun of Dragon Ball). But he underestimates Don Patch and Kitty-Poo and co-horts are each defeated by Don Patch in one attack.
23	"Weddings, Wiggins and Water Torture" / "Welcome to Evil Blood Mansion! The Returned Duck Underwear--!!"; Transliteration: "Yōkoso yokoshima chi-kan e! Kaettekita ahiru pantsu saa!!" (Japanese: ようこそ邪血館へ!帰ってきたアヒルパンツさぁー!!)	29 May 2004	25 March 2006
Hatenko leads the group towards the Evil House of Blood, as if they were invited to a reception for Czar Baldy Bald's wedding. Instead, they're forced to go through several obstacles such as a returning Hair Hunter villains, allies turned into mind slaves, exploding cell phone assassins, brainwashed Bo-bobo soup, and the importance of wearing fashionable raincoats. With doubts going through Gasser's mind about his true purpose, all Don Patch wants is the power to win as well as a much buffer body.
24	"The Terrifying Z-Block Is Here!" / "Arrival at the Terrifying Z-Block Base! The Ocean! A Quiz! Forgiveness Mask!!"; Transliteration: "Kyōfu no Z burokku kichi shutsugen! Umida! Kuizu da! Yurushite kamenda!!" (Japanese: 恐怖のZブロック基地出現!海だ!クイズだ!許して仮面だ!!)	5 June 2004	8 April 2006
Bo-bobo and team finally arrive near Z-Block Base, from where cute leader Dengaku Man has been taunting them for a while now. To get to it, they must first get through a beachfront entrance with a powerful robot team, who are just as good with beach volleyball as they are with asking for forgiveness. Once they make it inside the main headquarters, they must go through a game show where the questions and contests get weirder by the second.
25	"The New Bo-bobo with the Old Bo-bobody" / "Birth! NEW Bo-bobo WITH Fishcake: Father is Doing His Best!"; Transliteration: "Tanjō! Nyū Bōbobo WITH hanpen otōsan wa ganbatte iru zo!" (Japanese: 誕生!NEWボーボボ WITH ハンペン お父さんは頑張っているゾ!)	12 June 2004	15 April 2006
As their Z-Block trials continue, Bo-bobo and Don Patch go inside a giant TV and face off against a villain who can shine a light on them. The horrific secret of Z-Block is revealed, Gasser and Beauty get stuck in a crowd of chefs, and Bo-bobo dies after revealing himself to be a vampire. A strange black-haired Bo-bobo arrives with the power of fishcake and the ability to turn into a dragon, and unleashes yet another Z-Block warrior! Beauty goes temporarily insane, on the level of Don Patch and Bo-BoBo.
26	"Dengaku Man, Pixie or Pit Bull—He'll Love You or Hate You!" / "Once More, the Ultimate Enemy! Dengakuman!! How Many Friends Can He Make?"; Transliteration: "Futatabi saikyō no teki! Dengaku man!! Tomodachi nanijin dekiru ka na?" (Japanese: 再び最強の敵!田楽マン!!友だち何人できるかな?)	19 June 2004	29 April 2006
The little Z-Block leader Dengaku Man finally emerges to take on Bo-bobo and Don Patch, showing off just as many Wiggin abilities as the heroes. Amidst the honey butter, flag waving, and aeronautical potstickers, the enemy is just lonely and wants someone to be his friend, and Bo-bobo luckily may know some people.
27	"Luck Let a Wiggin See...How Nice a Hanky Can Be!" / "Hair Raising! The Legendary Hajike Base!! I've Already Wiped My Tears with the Handkerchief of "Nu"..."; Transliteration: "Senritsu! Densetsu no Hajike kichi!! Mō namida o o fuki "nu" no hankachi de" (Japanese: 戦慄!伝説のハジケ基地!!もう涙をお拭き「ぬ」のハンカチで...)	10 July 2004	6 May 2006
With Bo-bobo defeating him at every turn, Czar Baldy-Bald authorizes the re-opening of Wiggin Block, where some of the most powerful (and insane) warriors reside. To take it down, Bo-bobo and the team must go through a base onslaught of ice-cream loving assassins, dolphin shows, strange space travelers, tea ceremonies, transforming birds, and the return of a jiggly ally and a brand "nu" lucky hanky.
28	"Mortal Match! Fist of Nose Hair vs. Fist of Rice!" / "Death Match! Hanage Shinken vs. Kome Shinken!! Be Friends and Don't Fight♪"; Transliteration: "Shitō! Hanage ma ken VS Amerika ma ken!! Nakayoku kenka-shina ♪" (Japanese: 死闘!鼻毛真拳VS米真拳!!仲良くケンカしな♪)	17 July 2004	13 May 2006
Continuing through Wiggin Block, Bo-bobo and the ragtag group are forced into a cat-and-mouse chase against an honorable mouse samurai who has issues with toilet seats. Then, they encounter Rice, a so-called King of Wiggin Specialists with a grudge against Don Patch and a bowl of full-grain attacks. With Beauty captured and facing a bizarre fate, Bo-bobo, Don Patch, and Jelly Jiggler (and maybe Gasser) are forced to face down the "Fist of Rice" master by throwing fruit at him and using friends as protective shields.
29	"Instant Rice – Ready in Half an Hour?" / "Bo-bobo and Rice's 30-Minute Cooking! Madam, What Do You Want from Tonight's Menu?"; Transliteration: "Bō-bobo & raisu no 30-bu kukkingu! Okusama, kon'ya no menyū ni ikaga?" (Japanese: ボーボボ&ライスの30分クッキング!奥様、今夜のメニューにいかが?)	24 July 2004	20 May 2006
As a thirty-minute dinnertime Wiggin spectacular, Rice unleashes his full power as the King of Wiggin Specialists, complete with back rubs, ballerina tutus, poison apples, a king outfit, and carbo-loaded fury. Bo-bobo wants the title from Rice, Don Patch turns down the title and has a transformation of his own, Jelly Jiggler has his new line of party supplies, and Beauty becomes a panda.
30	"Revenge is a Dish Best Served Cold with Shiitake Mushroom Sauce" / "Elemental Ninja Castle! Lips to Ruby to a Pig's Butt...What Anime is This?!"; Transliteration: "Fūun ninja-jō! Kuchibiru ni rubī ni buta no oshiri tte don'na anime ja!!" (Japanese: 風雲忍者城!クチビルにルビーにブタのおしり...ってどんなアニメじゃ〜!!)	7 August 2004	27 May 2006
Just when the fight for the title King of Wiggin Specialist is finished, a big-mouthed ninja assassin arrives to challenge Bo-bobo to take on his master, the horrific OVER of the Baldy-Bald Big Four. After Bo-bobo and the others get past his tricks, he sends them to the entrance with a flying duck-loving warrior to face and Serviceman hanging by a limb. Beyond that is a force of The Ultimate Five Assassins to get past, the first of which is a playful little girl.
31	"The Ultimate Five Assassins vs. Bo-bobo All-Stars!" / "The Killer 5 Ninshu vs. Bo-bobo All Stars! Baby He-kun Runs Wild Too! Babu♥"; Transliteration: "Hissatsu go shinobu shuu VS Bōboboō rusutāzu! Akachan hekkun mo dai bōsō!" (Japanese: 必殺五忍衆VSボーボボオールスターズ!赤ちゃんへっくんも大暴走!バブ♥)	4 September 2004	3 June 2006
Continuing through OVER's Castle, the heroes face a soccer-themed villain who has no connection to soccer. Gasser causes a stink over the fight which causes eventual lawsuits they cause. Then they face off against an incompetent trap master who is almost victorious (prior to the return of a cute little Wiggin). This leads to a showdown against the last three assassins on top of a giant toilet where some can get trapped inside.
32	"Enter BoboPatchiggler! Is That How It's Spelled?" / "Go! Bobopatchnosuke! In a Bicycle!!!...Seriously!?"; Transliteration: "Ike! Bobo Patchi no suke! Mamachari de!!!... Majide!?" (Japanese: 行け!ボボパッチの助!ママチャリで!!!...マジで!?)	4 September 2004	10 June 2006
Facing off against a team of ancient cultures that knows how to work together, Bo-bobo shows how little he, Don Patch and Jelly Jiggler work together outside of beating each other (and Dengaku Man) up. With time running out and facing the elite teamwork (and curling technique) of the ninja assassins, the trio (literally) come together to form the triple fusion Bobopatchiggler, which unleashes the power of Majide Time.
Special	"Thanks for Waiting! Remodelled Grand Opening!! It's Finally Come, the Patchmi Era ♥"; Transliteration: "Omatase! Shinsō kaiten!! Tsuini kita no ne, pachi bi no jidai ga ♥" (Japanese: お待たせ!新装開店!!遂に来たのね、パチ美の時代が♥)	23 October 2004	Unaired
In a special recap episode, the cast members of the series (as well as a female fan that looks just like the main protagonist) come together to figure out who the new main character of the series is going to be. Don Patch keeps seeing strange visions on his crystal ball of an enemy they're about to take on once the discussion is. After everything is straightened out, BoboPatchiggler reverts everything back to the cliffhanger of the previous episode.
33	"It Ain't OVER 'Til the Fat Lady Sings" / ""OVER! I'll Defeat You!" Said Tokoro Tennosuke-!!!"; Transliteration: "OVER! Temē wa ore ga buttaosu! Tte ten no suke ga ittemashita!!!" (Japanese: OVER!テメーはオレがぶっ倒す!って天の助が言ってました〜!!!)	30 October 2004	17 June 2006
Finally at the top of the castle, the heroes face the tyrannical OVER, who challenges Bo-bobo, Don Patch and Jelly Jiggler to an all-out cannon-flying showdown where the losers get crushed by metallic bear traps. While being thrown through the sky, gnawed by metal teeth, and trashed by giant scissors, the trio (particularly Jelly Jiggler) can't stop making the bad guy angry at their shenanigan. When he's angry enough times, it seems like it's game over.
34	"Torpedo Girl: Man or Myth? Or Mythes?" / "Sorry for the Extremely Long Wait Everyone! Finally Introduced! Gyourai Girl!!"; Transliteration: "Minasama taihen nagaraku o mata se itashimashita! Tsuini tōjō! Gyorai gāru!!" (Japanese: 皆様大変永らくお待たせ致しました!遂に登場!魚雷ガール!!)	6 November 2004	24 June 2006
OVER's true form is unepexectedly revealed to be Torpedo Girl, a legendary Joke Killer who smashes into anyone who cracks a bad joke. With Bo-bobo, Don Patch and Jelly Jiggler being bashed around every other line (and Dengaku Man not at all), the trio come together for an all-out attack to put a stop to this ultimate enemy. Not even the Fist of the Nose Hair can stop this threat, because she's a torpedo.
35	"King Nose Hair Presents: "The Follicle Follies of the Future"" / "Gyourai Girl!! In the Name of the Earth, I'll Judge You♪"; Transliteration: "Gyorai gāru yo!! Chikyū ni kawatte o sabaki yo ♪" (Japanese: 魚雷ガールよ!!地球にかわってお裁きよ♪)	13 November 2004	1 July 2006
Torpedo Girl takes a quick trip to Bo-bobo World, but not even the insanity there is able to stop her stubborn joke-hating. Bo-bobo unleashes his most powerful attack: the judgement of the nine planets of the Solar System, the greatest powers of the universe. This may be enough to stop the torpedo, but it takes a little more nosehair thrust to finally put a stop to OVER. While all seems happy, Captain Battleship's assistant Suzu is about to lead them on a new path.
36	"Next Stop...Holy Guacamole Land!" / "Advance Departure to Hallelujah Land! Hell Up Ahead!?"; Transliteration: "Hareruya Rando e shuppatsu shinkō! Konosaki wa jigoku!?" (Japanese: ハレルヤランドへ出発進行!この先は地獄!?)	20 November 2004	8 July 2006
Bo-bobo and company take a train to Holy Guacamole Land, the theme park base of the greedy Halekulani. With six tickets and seven potential passengers, Jelly must travel al fresco. An official assassin attacks him and Bo-bobo on the boxcars, leading to an all-night battle. By the time their journey is done, several tunnels have been smashed through and a UFO has been blown up, and all they get for their journey is a sash.
37	"Holy Guacamole Land Isn't Just For Breakfast Anymore" / "Great Rage at Hallelujah Land! Everyone's Become Children♪"; Transliteration: "Hareruya Rando de dai abare! Min'na kodomo ni natchi ~yaimachita ♪" (Japanese: ハレルヤランドで大暴れ!みんな子供になっちゃいまちた♪)	27 November 2004	22 July 2006
Bo-bobo and the others safely arrive in Holy Guacamole Land, but soon realize the danger of a park where attractions can blow up. Everyone finds refuge in the "Kids Area", where everyone can relive their childhood, and Bo-bobo, Don Patch and Jelly can create their own rock band. There is an adult villain in the park that can make them relive their worst nightmares, but the kid fighters still have fun and fuse into a badly drawn warrior!
38	"Money Castle! Cash Only Please. Credit Cards Not Accepted" / "Start the Attack on Money Castle! But Let's Drop in on the Way!"; Transliteration: "Manēky assuru e totsugeki kaishi! Demo tochū de yorimichi sa sete!" (Japanese: マネーキャッスルへ突撃開始!でも途中で寄り道させて!)	4 December 2004	29 July 2006
Though Bo-bobo and the others should be making their way to Money Castle and Halekulani, they split up in the middle of the park. A Few Dangerous Thugs lurk about around the attractions while Bo-bobo and Jelly face off against a long-nailed freak and Suzu does her worst Don Patch impersonation. Don Patch fights in a show where he's the hero and a villainous cyborg can't predict any of his insane moves.
39	"The Terrible Triplets Versus the Wiggin' Trio!" / "Decisive Battle! The Three Prison-Murderer Brothers vs. Hajike Trio! Which Has Better Teamwork!?"; Transliteration: "Kessen! Goku ya 3 kyōdai VS hajiketorio! Chīmuwāku wa dotchiga-jō!?" (Japanese: 決戦!獄殺3兄弟VSハジケトリオ!チームワークはどっちが上?)	11 December 2004	5 August 2006
Bo-bobo's team takes on the Terrible Triplets (who look nothing alike) for the sake of Beauty and Suzu, who are stuck under the stench of fatal gum. The Bo-bobo team unleashes goddesses, slaps them around with seaweed, unleashes powerful whirlwinds (slightly inspired by another series), and shows just as much teamwork as their competition.
40	"The Fall of Halekulani! And the Winter of Discontent!" / "Overthrow Halekulani! And Afterwards Lets Take His Money♪"; Transliteration: "Datō harekurani! Son'na koto yori okane o hiroou ♪" (Japanese: 打倒ハレクラニ!そんなことよりお金を拾おう♪)	8 January 2005	12 August 2006
Now that the brother Haou has become more powerful, Bo-bobo unleashes a special attack to bring him and his brothers down: a roulette where any of them (or his allies) can be smashed, struck by ninjas, or turned into shōjo characters! Then, there is still Halekulani, who has an impenetrable money field that can transform anyone into currency.
41	"The Magical Battle Against Halekulani!" / "Gorgeous Showdown with Halekulani! See, Our Super Illusion!!"; Transliteration: "Harekurani to gōjasu taiketsu! Miyo, sūpā iryūjon!!" (Japanese: ハレクラニとゴージャス対決!見よ、スーパーイリュージョン!!)	15 January 2005	19 August 2006
Halekulani faces off against Bo-bobo's team, where he reveals the power of his rich "Fist of Gorgeousness", through which bills can become phoenixes, knights can come out of coins, and teammates can become coins. As Bo-bobo, Don Patch and Jelly break through his attacks, the villain takes them to a board game where his asset growth leads to jewel-encrusted torture, and Bo-bobo keeps rolling the rhino of fate.
42	"Bo-bobo Braves the Board Game that's Berry, Berry Bothersome" / "Fun Sugoroku in March! We'll Do A Service Altogether♪"; Transliteration: "Omoshiro sugoroku hatsudō! Min'na sorotte sābisu shi chau ♪" (Japanese: おもしろスゴロク発動!みんなそろってサービスしちゃう♪)	22 January 2005	26 August 2006
Bo-bobo decides to take over Halekulani's board game, creating a game where aliens exist in haunted houses, fish are used for massaging, and he controls all movement. While the enemy seems down for the count, Halekulani reveals the true power of money, unleashing his ultimate power and an arsenal of trillions.
43	"Ha-le Oo-pu Ah-ah!" / "Final Battle with Halekulani: The Final Conclusion...We Thought Until a New Enemy!?"; Transliteration: "Harekurani saishū kessen tsuini ketchaku! ...to omottara aratana teki!?" (Japanese: ハレクラニ最終決戦 遂に決着!...と思ったら新たな敵!?)	29 January 2005	2 September 2006
Bo-bobo reveals the secret behind what's more important than money: boring everyday life, as revealed through a seven-day schedule wherein he eats crab, conquers Japan, blows up planets, runs around with ghosts, and stops Halekulani once and for all. Gasser gets abducted by the forces of Cyber City, where the powerful Giga awaits him. The team sets off to rescue their ally.
44	"The Seriously Circular Skirmish in Cyber City" / "Appear the Six Electric Brain Warriors! The Male Ballerina are Enchanting Too♥"; Transliteration: "Den'nō 6 toukishi sanjō! Otoko barerīna mo mise chaimasu [hāto]" (Japanese: 電脳6闘騎士参上!男バレリーナも魅せちゃいます♥)	6 February 2005	9 September 2006
With assistance from Torpedo Girl, Bo-bobo's team makes their way to Cyber City, where they immediately find themselves on the broadcast of an insane, wheel-headed assassin. With Gasser missing and Jelly turned into a sausage, Bo-bobo will go through anything to take him down. With one down, there's still five of The Six Cyber Knights left to go.
45	"Begin the Bungie Battle! Last One Down is a Rotten Egg!" / "Invitation to the Depths of Hell!? Decisive Sky Battle! Start the Bungee Battle!!"; Transliteration: "Naraku no soko e go shōtai!? Kūchū kessen! Banjī batoru kaishi!!" (Japanese: 奈落の底へご招待!?空中決戦!バンジーバトル開始!!)	13 February 2005	16 September 2006
Preparing to encounter the remainder of the Cyber Knights, Bo-bobo's team is seized by a warrior who fights in a rebounding bungee fight with two pathetic sidekicks: a karate rabbit with bad spelling and a depressed man who loves cookies. When the heroes realize all their efforts lead to a bottomless pit, Bo-bobo covers it with a "Mystery Box" where no one knows what they'll fall into.
46	"Libraries and Driving Tests!" / "Messenger of Justice from the Darkness!? Female-Torpedo Teacher Gyorābē Appears!!"; Transliteration: "Yami kara no seigi no shisha!? Gyorai jokyōshi gyo rabe kenzan!!" (Japanese: 闇からの正義の使者!?魚雷女教師ぎょら〜べ〜見参!!)	20 February 2005	23 September 2006
Bo-bobo watches in anger as Gasser is turned into Giga's latest masterpiece, but is thrown for a loop when Torpedo Girl splits the team up towards two separate Cyber Knights. She, Don Patch and Jelly take on a writer who controls language. Meanwhile, Bo-bobo and Softon take a crash course in driver's ed with a car-headed teacher and Dengaku Man behind the wheel.
47	"A Battle of Skills and Wills with One Green Onion. Or Is It Garlic?" / "Violent Sink-or-Swim Battle!! Onion-san comes Too♪"; Transliteration: "Ichi ka bachi ka no gekiretsu batoru!! Tamanegi-san mo deru yo ♪" (Japanese: イチかバチかの激烈バトル!!タマネギさんも出るよ♪)	27 February 2005	30 September 2006
An attempt by one enemy to wipe everyone's memories falls flat when he realizes Don Patch has no mind. Bo-bobo finishes up his fight while showing off further rage at Giga. The team (minus Dengaku Man) is reunited by J, a mysterious onion/garlic headed warrior who controls Cyber City with the mysterious power of the Black Sun. While Softon has found an honorable opponent but he finds himself quickly defeated by the mustached fighter's technique.
48	"Silly Singing Saves the Show from a Sinister Scoundrel" / "Enter Magical☆Girl Denbo-chan! The Love Spell is Gabapavich!?"; Transliteration: "Majikaru ☆ gāru denbo-chan tōjō! Koi no jumon wa Gabapabitchi!?" (Japanese: マジカル☆ガール田ボちゃん登場!恋の呪文はガバパビッチ!?)	6 March 2005	7 October 2006
While J continues to throw out action poses, Softon tips Bo-bobo on how to defeat him. An attempt to end him is thrown off as Bo-bobo and Dengaku Man become the beautiful female singing idol Denbo. After a quick nunchaku tenderization of the onion, she unleashes an unstoppable sing-along show where the lyrics come to life, the villain gets drowned in jelly and beta-carotene and bossed around by a senate candidate and the fusion woman.
49	"The Battle of Brains Begins!" / "Extremely Difficult? IQ Battle Begins! Giga, Come and Get It~!!"; Transliteration: "Chō nankai? IQ batoru kaishi! Giga yo, kakatte koi ya!!" (Japanese: 超難解?IQバトル開始!ギガよ、かかってこいや〜!!)	13 March 2005	4 November 2006
With the fall of all of his minions, Giga finally invites Bo-bobo's team to take him on in a battle where art where they are smashed around by his artworks. After they wheel around his defenses and consistently hit on his female minions, he ups the ante in a brain battle, predicting all of the Wiggin warriors moves. A bit of Dengaku Man finally lets Bo-bobo throw him off but Giga's fist technique has yet to be used.
50	"Giga Goes Gaga! Alarming Attacks with Impressive Art" / "Enraged Seal: Super Giga Appears! We've Been Double-Crossed♥"; Transliteration: "Abaka reta fūin-chō (sūpā) giga shutsugen! Boku-tachi sotchi ni negaerimasu ♥" (Japanese: 暴かれた封印 超ギガ出現!ボク達そっちに寝返ります♥)	20 March 2005	25 November 2006
After turning Bo-bobo's team into Giga's works, courtesy of his servants, the Cyber City leader unleashes the full power of his Obujé de Art, throwing Bo-bobo against a wall of sound (until Torpedo Girl helps them break it), then forcing the team up a flight of deadly steps with masterpieces being thrown after them. After a combination of teamwork and a horizontal elevator lets Bo-bobo's team get closer to victory, Giga unleashes his full power by breaking all of his hard work.
51	"The Art of Art and the Fist of All Fists!" / "Art Power vs. Nosehair Soul! Eat This! Hajike Trio Burning Fist!!"; Transliteration: "Geijutsu pawā VS (bāsasu) hanage tamashī! Kurae! Hajike Torio no atsuki tekken!!" (Japanese: 芸術パワーVS鼻毛魂!くらえ!ハジケトリオの熱き鉄拳!!)	27 March 2005	17 February 2007
In his super form, Giga resists all of Bo-bobo's attacks by literally becoming the art that he has fused with. Bo-bobo's squad finds their way around it by showing him the power of the art of the everyday (and the power of a bull market). With Giga preparing for his greatest accomplishment, destroying Gasser, Bo-bobo is forced to release the seal of his Nosehair Soul, gathering the power of dragons and using Don Patch and Jelly to help in revealing his manliness and burning desire to finally bring down Giga.
52	"Gasser's Back! A Whole New Season, Same Old Stench! / Don Patch! The Man, the Myth, the Mouth!" / "Welcome Back, He-kun♪ A New Journey's Starting, Starting~! / The New Enemy Has Come! Bridge-Top Death Match!!"; Transliteration: "O kaeri hekkun ♪ aratana tabi no hajimari hajimari! / Kichatta atarashī teki! Hashi no ue de no desu matchi!!" (Japanese: お帰りへっくん♪新たな旅の始まり始まり〜! / 来ちゃった新しい敵!橋の上でのデスマッチ!!)	9 April 2005	24 February 2007
Gasser and Softon return to the team and Torpedo Girl goes her own way, and Bo-bobo's team continues on their journey. When the team crashes into a platoon of Hair Hunters from one hundred years ago, they end up in a massive bridge-top melee with teamwork attacks, changing weather conditions, and a battleground that can be opened. The villains still have one purpose in particular: to take out the remains from the Hair Kingdom.
53	"Dancin' and Trainin' for Quickly Obtainin' the Enemy's Painin' / A Rose by Any Other Name Would Be Called Something Else!" / "Everyone Power Up! The New Costume is 582 Yen? / The Enemy is Our Horrible Ancestor? Even The Power-Up Is Use〜less!!"; Transliteration: "Min'na de pawā appu! Shin kosuchūmu wa 582-en? / Teki wa sai kyō no go senzo-sama? Pawā appu mo yakunitachimase!!" (Japanese: みんなでパワーアップ!新コスチュームは582円? / 敵は最凶のご先祖様?パワーアップも役に立ちませ〜ん!!)	16 April 2005	10 March 2007
After throwing aside the remaining Hair Hunters (and giving them a jelly gift pack), Bo-bobo's team heads to a legendary training ground (a shopping mall) to prepare for the threat of more old Hair Hunters. They soon meet their match in a flower-throwing general who's as ruthless as he is good at taking out powered-up warriors. Bo-bobo prepares to take him on, with a jacket that cost $27.50 at a supermarket.
54	"The War of the Roses...or Lilacs...or Daffodils / Someone Get Me Out of This Hot Whirlpool!" / "Let's Go Super Bo-bobo! He'll Demonstra~te The Love Power♪ / Euphoric Battle in the Flower Garden! The Smell of Flowers is the Smell of Death?"; Transliteration: "Ike sūpā Bōbobo! Ai no chikara hakki shicha imasu ♪ / Ohanabatake de runrun batoru! Ohana no kaori wa shi no kaori?" (Japanese: 行けスーパーボーボボ!愛の力発揮しちゃいま〜す♪ / お花畑でルンルンバトル!お花の香りは死の香り?)	23 April 2005	24 March 2007
Bo-bobo attempts to fight against the floral Wild Wister, but none of his tricks to work on the plant master. When he remembers his recent training, the true Super power of his new jacket is released, defending against the flower menace and planting seeds of annoyance (and Don Patch's former girlfriends) before planting Wister where he can never return. The true threat of the former empire prepares for its awakening.
55	"The Gang's All Here! And Boy, Are They Weird! / Rivalist Factions and a Cool Robot Action with a Cherry on Top!" / "Awaited Hatenko♪ Factions Made and Allies Split!? / Gadget-kun Advances Wildly! Thrusting Away Both Enemies and Allies!!"; Transliteration: "Omatase hatenkō ♪ habatsu tsukutte nakamaware!? / Susume bōsō ga jetto-kun! Teki mo mikata mo tsukitobase!!" (Japanese: おまたせ破天荒♪派閥作って仲間割れ!? / 進め暴走ガジェット君!敵も味方も突き飛ばせ!!)	30 April 2005	14 April 2007
With Hatenko returning to lead the way, Bo-bobo's team pummels an army of Hair Hunters to find the base of the Former block leaders: an amusement park on the ruins of Jelly Jiggler's old base. Their first challenge is a living bowl of ice cream who forces them to fight his team while running away from a runaway robot. With Bo-bobo, Hatenko and Jelly (nearly) in unison, they are able to stand fast while getting run over.
56	"The Ultimate SF Battle! Supreme Fisticuffs or Certain Free-for-All! / All Aboard! The Nightmare Tour is About to Begin!" / "Dress Change and Decisive Sci-Fi Battle! See! Our New Trio!! / Impossibly Predicted World Tour! Now Depart~ing in The Love-Love Wagon!!"; Transliteration: "Doresuchenji de SF kessen! Miyo! Warera shin torio!! / Yosoku funō no sekai tsuā! Raburabu wagon de iza de hatsu!!" (Japanese: ドレスチェンジでSF決戦!見よ!我ら新トリオ!! / 予測不能の世界ツアー!ラブラブワゴンでいざ出〜発!!)	7 May 2005	21 April 2007
Changing to a more team-intensive strategy, Not Nice Cream's fight with the power of SF, but a renewed focus on teamwork (and a raid of a villainous space station) lets Bo-bobo's team regain control. One act of selfishness by the former Block Leader inspires Bo-bobo and Jelly to put their enemies on a chaotic world tour.
57	"The Water Slide That's Bona Fide to Leave You Terrified! / Our Torpedo Hero Fights a Commando Like a Tornado!" / "Hell Water Slider! The Enemy! Swishing Sunfish and Swimsuit Gals!? / Assault Love-Love Torpedo-sensei! I Won't Forgive Joking Guy~s!!"; Transliteration: "Jigoku no uōtā suraidā! Teki wa! Pichi pichi manbou ni mizugi gyaru!? / Totsugeki rabu rabu gyorai sensei! Fuzaketa yatsu wa yurusanai!!" (Japanese: 地獄のウォータースライダー!敵は!ピチピチマンボウに水着ギャル!? / 突撃 ラブラブ魚雷先生! ふざけた奴は許さな〜い!!)	14 May 2005	5 May 2007
At the next park attraction, Bo-bobo finds himself trying to save Beauty and Don Patch from a tough (but incompetent) soldier in a waterslide where he keeps throwing out traps while being comforted by his female assistants. The soldier's attempt at summoning his ultimate weapon to finish off his opponent forces him to face a very angry Torpedo Girl whom Bo-bobo uses to turn against her summoner, even though she's a torpedo who can't swim.
58	"Face the Cold Hard Facts! It's Freezing in Here! / Chill Out, Brussel Sprout! We're Gonna Put This Fight on Ice!" / "Ice-Top Machine Battle! The Great Fierce Battle With No Rules! / The Penalty Game is on Ice: But It's Cold Baby-!!"; Transliteration: "Hikami no mashin batoru! Rūru muyō de dai gekisen! / Batsu gēmu wa kōri-dzuke sorya tsumetai ze beibī!!" (Japanese: 氷上のマシンバトル!ルール無用で大激戦! / 罰ゲームは氷づけ そりゃ冷たいぜベィビー!!)	21 May 2005	12 May 2007
Continuing to the ice skating rink, the Wiggin Trio face off in a massive mech showdown where their choice in battle gear is extremely unconventional and Jelly is nearly killed by his own vehicle. When the wind-sickle carrying Master Jeda blows allies away and forces Jelly into refrigeration, Bo-bobo and Don Patch are forced to fuse again, but the result isn't what they expect.
59	"Enemy Crusin' for a Brusin? Then Just Try Fusion" / "Wiggin' Fusion PatchBobo! The Serious Battle Without Foolishness!? / Fierce Fight! Love Triangle!! Euphoric Merry-Go-Round Battle!?"; Transliteration: "Hajike gattai Patchi Bobo! O fuzake-nashi no gachinko batoru!? / Gekitō! Koi no sankaku kankei!! Merī gōrando de run run batoru!?" (Japanese: ハジケ合体パッチボボ!おふざけ無しのガチンコバトル!? / 激闘!恋の三角関係!!メリーゴーランドでルンルンバトル!?)	28 May 2005	19 May 2007
The new fusion form, Patchbobo, beats Jeda and his minions with a stinky yo-yo, a sugarcane sword, and the frozen Jelly Jiggler before getting a cameo to defeat the enemies. Meanwhile, Torpedo Girl's troubles at the merry-go-round draw her, Softon and Hatenko to the attention of a tough former leader (and his two incompetent underlings), but her fickle nature, combined with key and Blabs-a-lot powers, make quick work of them.
60	"Blowing Your Savings on Bubbles, Is It Worth It?" / "The Destined Three Alternatives! A Good Present, a Bad Heaven, a Normal Hell!? / Rice, the Noble Youth of Rice, Visits! Great Free-For-All of Enemies and Allies!!"; Transliteration: "Unmei no mitaku! Yoi gense, warui tengoku, futsū no jigoku!? / Amerika no kikōshi raisu sanjō! Teki mo mikata mo dai konsen!!" (Japanese: 運命の三択! 良い現世、悪い天国、普通の地獄!? / 米の貴公子ライス参上! 敵も味方も大混戦!!)	4 June 2005	26 May 2007
Bo-bobo's squad are dragged into a giant coin machine arena by the bubble-blowing Bubbleuba, who forces them into a six-on-six battle. With Beauty sent away, Jelly being tormented by a weird beast, and Dengaku Man defeated by bubble minions, Bo-bobo is forced to summon two more allies to assist him inside the new battleground before even more enemies emerge. Rice answers the call and assists in an all-out triple Wiggin takedown of the bubble blower.
61	"United We Stand, Divided We Also Stand, Just Further Apart!" / "Full-Throttle Ultra Service!! See? Make the Most of The Beautiful Figure!? / Mythical Beasts vs. Don Patch!! Even Dataless, Brace Yourself Goemon!!"; Transliteration: "Urutora sābisu zenkai!! Mite? Muda ni utsukushī Kono sugata!? / Genjū vs shuryō Patchi!! Dēta nashi demo funbare Goemon!!" (Japanese: ウルトラサービス全開!!見て?ムダに美しいコノ姿!? / 幻獣vs首領パッチ!!データ無しでも踏んばれゴエモン!!)	11 June 2005	9 June 2007
Still in the coin machine, Bo-bobo is forced to listen to Beauty facing the complaints of the narcoleptic Rem while Serviceman's attempts to show himself off are ignored by her. Desperate, he throws down Don Patch to save her, only to face a samurai whose monsters are cuter and more ignorant of his orders than he realizes. He finds a way to get back to Beauty, but Bo-bobo inadvertently leaves Rice at the mercy of Lambada and his polygons.
62	"Good Night! Sleep Tight! And Don't Let the Bedbugs Bug Ya!" / "Here's the Country of Death, the Country of Dreams! Sleep~, Sleep~, Re-m Rem♪ / Deciding Battle! Rem Sleep World!! Everyone Get Together and Don't Oversleep!!"; Transliteration: "Koko wa shi no kuni yume no kuni! Nemure, nemure, Rēmu Remu ♪ / Kessen! Remu surī puwārudo!! Min'na sorotte nen'ne shi natsu!!" (Japanese: ここは死の国夢の国!ねむ〜れ、ねむ〜れ、レームレム♪ / 決戦!レム·スリープワールド!!みんな揃ってねんねしなっ!!)	18 June 2005	16 June 2007
Using the power of her Fist style, Rem puts all of her captives (including Jelly, just arriving) to sleep, where they are forced into a dream world where she's the most powerful and anyone gets penalized for slumbering. With the combination of Bo-bobo and Jelly's Wiggin attacks, they last long enough for the power of Bo-bobo's anger (and a well-placed alarm clock) to wake them out of their doze. Don Patch is back after confusing Roman Samurai to the point of defeat.
63	"Our Dream Team Turns Bad Dreams to Bad Guys' Screams!" / "Now, Rem's Past is Exposed! A Story of Tearful Emotion(^^;) / Strong Enemy Lambada vs. Power of the Black Sun! A Slight Counterattack Sent Back Four Times(^0^)"; Transliteration: "Ima, abaka eru Remu no kako! Namida no kandō sutōrī (^^;) / Kyōteki Ranbada vs kuro taiyō no chikara! 4-Bai-gaeshi de chotto hangeki (^ 0 ^)" (Japanese: 今、あばかれるレムの過去!涙の感動ストーリー(^^;) / 強敵ランバダvs黒太陽の力!4倍返しでちょっと反撃(^0^))	25 June 2005	23 June 2007
Hoping to open up Rem's heart, Bo-bobo releases his own nightmarish Bo-bobo World, filled with dramatic and touching scenes that free the darkness within her for him to smash up. Before things become over-emotional, Lambada crashes in and releases the power of his polygon aura to change the shape of his opponents. Softon (with J's inherited Black Sun abilities) helps against the warrior of shapes, as he finds himself temporarily stopped by the judgement of Blabs-a-lot.
64	"Geometry 101: Painful, Perplexing and Pungent Polygons" / "Go on with the Polygons!! Both Dancing and Beautifully Formed High Spi~rits!? / Counterattack Retro Game(^0^)V Great Difference in Seeing and Doing!?"; Transliteration: "Porigon de ikeike!! Buyō mo biyō mo nori nori!? / Hangeki retoro gēmu (^ 0 ^) V miru to yaru to wa dai chigai!?" (Japanese: ポリゴンでイケイケ!! 舞踊も美容も の〜りのり!? / 反撃レトロゲーム(^0^)V 見るとやるとは大違い!?)	2 July 2005	30 June 2007
Still at the mercy of Lambada's polygons, the Wiggin Trio are changed again and again by the power of their enemy's aura. After temporarily taking him down with a paper-mache machine, Bo-bobo releases his ultimate defense against Lambada: an old style video game world where polygons become pixelated, with retro-style action, puzzles, racing and dating sims until finally being slashed down by a pixelated Bobopatchiggler.
65	"The Unreal Meal That's a Major Ordeal For Real" / "Fierce Oden Deathmatch! Bo-bobo vs. Hanpen!! / Shock! Power of Hanpen Fist!! The Dawn of Hanpen is Near?!"; Transliteration: "Nettō oden desu matchi! Bōbobo tai hanpen!! / Shōgeki! Hanpen uketamawa no chikara!! Hanpen no yoake wa chikai?!" (Japanese: 熱闘おでんデスマッチ! ボーボボ対ハンペン!! / 衝撃!ハンペン承の力!! ハンペンの夜明けは近い?!)	9 July 2005	14 July 2007
Bo-bobo's team confront their final obstacle before the Third's reawakening: General Lee Fishcake, the powerful former A-Block leader who throws the heroes into a soupy battleground. Forced to fight on top of fishcakes and bouillabaisse, Bo-bobo, Don Patch and Hatenko fight against the fishcake, a priest, and a sneezing churro while splashing around, feeding their opponent eggs, being smashed by giant squares, listening to the whining of Jelly Jiggler's food fight challenge, and uncovering the mystery of "fishamel".
66	"The Fishcake Frenzy: Freeze Dried, French Fried, Freaked Out Fracas" / "The Side Dish is Bright(^0^): Thanks for the Cheap Bento〜♪ / My Name is TenBobo! I Hate Fighting(^o^)"; Transliteration: "Okazu wa batchiri (^ 0 ^) otegaru bentō maido ari ~♪ / Boku no na wa ten bobo! Arasoi wa kiraidesu (^ o ^)" (Japanese: おかずはバッチリ(^0^) お手軽弁当まいどあり〜♪ / 僕の名は天ボボ! 争いは嫌いです(^o^))	16 July 2005	21 July 2007
As the bouillabaisse showdown continues, Bo-bobo's team try to damage General Lee Fishcake, attempting to break through his fishcake shields, lock him with self-made keys, and turn him into a (literal) shooting star. As he finally powers up to his limit, Jelly turns it into a personal battle, which falls apart instantly. His sacrifice and Bo-bobo's concern brings them together to a new fusion: the violently-peaceful Mr. Bojiggler.
67	"The Pacifist That Packs a Punch Like a Pugilist" / "Incredibly Stro~ng! Meet the Callously Heartless Hero☆!! / Devil's Door Opens...! The Dark Emperor Finally Activates!!"; Transliteration: "Keta hazure ni tsuyo~i! Hijō mujō no hīrō ☆ kenzan!! / Aka reshi akuma no tobira! Yami no kōtei tsuini shidō!!" (Japanese: ケタ外れに強ぉ〜い! 非情無情のヒーロー☆見参!! / 開かれし悪魔の扉...! 闇の皇帝ついに始動!!)	30 July 2005	28 July 2007
With the power of peace on his side (as well as the power of guns, angry birds, swords, and well-placed nosehairs), Mr. Bojiggler finally stops General Lee Fishcake. As one battle ends, the revival of former leader Czar Baldy-Bald the Third finally comes into fruition. Despite attempts to stop him in his box, a magical box escape reveals the resurrected emperor and his terrible power, while all Bo-bobo can do is offer watermelon.
68	"The Battle of Baldy Bald: Buckle Up and Brace Yourself" / "Announcement! Popularity Contest!! Who's in First? Me? / OVER vs. the 3rd vs. Bo-bobo! Three-Way Decisive Playoff of the Evil Secrets!!"; Transliteration: "Happyō! Ninki tōhyō! ! 1-I wa dare? Ore? / OVERvs 3-sei vs Bōbobo! Saikyō ōgi no mitsudomoe kessen!!" (Japanese: 発表!人気投票!! 1位は誰?オレ? / OVER vs. 3世 vs. ボーボボ! 最凶奥義の三つ巴決戦!!)	6 August 2005	4 August 2007
Using the power of a magical-fueled Fist, Baldy-Bald the Third takes his awakened power out on everyone, particularly the survivor of the Hair Kingdom in possession of the powerful, yet elusive Hair Ball. After surviving a rank-driven dart attack and watching allies disappear, Torpedo Girl suddenly turns back to OVER. Now with two warring enemies going after each other and Bo-bobo (as well Jelly Jiggler), the nosehair fighter truces with the silver-hair against a common foe.
69	"Yummy, Yummy, Yummy! Bo-bobo's in My Tummy!" / "Menace! Red and Blue Shinken!! Vs. Afro Golden Troop!! / The Great Transformation from Drinking Bo-bobo! He Looks Like a Showboy But Is Super Stro~ng!!"; Transliteration: "Kyōi! Shinku to ao ai ma ken!! Tai afuro ōgonkyō!! / Bōbobo nonde dai henshin! Mitame wa shoboi ga chō tsuyo~i!!" (Japanese: 脅威!真紅と青藍真拳!! 対アフロ黄金郷!! / ボーボボ飲んで大変身! 見た目はショボイが超強ォ〜い!!)	20 August 2005	11 August 2007
With the power of a massive handkerchief, Baldy-Bald the Third teleports Bo-bobo's team to a special universe where he starts removing the brains of the allies with his alternate "Fist of Blue Magic", but the brainless Bo-bobo is able to release an army from his afro and get everyone out. Desperate, Baldy-Bald decides to go after the Hair Ball the easy way: by eating Bo-bobo (and Don Patch). While more powerful, the former leader now has a bizarre appearance and the worst case of indigestion of his life from the Wiggin Duo.
70	"Baldy Bald Bottoms Out! Best of Luck, Be Well and Bye-Bye!" / "Finally Concluded! Tsuru Tsurulina the 3rd!! Defeated / Curtain Raising! New Emperor Playoffs!! Bo-bobo Troop's Raid!!"; Transliteration: "Tsuini ketchaku!! Tsuru tsururīna san-sei gekiha!! / Kaimaku! Shin kōtei kettei-sen!! Bōbobo ikkō naguri komi!!" (Japanese: ついに決着!! ツル·ツルリーナ三世撃破!! / 開幕!新皇帝決定戦!! ボーボボ一行殴りこみ!!)	27 August 2005	25 August. 2007
Attempting to pacify Baldy-Bald the Third's hatred of humans, Bo-bobo forces him to live through an abridged human life cycle, from kung-fu babies to space school and blowing up the office, all leading up to stopping the former emperor with the power of humanity. As their team flies off, an attack by a strange parachute-manipulating Hair Hunter leads to them learning of the Chrome Dome Playoff, where old rivals (as well as mysterious new ones) gather to fight to become the new emperor.
71	"Funneled into a Tunnel and Bamboozled By Noodles" / "Beauty's Close Call! Though I'm Alone, I Will Fight!! / Delicious? Then Lose! In Search of the World's Greatest Ramen!!"; Transliteration: "Byuti kiki ippatsu!! Watashi hitori demo tatakaimasu!! / Umai ♥ ga make yo! Mezase sekai saikō rāmen!!" (Japanese: ビュティ危機一髪!! 私一人デモ闘います!! / ウマイ?が負けよ! めざせ世界最高ラーメン!!)	17 September 2005	1 September 2007
Arriving at the entrance to the Bald Bowl, Bo-bobo and his allies get separated into different entrance trials. Beauty stands against a chain-wielding guard while Don Patch and Not Nice Cream ignore her and try to prove themselves as the main heroine. Bo-bobo and Gasser team up with the Three Civilizations against a ramen-creating temptress forcing them to create the most delicious meal. Escaping from these trials guarantees even more Hair Hunters in the next round.
72	"Si Señor, It's No Bore! It's Hair Hunters Galore!" / "Start! Badge Contest!! The Gold Batch is Proof of the Strong Ones! / Swiftly Run! Bo-bobo TV Channel! It's Here~The Meanacing Ratings!!"; Transliteration: "Kaishi! Batchi sōdatsu-sen!! Kin no batchi ga tsuwamono no akashi! / Tsuppashire! Bobobo TV-kyoku! Deta~kyōi no shichō-ritsu!!" (Japanese: 開始!バッチ争奪戦!! 金のバッチが強者の証! / 突っ走れ!ボボボTV局! 出た〜脅威の視聴率!!)	24 September 2005	15 September 2007
With Bo-bobo's team reunited and facing Baldy-Bald the Fourth (and an army of Hair Hunters), Bo-bobo chooses to enter the New Czar Playoff the easy way: by defeating the duct-tape-using leader of the Chrome Dome assassin corp and taking his medal. Although he and the other Wiggins nearly get stopped and almost get stuck as metamorphing goo, Bo-bobo finds a way to join the tournament: a non-stop TV channel with his own bizarre programming and horrible ratings.
73	"Take a Stance Against the Dance, Mr. Smarty Pants!" / "Badge Contest Battle Royal!! Desired Character Dream Match!? / Samba DE Bo-bobo! Demon to Yamamba to Sambaman!?"; Transliteration: "Batchi sōdatsu batoru roiyaru!! Natsukashi kyara to no dorīmu matchi!? / Sanba DE Bōbobo!! Yasha ni ya manba ni Sanbaman!?" (Japanese: バッチ争奪バトルロイヤル!! 懐かしキャラとのドリームマッチ!? / サンバDEボーボボ!! 夜叉にやまんばにサンバマン!?)	1 October 2005	22 September 2007
Now officially in the tournament, Bo-bobo's team heads inside the first battleground on a mountain of arenas: a bottle stage where their opponent is an extremely powerful warrior who uses the abilities of skulls to fight and transform into "a powerful old lady". With Bo-bobo, Don Patch and Jelly smashing his skull abilities with the power of Mother Nature, he is forced to turn into his true form: a samba-loving goofball who attempts to force the Wiggins to follow the beat until they beat it out of him.
74	"The Bigger the Gasser --- The Smellier the Gas!" / "The Battle Stage is an Immense He-Kun! Invoke Baby Mode!! / Transform! Angry DoDoDoDoDoDon Patch!!"; Transliteration: "Batoru sutēji wa kyodai-ka hekkun! Akachan mōdo hatsudō!! / Henshin! Ikari no DoDoDoDoDoDon Patchi!!" (Japanese: バトルステージは巨大化へっくん!赤ちゃんモード発動!! / 変身! 怒りの怒怒怒怒怒怒んパッチ!!)	8 October 2005	29 September 2007
Without warning, a sword-manipulating member of the Shadow Big Four destroys Bo-bobo's next battle arena and decides to make his own by turning Gasser into a giant. Even with the strange manipulation of Gasser's body and its unpredictable baby mode, a sacrifice by unexpected ally General Lee Fishcake forces Don Patch to take this battle seriously by transforming into Professional Patch.
75	"Finally! The Final Fight of Finality! Except the Final One!" / "Rushing to the Final Decisive Battle! Enter the Life-Sacrificing Clock Board!! / Angry Super Bo-bobo! In the Counterattack Huge Nosehair Bears Enter!?"; Transliteration: "Saishū kessen ni totsunyū! Kyōfu no ikenie tokei-ban tōjō!! / Ikari no Sūpā Bōbobo! Hangeki no kyodai hanage ni kumasan tōjō!?" (Japanese: 最終決戦に突入!恐怖の生贄時計盤登場!! / 怒りのスーパーボーボボ! 反撃の巨大鼻毛にクマさん登場!?)	22 October 2005	6 October 2007
With enough medals to enter Chrome Dome Castle, team Bo-bobo rushes ahead to finish the empire. Unexpectedly, three more of the Shadow Big Four pop up, forcing Bo-bobo to take on three super-powerful bags who can destroy the world. Don Patch lets the other two go in to destroy the rest of the competition and Lee Fishcake dresses up as Rem. Just when Bo-bobo seems too weak to take on the force of the Shadow Chrome Dome, his "super" power (and some gun-toting bears in a nosehair) forces them to prepare for their final stand.
76	"Finally! The Final Fight of Finality! This Time We Mean It!" / "Calling Super Denbo!! Countdown to Love and Peace?! / The Final Showdown at Last!! Fist of Nosehair FOREVER!!"; Transliteration: "Sūpā denbo sanjō!! Ai to heiwa no kauntodaun?! / Tsuini saishū kessen!! Hanage ma ken FOREVER!!" (Japanese: スーパー田ボ参上!! 愛と平和のカウントダウン?! / ついに最終決戦!! 鼻毛真拳FOREVER!!)	29 October 2005	13 October 2007
As Triple Bag upgrades his Shadow power, Bo-bobo and Dengaku Man fuse into an upgraded Denbo, who forces the enemy to go through a picture activity book before punishing him. Even with his defeat, the summon clock is still completed, allowing for Hydrate and his floating castle to emerge and allowing him to take over the empire! Now with the Shadow Chrome Dome forces in control, Bo-bobo and his allies ally with friends and enemies as they race upwards towards their enemy and their ultimate destiny, only to realize that this is the last episode, leaving Bo-bobo, Hydrate and the others shocked and horrified.

== Home media release ==
=== English ===
The series was originally licensed for home video release in North America by Illumitoon Entertainment in 2006, who released only two volumes on bilingual DVD in 2007. All further volumes were canceled when their distribution deal with Westlake Entertainment fell through. S'more Entertainment announced on January 16, 2012, that they would release the series with English subtitles as well as dubbed versions on DVD on April 10 of the same year. This release however, lacked an English subtitle track. Despite a fully translated script being present on a PDF file on disc 4 and indications on the box and in the pre-release information that there would be a subtitle track. S'more Entertainment released a statement claiming the packaging was wrong, and that there was never an intention to subtitle the release due to costs. In August 2018, Discotek Media announced their licensing of the series and released an SD Blu-ray disc set of all 76 episodes on January 28, 2020.
