= Tomi Pulkkinen =

Figure skater

Personal information
- Born: 2 August 1992 (age 34) Helsinki, Finland
- Home town: Dietlikon, Switzerland
- Height: 1.79 m (5 ft 10 1/2 in)

Figure skating career
- Country: Finland
- Coach: Richard Leroy, Sirkka Kaipio
- Skating club: EC Küsnacht
- Began skating: 1997

Medal record
Representing Switzerland
Swiss Championships
Silver medal – second place	2009 La Chaux-de-Fonds	Singles

Tomi Pulkkinen (born 2 August 1992) is a figure skater who represented Switzerland until 2012 and began competing for Finland in 2013. Born in Helsinki, Finland, he moved to Switzerland when he was eight years old and became a dual citizen. After winning the silver medal at the 2009 Swiss Championships, he was sent to the 2009 European Championships, where he placed 33rd. He also competed at two World Junior Championships for Switzerland. In 2013, Pulkkinen began representing Finland and joined the Finnish club Järvenpään Taitoluistelijat (JTL).

== Programs ==
Season	Short program	Free skating
2015–16	Faust Fantaisie by Henryk Wieniawski	Schindler's List by John Williams
2011–12	The Bull by Mike Theodore	Adiós Nonino by Astor Piazzolla
2010–11	Arsène Lupin by Debbie Wiseman	Angels & Demons; The Da Vinci Code by Hans Zimmer; Cyrano de Bergerac by Jean-Claude Petit
2009–10	Bleach by Shirō Sagisu	Angels & Demons; The Da Vinci Code by Hans Zimmer
2008–09	Black Hawk Down by Hans Zimmer	Violin Fantasy on Puccini's Turandot performed by Vanessa-Mae

== Competitive highlights ==
CS: Challenger Series; JGP: Junior Grand Prix

International
Event	08–09 (SUI)	09–10 (SUI)	10–11 (SUI)	11–12 (SUI)	13–14 (FIN)	14–15 (FIN)	15–16 (FIN)	16–17 (FIN)
Europeans	33rd							
CS Golden Spin						11th	11th	
CS Nebelhorn								WD
CS Nepela Trophy								WD
CS Warsaw Cup						10th		
Bavarian Open							12th	
Crystal Skate							1st	
Cup of Nice					16th			
Cup of Tyrol							4th	
Golden Bear							7th	
Ice Challenge		22nd						
Merano Cup		18th			10th			
Nepela Trophy					10th			
Nordics							6th	
Skate Helena							1st	
Printemps				9th				
International: Junior
Junior Worlds	36th		25th					
JGP Austria				15th				
JGP Czech Rep.	10th							
JGP Germany		18th	14th					
JGP Italy	17th							
JGP Japan			15th					
JGP Romania				12th				
National
Finnish Champ.						2nd	4th	
Swiss Champ.	2nd	10th	5th	5th				
Pulkkinen did not compete in the 2012–13 season.
