= Urban Romantic =

Studio album by Rie fu
- Released: April 8, 2009
- Genre: J-Pop
- Label: Sony Japan

Rie fu chronology
Tobira Album (2007)	Urban Romantic (2009)

Urban Romantic (typeset as URBAN ROMANTIC) is J-Pop singer Rie fu's fourth album, released April 8, 2009. It spent three weeks on the Oricon album chart, peaking at number 30 on April 20, 2009.

== Track listing ==
1. Something In My Head
2. Sunny Days
3. Hey I'm Calling Up
4. ビジネス (Bijinesu, Business)
5. あなたを想えばあふれる涙 (Anata wo Omoeba Afureru Namida)
6. Romantic
7. Drummy.
8. She Can't Say No (ノーと言えない女) (No to Ienai Onna)
9. Money Will Love You (English version)
10. いつかこの道の先に (All The Way) (Itsuka Kono Michi no Saki ni)
11. Present
12. Suki
13. Romantic (strings version)
