= Tobira Album =

Studio album by Rie fu (舩越 里恵 Rie Funakoshi)
- Released: November 21, 2007
- Genre: J-pop
- Label: Sony Japan

Rie fu (舩越 里恵 Rie Funakoshi) chronology
Rose Album (2006)	Tobira Album (2007)	Urban Romantic (2009)

Tobira Album is J-pop singer Rie fu's third album, released in 2007. It reached No. 34 on the Oricon Albums Chart.

== Track listing ==
1. "5000 マイル～Album version" (5000 Miles)
2. "Come To My Door"
3. "ツキアカリ" (Moonlight)
4. "君が浮かぶよ" (You Come to Mind)
5. "tobira"
6. "On Its Way"
7. "Until I Say"
8. "SMILE"
9. "Feel The Same"
10. "dreams be"
11. "Sunshine of my day～Live version"
12. "London"
13. "あなたがここにいる理由" (The Reason You're Here)
