= Freenote =

Japanese rock band

Freenote is a Japanese Rock band that consisted of three (formerly four, with the member Shusako Sato leaving) members: Chikako Hata (Vocals, Piano/Keyboard, Guitar), Masaya Sakamoto (Guitar), and Shingo Ōta(Drums). Formed in Kansai University in 2002, the group's first mini album was published on an indy label on December 3, 2003.

The band first gained nationwide exposure when their first single, Kirai Tune (キライチューン), was used as the ending theme for the popular Japanese anime series Bobobo-bo Bo-bobo. Subsequently, they received worldwide exposure (albeit to a much lesser extent) when the series became syndicated for worldwide distribution.

Since then, the group has released a number of singles and two full-length albums, but currently remain critically acclaimed, yet without commercial success on the Japanese pop charts.

In August 25, 2013, freenote disbanded with a live performance at Shimokitazawa CLUB Que. The lead vocalist Chikako Hata became a vocal coach, and you can find her website here.

The main bassist, Shusako, left the group on September 30, 2015 and joined KELUN, a band who created one of Bleach's openings.

== Discography ==
=== Singles ===
- Debut Single - キライチューン (Kirai Tune) - May 26, 2004
1. キライチューン
2. ボクラリズム
3. スロウ
- 2nd Single - Re:チャンネル (Re: Channel) - November 10, 2004
1. Re:チャンネル
2. 遥かへのスピードランナー
3. エアロプレイン
- 3rd Single - ウォークメン (Walkmen) - March 2, 2005
1. ウォークメン
2. Our Song
3. TELEPATHY
- 4th Single - さよならの歌 (Sayonara no Uta) - August 24, 2005
1. さよならの歌
2. Monday Morning
3. Sing A Song
- 5th Single - ピアノを弾いて (Piano wo Hiite) - November 9, 2005
1. ピアノを弾いて
2. SMDY
3. ピアノを弾いて (Acoustic version)

=== Mini albums ===
- Mini Album － 風花 - October 7, 2002
1. 風花
2. PASSING POINT
3. BRAND NEW DETERMINATION
4. HEATSTROKE
5. 鼓動
- 1st Mini Album - 終電マスター (Shūden Master) - December 3, 2003
1. 終電マスター
2. ひまわり
3. image
4. YOU
5. ハッピーバースデイ

=== Albums ===
- Introducing the Popline According to FREENOTE - April 20, 2005
1. Intro
2. ウォークメン
3. キライチューン
4. Dance Love
5. 遥かへのスピードランナー
6. トビラ
7. 終電マスター
8. Interlude
9. My Little War
10. Re:チャンネル
11. ボクラリズム
12. Happy Birthday
13. さよならの歌
14. Outro
- オトノハトライアングル (Otonoha Triangle) - July 25, 2007
1. DROP
2. HOME
3. サンキューフォーザミュージック
4. ターミナル
5. ウサギノメ
6. 歩いていこう
7. かなた
8. Life Is Beautiful
9. ゆびきり
10. アオイクマ
11. 雨模様
12. サクラノート
- ルート 3 (Route 3) - September 24, 2008
1. サマータイムブルー
2. ハローグッバイ
3. ラストワルツ
4. バッテリー
5. ディーン
6. あいのかたち
7. 東京ラブストーリー
8. 手紙
9. ペチカ
10. ルーティンワーク
11. Drawing
12. そらいろ
