= Yoshio Sawai =

Japanese manga artist

- Born: March 14, 1977 (age 49); Toyohashi, Aichi, Japan
- Occupation: Manga artist
- Known for: Bobobo-bo Bo-bobo

Yoshio Sawai (澤井啓夫, Sawai Yoshio; born March 14, 1977 in Toyohashi, Aichi Prefecture) is a Japanese manga artist, best known for his series Bobobo-bo Bo-bobo and sequel Shinsetsu Bobobo-bo Bo-bobo, both serialized in Weekly Shōnen Jump. Bobobo-bo Bo-bobo was adapted into a 76 episodes anime series by the Toei Animation studio between 2003 and 2005. His father is Japanese literature academic Taizo Sawai.

== Career ==
Sawai made his debut in Weekly Shōnen Jump drawing one shot manga such as Mutekiman and Fierce!! Rock Paper Scissors Island!!, all of which have a gag aspect of manga, usually using satire and visual gags. Not too long after beginning to work for Shōnen Jump, Sawai began experimenting with various concepts regarding characters who fought with bizarre bodily functions, including a hero who fought with farts and a poop-headed hero. His most successful experiment was a Fist of the North Star parody involving a strange afro-haired man who fought against "Hair Hunters" using his nose hairs in a post-apocalyptic society. The character, as well as the story itself, was Bobobo-bo Bo-bobo. Over several one-shots, Sawai further defined Bo-bobo as well as introducing other characters, including damsel-in-distress Beauty, fellow nosehair fighter Gunkan (Captain Battleship), rival fart-fighter Heppokomaru (Gasser), and a strange star-shaped creature and fellow "Hajikelist" known as Don Patch. After the success of these one-shots, Bo-bobo became a weekly series in 2001, where it had a long and successful run until its conclusion in 2007. Afterwards Sawai responded to every fanletter received during the series' 6-year run. He spent time with a fan diagnosed with adrenoleukodystrophy, eating together and gifting an autograph.

Sawai's art style is a mix of very blocky-looking characters and, sometimes, very detailed art. He tends to focus on the realistic appearance of his characters' facial expressions when they freak out. Because of the nature of his series, he has often written Bo-bobo version parodies of other authors' manga, including Akira Toriyama's Dragon Ball, Yudetamago's Kinnikuman, Kazuki Takahashi's Yu-Gi-Oh!, and Tsugumi Ohba's and Takeshi Obata's Death Note. He was also the leader of a team of gag-based manga artists (alongside Kyosuke Usuta, Amon Dai and Kouji Ooishi) who wrote a special 30th anniversary chapter of Osamu Akimoto's Kochira Katsushika-ku Kameari Kōen-mae Hashutsujo. (Kochi Kame) By his own admission Sawai's drawing skill is behind other contemporary authors, commenting "Even if my art is messy, even if the story doesn't makes sense, as long as I make people laugh then all is well."

Sawai returned to the magazine in September 2008 with new series Chagecha. He has also published a children's storybook, Kirarinchoshirizu.

In December 2011 Sawai started a spin-off manga of Don Patch from Bobobo-bo Bo-bobo entitled Fuwari! Don Pacchi in Saikyō Jump. A sequel to the spinoff titled "Honnori! Don Patch" was serialized in the Shōnen Jump+ app until its conclusion in August 2015.

A new one-shot titled "Frontline Spirits" was released February 2021 on the Shōnen Jump+ app

== Bibliography ==
- Mutekiman (ムテキマン) (Shueisha)
- Fierce!! Rock, Paper, Scissors Island (激戦!!ジャンケン島; Gekisen!! Janken Shima) (Shueisha)
- Little Devil Koron (小悪魔コロン; Shōakuma Koron)
- Bobobo-bo Bo-bobo (ボボボーボ・ボーボボ) (2001–2005, Shueisha)
- Shinsetsu Bobobo-bo Bo-bobo (真説ボボボーボ・ボーボボ) (2006–2007, Shueisha)
- Black Owl (黒梟; Kuro Fukurō)
- Chagecha (チャゲチャ) (2008, Shueisha)
- Kirarincho's Ghost Festa (キラリンチョのおばけフェスタ; Kirarincho no Obake Festa) (2009, Shueisha)
- Fuwari! Don Pacchi (ふわり!どんぱっち) (2012-2014, Shueisha)
- Honnori! Don Patch (ほんのり!どんぱっち) (2014-2015, Shueisha)
- Minchi Shokudou (ミンチ食堂) (2018, Shueisha)
- Frontline Spirits (フロントライン・スピリッツ) (2021, Shueisha)
