= Bobobo-bo Bo-bobo =

Japanese manga and anime series

- Eleventh tankōbon volume cover

ボボボーボ・ボーボボ (Bobobōbo Bōbobo)
- Genre: Adventure; Parody; Surreal comedy
- Manga
- Written by: Yoshio Sawai
- Published by: Shueisha
- English publisher: NA: Viz Media
- Imprint: Jump Comics
- Magazine: Weekly Shōnen Jump
- English magazine: NA: Shonen Jump
- Original run: February 20, 2001 – November 14, 2005
- Volumes: 21
- Anime television series
- Directed by: Hiroki Shibata
- Written by: Yoshio Urasawa
- Music by: Kōichirō Kameyama
- Studio: Toei Animation
- Licensed by: NA: Discotek Media
- Original network: ANN (TV Asahi) (#1–51); TV Asahi, HTB, Nagoya TV, ncc, ABC, KBC, KAB (#52–76)
- English network: AUS: Cartoon Network; UK: Jetix; US: Cartoon Network (Toonami)
- Original run: November 8, 2003 – October 29, 2005
- Episodes: 76
- Manga

Shinsetsu Bobobo-bo Bo-bobo
- Written by: Yoshio Sawai
- Published by: Shueisha
- Imprint: Jump Comics
- Magazine: Weekly Shōnen Jump
- Original run: December 19, 2005 – July 2, 2007
- Volumes: 7
- icon

Bobobo-bo Bo-bobo (Japanese: ボボボーボ・ボーボボ, Hepburn: Bobobōbo Bōbobo) is a Japanese manga series written and illustrated by Yoshio Sawai. It was serialized in Shueisha's shōnen manga magazine Weekly Shōnen Jump from February 2001 to November 2005, with its chapters collected in 21 tankōbon volumes. It was followed by a sequel titled Shinsetsu Bobobo-bo Bo-bobo, serialized from December 2005 to July 2007, with its chapters collected in seven tankōbon volumes. In North America, Viz Media published some volumes of the manga.

A 76-episode anime television series adaptation by Toei Animation was broadcast on TV Asahi from November 2003 to October 2005. The anime series aired in the United States on Cartoon Network from 2005 to 2007.

A spin-off, Fuwari! Don Patch, was serialized from December 2011 to June 2014, with its chapters collected in three tankōbon volumes, with a second part, Honnori! Don Patch, being serialized from October 2014 to August 2015 and collected as a single tankōbon volume.

By January 2021, the Bobobo-bo Bo-bobo manga had over 7 million copies in circulation.

== Plot ==
In the year 300X, the entire world is under the tyrannical rule of a regime called the Maruhage Empire (Chrome Dome Empire in the English translation of both the manga and anime). Its ruler, Emperor Tsuru Tsurulina IV (Czar Baldy Bald IV), has initiated the Hair Hunt, a crusade where his army, the Hair Hunters, invade settlements, shave bald every person they see, and leave said settlements in ruins. Standing against the Hair Hunt is Bobobo-bo Bo-bobo, a bizarre, but powerful rebel who fights the Hair Hunters with the Hanage Shinken (Super Fist of the Nose Hair), a martial art that gives him the power to control his nose hairs like whips. Bo-bobo's group consists of Beauty, a teenage girl he rescued; Heppokomaru (Gasser), a teenage boy who fights with the Onara Shinken (Super Fist of the Back Wind), allowing him to weaponize his own flatulence; and Don Patch (Poppa Rocks), an eccentric creature who leads the Hajike Gang (Wiggin Gang), a group that fights by confusing their enemies into submission. Bo-bobo is on an exciting, gag-filled quest in which he ventures from locale to locale, fighting the forces of the Maruhage Empire and gaining more allies along the way.

== Media ==
=== Manga ===
Bobobo-bo Bo-bobo, written and illustrated by Yoshio Sawai, was serialized in Shueisha's shōnen manga magazine Weekly Shōnen Jump from February 20, 2001, to November 14, 2005. Shueisha collected its 230 individual chapters into 21 tankōbon volumes, released from July 4, 2001, to May 2, 2006.

A sequel manga titled Shinsetsu Bobobo-bo Bo-bobo (真説ボボボーボ・ボーボボ, Shinsetsu Bobobōbo Bōbobo; True Theory: Bobobo-bo Bo-bobo) was published in Weekly Shōnen Jump from December 19, 2005, to July 2, 2007. Shueisha compiled the sequel's 73 individual chapters into seven tankōbon volumes released from July 4, 2006, to January 1, 2008.

In North America, the manga has been licensed by Viz Media and was published in a one-shot graphic novel form on October 5, 2005, including content from the ninth and tenth volumes of the Japanese release. It was later published monthly in Shonen Jump from July 2007 to June 2009. At Anime Expo 2008, when asked about why certain volumes were never published, Viz Media said it was for content reasons. Viz Media restarted the manga release in 2008. The first volume (eleventh volume of the Japanese release) was published on August 5, 2008. A total of five volumes of Bobobo-bo Bo-bobo were published until October 5, 2010, before Viz Media ceased the series' publication.

A spin-off, titled Fuwari! Don Patch (ふわり!どんぱっち), started in Shueisha's Saikyō Jump on December 3, 2011. Shueisha released three tankōbon volumes from November 2, 2012, to June 4, 2014. A second part, titled Honnori! Don Patch (ほんのり!どんぱっち), was published on Shōnen Jump+ from October 3, 2014, to August 3, 2015. A single tankōbon volume was released on August 4, 2015.

=== Anime ===
The anime adaptation of Bobobo-bo Bo-bobo is directed by Hiroki Shibata, produced by Toei Animation and ran for 76 episodes from November 8, 2003, to October 29, 2005, on TV Asahi. The first opening theme for episodes 1 to 32 is "Wild Challenger" by Jindou, and the second opening theme for episode 33 onwards is "Baka Survivor" (バカサバイバー; Stupid Survivor) by Ulfuls. The first ending theme for episodes 1 to 19 is "Shiawase" (幸せ; Happiness) by Mani Laba, the second ending theme for episodes 20 to 32 is "Kirai Tune" (キライチューン; Hate Tune) by Freenote, and the third ending theme for episode 33 onwards is "H.P.S.J." by Mihimaru GT.

In North America, Toei Animation appointed the Joy Tashjian Marketing Group, to handle character licensing for the series. A sneak peek was shown on Cartoon Network's "Summer 2005 Kick-Off Special" in May 2005, and then premiered on the network's Toonami programming block on September 30 of that same year. New episodes premiered on February 17, 2007. The series was also made available on Cartoon Network's broadband service Toonami Jetstream starting on November 5, 2007. In the United Kingdom, the series premiered on Jetix on April 16, 2007.

The series was originally licensed for home video release in North America by Illumitoon Entertainment in 2006, who released only two volumes on bilingual DVD in 2007, before their distribution deal with Westlake Entertainment fell through, and all further volumes were canceled. S'more Entertainment released the series with English subtitles and dubbing on DVD on April 10, 2012. This release, however, lacked an English subtitle track, despite a fully translated script being present on a PDF file on the fourth disc, indication on the box, and pre-release information that there would be a subtitle track on the release. S'more Entertainment released a statement claiming the packaging was wrong, and there never was an intention to subtitle the release, due to costs. In August 2018, Discotek Media announced that it had licensed the series, which was released on a SD Blu-ray Disc set with all the 76 episodes on January 28, 2020.

=== Video games ===
There are seven Japan-exclusive video games based on Bobobo-bo Bo-bobo developed by Hudson Soft. Four video games were launched for the Game Boy Advance, two video games for the PlayStation 2, and one for the GameCube. Characters from the series have appeared along with characters from other Weekly Shōnen Jump's series in the crossover fighting games Jump Super Stars and Jump Ultimate Stars for the Nintendo DS, and J-Stars Victory VS for the PlayStation 3, PlayStation 4, and PlayStation Vita.

=== Stage play ===
A stage play adaptation was announced on April 1, 2024. It was initially announced as an April Fools' Day joke at midnight, but was later confirmed to be real. The stage play, titled Chō Hajike Stage Bobobo-bo Bo-bobo (超ハジケステージ☆ボボボーボ・ボーボボ), is directed and written by Keita Kawajiri and is set to run at Theatre1010 in Tokyo from October 23–31, 2024. Another stage play is set to run in Tokyo from June 12–21, 2026.

== Reception ==
By January 2021, the Bobobo-bo Bo-bobo manga had over 7 million copies in circulation.
