= RSP (band) =

Japanese musical duo

- Also known as: Real Street Project
- Origin: Kansai region, Japan
- Genres: Hip hop R&B dance J-pop
- Years active: 2006–2013
- Labels: Sony
- Past members: Ai; Saki
- Website: SONY Official Site

Real Street Project (アールエスピー, Āru Esu Pī) was a Japanese popular music group consisting of two female singers: Ai and Saki. They have released ten singles and two studio albums. They are officially described as a "Hip-hop/R&B Dance Unit."

== History ==
Originally from the Kansai region, the band was formed as the result of an audition contest called "Real Street Project," held by Sony Records. RSP was selected out of over 5000 competitors to win a record deal and become formally released.

They debuted with the single "A Street Story" in December 2006, which made the Kansai top ten list in sales. The band was featured in a television documentary, and later played a major part in producing a television program entitled "Street Dance Drama."

In August 2007, the band released their second single, "Lifetime Respect: 女編" (Onna Hen), which derives from the song "Lifetime Respect" by Miki Dōzan and includes samples from the earlier work. The band describes their version as an "answer-song." This second single debuted at #5 on the Oricon hit list and moved up to #4 shortly afterwards.

Their song, "Kansha" was used as the fourteenth ending theme for the anime Bleach, and was released as a single on 6 February 2008.

In June 2009, the band released their seventh single, "アンマー～母唄～" ("Anma~HaHa Uta~"), which is a cover of the song "アンマー" ("Anma") by Kariyushi58 (かりゆし58), an Okinawan rock-reggae band. The word "アンマー" ("Anma") means Mother in Okinawan.

The song "Dice" has also come out with a music video, even though it was not produced as a single, but it is on the studio album "Dice".

Real Street Project once again contributed a song for Bleach with their 9th single, "Tabidatsu kimi e" used as its twenty-second ending. The single was released on 10 March 2010.

On 14 June 2010, it was announced that Real Street Project would be attending and performing in the United States at Anime Expo, as official guests of honor. Real Street Project held their concert on 1 July 2010 at Nokia Plaza. The Bleach ending songs, "Tabidatsu Kimi e" and "Kansha", along with their latest single "Ai Kotoba", were some of the songs they performed. It was their first live concert outside Japan.

Real Street Project's tenth single, "Ai Kotoba" was released on 7 July 2010.

Real Street Project's second studio album, entitled "ii" was released on 29 September 2010. The album is also packaged with a DVD that contains several music videos and footage of Real Street Project's trip to Los Angeles for Anime Expo 2010.

On 3 November 2013, they made their final show at Shinsaibashi Club Drop (Osaka).

== Members ==
Vocalists

- Ai (Ai Matsuo) (b. 16 June 1985)
- Saki (Sakiko Yayama) (b. 18 December 1981)

== Discography ==
=== Singles ===
Single #	Single information	Track listing
1st	"A Street Story": Released: December 6, 2006; Studio Album: Dice; Oricon weekly peak: #55; Certification:	1. "A Street Story"; 2. "Kono Machi no Katasumi de" (この街の片隅で; "On the Corner of This Street"); 3. "platinum" 4. "A Street Story -instrumental-"
2nd	"Lifetime Respect (Onna Hen)" (Lifetime Respect -女編-; "Lifetime Respect (Woman Version)"): Released: August 8, 2007; Studio Album: Dice; Oricon weekly peak: #4; Certification: Gold (RIAJ)	1. "Lifetime Respect (Onna Hen)"; 2. "Natsu Onna" (夏オンナ; "Summer Woman"); 3. "Lifetime Respect (Onna Hen) (instrumental)"
2nd	"Lifetime Respect (Onna Hen) (Limited Edition)": Released: November 21, 2007; Studio Album: Dice; Oricon weekly peak: #4; Certification: Gold (RIAJ)	1. "Lifetime Respect (Onna Hen)"; 2. "Aishiteru" (愛してる; "I Love You"); 3. "Lifetime Respect (Onna Hen) (instrumental)"
3rd	"Kansha." (感謝。; Appreciation): Released: February 6, 2008; Studio Album: Dice; Oricon weekly peak: #25; Certification:	1. "Kansha."; 2. "Ai to Yūjō ~ Cypress Ueno Is Mine" (愛と友情～サイプレス上野 Is Mine, Ai to Yūjō ~ Saipuresu Ueno Is Mine; "Love and Friendship, Cypress Ueno Is Mine"); 3. "Homie"; 4. "Kansha. (Instrumental)"
4th	"M (Mō Hitotsu no Love Story)" (M～もうひとつのラブストーリー～, Emu ~Mō Hitotsu no Rabu Sutōrī~; "M (Another Love Story)"): Released: July 2, 2008; Studio Album: Dice; Oricon weekly peak: #8; Certification:	1. "M (Mō Hitotsu no Love Story)"; 2. "Serious Love"; 3. "M (Mō Hitotsu no Love Story) (Instrumental)"
5th	"La La La Love Song (Koko Kara Hajimaru Koimonogatari)" (LA・LA・LA LOVE SONG ～ここから始まる恋物語～; "La La La Love Song (The Love Story Starts Here)): Released: December 10, 2008; Studio Album: ii; Oricon weekly peak: Certification:	1. "La La La Love Song (Koko Kara Hajimaru Koimonogatari)"; 2. "Kataomoi Datte Iin ja Nai?" (片想いだっていいんじゃない?; "Is It Because of Unrequited Love?"); 3. "Memories"; 4. "La La La Love Song (Koko Kara Hajimaru Koimonogatari) (Instrumental)"
6th	"Sakura (Anata ni Deaete Yokatta)" (さくら ～あなたに出会えてよかった～"; "Cherry Blossom (Glad to Have Met You)"): Released: February 25, 2009; Studio Album: ii; Oricon weekly peak: Certification:	1. "Sakura (Anata ni Deaete Yokatta)"; 2. "Superstar"; 3. "Yozora ni (Sound of Lovers)" (夜空に ～Sound of Lovers～; "The Night Sky (Sound of Lovers)"); 4. "Sakura (Anata ni Deaete Yokatta) (Instrumental)"
7th	"Anmaa (Hahauta)" (アンマー ～母唄～; "Mother (Mother Song)"): Released: June 3, 2009; Studio Album: ii; Oricon weekly peak: Certification:	1. "Anmaa (Hahauta)"; 2. "You Are My Friend"; 3. "La La La Love Song" (LA・LA・LA LOVE SONG); 4. "Anmaa (Hahauta) (Instrumental)"
8th	"Ren'aika (Ano Hi ni Kaeritai)" (恋哀歌 ～あの日に帰りたい～; "Love Elegy (I Want to Go Today)"): Released: October 21, 2009; Studio Album: ii; Oricon weekly peak: Certification:	1. "Ren'aika (Ano Hi ni Kaeritai)"; 2. "Mikazuki" (三日月; "Crescent Moon"); 3. "Kisetsu no Kioku" (季節の記憶; "Memory of the Season"); 4. "Ren'aika (Ano Hi ni Kaeritai) (Instrumental)"
9th	"Tabidatsu Kimi e" (旅立つキミへ; "Leaving You"): Released: March 10, 2010; Studio Album: ii; Oricon weekly peak: Certification:	1. "Tabidatsu Kimi e" 2. "Akarui Hikari no Naka de" (明るい光の中で; "In the Bright Light"); 3. "Mudō" (夢道; "Dream Road"); 4. "Tabidatsu Kimi e (Instrumental)"
10th	"Aikotoba" (アイコトバ; "Password"): Released: July 7, 2010; Studio Album: ii; Oricon weekly peak: Certification:	1. "Aikotoba"; 2. "End of Loop"; 3. "You're Not Alone"; 4. "Aikotoba (Instrumental)"

=== Albums ===
Album #	Album information	Track listing
1st	DICE: Released: August 27, 2008; Oricon weekly peak: TBA; Certification:	1. "GO ON BABY!"; 2. "Lifetime Respect (Onna Hen)"; 3. "DICE"; 4. "A Street Story (Album Ver.)"; 5. "The First Star"; 6. "Hanbunko" (はんぶんこ; "Halfsies"); 7. "Shining Star"; 8. "Aishiteru (Album Ver.)"; 9. "kiss" 10. "Sorry"; 11. "Driving Limit"; 12. "M (Mō Hitotsu no Love Story)"; 13. "Kansha."; 14. "Kono Machi no Katasumi de (Album Ver.)"
2nd	ii: Released: September 29, 2010; Oricon weekly peak: TBA; Certification:	1. "Aikotoba"; 2. "Sunshine baby" 3. "Sakura (Anata ni Deaete Yokatta)"; 4. "Tokyo Message" (東京メッセージ, Tōkyō Messēji); 5. "Anmaa (Hahauta)"; 6. "Departure"; 7. "for all time" 8. "Ren'aika (Ano Hi ni Kaeritai)"; 9. "Mō Ichido Dake (I Love You)" (もう一度だけ～I love you～; "Only Once (I love you)"); 10. "Tabidatsu Kimi e" 11. "Omoide"; 12. "Mechakucha Anata ga Suki da Kara" (めちゃくちゃあなたが好きだから; "I Like Your Mess"); 13. "La La La Love Song (Koko Kara Hajimaru Koi Monogatari)"; 14. "AIMAI (Album Ver.)"
