= Rie fu (album) =

Studio album by Rie fu
- Released: January 19, 2005
- Genre: J-pop
- Label: Sony Japan

Rie fu chronology
Rie fu (2005)	Rose Album (2006)

Rie fu is J-pop singer Rie fu's self-titled debut album, released in 2005. A portion of her bilingual (English and Japanese) song Life is Like a Boat was used as the closing theme for the first 13 episodes of the anime series Bleach.

== Track listing ==
1. "笑って、恵みのもとへ" (Waratte, Megumi no Moto he; Laughing, To the Origin Of Grace)
2. "Beautiful Words"
3. "Somebody's World"
4. "2cm"
5. "I So Wanted"
6. "Decay"
7. "Prayers & Melodies"
8. "雨の日が好きって思ってみたい" (Ame no Hi ga Sukitte Omotte Mitai; I Want To Think I Like Rainy Days)
9. "Voice" (Album Version)
10. "ツキノウエ(Jamming Version)" (Tsuki no Ue; Over the Moon)
11. "Shine"
12. "Life is Like a Boat"
13. "~Interlude~"
14. "decay" (English Version)
