= Chu-Bura =

2008 EP by Kelun

EP by Kelun
- Released: July 2, 2008
- Genre: Rock
- Length: 44:09
- Label: SME-Records

Kelun chronology
Sixteen Girl (2008)	Chu-Bura (2008)	Kelun (2008)

Chu-Bura is the second EP by Japanese rock band Kelun. It was released on July 2, 2008 by Sony Music Entertainment. The single "Chu-Bura" served as the eighth opening theme song for the anime Bleach. It was also released with the Bleach Best Tunes CD and DVD compilation on December 17, 2008. "Boy's Don't Cry", the B-side, is the opening theme for the PlayStation Portable game, Bleach: Soul Carnival. A deluxe poster, featuring Jūshirō Ukitake, the 13th squad captain from Bleach, was given out as a promotional item with the first release. It was featured in the studio album of the same name.

== Track listing ==
No.	Title	Length
1.	"Chu-Bura"	4:34
2.	"Boy's Don't Cry"	3:48
3.	"Asayake Umbrella"	3:59
4.	"Chu-Bura (instrumental)"	4:34

== Chart positions ==
Chart (2008)	Peak position
Oricon	8
