= Rie fu =

Japanese singer-songwriter and musician (born 1985)

- Also known as: Rié
- Born: Rie Funakoshi (舩越 里恵); January 11, 1985 (age 41); Tokyo, Japan
- Genres: Japanese pop folk rock
- Occupations: Singer-songwriter, musician
- Instruments: Vocals, piano
- Years active: 2004–present
- Labels: Sony Japan; Palm Beach (2004–2008); Gr8! Records (2008–)
- Website: riefu.com

Rie Funakoshi (Japanese: 舩越 里恵, Hepburn: Funakoshi Rie; born January 11, 1985) better known by her stage name Rie fu (リエ フゥ, Rie Fū), is a Japanese singer-songwriter and musician. She resides in Tokyo but frequently travels to the United Kingdom, where she is known as Rié, to record and promote her work.

Rie fu's songs are often bilingual, since she is fluent in both English and Japanese. Although most of her songs are primarily sung in Japanese, many feature entire verses written in English (such as Life is Like a Boat). Of her songs written entirely in Japanese, several have later been released as English-language versions.

== Personal life ==
Rie fu was born in Tokyo. From 1992 to 1995, she lived in Maryland with her family, including a younger brother who plays a woodwind instrument. It was during this time that she started playing the piano and gained a lot of musical inspiration, from artists such as Sheryl Crow and 1970s pop musicians such as The Carpenters. She cites Carole King, Joni Mitchell, The Carpenters, and Yumi Matsutoya as influences.

After returning to Japan, Rie finished her primary and secondary education in Tokyo at Aoyama Gakuin from 1995 to 2003. In 2007, she graduated from the Central Saint Martins College of Art and Design of the University of the Arts London in fine art (having shifted in interest from fashion design and graphic design). Upon graduation, she returned to Tokyo, Japan, and has since resided there full-time. Rie often designs much of her own album and single booklets and features her own paintings in them as well.

She is active in both music and art. Her artwork is published under the Roman transliteration "Rie Funakoshi" and her music under "Rie fu," the abbreviation of her full name.

On November 29, 2013, she announced on her Facebook page that she had married a 'funky British gentleman' (the identity of the man in question has not been revealed), presumably sometime recently during the month. She has 2 sons.

== Music career ==
In 2002, while in high school, Rie fu learned guitar, and almost immediately began coming up with songs and recording them with a small tape recorder. She sent the demo tape off to a record company (Sony) and they signed her to their Palm Beach label.

Her first single, "Rie who!?", featuring the song "decay," was released in March 2004, while she was attending university in London. Later that year, her song "Life Is Like a Boat" was chosen as the first ending theme for the anime series Bleach, garnering her widespread recognition. In 2005 she released her first full-length album, self-titled, and her song "I Wanna Go To A Place..." was used as the Gundam SEED Destiny third ending theme and released as a single. She participated in a track on m-flo's Beat Space Nine album, and embarked on her first nationwide tour in September of that year.

In 2006 she released her second full-length album, Rose Album, and her song "Until I Say" was used as the theme song for the Japanese release of the 2005 British film Heidi. In 2007 her song "Tsukiakari" was featured as the ending theme to Darker than Black. In July upon graduation from university she returned to Japan to live full-time, and released her third full-length album Tobira Album.

In 2008, her song "Home," used as the theme to the Japanese film Koneko no Namida, was released as a single. In March, she released an album in the UK on a British label called Tired & Lonesome, titled "Who is Rie fu?", a compilation of earlier songs with a previously unreleased cover of Joni Mitchell's song "Both Sides, Now". A Japanese release with additional new tracks was planned, as was a continental European release. Neither materialized and the original UK album went out of print, having failed to establish an overseas presence for Rie fu. The following month she switched from Sony's Palm Beach label to its gr8! records label.

In 2009 she released her fourth full-length album, Urban Romantic. Having contributed vocals to all of the songs on Orange Range head Naoto's solo project delofamilia's second album, eddy, she went on tour with the band. She also joined Yōsui Inoue's commemorative 40th anniversary tour, contributing chorus vocals.

Her album, at Rie sessions, was released on March 31, 2010, and is her first self-produced album. Many of the tracks on the album feature duets with other notable singers, and were recorded at Rie fu's home. As of 2011 she is more heavily involved with delofamilia, with it being described as "A band based around Naoto Hiroyama and Rie fu" on the band's Facebook page.

Her song "Anata ga Koko ni Iru Riyuu" was in the anime D.Gray-man for their fifth closing song.

Her first compilation album, I Can Do Better, was released on November 23, 2011.

To celebrate the anniversary of ten years since her debut, Rie undertook a project to produce two consecutive albums titled 'I' and 'O' respectively. The project concept being that the first album 'I' stood for the word 'Inside' and was written from musical inspirations from her years of experiences 'inside' Japan and the Japanese music market. The second album titled 'O' stood for 'Outside' and was written and developed inspired by her developing Asian experiences. Placing the two albums side by side also created the image of the number 10 to mark the occasion and to acknowledge and thank her fans for ten successful years in the industry.

== Rié ==
In May 2016, Rie relocated to the UK launching a new artist name, Rié. Cognizant of differing musical styles in Japan and the UK, Rie chose to continue to release new music in Japan under the artist names of Rie Fu and Rié for the UK respectively. Her reasons for feeling the need to adapt the artist name to suit a different market is explained here.

Rié launched her first three track EP in June 2017, entitled 'Business Trips' it consisted of three new songs sung entirely in English, St Martin, Calling and Business Trips.

== Discography ==
=== Studio albums ===
Title	Release date
Rie fu	January 19, 2005
Rose Album	March 24, 2006
Tobira Album	November 21, 2007
Urban Romantic	April 8, 2009
at Rie Sessions	March 31, 2010
Bigger Picture	November 21, 2012
I	November 12, 2014
O	April 6, 2016
Portraits	September 6, 2017

=== Special Project album ===
Title	Release date
Fu Diary (released in six monthly installments)	June 15, 2012 (You Do); July 15, 2012 (Easy); August 15, 2012 (Fujirock); September 15, 2012 (Fun Play (たのしいあそび, Tanoshi Asobi)); October 15, 2012 (Jet Lag); November 15, 2012 (Winter Love Song)
Fu Diary 2 Around The World (released through Ototoy) https://ototoy.jp/_/default/p/50338	April 1 (Singapore) April 1, 2015 (Bali) April 1, 2015 (China) April 1, 2015 (New York) April 1, 2015 (Bangladesh) April 1, 2015 (Borneo) April 1, 2015 (Rome)

=== Cover albums ===
Title	Release date
Rie fu Sings The Carpenters	September 4, 2013

=== Best-of Albums ===
Title	Release date
I Can Do Better	November 23, 2011

=== Singles ===
Title	Release date
Rie who!?	March 24, 2004
Life Is Like a Boat	September 23, 2004
I Wanna Go to a Place...	April 27, 2005
Negaigoto (ねがいごと)	August 31, 2005
Tiny Tiny Melody	March 8, 2006
Until I Say	July 19, 2006
Tsukiakari (ツキアカリ)	May 23, 2007
5000 Miles	September 5, 2007
Anata ga Koko ni Iru Riyuu (あなたがここにいる理由)	October 24, 2007
Home	January 23, 2008
Romantic	November 12, 2008
Present	February 25, 2009
For You	February 16, 2011
Let It Curl	May 5, 2014

=== European and UK releases ===
Title	Release date
Who Is Rie fu?	March 3, 2008

Business Trips EP as Rié June 20, 2017 St Martin Calling Business Trips
