= Mihimaru GT =

Japanese musical group

- Also known as: MGT, Mihi, MihiGT, Maru
- Origin: Japan
- Genres: J-Urban, J-pop
- Years active: 2003–2013 (indefinite hiatus)
- Label: Universal Music Japan
- Members: Mitsuyuki Miyake; Akutsu Hiroko
- Website: universal-music.co.jp

Mihimaru GT were an urban and pop music group signed to Universal Music Japan and managed by Tearbridge Productions, a subsidiary of Stardust Promotion and Avex.

== History ==
Mihimaru GT was a Japanese duet made up of composer, lyricist and vocalist Miyake as well as lyricist and vocalist Hiroko. The group was formed due to the joint management of the two members during their solo careers. Before forming Mihimaru GT, each member had a relatively quiet career, with little to no major hits.

To remind each other that the success of the group comes from the hard work and contributions of both members, the name Mihimaru GT was created for the band, taking the first two letters in each members' first name and adding "maru", or "perfection", to the end of it, as well as the initials for Miyake's favorite video game—Gran Turismo.

Unlike many other groups, Mihimaru GT often recorded songs featuring only one of their members, though because of each members' background, they were both involved with every song in some way. Hiroko was usually responsible for the main melody of the song, whereas Miyake was featured in the rap that may appear in a song. The band is known for its urban and pop-oriented songs, as well as slow ballad oriented songs. They were signed to one of the largest independent music labels in the world.

Prior to 2006, they have had an average career, with their singles ranking no higher than #16 on the Oricon charts. In 2006, however, their single, "Kibun Jojo" became the commercial song for Dariya's "Palty" and music.jp's commercial theme, as well as the ending theme for the variety program "Sukibara". The triple tie-up gave them considerable media exposure, and more people began to take notice of them. On May 5, 2006, they performed on the popular music show Music Station and was featured on the "Young Guns" corner. The appearance on the show boosted their popularity and made "Kibun Jojo" onto the #7 spot on the Oricon charts.

From then on, their sales peaked and eventually bottomed out, though "Itsumademo Hibiku Kono Melody/Magical Speaker" managed to reach as high as #3 on the Oricon charts.

The song "H.P.S.J." was featured as the third ending song for the anime Bobobo-bo Bo-bobo; "Kibun Jojo" itself has been covered in rhythm action games such as Taiko: Drum Master, Moero! Nekketsu Rhythm Damashii Osu! Tatakae! Ouendan 2 and you can dance to the song in Happy Dance collection for Nintendo Wii.

On November 7, Mihimaru GT released a hip-hop re-arrangement/cover of Kylie Minogue's "I Should Be So Lucky" as a double A-side single (the other A-side being Ai Kotoba.) The song, "I Should Be So Lucky", was used as the ending theme for the Japanese drama Abarenbou Mama (Wild Mama) which stars Aya Ueto.

"Girigiri Hero" is featured in the movie Shaoulin Shojou.

"Switch" was used for the 2009 World Table Tennis Championship in Japan.

The duo's most recent single, Masterpiece was used as a main theme for the TV animation Yu-Gi-Oh! Zexal.

In April 2011, the duo performed with Korean singer Park Jung Min at an UN Charity Concert in Yokohama, Japan to aid victims of the 2011 Tōhoku earthquake and tsunami.

In 2013, the group went on indefinite hiatus, intending to focus on their individual activities.

== Discography ==
=== Singles ===
#	Information	Copies sold
1st / Debut Single	Yakusoku (約束, Promise): Released: July 30, 2003; Format: CD5"; Oricon Top 200 Weekly Peak: #156	1,972
2nd	Kaerōka (帰ろう歌): Released: April 28, 2004; Format: CD5"; Oricon Top 200 Weekly Peak: #32	38,597
3rd	Negai (願 ～Negai～): Released: July 28, 2004; Format: CD5"; Oricon Top 200 Weekly Peak: #50	9,486
4th	H.P.S.J.: Mihimaru Ball Mix/So Merry Christmas: Released: November 17, 2004; Format: CD5"; First double A-side; Oricon Top 200 Weekly Peak: #50	4,707
5th	Yurume no Lady (ユルメのレイデ): Released: April 6, 2005; Format: CD5"; Oricon Top 200 Weekly Peak: #37	6,686
6th	Love is…: Released: September 7, 2005; Format: CD5"; Oricon Top 200 Weekly Peak: #26	8,504
7th	Koisuru Kimochi/Yes (恋する気持ち / Yes): Released: November 11, 2005; Format: CD5"; Oricon Top 200 Weekly Peak: #16	34,420
8th	Sayonara no Uta (さよならのうた, Song of Goodbye): Released: March 15, 2006; Format: CD5"; Oricon Top 200 Weekly Peak: #29	6,187
9th	Kibun Jōjō (気分上々↑↑): Released: May 6, 2006; Format: CD5"; Released in two formats: CD-only and CD+DVD; Considered their "big break" single due to highest peak on Oricon charts; Oricon Top 200 Weekly Peak: #7	130,631
10th	Tsuyoku Tsuyoku (ツヨクツヨク): Released: July 12, 2006; Format: CD5"; Oricon Top 200 Weekly Peak: #19	16,760
11th	Itsumademo Hibiku kono Melody/Magical Speaker (いつまでも響くこのMelody / マジカルスピーカー): Released: August 16, 2006; Format: CD5"; Released in three formats: CD+DVD (Itsumademo Hibiku kono Melody version), CD+DVD (Magical Speaker Version), and CD only; Oricon Top 200 Weekly Peak: #3	58,018
12th	Kakegae no Nai Uta (かけがえのない詩): Released: February 28, 2007; Format: CD5"; Released in three versions: CD+DVD Mihimaru version, CD-only Doraemon version, and regular CD-only; Oricon Top 200 Weekly Peak: #6	57,934
13th	Punkish☆ (パンキッシュ☆): Released: April 4, 2007; Format: CD5"; Released in two versions: CD+DVD and CD-only; Oricon Top 200 Weekly Peak: #7	26,428
14th	Gazen Yeah! (俄然Yeah！): Released: August 15, 2007; Format: CD5"; Released in two versions: CD+DVD and CD-only; Oricon Top 200 Weekly Peak: #5	38,963
15th	I Should Be So Lucky/Ai Kotoba (I Should Be So Lucky / 愛コトバ): Released: November 28, 2007; Format: CD5"; Released in two versions: CD+DVD and CD-only; Oricon Top 200 Weekly Peak: #8	44,000+
16th	diverge: Released: January 30, 2008; Format: CD5"; Released in two versions: CD+DVD and CD-only; Oricon Top 200 Weekly Peak: #6	20,450
17th	Girigiri Hero (ギリギリ Hero): Released: April 30, 2008; Format: CD5"; Released in two versions: CD+DVD and CD-only; Oricon Top 200 Weekly Peak: #4	32,269
18th, collaboration with Soffett	Nakinatsu (泣き夏): Released: July 2, 2008; Format: CD5"; Released in two versions: CD+DVD and CD-only; Oricon Top 200 Weekly Peak: #7	15,574
19th	Shiawase ni Narou (幸せになろう): Released: October 22, 2008; Format: CD5"; Released in two versions: CD+DVD and CD-only; Oricon Top 200 Weekly Peak: #4	22,524
20th	Switch: Released: June 17, 2009; Format: CD5"; Released in two versions: CD+DVD and CD-only; Oricon Top 200 Weekly Peak: #7	19,374
21st	Torokechau Dandy (とろけちゃうダンディ〜): Released: July 8, 2009; Format: CD5"; Released in two versions: CD+DVD and CD-only; Oricon Top 200 Weekly Peak: #12	11,771
22nd	Un Lock (アン♡ロック): Released: September 23, 2009; Format: CD5"; Released in three versions: CD-only, CD+DVD, Limited Edition; Oricon Top 200 Weekly Peak: #8	11,024
23rd	Love Letter: Released: February 10, 2010; Format: CD5"; Released in two versions: CD+DVD and CD-only; Oricon Top 200 Weekly Peak: #14	8,146
24th	Omedeto (オメデトウ): Released: April 21, 2010; Format: CD5"; Released in two versions: CD+DVD and CD-only; Oricon Top 200 Weekly Peak: #18	6,620
25th	Masterpiece (マスターピース): Released: June 8, 2011; Format: CD5"; Released in three versions: CD-only, Limited Edition A(CD+DVD), Limited Edition B; Oricon Top 200 Weekly Peak: #20	5,428
26th	Evo★Revolution (エボ ★ レボリューション): Released: August 3, 2011; Format: CD5"; Released in three versions: CD+DVD and CD-only; Oricon Top 200 Weekly Peak: #36	2,998

=== Albums ===
#	Information	Copies sold
1st	Mihimarhythm: Released: September 8, 2004; Format: CD5"; CD+DVD version released on 2007-02-28 for a limited time.; Oricon Top 200 Weekly Peak: #16	46,054
2nd	Mihimalife: Released: December 21, 2005; Format: CD5"; CD+DVD version released on 2007-02-28 for a limited time.; Oricon Top 200 Weekly Peak: #18	58,430
3rd	Mihimagic: Released: September 13, 2006; Format: CD5"; CD+DVD version released on 2007-02-28 for a limited time.; Oricon Top 200 Weekly Peak: #2	279,892
Compilation	Mihimania: Collection Album (Mihimania ～コレクション アルバム～): Released: November 15, 2006; Format: CD5"; Limited to 100,000 copies; Oricon Top 200 Weekly Peak: #10	49,249
Best	The Best of Mihimaru GT: Released: May 2, 2007; Format: CD5"; Released in CD+DVD and CD-only formats; Oricon Top 200 Weekly Peak: #1	383,220
4th	Mihimarise: Released: May 28, 2008; Format: CD5"; Released in CD+DVD and CD-only formats; Oricon Top 200 Weekly Peak: #1	133,344
2nd Compilation	MihimaniaII: Collection Album (MihimaniaII ～コレクション アルバム～): Released: November 19, 2008; Format: CD5"; Released in CD+DVD and CD-only formats; Oricon Top 200 Weekly Peak: #16	13,291
2nd Best	The Best of Asia: Released: September 23, 2009; Format: CD5"; Released in CD-only formats; Oricon Top 200 Weekly Peak: #9	15,782
5th	Mihimalogy: Released: February 24, 2010; Format: CD5"; Released in CD+DVD and CD-only formats; Oricon Top 200 Weekly Peak: #6	28,090
3rd Best	Mihimaballads: Released: June 16, 2010; Format: CD5"; Released in CD+DVD and CD-only formats; Oricon Top 200 Weekly Peak: #4	26,931
6th	Mihimalight: Released: September 7, 2011; Format: CD5"; Released in CD+DVD and CD-only formats; Oricon Top 200 Weekly Peak: #12	12,480
