= Kelun =

Japanese rock band

- Origin: Tokyo, Japan
- Genres: Rock
- Years active: 2005–2009
- Label: SME-Records
- Members: Kyousuke Kozima; Yuki; Masahiro Kaziya
- Past members: Satou Shuusaku
- Website: kelun.jp/

Kelun is a Japanese rock band signed by Sony Music Entertainment Japan.

Kelun was originally a band named UTARI, formed in 2006. Their first album, "UTARI", was released in April. It took the indie charts by storm and the band went on their first tour, dubbed the "February Tour" in February 2007. In September 2007, the band officially changed its name to Kelun.

"Astral Lamp", the band's first CD, was released in November 2007 under Sony Music Entertainment. The anime Gintama used "Signal", from "Astral Lamp", as its 7th ending theme. They debuted a major tour called "Astral Circuit" across Japan.

In February 2008, the band released "Sixteen Girl" as a single. It was chosen by JapanCountdown as its opening theme song. They went on a tour of Kanto in April, dubbed the "April Tour". In May 2008, bassist Satou Shuusaku left and was replaced by Yuki. Kelun's second major single, "Chu-Bura", was released in July 2008 and was used by the anime Bleach as its 8th opening theme, catapulting Kelun to fame.

== Member profiles ==
Ryousuke Kojima (児嶋亮介, Kojima Ryousuke)

- Birthdate: December 5, 1979
- Place of Birth: Chiba Prefecture
- Lead vocalist, lead guitarist, and pianist

Yukito (如人, Yukito)

- Birthdate: February 15
- Place of Birth: Chiba Prefecture
- Bassist

Masahiro Kajitani (梶谷雅弘, Kajitani Masahiro)

- Birthdate: January 20, 1982
- Place of Birth: Tottori Prefecture
- Drummer

== Discography ==
=== Albums and EPs ===
- Astral Lamp (November 21, 2007)
- Kelun (September 3, 2008)

=== Singles ===
- Sixteen Girl (February 20, 2008)
- Chu-Bura (July 2, 2008)
- Hitori Bun No Ai Feat. Ebisu Miho (June 24, 2009)

== In popular culture ==
- "Signal" is the 7th ending theme song for the anime, Gintama.
- "Sixteen Girl" is the opening theme song for the music program, JapanCountdown.
- "Chu-Bura" is the 8th opening theme song for the anime, Bleach.
- "Boys Don't Cry", from the album "KELUN", is the opening theme for the PlayStation Portable game, Bleach: Soul Carnival.
- "Heart Beat" is the opening theme song for the Japanese drama RH Plus.
