= Takanori Nishikawa discography =

T.M.Revolution discography
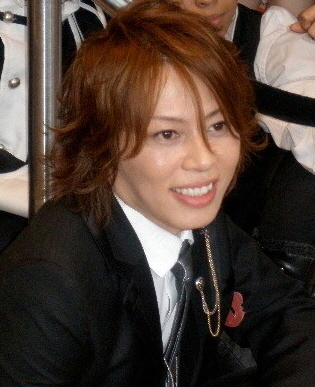
- Nishikawa in 2008
- Studio albums: 10
- Extended plays: 2
- Live albums: 3
- Compilation albums: 4
- Singles: 30

The discography of Japanese pop singer Takanori Nishikawa includes music released under the project names T.M.Revolution and The end of genesis T.M.Revolution turbo type D, and under the artist's own name.

T.M.Revolution released 10 studio albums, 4 compilation albums, 2 live albums, 3 remix or remake albums, 2 extended plays, and multiple singles including collaborations. The end of genesis T.M.Revolution turbo type D released 1 studio album and 3 singles. Under his own name, Takanori Nishikawa has released 2 studio albums and 6 singles.

== As T.M.Revolution ==
=== Studio albums ===
Title	Album details	Peak chart positions	Certifications
Title	Album details	JPN	Certifications
Makes Revolution	Released: August 12, 1996; Label: Antinos Records	20	RIAJ: Gold
Restoration Level➝3 (維新レベル→3)	Released: February 21, 1997; Label: Antinos Records	5	RIAJ: Platinum
Triple Joker	Released: January 21, 1998; Label: Antinos Records	1	RIAJ: 4× Platinum
The Force	Released: March 10, 1999; Label: Antinos Records	2	RIAJ: Million
Progress	Released: October 12, 2000; Label: Antinos Records	3	RIAJ: Gold
Coordinate	Released: March 26, 2003; Label: Antinos Records	9	RIAJ: Gold
Seventh Heaven	Released: March 17, 2004; Label: Epic Records	6	RIAJ: Gold
Vertical Infinity	Released: January 26, 2005; Label: Epic Records	3	RIAJ: Gold
Cloud Nine	Released: April 20, 2011; Label: Epic Records	2	
Ten (天)	Released: May 13, 2015; Label: Epic Records	2	

=== Compilation albums ===
Title	Album details	Peak chart positions	Certifications
Title	Album details	JPN	Certifications
BEST	Released: March 6, 2002; Label: Antinos Records	4	RIAJ: Gold
1000000000000	Released: June 7, 2006; Label: Epic Records	1	RIAJ: Gold
Geisha Boy -Anime Song Experience-	Released: October 9, 2013; Label: Epic Records	6	
2020 -T.M.Revolution All Time Best-	Released: May 11, 2016; Label: Epic Records	1	RIAJ: Gold

=== Live albums ===
Title	Album details	Peak chart positions	Certifications
Title	Album details	JPN	Certifications
T.M.R. Live Revolution 11-12 -Cloud Nine-	Released: September 12, 2012; Label: Epic Records	7	
T.M.R. Live Revolution’17 -Round House Cutback-	Released: March 28, 2018; Label: Epic Records	22	

=== Remix and remake albums ===
Title	Album details	Peak chart positions	Certifications
Title	Album details	JPN	Certifications
DISCORdanza Try My Remix-Single Collections-	Released: June 28, 2000; Label: Antinos Records	4	RIAJ: Gold
UNDER:COVER	Released: January 1, 2006; Label: Epic Records	8	RIAJ: Gold
UNDER:COVER 2	Released: February 27, 2013; Label: Epic Records	4	

=== Extended plays ===
Title	Album details	Peak chart positions	Certifications
Title	Album details	JPN	Certifications
X42S-REVOLUTION	Released: March 24, 2010; Label: Epic Records	4	
宴 -UTAGE-	Released: November 16, 2011; Label: Epic Records	2	

=== Singles ===
Title	Year	Peak chart positions	Certifications	Album
Title	Year	JPN	Certifications	Album
"Dokusai -Monopolize-" (独裁 -monopolize-)	1996	28		Makes Revolution
"Venus" (臍淑女-ヴィーナス-)	1996	35		Makes Revolution
"Heart of Sword～Yoake Mae～" (Heart of Sword～夜明け前～)	1996	16	RIAJ: Gold	Restoration Level➝3
"Level 4"	1997	18	RIAJ: Platinum	Triple Joker
"High Pressure"	1997	4	RIAJ: 2× Platinum	Triple Joker
"White Breath"	1997	1	RIAJ: Million	Triple Joker
"Aoi Hekireki～JOG edit～" (蒼い霹靂～JOG edit～)	1998	3	RIAJ: Platinum	Triple Joker
"Hot Limit"	1998	1	RIAJ: Platinum	The Force
"Thunderbird"	1998	3	RIAJ: Platinum	The Force
"Burnin' Xmas"	1998	2	RIAJ: Platinum	The Force
"Wild Rush"	1999	2	RIAJ: Platinum	The Force
"Black or White? Version 3"	2000	5		Progress
"Heat Capacity"	2000	5		Progress
"Madan～Der Freischutz～" (魔弾～Der Freischütz～)	2000	8		Progress
"Boarding"	2001	5		Coordinate
"Out Of Orbit～Triple Zero～"	2002	6		Coordinate
"Invoke"	2002	2	RIAJ: Gold	Coordinate
"Albireo-アルビレオ-"	2004	3		Seventh Heaven
"Web of Night"	2004	5		Vertical Infinity
"Ignited -イグナイテッド-"	2004	1	RIAJ: Platinum	Vertical Infinity
"Vestige-ヴェスティージ-"	2005	1	RIAJ: Gold	Cloud Nine
"Resonance"	2008	4		Cloud Nine
"Naked Arms/Sword Summit"	2010	3	RIAJ: Gold	Cloud Nine
"Save The One, Save The All"	2010	4		Cloud Nine
"Flags"	2011	4		Ten
"Tsuki Yabureru -Time to Smash!" (突キ破レル -Time to Smash!)	2014	8		Ten
"Phantom Pain"	2014	12		Ten
"Double-Deal"	2015	9		Ten
"Committed Red/Inherit the Force -インヘリット・ザ・フォース-"	2016	10		2020 -T.M.Revolution All Time Best-
"Raimei"	2016	15		Non-album single

=== Collaborations ===
Title	Year	Peak chart positions	Certifications	Album
Title	Year	JPN	Certifications	Album
"Preserved Roses" (with Nana Mizuki)	2013	2	RIAJ: Gold	THE MUSEUM III
"Kakumei Dualism" (革命デュアリズム) (with Nana Mizuki)	2013	2	RIAJ: Gold	THE MUSEUM III

== As The end of genesis T.M.Revolution turbo type D ==
=== Studio albums ===
Title	Album details	Peak chart positions	Certifications
Title	Album details	JPN	Certifications
Suite Season	Released: February 2, 2000; Label: Antinos Records	2	RIAJ: Gold

=== Singles ===
Title	Year	Peak chart positions	Certifications	Album
Title	Year	JPN	Certifications	Album
"陽炎-Kageroh-"	1999	3		Suite Season
"月虹-Gekkoh-"	1999	2		Suite Season
"雪幻-Winter Dust-"	1999	3		Suite Season

== As Takanori Nishikawa ==
=== Studio albums ===
Title	Album details	Peak chart positions	Certifications
Title	Album details	JPN	Certifications
Singularity	Released: March 6, 2019; Label: Epic Records	2	
Singularity 2 -Kakeisei No Protocol- (Singularity II -過形成のprotocol-)	Released: August 10, 2022; Label: Epic Records	11	
Singularity III -Voyage-	Released: February 26, 2025; Label: Epic Records	11	

=== Singles ===
Title	Year	Peak chart positions	Certifications	Album
Title	Year	JPN	Certifications	Album
"Bright Burning Shout"	2018	8		Singularity
"His/Story / Roll The Dice"	2018	14		Singularity
"Crescent Cutlass"	2019	11		Singularity 2 -Kakeisei No Protocol-
"Eden through the rough"	2021	15		Singularity 2 -Kakeisei No Protocol-
"Bucchigire" (一番光れ!-ブッチギレ-)	2022	35		Singularity 2 -Kakeisei No Protocol-
"Never Say Never"	2023	23		Singularity III -Voyage-
"Freedom"	2024	3		Singularity III -Voyage-
"Heroes"	2025	12		Non-album single
"Ignis"	2026	11		Non-album single
