= Abingdon Boys School discography =

- Studio albums: 2
- Live albums: 1
- Compilation albums: 1
- Singles: 9
- Video albums: 3
- Other appearances: 7

The discography of the Japanese rock band Abingdon Boys School includes two studio albums, eight singles, one live album, four video albums, one compilation album, eight soundtrack appearances, and seven other appearances in releases not under that name. Abingdon Boys School (stylized as "abingdon boys school" or abbreviated "a.b.s"), was formed in 2005 by Takanori Nishikawa, or T.M.Revolution, who originally named the band ABS after Ebisu, Tokyo, Japan, (Note: In Japanese, Ebisu has approximately the same pronunciation as the letters A-B-S) and later changed the band's name to Abingdon Boys School, a school formerly attended by members of Radiohead. The band plays alternative rock and is currently signed to Epic Records Japan.

Abingdon Boys School has contributed to the soundtracks of numerous anime and video game series and several tribute albums. Their music has been used as opening or closing tracks for anime series, including Darker than Black, Soul Eater, and Tokyo Magnitude 8.0, and games, including Sengoku Basara. In addition, they have also contributed to tribute albums to the manga Nana and the rock bands Luna Sea and Buck-Tick. They also perform in a live DVD by Buck-Tick.

Both of the band's studio albums reached number two on the Oricon charts. Abingdon Boys School's singles have all charted on the Oricon charts as well; the singles "Blade Chord" and "From Dusk Till Dawn" have peaked at number two and number three respectively. Additionally, the band's four videos have all charted, with Abingdon Boys School Japan Tour 2008 and Abingdon Road Movies both peaking at number ten. Two of the band's releases, the album Abingdon Boys School and the single "Innocent Sorrow", have been certified gold by the Recording Industry Association of Japan.

== Albums ==
=== Studio albums ===
List of studio albums, with selected chart positions
Title	Album details	Peaks	Certifications
Title	Album details	JPN	Certifications
Abingdon Boys School	Released: October 17, 2007; Label: Epic Japan (ESCL-2995); Format: CD, DVD, digital download	2	RIAJ: Gold
Abingdon Road	Released: January 27, 2010; Label: Epic Japan (ESCL-3342); Format: CD, DVD, digital download	2	

=== Compilation albums ===
List of compilation albums
Title	Album details
Teaching Materials	Released: November 7, 2009; Label: Gan-Shin; Format: CD, digital download; Released only in Europe

=== Live albums ===
List of live albums, with selected chart positions
Title	Album details	Peaks
Title	Album details	JPN
Abingdon Boys School Japan Tour 2020	Released: February 16, 2022; Label: Epic Records Japan (ESBL-5614); Format: CD	31

=== Video albums ===
List of video albums, with selected chart positions
Title	Album details	Peaks
Title	Album details	JPN
Abingdon Boys School Japan Tour 2008	Released: July 16, 2008; Label: Epic Japan (ESBL-2257); Format: DVD, Blu-ray	10
Abingdon Road Movies	Released: March 17, 2010; Label: Epic Japan (ESBL-2273/4); Format: DVD	10
Abingdon Boys School Japan Tour 2010	Released: September 29, 2010; Label: Epic Japan (ESBL-2277/8); Format: DVD, Blu-ray	15
Abingdon Boys School Japan Tour 2020	Released: February 16, 2022; Label: Epic Records Japan (ESBL-2613); Format: DVD, Blu-ray	16

== Singles ==
List of singles, with selected chart positions
Title	Year	Peak	Certifications	Album
Title	Year	JPN	Certifications	Album
"Innocent Sorrow"	2006	5	RIAJ: Gold	Abingdon Boys School
"Howling"	2007	4		Abingdon Boys School
"Nephilim"	2007	5		Abingdon Boys School
"Blade Chord"	2007	2		Abingdon Road
"Strength"	2009	4		Abingdon Road
"JAP"	2009	4		Abingdon Road
"Kimi no Uta" (キミノウタ)	2009	8		Abingdon Road
"From Dusk Till Dawn"	2009	3		Abingdon Road
"WE aRE"	2012	8		Non-album single

== Soundtracks ==
List of soundtrack appearances
Title	Year	Soundtrack
"Innocent Sorrow (TV Size)"	2007	D.Gray-man Original Soundtrack 1
"Innocent Sorrow"	2008	D.Gray-man Complete Best
"Strength"	2009	The Best of Soul Eater
"JAP (TV Version)"	2009	Sengoku Basara: Blue Scrolls Music -It's Show Time! CD-
"Kimi no Uta" (キミノウタ)	2009	Tokyo Magnitude 8.0
"From Dusk Till Dawn (TV Size)"	2009	Darker than Black: Kuro no Keiyakusha
"JAP"	2010	Sengoku Basara Anime Best
"Blade Chord" and "JAP"	2010	Sengoku Basara Game Best

== Other appearances ==
Other song appearances
Title	Year	Album
"Stay Away"	2005	Love for Nana -Only 1 Tribute-
"Dress" (ドレス, Doresu)	2005	Parade -Respective Tracks of Buck-Tick-
"Freak Show"	2006	The Songs for Death Note The Movie ~the Last Name Tribute~
"Nephilim"	2007	Tokyo Rock City
"Sweetest Coma Again"	2007	Luna Sea Memorial Cover Album -Re:birth-
"Innocent Sorrow"	2008	Buck-Tick Fest 2007 on Parade
"Valkyrie -Lioleia Mix-"	2009	Monster Hunter 5th Anniversary Collection
