= Abingdon Road (album) =

Studio album by Abingdon Boys School
- Released: January 27, 2010
- Genre: Alternative rock
- Label: Epic Records Japan (ESCL-3342)

Abingdon Boys School chronology
| Abingdon Boys School (2007) | Abingdon Road (2010) |

Abingdon Road is the second album by rock band Abingdon Boys School, released on January 27, 2010. In addition to new tracks, the album contains singles released since the band's first full album and a cover of "Sweetest Coma Again", originally found on Luna Sea Memorial Cover Album -Re:birth-, an album of Luna Sea covers dedicated to the legendary rock band.

The limited edition release will be packaged with a DVD featuring live footage recorded at the Inazuma Rock Festival on September 19, 2009.

== Track listing ==
| No. | Title | Length |
|---|---|---|
| 1. | "Strength" | 4:37 |
| 2. | "Pineapple Army" | 4:35 |
| 3. | "And I Love..." | 5:58 |
| 4. | "Jap" | 4:00 |
| 5. | "Aoi honoo -Souen-" (feat. BASI, Sakkon, FUNKYMIC from Insist) | 3:41 |
| 6. | "Shiosai" | 4:23 |
| 7. | "From Dusk Till Dawn -INCH UP-" | 4:30 |
| 8. | "Siren" | 4:45 |
| 9. | "Blade Chord" | 4:35 |
| 10. | "Kimi no Uta" | 4:12 |
| 11. | "Sweetest Coma Again" (Cover Luna Sea) | 5:31 |
| 12. | "Gold Eclipse" | 1:54 |
| 13. | "Valkyrie -Lioleia Mix-" | 4:42 |
| 14. | "Nocturne" | 1:56 |

== Personnel ==
- T.M. Revolution – vocals
- Hiroshi Shibasaki – guitar
- Sunao – guitar
- Toshiyuki Kishi – keyboard, programming, and turntables
- Ikuo;- Bass
- Hazegawa Koji;- Drums
