= Tenbin (Libra) =

- The regular edition cover

Single by Takanori Nishikawa Featuring ASCA

from the album Singularity II: Kakeisei no Protocol
- Released: May 27, 2020
- Genre: J-pop
- Length: 4:46
- Label: Epic Records Japan
- Songwriter: RUCCA from Elements Garden

Takanori Nishikawa singles chronology
"Real x Eyez" (2020)	"Tenbin (Libra)" (2020)	"As a route of ray" (2020)

Asca singles chronology
"Chain" (2020)	"Tenbin (Libra)" (2020)	"Howling" (2020)

Music video
- "天秤-Libra-" on YouTube

"Tenbin (Libra)" (天秤-Libra-, Balance -LIBRA-) is a song by Japanese pop singer Takanori Nishikawa featuring Asca. It was released on May 27, 2020. It reached number 7 on Oricon and number 45 on Japan Hot 100. It was used as the opening theme song for the anime White Cat Project: Zero Chronicle.

== Release ==
The limited anime edition cover

On 27 January 2020, Colopl revealed that Takanori Nishikawa and Asca would perform "Tenbin (Libra)" (天秤-Libra-, Balance -LIBRA-) as opening theme song for the opening theme song for the anime White Cat Project: Zero Chronicle. The song was released as a single on 27 May 2020 on three edition; Regular edition, Limited edition and Limited anime edition. The single reached number 7 on Oricon, 45 on Japan Hot 100, and 11 on Japan Hot Animation.

== Music video ==
The music video for "Tenbin (Libra)" was directed by A.T. The video features Takanori Nishikawa and ASCA singing with black and white effect. Sometimes scene show Takanori Nishikawa doing backflip and super jump with black effect. Also, some scene show that Takanori Nishikawa hold fire with red effect, while ASCA hold fire with blue effect.

== Track listing ==
All tracks written by Rucca from Elements Garden.

=== Regular edition ===
CD
No.	Title	Length
1.	"Tenbin -LIBRA-" (天秤-Libra- Balance -LIBRA-)	4:46
2.	"Tenbin -LIBRA-" (天秤-Libra- Balance -LIBRA-) (Add'l ZERO CHRONICLE)	4:46
3.	"Tenbin -LIBRA-" (天秤-Libra- Balance -LIBRA-) (Instrumental)	4:46

=== Limited edition ===
CD
No.	Title	Length
1.	"Tenbin -LIBRA-" (天秤-Libra- Balance -LIBRA-)	4:46
2.	"Tenbin -LIBRA-" (天秤-Libra- Balance -LIBRA-) (Instrumental)	4:46

DVD
No.	Title	Length
1.	"Tenbin -LIBRA-" (music video)	4:49
2.	"Making of "Libra"" (music video)

=== Limited anime edition ===
CD
No.	Title	Length
1.	"Tenbin -LIBRA-" (天秤-Libra- Balance -LIBRA-)	4:46
2.	"Tenbin -LIBRA-" (天秤-Libra- Balance -LIBRA-) (White Cat Project: Zero Chronicle OP ver)	1:30

DVD
No.	Title	Length
1.	"Tenbin -LIBRA-" (White Cat Project: Zero Chronicles opening version without credit)	1:32

== Charts ==
Year	Chart	Peak position
2020	Oricon	7
2020	Japan Hot 100	45
2020	Japan Hot Animation	11

== Release history ==
Region	Date	Label	Format	Catalog
Japan	27 May 2020	Epic Records Japan	CD	ESCL-5407
Japan	27 May 2020	Epic Records Japan	CD+DVD	ESCL-5405
Japan	27 May 2020	Epic Records Japan	CD+DVD	ESCL-5408~9
