= Resonance (T.M.Revolution song) =

- CD+Blu-ray Disc format cover

Single by T.M.Revolution

from the album Cloud Nine
- B-side: "Soul's Crossing"
- Released: June 11, 2008
- Genre: J-pop
- Label: Epic Records Japan
- Producer: Daisuke Asakura

T.M.Revolution singles chronology
| "Vestige" (2005) | "Resonance" (2008) | "Naked Arms/Sword Summit" (2010) |

"Resonance" is the twenty-second single from T.M.Revolution released on June 11, 2008, in Japan by Epic Records Japan. It serves as the opening theme to the anime series, Soul Eater. It's B-side, "Soul's Crossing" is used as the theme song to the video game, Soul Eater: Monotone Princess.

It peaked at number four on the Oricon charts, selling over 85,429 copies.

== Overview ==
"Resonance" was released three years after T.M.Revolution's twenty-first single "Vestige". It was released on CD, DVD & Blu-ray.

The music video utilizes segments from his previous videos to make it appear as if he's lip syncing to the song.

== Track listing ==
CD

1. "Resonance"
2. "Soul's Crossing"

DVD/Blu-ray

1. "Resonance" -music clip-

== Charts ==
Weekly charts
| Chart (2008) | Peak position |
|---|---|
| Japan (Oricon) | 4 |

Year-end charts
| Chart (2008) | Position |
|---|---|
| Japan (Oricon) | 87 |

== Certifications ==
| Region | Certification | Certified untis/sales |
|---|---|---|
| Japan (RIAJ) | Gold | 100,000 |

== Release history ==
| Date | Format(s) | Label | Ref. |
|---|---|---|---|
| June 11, 2008 | CD, DVD, Blu-ray | Epic Records Japan | |
| April 01, 2010 | Digital Download | Epic Records Japan | |
