= Makes Revolution =

Studio album by T.M. Revolution
- Released: August 12, 1996
- Recorded: 1996
- Genres: Electro-rock; dance rock; synth-pop; J-pop
- Length: 39:59
- Label: Antinos
- Producer: Daisuke Asakura

T.M. Revolution chronology
Makes Revolution (1996)	Restoration Level➝3 (1997)

Singles from Makes Revolution
- 1. "Dokusai -Monopolize-" Released: May 13, 1996; 2. "Hesoshukujo -Venus-" Released: June 15, 1996

Makes Revolution is the debut studio album by Japanese singer-songwriter T.M. Revolution. The album was released on August 12, 1996, under Antinos Records.

== Background ==
After his departure from the band Luis-Mary, he was scouted by producer Daisuke Asakura who would sign him under FunHouse, now owned by Ariola Japan. On May 25th, 1995, "Black or White?" would be released under the name "Daisuka Asakura expd. Nishikawa Takanori". The single would peak at number 17 on the charts.

== Singles ==
Two singles were released from the album, "Dokusai -Monopolize-" (独裁 -monopolize-), charting at number 28, and "Venus" (臍淑女 -ヴィーナス-), peaking at number 35.

== Release & reception ==
The album would peak at number 20 on the Oricon charts and remained for 31 weeks, selling over 187,000 copies. It would be certified gold in November 1997 by the Recording Industry Association of Japan.

Reviews from CDJournal were positive, with praise towards the albums' techno inspired production and Nishikawa's vocals.

== Track listing ==
No.	Title	Length
1.	"We Make Revolution"	1:25
2.	"Dokusai -Monopolize- ESPECIAL D-Mix (独裁 -monopolize- ESPECIAL D-Mix)"	5:09
3.	"BLACK OR WHITE? ESPECIAL "matt" Mix"	4:39
4.	"PIN-UP LADY"	5:11
5.	"Yume no Shizuku (夢の雫)"	5:21
6.	"URBAN BEASTS"	5:38
7.	"Hesoshukujo -Venus- (臍淑女-ヴィーナス-)"	4:41
8.	"LIAR'S SMILE"	4:26
9.	"HEALING MY SOUL"	3:29

== Charts ==
Chart performance for Makes Revolution
Chart (1996)	Peak position
Japanese Albums (Oricon)	20

== Certifications ==
Region	Certification	Certified untis/sales
Japan (RIAJ)	Gold	100,000

== Release history ==
Date	Edition(s)	Format(s)	Label	Ref.
August 12, 1996	Standard	Cassette; CD	Antinos Records	
June 1, 2002	Re-Issue	CD	Sony Music Entertainment Japan	
June 1, 2016	Standard	Digital Download	Sony Music Entertainment Japan	

== Personnel ==
Adapted from Liner notes.

- Executive Producer: Daisuke Asakura
- Musicians: Tetsuya Katsuragi, JAKE, Eiji Shirasu
- Recording Engineers: Yasuo Matsumoto, Motonari Sakai, Takashi Ikito, Masashi Goto
- Mixing Engineer: Yasuo Matsumoto
- Mastering Engineer: Sanichi Tanaka
- Director: Yuko Abe
- A&R: Isaku Sakanishi
- Executive Producers: Shigeo Maruyama, Takaki Aoki (Real Rocks)
