= Resister (song) =

- The regular edition cover

Single by ASCA

from the album Hyakkaryōran
- B-side: "Michishirube"
- Released: January 13, 2019 (digital); February 27, 2019 (physical)
- Recorded: 2019
- Genre: J-pop
- Length: 3:46
- Label: Sacra Music
- Songwriters: ASCA, Ryosuke Shigenaga
- Producer: ASCA

ASCA singles chronology
"Rin" (2018)	"Resister" (2019)	"Rust/Hibari/Kōbō" (2019)

Alternative cover
- The limited anime edition cover

Music video
- "RESISTER -Short Ver-" on YouTube

"Resister" (stylized as RESISTER) is a song by Japanese pop singer ASCA. It was digitally released on January 13, 2019, before receiving a physical release on February 27, 2019. The song reached number 14 on Oricon and number 21 on Japan Hot 100. It was used as the second opening theme of the anime Sword Art Online: Alicization.

== Release and reception ==
On 9 December 2018, the official website of the anime Sword Art Online: Alicization revealed that the second opening theme song, "Resister," would be performed by ASCA. The song was released digitally on January 13, 2019, before receiving a physical release on February 27, 2019, in three editions: the Regular edition, Limited edition, and Limited anime edition. The single reached number 14 on Oricon, 27 on Japan Hot 100, and 8 on Japan Hot Animation, spending 9, 10 and 11 weeks on each chart, respectively.

In July 2019, "Resister" was certified gold by the Recording Industry Association of Japan (RIAJ) for 100,000 full-track digital ringtone downloads (Chaku Uta Full). The song was featured on her first album Hyakkaryōran (百歌繚乱, Hundred Songs).

== Music video ==
The music video for "Resister" was directed by Atsunori Toshi. The video features ASCA alongside a dancer, singing and dancing inside a factory setting. Some scenes show the dancer shooting a bow, while others depict ASCA and the dancer singing and dancing amid lightning effects. The video ends with ASCA taking a bow.

== Track listing ==
=== Regular edition ===
CD
No.	Title	Length
1.	"RESISTER"	3:46
2.	"Michishirube" (道シルベ Guidepost)	3:41
3.	"Mirage"	3:42
4.	"RESISTER" (Instrumental)	4:05

=== Limited edition ===
CD
No.	Title	Length
1.	"RESISTER"	3:46
2.	"Michishirube" (道シルベ Guidepost)	3:41
3.	"Mirage"	3:42
4.	"Tadaima." (ただいま。 I'm home) (-Studio ver.-)	4:05
5.	"RESISTER" (Instrumental)	3:09

DVD
No.	Title	Length
1.	"RESISTER" (music video)	3:47
2.	"Nisemono no Koi ni Sayounara (with Wakeshima Kanon) (偽物の恋にさようなら)" (music video)	4:15

=== Limited anime edition ===
CD
No.	Title	Length
1.	"RESISTER"	3:46
2.	"Michishirube" (道シルベ Guidepost)	3:41
3.	"Mirage"	3:42
4.	"RESISTER" (Sword Art Online: Alicization OP ver)	1:30

DVD
No.	Title	Length
1.	"RESISTER" (Sword Art Online: Alicization opening version without credit)	1:32

== Personnel ==
Singer and bands

- ASCA - vocals, lyrics (RESISTER, Tadaima)
- Ryosuke Shigenaga - music, arranged, lyrics (RESISTER)
- Saku, Kou Segawa - lyrics (Michishirube, Mirage)
- Sho Horizaki - Bass
- FIRE - Guitar
- Yuya Ishii - Drums
- Tomoe Nakajima, Kiwako Tokunaga, Nao Yamada - Violin & Viola
- Kana Matsuo - Cello

Production

- Satoshi Morishige – record
- Eiichi Nishizawa – record, mixer

== Charts ==
Year	Chart	Peak position
2019	Oricon	14
2019	Japan Hot 100	27
2019	Japan Hot Animation	8

== Certifications ==
Region	Certification	Certified units/sales
Japan (RIAJ)	Gold	100,000^{*}
^{*} Sales figures based on certification alone.

== Release history ==
Region	Date	Label	Format	Catalog
Japan	27 February 2019	Sacra Music	CD	VVCL-1406
Japan	27 February 2019	Sacra Music	CD+DVD	VVCL-1404
Japan	27 February 2019	Sacra Music	CD+DVD	VVCL-1407
