= Abingdon Boys School =

Japanese rock band

- Also known as: a.b.s.
- Origin: Japan
- Genres: Alternative rock; electronic rock; hard rock; alternative metal
- Works: Abingdon Boys School discography
- Years active: 2005–present
- Labels: Epic Records Japan, Gan-Shin (EU)
- Members: Takanori Nishikawa; Sunao; Hiroshi Shibasaki; Toshiyuki Kishi

Abingdon Boys School (stylized as abingdon boys school and abbreviated a.b.s.) is a Japanese rock band formed in 2005. It consists of vocalist Takanori Nishikawa, guitarists Sunao and Hiroshi Shibasaki, and keyboardist Toshiyuki Kishi. They have released two studio albums, Abingdon Boys School (2007) and Abingdon Road (2010), both of which reached the number two position on Japan's Oricon chart.

== History ==
=== Formation ===
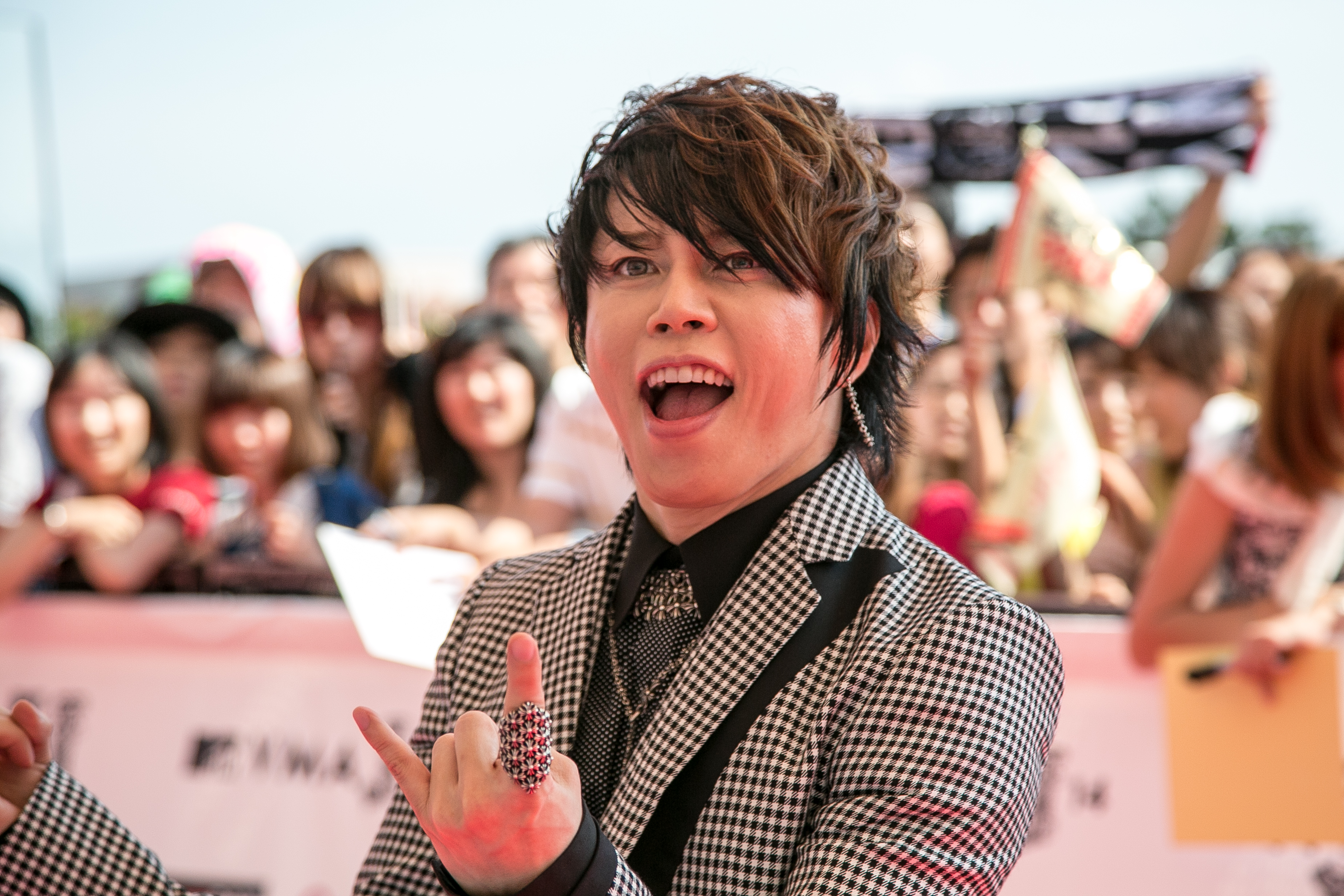
Takanori Nishikawa formed Abingdon Boys School out of a desire to return to his roots in a rock band.

Abingdon Boys School began in 2005 when Takanori Nishikawa, known for his pop music under the name T.M.Revolution, decided to return to his rock roots in Luis-Mary with Sunao, a guitarist who supported him in his solo career. They were introduced to guitarist Hiroshi Shibasaki (ex-Wands) after Nishikawa publicly praised his band Al.ni.co on the radio show that he did for All Night Nippon. Shibasaki then joined the T.M.Revolution backing band as well. They continued to discuss forming a new band, when Tetsu suggested they contribute to a tribute album being made for the manga series Nana. Programmer and producer Toshiyuki Kishi was a classmate of Shibasaki's in music school who had handed Nishikawa a demo of what he was working on. The group decided to work on that song, and "forced" Kishi to join the band while in the studio.

The group's original name of A.B.S. came from Nishikawa's love of cars, which have anti-lock braking systems. He then noticed how the initials resembled the pronunciation of Ebisu, the Tokyo district where the band practiced. When searching books for a backronym, the singer discovered Abingdon School and the connection to Radiohead, whose members are of the same generation. As the members of Abingdon Boys School are also all from the same generation and each fell in love with music when they were in school, they thought "it would be cool if we could go back to that feeling again."

=== Career ===
Abingdon Boys School released their first song "Stay Away", an English-language track written by Nishikawa and composed by Shibasaki, on the 2005 Nana tribute album Love for Nana ~Only 1 Tribute~. The band also recorded a cover of the Buck-Tick song "Dress" for their tribute album, Parade -Respective Tracks of Buck-Tick-. The group's first live concert was performed on November 24, 2005, alongside Uverworld and Tsubakiya Quartet, as a show presented by music magazine CD Data.

On September 3, 2006, Abingdon Boys School announced that they would make their official debut through Epic Records Japan, which was also the label of Nishikawa's solo career. Their first single, "Innocent Sorrow", was released on December 6, 2006. It was used as the opening theme of the D.Gray-man anime adaptation. That same month, the song "Fre@k $HoW" was contributed to a tribute compilation for the film Death Note 2: The Last Name. "Howling" followed in May 2007 was used in Darker Than Black. Their third single, "Nephilim", was released on July 4 and used in the PlayStation 3 game Folklore. Three days later, the band performed at the Japanese date of Live Earth in Tokyo on July 7. On September 8, they played at the Buck-Tick Fest 2007 On Parade event alongside acts such as Kiyoharu, J, Masami Tsuchiya and Michiro Endo. Their first album, the self-titled Abingdon Boys School, was released on October 17, 2007, and reached number two on the Oricon Albums Chart. The single "Blade Chord" was used for the Sengoku Basara 2 video game. On July 16, 2008, Abingdon Boys School released a live DVD from a concert they held in February 2008.

"Strength", released on February 25, 2009, was used in the Soul Eater anime adaptation. It was followed in May by "Jap", which was used in the Sengoku Basara Battle Heroes video game opening song and Sengoku Basara: Samurai Kings Season 1 opening song. Abingdon Boys School's seventh single "Kimi no Uta" was the opening theme song of Tokyo Magnitude 8.0. The group signed a record deal with the German label Gan-Shin. A compilation album titled Teaching Materials was released only in Europe on November 7, 2009. That month, the band went on a tour through Europe, playing shows in Helsinki, Stockholm, Hamburg, Berlin, Munich, Paris, London and Moscow. In London, the quartet played at Camden Underworld, a venue famous in Japan as it was the place where Sadistic Mika Band played in 1975 as the first Japanese rock band to ever tour Europe. In Helsinki, Andy McCoy of the Finnish rock band Hanoi Rocks showed up unannounced, one of the group's idols. "From Dusk Till Dawn", Abingdon Boys School's December 16 single, was recorded with Shinya on drums and used as the ending theme of Darker than Black: Gemini of the Meteor.

On January 27, 2010, the band's second studio album Abingdon Road was released. In addition to six new tracks, it contains the singles released after their first album and a cover of Luna Sea's "Sweetest Coma Again", which Abingdon Boys School had originally contributed to 2007's Luna Sea Memorial Cover Album -Re:birth-. They released a book containing scores for their singles on November 12, 2010.

On August 7, 2012, Abingdon Boys School released "We Are", their first single in two and a half years. It was featured as the theme song of the PlayStation 3 video game Sengoku Basara HD Collection, which was released on September 5.

Abingdon Boys School performed at Inazuma Rock Festival 2018, marking their first live in six years. They performed at the festival again the following year and announced their first tour in 10 years for March 2020. However, the tour was cancelled due to the COVID-19 pandemic in Japan. As such, the band instead performed a concert that was broadcast on WOWOW on December 30, 2020. It was later released in February 2022 as their first live album and first home video release in 11 years.

== Musical style ==
Music website Barks described Abingdon Boys School's music as having a "free-spirited, hard-hitting musicality, reminiscent of alternative rock." According to Robert Michael Poole of The Japan Times, the band's music consists of "glossy rock-guitar solos, harmonized choruses and pummeling drums", and recalls 1980s era Van Halen and edgier 1990s acts such as Jane's Addiction. All four members bring songs to the rest of the band via their own demo tapes. They then gather in a studio to play and discuss them, with Nishikawa's lyrics added last. The singer described his three bandmates' individual composing styles. Kishi's background is in instrumental music they called "art-work", but Nishikawa said he has a sense of Japanese melodies, so "emotional, internal lyrics fit his music better". The vocalist described Sunao as being indifferent about details, so his music allows them to "go wild". He then said Shibasaki's music is the most difficult for him; "He imagines Japanese lyrics, but I feel like putting English on all of the bass lines. (laugh) Usually Japanese lyrics feature a lot of consonants, but in his case the vowel sounds are really strong so I sometimes think" it is impossible.

== Members ==
- Takanori Nishikawa (西川貴教, Nishikawa Takanori) – vocals
- Hiroshi Shibasaki (柴崎 浩, Shibasaki Hiroshi) – guitar
- Sunao – guitar
- Toshiyuki Kishi (岸 利至, Kishi Toshiyuki) – keyboards, turntables, programming

=== Support members ===
- Ikuo – bass guitar
- Koji Hasegawa (長谷川 浩二, Hasegawa Kōji) – drums

== Discography ==
Studio albums

- Abingdon Boys School (2007)
- Abingdon Road (2010)
