= White Cat Project =

2014 action role-playing video game

- Cover of the 2015 official fan book, featuring the three main characters (Hero, Iris and Catra) alongside event-exclusive characters

白猫プロジェクト (Shironeko Purojekuto)
- Genre: Adventure, fantasy
- Video game
- Developer: Colopl
- Publisher: Colopl
- Directed by: Ryōji Tsunoda
- Produced by: Hiroki Asai
- Genre: Action role-playing game
- Platform: iOS, Android
- Released: July 14, 2014
- Video game

White Cat Tennis
- Developer: Colopl
- Publisher: Colopl
- Genre: Sports
- Platform: iOS, Android
- Released: July 31, 2016
- Manga

Shironeko Project Hikoujima Kouen
- Written by: Colopl
- Illustrated by: Tsurujirou Matsudaira
- Published by: Kodansha
- Magazine: Comic Clear
- Original run: July 2017 – July 2018
- Volumes: 3
- Manga

Zero Chronicle
- Written by: Yuichi Tobiyama
- Illustrated by: Fuku Kitsune
- Published by: Kadokawa Shoten
- Published: April 1, 2020
- Anime television series

Zero Chronicle
- Directed by: Masato Jinbo
- Written by: Masato Jinbo
- Music by: Taku Iwasaki
- Studio: Project No.9
- Licensed by: Crunchyroll
- Original network: AT-X, Tokyo MX, BS11
- Original run: April 6, 2020 – June 22, 2020
- Episodes: 12
- Video game

Shironeko Project Infinity
- Developer: Colopl
- Publisher: Colopl
- Genre: Action game
- Platform: Nintendo Switch, Nintendo Switch 2
- Released: 2027

White Cat Project (Japanese: 白猫プロジェクト, Hepburn: Shironeko Purojekuto) is a free-to-play action role-playing game developed and published by Colopl for Android and iOS. It was initially released in Japan on July 14, 2014. An English version was released internationally under the title Colopl Rune Story and operated from July 23, 2015, to October 7, 2016. A spinoff title, White Cat Tennis (白猫テニス, Shironeko Tenisu) was released on both iOS and Android on July 31, 2016, while the upcoming action spinoff Shironeko Project Infinity will be released on the Nintendo Switch and Nintendo Switch 2 in 2027.

An anime adaptation of the game's third anniversary event produced by Project No.9 aired from April 6 to June 22, 2020.

== Plot ==
A long time ago, there is an ancient legend revolving around two figures, the White Maiden of the Sky; represented by the White Cat, and the Black Prince of Darkness; represented by the Black Cat. At the same time, a war between the demons and the guardians of light took place, with the demons led by the Black King of Darkness attacking the lands in the sky. The Black Prince however, despite the wishes of the Black King, defied his orders and falls in love with the White Maiden, in hopes that their union would end the war. Both were not meant to meet and love each other as the war ravaged the world around the land and the skies.

Several millennia after the war, in a world consisting of numerous isles, a young hero from the Astora Isle encounters the adventurer Kyle and follows him on an expedition on the isle. They meet a mysterious girl named Iris and a talking white cat named Catra, and together they make their way to the isle's ruins, where they find a flying island. Kyle becomes consumed by darkness there, and the party resolves to travel to the ends of the world on the flying island in order to find the seven "Great Runes", following Kyle's words before he disappeared. Upon their adventures towards finding the Runes, both the hero and Iris start to fill the pieces, meeting friends and enemies and discovering their true identities.

== Gameplay ==
White Cat Project is an action role-playing game with touchscreen controls, where the player controls the character by dragging the finger across the screen (a mechanic Colopl calls "Punicon") and tapping to attack. Special abilities can be activated by holding the finger on the character, which opens up a selection menu of abilities. All of these actions can be done using one finger only, which facilitates one-handed gaming.

The characters also have their own classes corresponding to weapon types, for example swords, bows, and mage staffs. In general, most characters are gained via a "Summon" tab which works on a gacha system. Runes are spent on randomized characters, with some characters being common and other characters being rare. Some characters can be gained for free by completing in-game missions. While the game is fully playable as a single-player experience, it also supports up to four-player co-operative multiplayer. There is also a town-building mode where players can build and upgrade structures that generate in-game currencies and provide combat bonuses to their characters. Unlike many free-to-play games, White Cat Project has no stamina system.

== Media ==
=== Video games ===
White Cat Project was released in Japan on July 14, 2014, on iOS and Android platforms. The theme song for the game is titled "Stand Up!", performed by Yui Horie. An international English version operated from July 23, 2015, until its closure on October 7, 2016. In January 2015, Colopl released a VR version of White Cat Project for the Oculus Rift. Named Shironeko VR Project, the game can be controlled with a gamepad, keyboard and mouse, or on a smartphone. A spinoff tennis game featuring characters from White Cat Project was released in July 2016 under the name White Cat Tennis. The "Punicon" controls from White Cat Project are used here as well. A new action RPG tentatively named Shironeko New Project was announced for the Nintendo Switch, originally slated for release in 2020 in Japan and later delayed indefinitely. In July 2026, Colopl announced that Shironeko Project Infinity would be released for the Nintendo Switch and Nintendo Switch 2 in 2027 in Japan.

In January 2018, Nintendo filed a lawsuit against Colopl over five patent infringements found in White Cat Project. These include "the special technology used to operate a joystick over a touch panel", first patented by Nintendo for its Nintendo DS wrist strap that Nintendo claims Colopl had used for its "Punicon" controls. Nintendo later added a sixth patent infringement to the proceedings, and seeks 4.4 billion yen in damages plus late fees, in addition to an injunction on the operation of the White Cat Project smartphone app. Colopl changed the game's control mechanics in February 2020 in response to the lawsuit. Colopl eventually paid Nintendo the equivalent of $30 million US dollars in a settlement.

=== Anime ===
An anime adaptation of the game, titled White Cat Project: Zero Chronicle (白猫プロジェクト ZERO CHRONICLE, Shironeko Purojekuto ZERO CHRONICLE), which adapts the in-game "Zero Chronicle – The first sin" prologue event, was announced during the Colopl 10th Anniversary event and aired from April 6 to June 22, 2020. It was animated by Project No.9, with Masato Jinbo directing and writing the series, Yousuke Okuda designing the characters, and Taku Iwasaki composing the music. Takanori Nishikawa and ASCA performed the series' opening theme song "Tenbin -LIBRA-" (天秤-Libra-, Balance -LIBRA-), while Rei Yasuda performed the series' ending theme song "through the dark". Funimation had acquired the anime series, and they streamed it on its platforms. Following Sony's acquisition of Crunchyroll, the series was moved to Crunchyroll.

==== Episodes ====
No.	Title (Note: All English titles are taken from Funimation.)	Original release date
1	"The Land Protected by Light"; Transliteration: "Hikari ni Mamorareshi kuni" (Japanese: 光に守られし国)	April 6, 2020
2	"The World's Egoism"; Transliteration: "Sekai no Wagamama" (Japanese: 世界の我儘)	April 13, 2020
3	"The Grief-stricken Queen of Light"; Transliteration: "Shūshō no Hikari no Ou" (Japanese: 愁傷の光の王)	April 20, 2020
4	"The Messenger from Black"; Transliteration: "Kuro no Tsukai" (Japanese: 黒の使い)	April 27, 2020
5	"United Front"; Transliteration: "Kyōtō" (Japanese: 共闘)	May 4, 2020
6	"The Gray-Green Demoness"; Transliteration: "Hai midori no Mashō" (Japanese: 灰緑の魔障)	May 11, 2020
7	"Picking Wild Greens"; Transliteration: "Sansaitori" (Japanese: 山菜採り)	May 18, 2020
8	"A Promise"; Transliteration: "Yakusoku" (Japanese: 約束)	May 25, 2020
9	"The Queen of Light and the Prince of Darkness"; Transliteration: "Hikari no Ou to Yami no Oji" (Japanese: 光の王と闇の王子)	June 1, 2020
10	"The Gentle Song of Darkness"; Transliteration: "Yasashiki yami no Shi" (Japanese: やさしき闇の詩)	June 8, 2020
11	"The Distant Sky"; Transliteration: "Haruka tenkū" (Japanese: はるか天空)	June 15, 2020
12	"The Sin of Beginning"; Transliteration: "Hajimari no Tsumi" (Japanese: はじまりの罪)	June 22, 2020

== Reception ==
Reception

Review score
Publication	Score
Gamezebo	2.5/5

On July 18, 2014, White Cat Project reached the top of Google Play Japan's ranking of newly released free apps, four days after release on Android. It reached 1 million downloads six days later, becoming the fastest growing app in Colopl's history. It soon became Japan's fastest growing smartphone game, having amassed 10 million downloads a little more than a month later on August 30. It reached 100 million downloads on June 27, 2016.

The game won the award for "Best Game of 2014" in Google Play Japan and in "Best iPhone Game" and "Best iPad Game" in Japan's App Store Best of 2014 awards. It also won the "Excellence" award in the Famitsu Awards in 2014 and 2015.

Colopl was sued by Nintendo in 2016 on claims that White Cat Project violated five of Nintendo's patents. While Colopl initially defended itself in the lawsuit, the company announced in August 2021 that they agreed to settle with Nintendo for ¥3.3 billion (approximately US$30 million) as to "resolve the matter as soon as possible". The settlement allows Colopl to license Nintendo's patents for White Cat Project and other games.
