= Asca (singer) =

Japanese singer (born 1996)

Asuka Ōkura 大倉 明日香
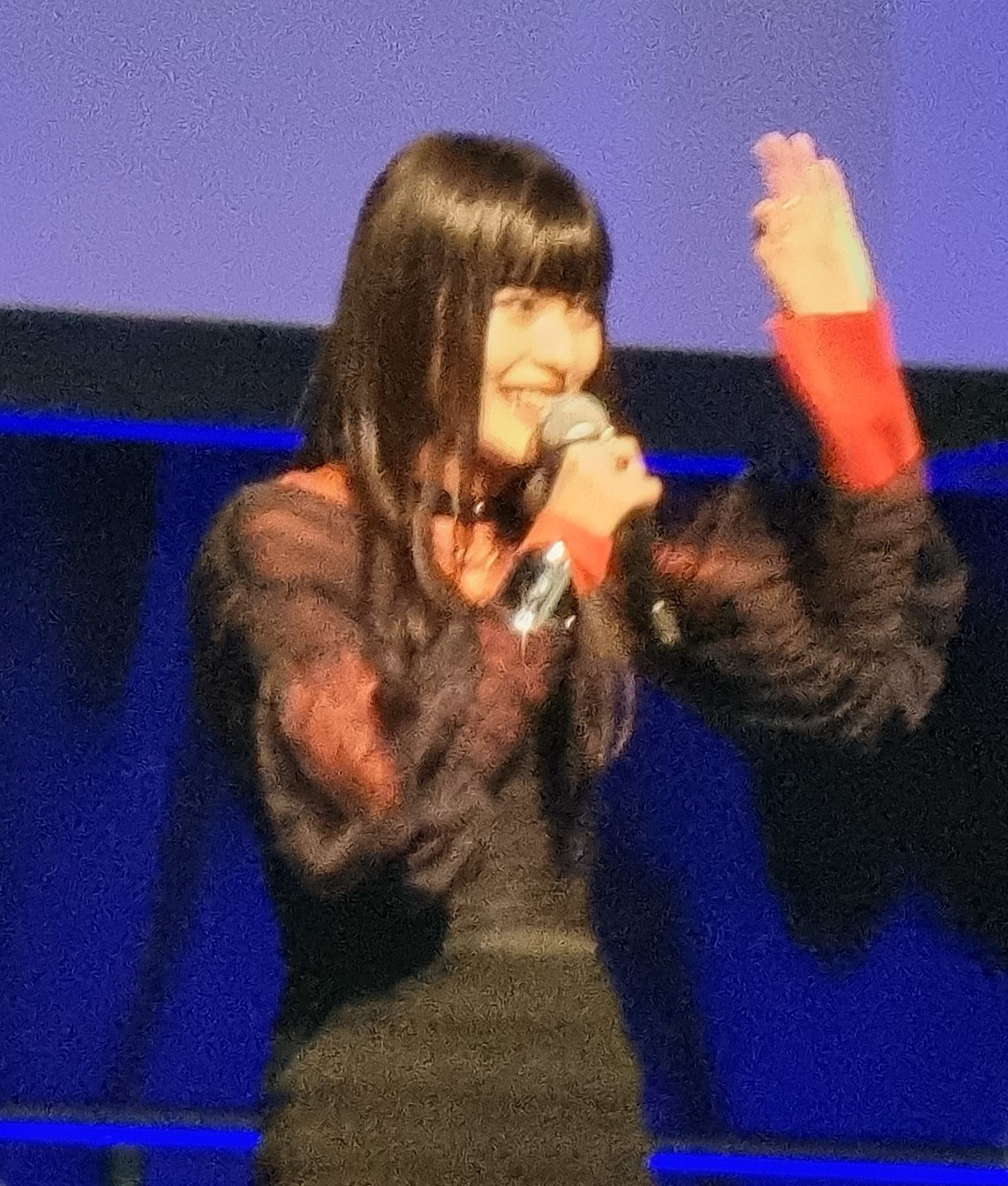
- Asca performing on stage at Crunchyroll Expo Australia 2022 in Melbourne

Background information
- Also known as: ASCA
- Born: September 5, 1996 (age 30); Aichi Prefecture, Japan
- Genres: J-pop; anison
- Years active: 2013, 2016–present
- Labels: Media Factory (2013); Sony Music (2016–present); Sacra Music (2017–present)
- Website: www.asca-official.com

Asuka Ōkura (大倉 明日香, Ōkura Asuka; born September 5, 1996), also known by the stage name Asca (stylized in all caps), is a Japanese singer and musician signed to Sony Music and Sacra Music. She made her debut in 2013 after becoming a finalist at the 5th Animax All-Japan Anisong Grand Prix. After focusing on her studies, she resumed her music career in late 2016. Her songs have been featured in many anime series, such as Sword Art Online, Fate/Apocrypha, Darwin's Game, Edens Zero, and The Irregular at Magic High School.

== Biography ==
=== Early life ===
Ōkura was born in Aichi Prefecture on September 5, 1996. She had aspired to become a musician since she was in elementary school, at which time she also become interested in anime music. She became interested in singing after listening to the song "I believe" by Ayaka, and songs by BoA and Dreams Come True. During her second year in junior high school, her older sister, who had begun taking music lessons, encouraged her to do the same. Afterwards, she started playing in a band, with herself on vocals and her sisters playing instruments.

=== Career ===
At the encouragement of her music teacher, she decided to audition for the 5th Animax All-Japan Anisong Grand Prix in 2011. She became a finalist in the contest, which was eventually won by Konomi Suzuki. Although she did not win the contest, as a finalist, Ōkura was offered a one-year contract with music label Media Factory. After a year had passed and as the contract was about to expire, it was decided that she would make her music debut. She released her first single "Prime Number: Kimi to Deaeru Hi" (Prime number ~君と出会える日~) on March 11, 2013; the title song is used as the second ending theme to the anime television series The Pet Girl of Sakurasou. After the release of the single, she put her career on hold to focus on her high school studies.

After she graduated from high school, Ōkura resumed her music career in 2016. Her first post-comeback release was the mini-album Days, which was released digitally on December 21, 2016. The following year, she moved to the record label Sacra Music and began using the stage name Asca. Her next release was the song "Rust", which was included in the August 2017 issue of LisAni magazine. Her second single "Koe" was released digitally on November 12, 2017, and received a physical release on November 22, 2017; the title track is used as the second ending theme to the anime television series Fate/Apocrypha.

Asca's third single "Pledge" was released digitally on February 16, 2018, and received a physical release on February 21, 2018; the song is used as the ending theme of anime Record of Grancrest War Her fourth single "Rin" (凜, Cold) was released digitally on May 4, 2018, and received a physical release on May 9, 2018; the song is used as the second opening theme of anime Record of Grancrest War She released three collaborated singles "Ain Soph Aur" (アインソフオウル, Limitless Light) with Ayasa, "Nisemono no Koi ni Sayounara" (偽物の恋にさようなら, Goodbye to Fake Love) with Kanon Wakeshima, and "Suspected, Confused and Action" with Boku no Lyric no Boyomi digitally on September 24, 2018, October 29, 2018, and November 30, 2018, respectively.

Asca's fifth single "Resister" was released digitally on January 13, 2019 and received a physical release on February 27, 2019; the song "Resister" was used as the second opening theme for the anime Sword Art Online: Alicization, while the song "Mirage" was used as the theme song for the VR game Tokyo Chronos. ASCA is featured on Hiroyuki Sawano's song "Unti-L", under the name "SawanoHiroyuki[nZk]:ASCA"; the track appears on Sawano's album "R∃/MEMBER". Her sixth single "Rust/Hibari/Kōbō" was released on September 4, 2019. "Hibari" was released digitally on July 14, 2019, and is used as the ending theme to the anime series The Case Files of Lord El-Melloi II, while "Kōbō" is used as the insert song of VR game Tokyo Chronos.

Asca released her first album titled Hyakkaryōran (百花繚乱, Hundred Songs) on November 6, 2019. The album included her song Selfrontier (セルフロンティア) that was used as the opening theme song in the game Sword Art Online: Alicization Rising Steel. Her seventh single "Chain" was released digitally on January 18, 2020 and received a physical release on February 26, 2020; the title track is used as the opening theme to the anime series Darwin's Game. She collaborated with Takanori Nishikawa in performing the song "Tenbin -LIBRA-" (天秤-Libra-, Balance -LIBRA-) that was released on May 27, 2020; the song is used as the opening theme in the anime series White Cat Project: Zero Chronicle.

Asca's eighth single "Howling" was released digitally on October 4, 2020, and was released November 4, 2020; the title track is used as the opening theme to the second season of the anime series The Irregular at Magic High School. The single itself includes a cover of Garnidelia's second single "Grilletto," which was used as the second opening of the first season of the same anime. Asca also performed the ending theme song of the second season of the anime series Edens Zero; the song, "Rinne", was released as a single on April 2, 2023. Later that year, she sang the song "Watashi ga Warau Riyū wa" (私が笑う理由は), which was used as the opening theme to the anime series Butareba: The Story of a Man Turned into a Pig. In 2024 she sang the song "Shion no Hanataba o" (紫苑の花束を), which was used as the third ending theme to the third season of The Irregular at Magic High School. She also performed the songs "Faceless" and "Ashita Sekai ga Owaru to Shite mo" (明日世界が終わるとしても), which were used as the opening themes to the anime series Bye Bye, Earth and Demon Lord, Retry! R respectively. In 2026, her songs "Double Wings" and "Remedy" were used as the opening and ending themes respectively to the anime series Magical Explorer.

== Discography ==
=== As Asuka Ōkura ===
==== Mini albums ====
Title	Details
Days (Indies)	Released: December 21, 2016; Format: Digital download

==== Singles ====
Title	Details	Peak Oricon chart positions
"Prime number ~Kimi to Deaeru Hi~" (君と出会える日, The Day I Can Meet You)	Released: February 27, 2013	40

=== As ASCA ===
==== Albums ====
Title	Details	Peak Oricon chart positions
Hyakkaryōran (百歌繚乱, Hundred Songs)	Released: November 6, 2019; Label: Sacra Music (VVCL-1525, VVCL-1527, VVCL-1529); Format: CD, CD+BD	11
Hyakki Yakō (百希夜行, Night Parade of One Hundred Demons)	Released: January 27, 2021; Label: Sacra Music (VVCL-1812, VVCL-1815, VVCL-1817); Format: CD, CD+BD	23
Vivid	Released: March 13, 2024; Label: Sacra Music; Format: CD, CD+BD	38

==== Extended plays ====
Title	Details	Peak Oricon chart positions
Kimi ga Mita Yume no Monogatari (君が見た夢の物語, The Story of the Dream You Had)	Released: January 26, 2022; Label: Sacra Music (VVCL-1999, VVCL-2000, VVCL-1997); Format: CD, CD+BD	28

==== Singles ====
Title	Details	Peak Oricon chart positions	Album
"Rust"	Released: August, 2017	—	Hyakkaryōran (百歌繚乱, Hundred Songs)
"KOE" (Voice)	Released: November 22, 2017	33	Hyakkaryōran (百歌繚乱, Hundred Songs)
"Pledge"	Released: February 21, 2018	92	Hyakkaryōran (百歌繚乱, Hundred Songs)
"Rin" (凜, Cold)	Released: May 9, 2018	44	Hyakkaryōran (百歌繚乱, Hundred Songs)
"Resister"	Released: February 27, 2019	14	Hyakkaryōran (百歌繚乱, Hundred Songs)
"RUST/Hibari/Kōbō" (RUST/雲雀/光芒, Rust/Skylark/Beam of Light)	Released: September 4, 2019	20	Hyakkaryōran (百歌繚乱, Hundred Songs)
"Chain"	Released: February 26, 2020	26	Hyakki Yakō (百希夜行, Night Parade of One Hundred Demons)
"Howling"	Released: November 4, 2020	20	Hyakki Yakō (百希夜行, Night Parade of One Hundred Demons)
"Carpe Diem / Villain"	Released: June 2, 2021	25	Non-album singles
"Rinne"	Released: April 26, 2023	36	Non-album singles
"Watashi ga Warau Wake ha"	Released: November 15, 2023	43	Non-album singles
"—" denotes releases that were ineligible to chart. (Note: As a bonus CD released with issues of the anime music magazine LisAni!, these songs were ineligible to chart on the Oricon singles chart.)

==== Digital singles ====
Title	Details	Album
"Ain Soph Aur" (アインソフオウル, Limitless Light) (with Ayasa)	Released: September 24, 2018	Hyakkaryōran (百歌繚乱, Hundred Songs)
"Nisemono no Koi ni Sayounara" (偽物の恋にさようなら, Goodbye to Fake Love) (with Kanon Wakeshima)	Released: October 29, 2018	Hyakkaryōran (百歌繚乱, Hundred Songs)
"Suspected, Confused and Action" (under the name ASCA VS Boku no Lyric no Boyomi)	Released: November 30, 2018	Hyakkaryōran (百歌繚乱, Hundred Songs)
"Inochi No Akashi" (命ノ証, Proof of Life)	Released: July 18, 2021	Non-album singles
"Gyakkyou Spectrum" (逆境スペクトル, Adversity Spectrum)	Released: November 27, 2021	Non-album singles
"Kimi ga Mita Yume no Monogatari" (君が見た夢の物語, The Story of the Dream You Had)	Released: January 1, 2022	Non-album singles
"Saiu Umononi" (サウイウモノニ)	Released: July 20, 2022	Non-album singles

==== Collaboration singles ====
Title	Details	Peak Oricon chart positions	Album
"Tenbin -LIBRA-" (天秤-Libra-, Balance -LIBRA-) (with Takanori Nishikawa)	Released: May 27, 2020	7	Hyakki Yakō (百希夜行, Night Parade of One Hundred Demons)
"Sо̄kyū no Fanfare" (蒼穹のファンファーレ, Fanfare of the Blue Sky) (with FictionJunction, Eir Aoi, ReoNa)	Released: October 28, 2022	—	Non-album single

==== Guest appearances ====
Title	Year	Album	Artist
"Unti-L"	2019	R∃/MEMBER (Note: "Unti-L" is also included on the album Hyakkaryōran (百歌繚乱, Hundred Songs); this version is titled "Unti-L <100S-R2>". ASCA is collaborated with Mizuki in this version.)	SawanoHiroyuki[nZk]
