= Abingdon Boys School (album) =

Studio album by Abingdon Boys School
- Released: October 17, 2007
- Recorded: 2006/2007
- Genre: Alternative rock
- Length: 59:58
- Label: Epic Records Japan (ESCL-2995)

Abingdon Boys School chronology
Abingdon Boys School (2007)	Abingdon Road (2010)

Abingdon Boys School (typeset as abingdon boys school) is the debut album by rock band Abingdon Boys School.

== Overview ==
The initial release date was for October 10 but the album was delayed so the production staff could better promote the album. It was released on October 17, 2007, through Epic Records Japan. There are two versions, a standard edition and a limited edition, the latter containing a DVD of music videos and live performances. The album features their three previous singles, as well as a remix of b-side, "Lost Reason" featuring Micro of Home Made Kazoku. It also features a song used on a tribute album for the Nana manga as well as a cover of a Buck-Tick song, entitled "Dress".

== Music style ==
The music is mixture of hard rock guitars and drums and electronic/techno beats. The lyrics of the songs are a mixture of English and Japanese, with the exception of Rebirth + Reverse which is an instrumental track. Athena, Via Dolorosa, Howling, Nephilim and Innocent Sorrow are sung in Japanese, except for occasional English vocals.

== Track listing ==
All lyrics are written by Takanori Nishikawa; all music is composed by Hiroshi Shibasaki except where noted.

No.	Title	Length
1.	"As One"	3:44
2.	"HOWLING -INCH UP-"	4:40
3.	"Via Dolorosa"	5:01
4.	"INNOCENT SORROW"	4:17
5.	"DOWN TO YOU"	4:45
6.	"Athena" (アテナ)	4:51
7.	"stay away"	4:03
8.	"Nephilim"	4:23
9.	"LOST REASON" (featuring MICRO from HOME MADE 家族, Nishikawa/Micro)	5:17
10.	"DESIRE"	5:17
11.	"Dress" (ドレス, Atsushi Sakurai/Hidehiko Hoshino, this song is a cover, originally by "Buck-Tick".)	6:41
12.	"ReBirth+ReVerse" (music by Toshiyuki Kishi)	7:03

== Charts ==
Chart	Peak position
Oricon Weekly Chart	2

Total Reported Sales: 69,796*
