= Triple Joker =

Studio album by T.M. Revolution
- Released: January 21, 1998
- Recorded: 1997
- Genres: J-pop, dance-pop, pop rock
- Length: 53:38
- Label: Antinos Records
- Producer: Daisuke Asakura

T.M. Revolution chronology
Restoration Level➝3 (1997)	Triple Joker (1998)	The Force (1999)

Singles from Triple joker
- 1. "Level 4" Released: April 21, 1997; 2. "High Pressure" Released: June 1, 1997; 3. "White Breath" Released: October 22, 1997; 4. "Aoi Hekireki 〜JOG edit〜" Released: February 25, 1998

Triple Joker (stylized as triple joker) is the third studio album by T.M.Revolution. Released on January 21, 1998, under Antinos Records.

== Singles & promotion ==
Four singles would be released from the album, with "White Breath" becoming the most successful, peaking at number 1, and charting for 18 weeks. He would later perform the song at the 48th NHK Kōhaku Uta Gassen and Pop Jam.

"Level 4", being its lead single, peaked at number 18 and would chart for 35 weeks, it was used for the commercial theme song for the Playstation 1 game, Motor Toon Grand Prix: USA Edition.

"High Pressure", released on October 22, charted at number 4 and remained for 24 weeks. It would be covered on the rhythm game, The Idolmaster Cinderella Girls: Starlight Stage. On July 22, 2023, the song was performed on the Fuji TV special, FNS27 Hour TV alongside Hoikenda.

Due to the success of the album, "Aoi Hekireki" would be released as a bonus single, which was also a success, reaching number 3 and staying for 10 weeks.

== Commercial performance ==
The album charted at Number 1 on the Oricon albums chart selling over 1,650,740 copies, making it his best-selling album to date. It was nominated for Rock Album of The Year at the 13th Japan Gold Disc Awards. During T.M.R.'s live concert at Nippon Budokan on March 29, 1998, it was announced that the album had sold over 2 million copies.

== Reception ==
Triple joker received a positive review from music website, CDJournal, complementing the albums melodies and lyrics.

A retrospective review by OKMusic was positive, praising its first song, "Aoi Hekireki" as the highlight track from the album, stating "demonstrates how outstanding the melodies on "triple joker" truly are." The editor also commended Inoue and Asakura's role in the production of the album.

== Track listing ==
All lyrics are written by Akio Inoue; all music is composed by Daisuke Asakura.

No.	Title	Length
1.	"Aoi Hekireki (蒼い霹靂)"	5:01
2.	"Oh! My Girl, Oh My God! -Morning Surprise Mix-"	4:30
3.	"White Breath -More Freeze Mix-"	4:00
4.	"O.L."	5:24
5.	"Mid-Nite Warriors"	5:07
6.	"Level 4 -Level→V Mix-"	3:56
7.	"Slight faith"	5:20
8.	"Mind Escape"	4:34
9.	"Joker -G Code Mix-"	4:51
10.	"Twinkle Million Rendezvous"	5:35
11.	"High Pressure -More Heat Mix-"	4:25
12.	"Just a Joke"	0:55

== Charts ==
Chart performance for Triple joker
Chart (1998)	Peak position
Japanese Albums (Oricon)	1

Year-end chart performance for Triple joker
Chart (1998)	Position
Japanese Albums (Oricon)	13

== Certifications ==
Certifications and sales for triple joker
Region	Certification	Certified units/sales
Japan (RIAJ)	4x Platinum	1,650,000

== Accolades ==
Year	Ceremony	Result	Ref.
1999	13th Japan Gold Disc Award	Nominated	

== Release history ==
Date	Edition(s)	Format(s)	Label	Ref.
January 21, 1998	Standard	Cassette; CD	Antinos Records	
June 1, 2002	Re-issue	CD	Sony Music Entertainment Japan	
June 1, 2016	Standard	Digital download	Sony Music Entertainment Japan	

== Personnel ==
Adapted from liner notes booklet.

- Executive producer: Daisuke Asakura
- Programming and keyboards: Daisuke Asakura
- Guitar: Tetsuya Katsuragi (Tracks 1, 2, 4, 6, 8, 9, 11)
- Guitar: Koichi Korenaga (Tracks 5, 10)
- Guitar: Takaaki Goto (Tracks 3, 7)
- Bass: Eiji Shirasu (Track 8)
- Backing vocals: Daisuke Asakura (Track 2)
- Backing vocals: Kenichi Ito (Track 8)
- Backing vocals: Eiji Shirasu (Tracks 1–11)
- Recording engineers: Shigeki Kashii, Motonari Sasaki, Takashi Ikito
- Mixing engineer: Phil Kuffel
- Mastering engineer: Brian Gardner
- Director: Yuko Abe
