= Tokyo Magnitude 8.0 =

Japanese anime television series

- Key visual of the series
- 東京マグニチュード8.0; Tōkyō Magunichūdo Hachitenzero
- Genre: Disaster
- Written by: Natsuko Takahashi; Kazuya Murata (Note: Credited as 構成.)
- Directed by: Masaki Tachibana
- Voices of: Satomi Hanamura; Yūko Kaida; Yumiko Kobayashi
- Music by: Kow Otani
- Opening theme: "Kimi no Uta" by abingdon boys school
- Ending theme: "M/elody" by Shion Tsuji
- Country of origin: Japan
- Original language: Japanese
- No. of seasons: 1
- No. of episodes: 11

Production
- Producer: Hiroko Yamada; Kazuhiko Yusa; Masahiko Minami; Muneki Ogasawara; Naoki Kitagawa; Yoshio Takada
- Cinematography: Mika Nakajima
- Animators: Bones; Kinema Citrus
- Editor: Kiyoshi Hirose
- Running time: 23 minutes
- Production company: Asmik Ace; BONES; Dentsu; Fuji Television Network; Kinema Citrus; Sony Music Entertainment Japan; Toho

Original release
- Network: FNS (Fuji TV (Noitamina))
- Release: July 9 – September 17, 2009

Tokyo Magnitude 8.0 (Japanese: 東京マグニチュード8.0, Hepburn: Tōkyō Magunichūdo Hachitenzero) is a Japanese anime television series produced by Fuji TV, Asmik Ace, Sony Music Entertainment Japan, Dentsu, Bones, and Kinema Citrus. It first aired on Fuji TV's noitamina timeslot in July 2009, running for 11 episodes until September. The anime was directed by Masaki Tachibana, with Natsuko Takahashi handling series composition, Atsuko Nozaki designing the characters and Kow Otani composing the music. The series centers on two young siblings, Mirai and Yūki, and single mother Mari who the two meet in the aftermath of a major earthquake hitting the Japanese capital, placed in the near future.

In 2009, Tokyo Magnitude 8.0 won the Excellence Award at the 13th Japan Media Arts Festival.

== Plot ==
After a massive earthquake in Tokyo 25 km under the sea at a magnitude of 8.0, two young siblings Mirai and Yūki, who were visiting a robot exhibition in Odaiba at the beginning of their summer vacation, struggle to reach their parents in their house in Setagaya, assisted by a female motorcycle courier named Mari, who is striving to reach her own daughter and mother in Sangenjaya. Together, the three of them brave the partly ruined city and try their best to make it home safely.

== Characters ==
- Mirai Onozawa (小野沢 未来, Onozawa Mirai) is a 7th grader who attends Rika Girls Academy. At the beginning of the series, she is unsure of what she wants to become later in life, but starts to change this outlook after the earthquake. Voiced by: Satomi Hanamura (Japanese); Luci Christian (English)
- Yūki Onozawa (小野沢 悠貴, Onozawa Yūki) is a 3rd grader and enthusiastic about robots. He has a somewhat distant relationship with his sister, and does not like to let others know when he is tired or ill. Voiced by: Yumiko Kobayashi (Japanese); Tiffany Grant (English)
- Mari Kusakabe (日下部 真理, Kusakabe Mari) is a motorcycle courier who assists Mirai and Yūki reach their parents' home after the earthquake happens. They make a promise to reach their home together. Voiced by: Yūko Kaida (Japanese); Shelley Calene-Black (English)
- Seiji Onozawa (小野沢 誠司, Onozawa Seiji), Mirai and Yūki's father, is injured while at work when the earthquake occurs. Voiced by: Hiroshi Naka (Japanese); David Matranga (English)
- Masami Onozawa (小野沢 雅美, Onozawa Masami) is Mirai and Yūki's mother. The earthquake occurs on her birthday. Voiced by: Kikuko Inoue (Japanese); Maggie Flecknoe (English)
- Mayu (まゆ) is one of Mirai's friends from school. She is seen taking care of her younger siblings while her mother is in a nearby hospital. Voiced by: Eri Kitamura (Japanese); Nancy Novotny (English)
- Yuka (ゆか) is Mirai's other friend from school. Because of her laziness she tends to do poorly in her studies. Voiced by: Aki Toyosaki (Japanese); Carli Mosier (English)
- Risa (りさ) another classmate of Mirai's. She comes from a rich family and owns a summer house in Canada that was built by her father. Voiced by: Aya Endō (Japanese); Allison Sumrall (English)
- Itsuki (五木) is Yuki's best friend who is in the same class as him. Before the earthquake, he and Yuki along with their school teacher planted a tree in their school's yard. Voiced by: Miyuki Sawashiro (Japanese); Shannon Emerick (English)
- Hina Kusakabe (日下部 ひな, Kusakabe Hina) is Mari's daughter age 3 to 5 years old. While Hina's mother was out searching for her, she was staying with her grandmother during the earthquake. Voiced by: Megumi Yamaguchi (Japanese); Nancy Novotny (English)
- Kento Nonomiya (野宮 健人, Nonomiya Kento) is a middle school boy who becomes friends with Mirai in episode 7. Just like Yuki he is a big fan of robots. Voiced by: Shinya Hamazoe (Japanese); Greg Ayres (English)
- Aya Kawasaki (川崎 彩, Kawasaki Aya) is Mari's co-worker at Tiger Express Delivery who helps take care of her when she arrives at the office. Voiced by: Ai Nonaka (Japanese); Brittney Karbowski (English)
- Reiko Kusakabe (日下部 礼子, Kusakabe Reiko) is Mari Kusakabe's mother-in-law and the grandmother of Hina Kusakabe. She helps take care of Hina while Mari is at work. Voiced by: Yukiko Mizuochi (Japanese); Susan O. Koozin (English)

== Production and release ==
Title card depicting Tokyo Tower in ruins

The series was first announced at the 2009 Tokyo Anime Fair, denoting that it would replace Eden of the East in Fuji TV's noitamina well-rated anime timeblock and would be co-produced by Bones and Kinema Citrus. It first aired on Fuji TV's noitamina timeslot on July 9, 2009, running for 11 episodes until September 17. The series' setting is based upon the prediction that there is 70% or higher chance of an earthquake measuring 7.0 magnitude on the Richter scale hitting Tokyo in the next 30 years, with the series illustrating the consequences of a magnitude 8.0 earthquake affecting the city. Bones stated that it would try to realistically depict the after-effects of such a situation and that it would collect and tabulate research on previous earthquakes and interview individuals who were affected by them.

The series features the efforts of the Japan Ground Self-Defense Force, Japan Coast Guard, Tokyo Fire Department and Tokyo Disaster Medical Assistance Team in assisting recovery efforts after the initial earthquake and its recurring aftershocks. FNN newscaster Christel Takigawa also features as a guest, reporting on the earthquake and assuming the role of a "navigator" during the series.

=== Music ===
The series uses two pieces of theme music. "Your Song" (キミノウタ, Kimi no Uta) by Abingdon Boys School is used for the opening theme, while "M/elody" by Shion Tsuji is used for the ending.

=== Overseas distribution ===
Tokyo Magnitude 8.0 is licensed in North America by Maiden Japan with an English dub produced by Seraphim Digital. The bilingual Blu-ray and DVD was released through Section23 Films on April 2, 2013.

This anime series was broadcast in Italy on Italian television channel Rai 4 on August 22, 2011, and ended September 5, 2011, for a time ranging from 10.45 am and 11.00 am.

=== Episode list ===
No.	Title	Directed by	Written by	Original release date
1	"Odaiba Sinks"; Transliteration: "Odaiba, shizumu" (Japanese: お台場、沈む)	Fumiya Hōjō	Natsuko Takahashi	July 9, 2009
Mirai Onozawa and her younger brother Yūki visit a robot exposition at Odaiba, Tokyo when a massive earthquake strikes the city.
2	"The World is Broken"; Transliteration: "Kowareru, sekai" (Japanese: 壊れる、世界)	Daisuke Tokutsuchi	Natsuko Takahashi; Yōichi Katō	July 16, 2009
After the earthquake, Mirai desperately looks for Yūki inside a collapsing building along with Mari Kusakabe, a female motorcycle courier who offered to help her.
3	"Burning Bridge"; Transliteration: "Moeru, hashi" (Japanese: 燃える、橋)	Hideki Itō	Natsuko Takahashi	July 23, 2009
Mirai, Yūki and Mari decide to reach their homes together, but just after starting their journey, they find that there are far more dangers in the collapsing city than they imagined.
4	"The Promise Between the Three"; Transliteration: "Sannin no, yakusoku" (Japanese: 三人の、約束)	Yasuhiro Geshi	Natsuko Takahashi; Hiroko Kazui	July 30, 2009
Having finally left Odaiba, the trio finds a place to gather supplies and prepare themselves for their long walk, but after having an argument, Mirai and Yūki stray away from Mari and end up in serious trouble as another aftershock hits.
5	"The School is Wailing"; Transliteration: "Dōkoku no, manabiya" (Japanese: 慟哭の、学び舎)	Daisuke Tokutsuchi	Natsuko Takahashi	August 6, 2009
The group takes shelter on the premises of Mirai's school during the night, but their stay becomes far from peaceful as they are constantly plagued by aftershocks and depressed by the sight of those who lost their relatives to the earthquake.
6	"Choice to Abandon"; Transliteration: "Misuteru, sentaku" (Japanese: 見捨てる、選択)	Nobukage Kimura	Yōichi Katō	August 13, 2009
The group reaches Mari's workplace, where she loses consciousness because of anemia. While tending to her, a stranger enters the building.
7	"Summer's Dusk"; Transliteration: "Natsu no yūgure" (Japanese: 夏の夕暮れ)	Fumiya Hōjō	Hiroko Kazui	August 20, 2009
Rescue robots help recover survivors, fascinating Yūki and leading him to meet a new friend, who shares his interests. However the journey so far seems to have taken its toll on Yūki.
8	"Pure White Morning"; Transliteration: "Masshiro na asa" (Japanese: まっしろな朝)	Shinobu Sasaki; Hajime Yabana	Natsuko Takahashi	August 27, 2009
Yūki collapses suddenly and is taken to the hospital. Mirai and Mari spend a long night waiting for news of his condition.
9	"Farewell, Today"; Transliteration: "Kyō, sayonara" (Japanese: 今日、さよなら)	Hideki Itō	Natsuko Takahashi	September 3, 2009
Mari finally reaches her home to find it destroyed. Upon learning that neighborhood residents were evacuated to a nearby elementary school, the trio heads there to search for Mari's daughter and mother. Afterward, Mirai and Yūki come to a decision about their journey home.
10	"Mirai, You Know..."; Transliteration: "Onee-chan, ano ne..." (Japanese: おねえちゃん、あのね)	Masahiko Watanabe	Natsuko Takahashi	September 10, 2009
Yūki and Mirai catch a ride home and Yūki tries to talk to her about something important. Mirai is reunited with a friend that gives her news about her parents, but has to keep dealing with Yūki running off by himself. Yūki finally finds the words to tell Mirai what she needs to hear.
11	"Dear Yūki..."; Transliteration: "Yūki e..." (Japanese: 悠貴へ...)	Kazuya Nomura	Natsuko Takahashi	September 17, 2009
Mirai is reunited with her parents and Yūki says goodbye. A month later, Mari comes to visit and gives her the backpack she left behind at the hospital, containing two gifts: the one she and Yūki bought for their mother and an unexpected gift from Yūki to Mirai.

== Reception ==
Tokyo Magnitude 8.0 won the Excellence Award in the Animation Division at the 13th Japan Media Arts Festival in 2009.

== See also ==
- 2011 Tōhoku earthquake and tsunami – one of the largest in the history of observations of magnitude 9.0.
