= Restoration Level➝3 =

1997 studio album by Japanese singer, T.M. Revolution

Studio album by T.M. Revolution
- Released: February 21, 1997
- Recorded: 1996-1997
- Genres: J-pop, electronic rock
- Length: 41:03
- Language: Japanese
- Label: Antinos Records
- Producer: Daisuke Asakura

T.M. Revolution chronology
Makes Revolution (1996)	Restoration Level➝3 (1997)	Triple Joker (1998)

Singles from restoration LEVEL→3
- 1. "Heart of Sword 〜Yoake Mae〜" Released: November 11, 1996

Restoration Level➝3 is the second studio album by T.M. Revolution. Released on February 21, 1997, under Antinos Records, it charted at No. 5 on the Oricon charts, selling over 369,440 copies.

== Overview ==
Following the lukewarm release of his debut album, T.M.R. would achieve recognition with the lead single off the album, "Heart of Sword 〜Yoake Mae〜". Released on November 11th, 1996, it served as the third ending theme for the anime series, Ruroni Kenshin. It reached number 16 on Oricon and charted for 46 weeks. The single would later be re-issued on March 25, 2009.

In an interview with "WHAT's IN?" magazine, he talked about the song's success, "I poured my heart and soul into singing it, and I believe that those feelings are definitely conveyed to the listeners."

== Reception ==
A review from CDJournal was positive, complementing T.M.R's vocals and the album's production.

== Track listing ==
All tracks written by Akio Inoue and produced by Daisuke Asakura.

No.	Title	Length
1.	"restoration LEVEL→3"	1:17
2.	"HEART OF SWORD ~Yoake Mae~ ESPECIAL "MATT" Mix"	5:54
3.	"Tomorrow Meets Resistance"	5:02
4.	"DYNAMITE PASSION"	5:38
5.	"Kageri (翳り / Shadow)"	5:38
6.	"Tomedo na sa Sou na Bokura ~BEDLESS NIGHT SLIDER~ (とめどなさそうなボクら)"	2:40
7.	"IMITATION CRIME"	4:34
8.	"SHAKIN' LOVE '97 ~LIVE REVOLUTION~"	6:09
9.	"HEART OF SWORD ~Yoake Mae~ (HEART OF SWORD ～夜明け前～ / Before the Dawn)"

== Charts ==
Weekly charts
Chart (1997)	Peak position
Japanese Albums (Oricon)	5

Year-end charts
Chart (1997)	Position
Japanese Albums (Oricon)	66

== Certifications ==
Region	Certification	Certified units/sales
Japan (RIAJ)	Platinum	250,000

== Release history ==
Date	Edition(s)	Format(s)	Label	Ref.
February 21, 1997	Standard	Cassette; CD	Antinos Records	
June 1, 2002	Re-issue	CD	Sony Music Entertainment Japan	
June 1, 2016	Standard	Digital Download	Sony Music Entertainment Japan	

== Personnel ==
Adapted from Liner notes booklet.

- Executive Producer: Daisuke Asakura
- Musicians: Tetsuya Katsuragi, Hisashi Shibata, Eiji Shirasu
- Recording Engineers: Yasuo Matsumoto, Motonari Sasaki, Masashi Goto
- Mixing Engineer: Yasuo Matsumoto
- Mastering Engineer: Sanichi Tanaka
- Director: Yuko Abe
