= Luis-Mary =

Japanese visual kei post-punk band

- Origin: Japan
- Genres: Post-punk
- Years active: 1989–1993
- Past members: Zyeno; Shien; Haine; Ken

Luis-Mary was a Japanese visual kei post-punk band that was formed in 1989 and broke up in 1993. There were four members.

== Members ==
- Yoshitsugu "Zyeno" Yamashita (山下善次) - Guitar
- Takehisa "Shien" Maruyama (丸山武久) - Bass guitar
- Takanori "Haine" Nishikawa (西川貴教) - Vocals
- Ken Arita (有田賢) - Drums

== Biography ==
Luis-Mary began in 1989 by Zyeno and Shien. Haine and Ken joined later in 1990. On January 23, 1991, they released their first single "Lainy Blue". Luis-Mary disbanded in 1993 and various "Best of" CDs were released subsequently. Takanori Nishikawa became very successful under his solo act, T.M.Revolution, and is currently in the band abingdon boys school, which formed in 2005. Yoshitsugu went on to join the band Nude along with Takehisa Maruyama. Following Nude, Yoshitsugu played in Cuve, then Sonic Smart Suzzy, and The Strawberry Gun-Gun. Takehisa moved on to play in the band Raydio.

== Discography ==
Album	Date
Lainy Blue	June 20, 1991
Damage	July 21, 1991
Sabaku no ame (砂漠の雨)	March 16, 1992
Rush	March 5, 1993
Best Collection	July 21, 1993
Perfect Selection	September 26, 1997
Perfect Selection 2	December 17, 1997
Perfect Selection 3	March 18, 1998

== Singles ==
Title	Date	Tracks
Lainy Blue	January 23, 1991	Lainy Blue; I'm Crying
Rainy Blue	November 21, 1991	Rainy Blue ～Beloved～
Whisper (In Your Eyes)	March 10, 1992	Whisper (In Your Eyes) 硝子細工の仔猫のように
Drive Me Mad	October 21, 1992	Drive Me Mad; Open Your Heart

== Track list ==
Album	Tracks
Lainy Blue	Eins-zwei-drei-vier; New Rose; Crime of Love; Jeanier; Escape; Believe in Mine; L-O-V-E; Lainy Blue
Damage	Inspire Moon ｢-19XX-｣ Misty Misery; Eins-zwei-drei-vier; New Rose ～Beloved～ Rainy Blue; Don't Ask Me Why
砂漠の雨	Go Ahead; Heaven; La La Me; Blind Boy; Liberate the Prisoner 砂漠の雨; Whisper (In Your Eyes); Cry Out for Murder; Conquest-Spider's Wed- Juvenile Dreams -Mju:- All Over
Rush	T:V～Trans・Vision～ Rock'N Roll Over 約束の場所へ; Jack+Knife (Gambler Mix); Junk Food; Rush; Ninetie's Blame～嘆きの種族～ Easy Money; Pride 春夏秋冬; Wild Beast
Best Collection	Eins-zwei-drei-vier; New Rose; La La Me; Rush ～Beloved～(Single Mix); Blind Boy; Drice Me Mad; Juvenile Dreams 約束の場所へ 硝子細工の仔猫のように; Junk Food; Opean Your Hear; Rainy blue Liberate the Prisoner
Perfect Selection	Inspire Moon 「-19XX- Misty Misery; Rainy Blue; Heaven; La La Me 砂漠の雨 -Mju:- Rock'N Roll Over 約束の場所へ; Junk Food; Easy Money 春夏秋冬
Perfect Selection 2	Eins-zwei-drei-vier; New Rose; Crime of Love; Jeanier; Escape; Believe in Mine; L-O-V-E; Rainy Blue; Don't Ask Me Why; Whisper (In Your Eyes); Wild Beast; Rainy Blue (Live Version)
Perfect Selection 3	Rainy Blue (Single Mix) ～Beloved～ (Single Mix); Whisper (In Your Eyes) 硝子細工の仔猫のように; Drive Me Mad; Open Your Heart; Go Ahead (Instrumental); Cry Out for Murder; Conquest -Spider's Wed- All Over (Instrumental); T:V～Trans・Vision～ Jack+Knife; Ninetie'S Blame～嘆きの種族～ Pride
