= Coordinate (T.M.Revolution album) =

Studio album by T.M.Revolution
- Released: March 26, 2003
- Genres: J-pop, synth-pop
- Length: 44:25
- Label: Antinos Records
- Producer: Daisuke Asakura

T.M.Revolution chronology
| B★E★S★T (2002) | Coordinate (2003) | Seventh Heaven (2004) |

Singles from Coordinate
- 1. "Thunderbird" Released: October 7, 1998; 2. "Boarding" Released: February 7, 2001; 3. "Out of Orbit -Triple Zero-" Released: February 20, 2002; 4. "Invoke" Released: October 30, 2002

Coordinate (stylized as coordinate) is the sixth studio album by T.M.Revolution. It was his last album to be released under Antinos Records and the first in the United States under Tofu Records. It peaked at No. 9 on the Oricon charts, selling over 100,380 copies.

== Overview ==
A concept album, based on the anime series Mobile Suit Gundam SEED in which T.M.Revolution provided the voices for the characters Miguel Aiman and Heine Westenfluss. The cover is a closeup of the customized GINN that his Gundam SEED character piloted; the GINN is orange, which is T.M.R's favorite color.

== Singles ==
Four singles were released from the album, "Invoke" would be the first opening theme for the series, peaking at number 2 on Oricon and charting for 16 weeks. It sold over 247,000 copies and reached number 71 on the Year-end singles chart.

== Critical reception ==
Cammila Collar of AllMusic gave the album a positive review, with praise towards its production and T.M.R's vocal performance, stating "The music on Coordinate is unique in comparison to the larger world of dance-pop, very much because of Takanori's steady, throaty vibrato, accented with brief moments of crooning that never stay long enough to get sappy."

== Track listing ==
All lyrics are written by Akio Inoue; all music is composed by Daisuke Asakura.

| No. | Title | Length |
|---|---|---|
| 1. | "Abort//Clear" | 3:24 |
| 2. | "Out of Orbit 〜Triple ZERO〜 (phase shift mix)" | 4:38 |
| 3. | "Invoke (インヴォーク)" | 4:19 |
| 4. | "Meteor (ミーティア)" | 4:11 |
| 5. | "Neo Sphere" | 3:55 |
| 6. | "Brigade" | 6:00 |
| 7. | "Juggling 〜acoustic GTR "turbo" starter〜" | 4:20 |
| 8. | "Tide Moon River" | 2:16 |
| 9. | "Boarding (phase shift armoured version)" | 5:00 |
| 10. | "Invoke -インヴォーク- (TV opening version)" | 1:31 |
| 11. | "Thunderbird (version"in the force")" | 4:51 |

== Charts ==
=== Weekly charts ===
| Chart (2003) | Peak position |
|---|---|
| Japanese Albums (Oricon) | 9 |

=== Year-end charts ===
| Chart (2003) | Position |
|---|---|
| Japanese Albums (Oricon) | 17 |

== Certifications ==
Certifications and sales for coordinate
| Region | Certification | Certified untis/sales |
|---|---|---|
| Japan (RIAJ) | Gold | 100,000 |

== Release history ==
| Region | Date | Format | Label | Ref. |
|---|---|---|---|---|
| Japan | March 26, 2003 | CD | Antinos Records | |
| Taiwan | 2003 | CD | Antinos Records | |
| United States | October 21, 2003 | CD | Tofu Records | |

== Personnel ==
Adapted from liner notes booklet.

- Sound Producer: Daisuke Asakura
- Programming, Keyboards, Sequenced Guitar: Daisuke Asakura
- Guitar: Tetsuya Katsuragi (Tracks 1, 2, 3, 4, 5, 6, 7, 9, 10)
- Guitar: Koichi Korenaga (Track 11)
- Guitar: Takanori Nishikawa (Track 7)
- Backing Vocals: Eiji Shirasu (Track 2, 3, 5, 7, 8, 9, 10, 11)
- Recording Engineers: Daisuke Asakura, Masaki Osato, Shigeki Kashii
- Mixing Engineer: Daisuke Asakura (Track 7)
- Mixing Engineer: Masaki Osato (Track 1, 2, 4, 5, 8, 10)
- Mixing Engineer: Phil Kuffel (Track 3, 6, 11)
- Mastering Engineer: Mitsuyasu Abe
- Director: Tetsuo Inoue
- Director: Takashi Ikuto
