= The Force (T.M.Revolution album) =

Studio album by T.M.Revolution
- Released: March 10, 1999
- Genre: J-pop
- Length: 48:04
- Label: Antinos Records
- Producer: Daisuke Asakura

T.M.Revolution chronology
Triple Joker (1998)	The Force (1999)	Progress (2000)

Singles from The Force
- 1. "Hot Limit" Released: June 24, 1998; 2. "Thunderbird" Released: October 7, 1998; 3. "Burnin' X'mas" Released: October 28, 1998; 4. "Wild Rush" Released: February 3, 1999

The Force (stylized as the force) is the fourth studio album by Japanese singer T.M.Revolution. It was released on March 10, 1999 under Antinos Records.

== Release ==
The Force reached number 2 on Oricon and charted for 10 weeks, selling over 680,960 copies, reaching number 40 on the Year-end charts. It was certified Million by the Recording Industry Association of Japan.

At the end of 1999, Nishikawa announced a hiatus as "T.M.Revolution" and performed under the guise of “the end of genesis T.M.R. evolution turbo type D” alongside his producer, Daisuke Asakura. Their only album, "Suite Season" was released on February 2nd, 2000, alongside three singles.

== Promotion ==
To promote the album, T.M.Revolution embarked on a nationwide tour, and a two day performance at Tokyo Dome, "T.M.R.Live Revolution '99 -The Force-" on March 17 & 18th, 1998.

== Singles ==
Its lead single, "Hot Limit", released on June 24, 1998, charted at number 1 on Oricon and stayed for 13 weeks; it was later used in a Mitsuya Cider commercial. "Hot Limit" has been covered in rhythm video game franchises such as The Idolmaster Cinderella Girls: Starlight Stage, D4DJ, & BanG Dream!. It served as the second ending theme for the anime series ReLIFE.

"Thunderbird", released on October 7th, 1998, peaked at number 3. The song was performed at the 49th NHK Kōhaku Uta Gassen.

"Burnin' X'mas", released on October 28, peaked at number 2, and its final single, "Wild Rush" reached number 3.

== Packaging ==
The album's digipack comes with a double-folded design. It features Nishikawa sitting on a grassy field, while the back shows him wearing all-black clothing. Opening the left side of the double-fold reveals a photo of the two standing back-to-back. A bonus CD was included that featured the music video for "Wild Rush" and a mini-game.

== Reception ==
A review from music website CDJournal was positive, complimenting the album's production and diversity in sound.

== Track listing ==
All lyrics are written by Akio Inoue; all music is composed by Daisuke Asakura.

No.	Title	Length
1.	"Wild Rush (Album mix)"	3:59
2.	"Untouchable Girls (Album mix) (アンタッチャブルGirls)"	4:17
3.	"Thunderbird"	4:53
4.	"Anadori ga Taki Bokura (あなどりがたきボクら)"	2:35
5.	"Hot Limit"	3:39
6.	"Salsa Bazaar"	3:41
7.	"Aqualovers 〜Deep into the night (Album mix)"	4:02
8.	"Totteoki no Ohanashi ~ Shinsetsu Ren'ai Shinkaron (とっておきのおはなし〜新説恋愛進化論)"	5:13
9.	"Dream Drunker"	3:24
10.	"Burnin' X'mas (Album mix)"	4:56
11.	"True Merry Rings"	5:30
12.	"Promised Force"	1:55

== Charts ==
Chart performance for The Force
Chart (1998)	Peak position
Japanese Albums (Oricon)	2

Year-end chart performance for The Force
Chart (1998)	Position
Japanese Albums (Oricon)	40

== Certifications ==
Certifications and sales for The Force
Region	Certification	Certified units/sales
Japan (RIAJ)	4x Platinum	1,650,000

== Release history ==
Date	Edition(s)	Format(s)	Label	Ref.
March 10, 1999	Standard	Cassette; CD	Antinos Records	
June 1, 2002	Re-issue	CD	Sony Music Entertainment Japan	
December 7, 2011	Standard	Digital download	Sony Music Entertainment Japan	

== Personnel ==
Taken from CD Booklet:

- Executive Producer: Daisuke Asakura
- Programming & Keyboards: Daisuke Asakura
- Guitar: Tetsuya Katsuragi (Tracks 1, 2, 4, 5)
- Guitar: Hayato Ohashi (Tracks 6, 7, 8, 10)
- Guitar: Koichi Korenaga (Tracks 3, 11)
- Bass: Eiji Shirasu (Track 8)
- Drums: Kaoru Abe (Track 1)
- Percussion: Daisuke Asakura (Track 9)
- Strings: Chieko Kanahara Strings (Track 11)
- Harmonica: Koichi Matsuda (Track 9)
- Backing Vocals: Eiji Shirasu (Tracks 1–8, 10, 11)
- Backing Vocals: Daisuke Asakura (Tracks 6, 8, 9)
- Backing Vocals: Yuko Kawai (Track 2)
- Recording Engineers: Shigeki Kashii, Hirokazu Akikubo
- Mixing Engineer: Phil Kuffel
- Mastering Engineer: Brian Gardner
- Director: Yuko Abe
