= Takanori Nishikawa =

Japanese musician and actor (born 1970)

- 西川 貴教
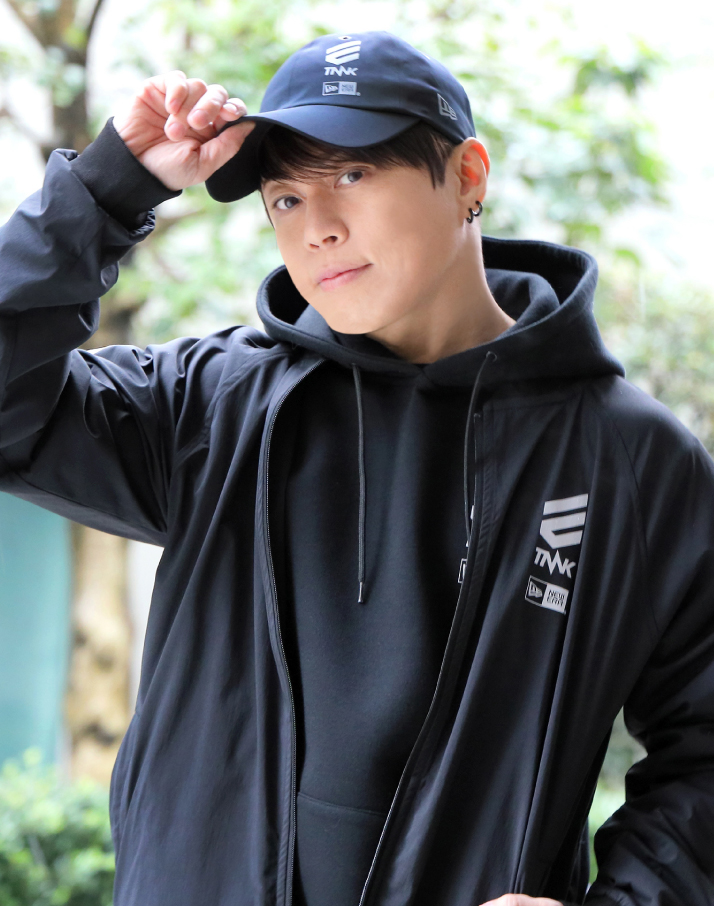
- Nishikawa in 2022
- Born: September 19, 1970 (age 56); Yasu, Shiga, Japan
- Other names: T.M. Revolution; Haine
- Occupations: Musician; singer-songwriter; producer; actor; voice actor; radio personality; businessman
- Spouses: Yumi Yoshimura (m. 1999; div. 2002); Unknown (m. 2020)
- Musical career
- Genres: Electronic rock; synthpop; EDM; dance-rock; industrial rock; alternative rock; post-punk; new wave; disco; J-pop
- Instruments: Vocals; guitar
- Years active: 1989–present
- Labels: Antinos; Epic; Tofu
- Member of: Abingdon Boys School
- Formerly of: Luis-Mary
- Website: www.tm-revolution.com

Takanori Nishikawa (西川 貴教, Nishikawa Takanori; born September 19, 1970) is a Japanese musician, singer, songwriter, record producer, actor, voice actor, radio personality, and businessman. He performs under the stage name T.M.Revolution (T.M.R.), which stands for "Takanori Makes Revolution" (貴教が革命を起こす, Takanori ga kakumei o okosu), stemming from the famous 1980s pop electronic band TM Network. Despite most of his songs being written by Akio Inoue and composed/arranged by Daisuke Asakura (also TMR's former producer), T.M.Revolution is considered Nishikawa's solo project. Nishikawa is also known for contributions of ending and opening themes to many notable anime and game series.

After three years as vocalist of the visual kei rock band Luis-Mary, Nishikawa debuted as TMR with the release of his first solo single "Dokusai (Monopolize)" (独裁 -monopolize-) in May 1996. Later that year, his third single "Heart of Sword (Yoake Mae)" (HEART OF SWORD ～夜明け前～) was used as the third ending song for the anime series Rurouni Kenshin, further expanding his fan base. He also contributed six songs to the Mobile Suit Gundam SEED franchise – three for Gundam SEED and three for Gundam SEED Destiny. Nishikawa has guest starred as a minor character in each of those anime series that featured his songs. In 2010, his single "Save the One, Save the All" was used as the ending theme song for the movie Bleach: Hell Verse. Several of Nishikawa's songs, such as "Crosswise" and "Flags", have been used by Capcom's Sengoku Basara video game series and media franchise.

In 2005, Nishikawa formed the rock band Abingdon Boys School. T.M.Revolution was the first artist to be signed to Tofu Records, a record label (affiliated with Sony Music Japan) promoting Japanese artists in North America. Tofu released three of his studio albums: coordinate (2003), Seventh Heaven (2004), and vertical infinity (2005). Nishikawa made his North American live debut at Otakon, a large anime convention in 2003. He has also performed at Pacific Media Expo in 2004 and at the New York Comic Con in 2008. Nishikawa revisited his 2003 US performance at the Asian culture convention Otakon by performing at Otakon's 20th Anniversary on August 10, 2013.

== Early life ==
Nishikawa was born to a government worker (father, Yasuhiro) and a dental hygienist (mother, Kazuko) in Hikone, Shiga, and moved to Yasu, Shiga. He attended Mikami Elementary School (三上小学校, Mikami Shōgakkō) as a child. Nishikawa was close to his grandfather (a retired policeman), whom he visited every day after school, since his parents were always working. Under the encouragement of his grandfather, Takanori studied kendo until age ten, when his grandfather died due to illness.

Nishikawa also attended Yasu Junior High School (野洲中学校, Yasu Chūgakkō) and Yasu High School (滋賀県立野洲高等学校, Shiga Kenritsu Yasu Kōtō Gakkō). While in junior high, Takanori began to consider a career in music. He dropped out of high school and left Shiga to pursue his dream. Takanori was also married to Yumi Yoshimura of Puffy AmiYumi from 1999 to 2002.

== Career ==
=== Luis-Mary ===
Nishikawa joined the visual kei rock band Luis-Mary in 1990 as the vocalist. His band nickname Haine (灰猫) and his appearance at the time would eventually become the inspiration for Nishikawa's character in Gundam SEED Destiny (Heine Westenfluss). Luis-Mary released three singles; "Rainy Blue", "Whisper(In Your Eyes)" and "Drive Me Mad". The band broke up in 1993.

=== T.M.Revolution ===
In 1995, Daisuke Asakura signed on with Nishikawa under the FunHouse label, now owned by BMG Japan. They released one single, Black or White?, under the name Daisuke Asakura expd. Takanori Nishikawa. This song was rerecorded in 1997 and also rearranged in 2000 as TMR's twelfth single (Black or White? version 3). The original "Black or White?" song also appears as the third track on TMR's first album Makes Revolution (1996). Nishikawa participated in a mini three-band event in November 1995. His fan club, turbo, was established shortly afterwards, in December 1995. In early 1996, Nishikawa made several radio appearances announcing the debut of his solo project. On March 22, 1996, the project was given the name T.M.Revolution, with Asakura named as TMR's producer.

Dokusai -monopolize- was released on May 13, 1996, under the Antinos Records label. It reached #28 on the Oricon charts. Nishikawa's performance on NHK's music variety show Pop Jam (which he would, later in his career, cohost for eleven months) helped boost sales, eventually selling out all first press copies of the single. His second single, Venus (臍淑女 -ヴィーナス-) was released two months later, followed by the release of TMR's first album Makes Revolution another month later.

Heart of Sword: Yoake Mae was released in November 1996 and was used as the third ending song for Rurouni Kenshin. It later replaced "The Fourth Avenue Cafe" (by rock band L'Arc-en-Ciel) as the fourth ending song, due to drug charges laid against a now former member of that band. "Heart of Sword: Yoake Mae" became a fan favourite that sold 360,000 copies and reached #16 on the Oricon charts. Nishikawa's second album, restoration LEVEL➝3 [sometimes called Ishin Level➝3 (維新レベル➝3)] was released in February 1997, which reached #5 on the Oricon charts.

Nishikawa released three singles, Level 4, High Pressure, and White Breath, in 1997. High Pressure became TMR's breakthrough single, selling 800,000 copies. White Breath sold over one million copies and became the first TMR single to reach #1 on the Oricon charts. Nishikawa performed White Breath on the 48th edition of Kōhaku Uta Gassen, an annual music show televised by NHK. Less than a month later, his third album triple joker was released and went on to sell two million copies. Aoi Hekireki (蒼い霹靂, Blue Lightning), the first track from triple joker, was recut as a single in February 1998 and it was used in a Yamaha JOG commercial. Nishikawa's three albums were also released in other parts of Asia, and he visited Taiwan in April 1998 to promote triple joker. Hot Limit, released in June 1998, sold 900,000 copies and became Nishikawa's second #1 single. Nishikawa also performed at the 49th edition of Kōhaku Uta Gassen. His fourth album, the force, was released in March 1999 and featured album mixes of the four singles (Hot Limit, Thunderbird, Burnin' X'mas, Wild Rush) that followed Aoi Hekireki. Shortly after the force was released, Nishikawa performed two concerts at Tokyo Dome to a total audience of 100,000.

In 1999, Nishikawa announced the end of T.M.Revolution. He and Daisuke Asakura went on to form The End of Genesis T.M.R. evolution Turbo Type D (or TMR-e, for short). The name implied it was an "evolution" of TMR. Asakura also appeared in their music videos and performed alongside Nishikawa. Three singles were released under that name, all in 1999: Kagerō (陽炎 -KAGEROH-), Gekkō (月虹 -GEKKOH-), and Setsugen -winter dust- (雪幻 -winter dust-). Their only album, Suite Season, was released in February 2000. Nishikawa and Asakura started becoming more distant from each other, and Nishikawa reverted to his original stage name in April 2000.

BLACK OR WHITE? version 3, a self-cover, was released in April 2000. It was used as a professional baseball theme song on Nippon Television. Two other singles [HEAT CAPACITY and Madan ~Der Freischütz~ (魔弾 ～Der Freischütz～)], a remix album (DISCORdanza: Try My Remix ~Single Collections~), and studio album (progress; TMR's fifth) were also released in 2000.

Boarding was released in February 2001. The title track of the single was used as a theme song to a drama called To Make Divided a House (別れさせ屋, Wakaresase Ya). Nishikawa started self-producing, with the release of his sixteenth single (Out of Orbit ~Triple ZERO~) one year later. (Asakura continued to compose music for TMR.) His compilation album B☆E☆S☆T was released the next month. Epic Records Japan purchased Antinos Records that year, and all albums on the Antinos catalogue were re-released under the Epic label on July 1, 2002. "Thunderbird" inspired anime director Mitsuo Fukuda to ask Nishikawa to perform the first opening song for Gundam SEED ("Invoke"). Invoke, released in September 2002, sold 250,000 copies and reached #2 on the Oricon charts. Nishikawa also voice acted as Miguel Aiman early in that series and narrated a recap episode of Gundam SEED.

Coordinate, his sixth original album, was released in March 2003. The cover was a closeup of the customized orange GINN that Nishikawa's Gundam SEED character piloted. (Orange is Nishikawa's favourite colour.) "Meteor" (Meteor -ミーティア-), an album track from coordinate, was used as an insert song to Gundam SEED. The album mix of "THUNDERBIRD", originally from the force, was also included on this album. Later that year, Nishikawa became the first artist to be signed under Tofu Records, and coordinate was the first album released by Tofu. The Tofu release of coordinate also included "HEART OF SWORD ~Yoake Mae~" as a bonus track. Nishikawa made his debut North American performance at Otakon in August 2003, to a massive audience who filled both the ballroom and overflow room (an exhibition hall) of the Baltimore Convention Center to their entirety.

Nishikawa released his eighteenth single, Albireo (Albireo -アルビレオ-), in February 2004. (Albireo is a bright star from the constellation Cygnus.) "Albireo" was used in a music variety show on Nippon Television called AX MUSIC-TV, where it was #49 on the show's "power play" list. SEVENTH HEAVEN, his aptly named seventh album, was released in March 2004. Tofu Records released SEVENTH HEAVEN a few weeks later and Nishikawa performed at Pacific Media Expo in May 2004. "Zips", a track from SEVENTH HEAVEN, was used as an insert song for the first Mobile Suit Gundam SEED: Special Edition movie. "Wheel of Fortune" was used as a Formula Nippon theme song on Fuji Television.

Nishikawa was asked to sing the ending theme song of the Japanese theatrical release of Spider-Man 2 ("Web of Night"), because of his performance at PMX 2004 and his relations at Sony Music Japan. Web of Night, released in late July 2004, also included a rearrangement of "Tears Macerate Reason" (originally from Seventh Heaven) and an English version of the song (translated by Lynne Hobday). Nishikawa shot the "Web of Night" PV in both languages. He also attended the world premiere of Spider-Man 2 wearing a traditional Japanese kimono. "ignited" (ignited -イグナイテッド-) was used as the first opening song of Gundam SEED Destiny, which premiered in October 2004. The release of the ignited single was the first TMR single to reach #1 on the Oricon charts since 1998, becoming the 900th #1 single in the Oricon chart. It was #53 on the 2004 Oricon Top 100 Singles chart, having sold 161,324 copies. Nishikawa also voice acted as Heine Westenfluss for several episodes of Gundam SEED Destiny. His character was directly modelled after Nishikawa himself, as opposed to Miguel Aiman of SEED. Heine's hairstyle resembled Nishikawa's Luis-Mary hairstyle, and his name was a play on Nishikawa's pseudonym with that band (Haine). [Heine's first name is written as Haine (ハイネ) in katakana.] The surnames of both Nishikawa and Westenfluss mean "west river" in Japanese (西川) and German (Westenfluß), respectively. "Ignited"'s title is closely similar to the mobile suit (GOUF Ignited) that Nishikawa's GSD character piloted.

Vertical infinity was released on January 26, 2005, by Epic and exactly six months later by Tofu Records. The infinity symbol (∞), when facing vertically or turned sideways, looks like the number 8. That is also the number of original studio albums Nishikawa has released to date as T.M.Revolution. vertical infinity included album mixes of "Web of Night" (both Japanese and English versions) and "ignited". It also included two English-language tracks, "Bring It On" (written by Nishikawa) and "Chase / The Thrill" (written by Hobday). "Chase / The Thrill" was used as the Japanese theme song of the X Games. vertical infinity marked a significant change in T.M.Revolution's musical style, as only half of the album was arranged by Daisuke Asakura, while Nishikawa arranged or co-arranged the other tracks.

With preparations for T.M.Revolution's tenth anniversary in May 2006 and other commitments, Nishikawa was unable to visit North America in 2005. In April 2005, he began cohosting NHK's music variety show Pop Jam with NHK Broadcasting Center announcer Yuriko Murakami (村上 由利子) and comedy duo UN JASH (アンジャッシュ, Anjasshu). Nishikawa's twenty-first single, Vestige (vestige -ヴェスティージ-), was released in August 2005. It was his fourth single, and second consecutive, to reach #1 on the Oricon charts. "Vestige" was used as an insert song for Gundam SEED Destiny. "Crosswise", the other track, was used as the theme song for PlayStation 2 game Sengoku BASARA. Vestige was #54 on the 2005 Oricon Top 100 Singles chart, with 176,028 copies sold that year. The Vestige single came with a unique password that was used to vote online (on T.M.Revolution's official website) for which songs would appear on an upcoming self-cover album. These songs would be rearranged and re-recorded. Ten songs were originally planned for this album, but due to the overwhelming number of votes, fifteen tracks were recorded instead. The "self-cover best album", titled UNDER:COVER, was released on January 1, 2006, and was ranked #8 on the Oricon charts. UNDER:COVER came in two editions, limited (or first press) and regular. The regular edition contained fourteen tracks. The limited edition came with fourteen tracks, a bonus track on a separate disc (instrumental version of "Meteor", Daisuke Asakura's only contribution to the album), and a poster which listed the names of all the people who selected the tracks. The rearrangement of "Zips" was used as an insert song to the first Mobile Suit Gundam SEED Destiny: Special Edition movie.

Nishikawa performed the UNDER:COVER mix of "WHITE BREATH" at the 56th edition of Kōhaku Uta Gassen, his third appearance and his first since 1998. His cohosting duties on Pop Jam came to an end in March 2006. His tenth anniversary celebration was held at Universal Studios Japan in Osaka on May 13, 2006. That day, it was announced that Nishikawa will perform at USJ, near Peter Pan's Neverland, on his 36th birthday on September 19, 2006. His second compilation album, 1000000000000 (a one followed by 12 zeroes), was released on June 7, 2006. It was a two disc set that contained the A-sides of all twenty-one singles released to date, and was ranked #1 on the Oricon charts. The corresponding DVD, released three weeks later, contained all twenty-four TMR PVs made. Nishikawa has also starred in a drama called Nursing Étoile in autumn 2006.

=== Abingdon Boys School era ===
Nishikawa established a new band called Abingdon Boys School in 2005. Named after the school where Radiohead met, ex-Wands guitarist Hiroshi Shibasaki joined the band alongside Sunao and Toshiyuki Kishi. Abingdon Boys School scored seven straight top ten hits and released two albums, as well as touring throughout Europe and having their albums, including English language songs, released through a German record label. The band also performed at the Live Earth concert in Tokyo, Japan, on July 7, 2007.

=== Cloud Nine era ===
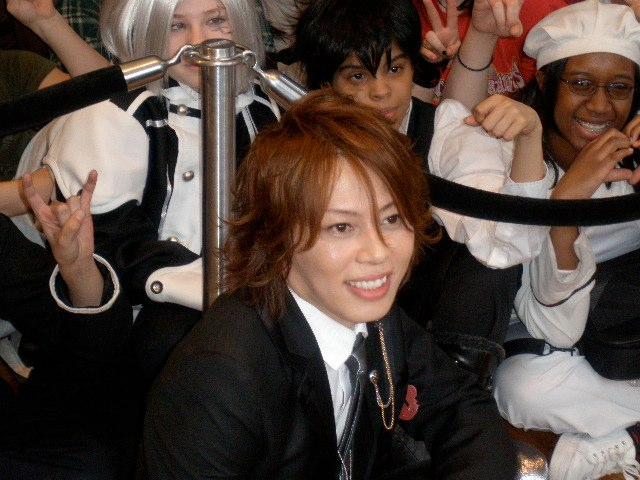
Nishikawa at the Kinokuniya Bookstore, NYC in 2008

Nishikawa held the Real Time Countdown Party Revolution, a live concert he did with all of his fans on New Year's Eve, to make up for the lack of new T.M. Revolution material. Although in a recent magazine interview, Nishikawa has stated that he will make a comeback in 2008 as T.M. Revolution. His first new single, 'Resonance', which features all his past famous hit song music videos and promotes Sony products in its Music Video, is the Anime theme song for the anime Soul Eater and was released on June 11. Resonance reached #4 on Oricon Singles Chart on its release day. "Soul's Crossing", the B-side of the "Resonance" single, was used as the theme song for the Soul Eater video game for the Wii console.

T.M.Revolution took part in the "hide memorial summit", a music festival to honor the tenth anniversary of the death of X Japan guitarist hide.

At the New York Anime Festival 2008, and official TMR and ABS panel hinted at some 'surprise projects' involving Nishikawa. However, no further news on a new album were made. And on March 23, 2009, T.M.Revolution released a Memorial Box featuring the songs from his debut single, Dokusai monopolize through eleventh single, WILD RUSH. These singles were originally released on 8 cm minidiscs but will now be in high-fidelity Blu-spec CD format (fully compatible with standard CD players). The box also contains a bonus DVD from his T.M.R. YEAR COUNTDOWN LIVE, a photo book and logo sticker set. The box's price is 17 800 yen, but the singles are also sold separately.

T.M.Revolution is going to release a single dedicated to a beautiful regional lake. From 2009 the song has been performed during live shows known under the title [Lakers] and for the first time ever, it will be a single only available for download, scheduled for March 3. The song [Lakers] will also be the image song of the 65th Biwako Marathon. The lyrics have been written by Inoue Akio, the music arrangement is made by Asakura Daisuke.

On March 24 T.M.Revolution will release a collaboration work with the Gundam franchise called "T.M.R.×GUNDAM SEED SPECIAL PROJECT [X42S-REVOLUTION]" The CD will contain all the 5 songs he made for the series. 'Invoke', 'Ignited', 'Meteor', 'Zips' and 'Vestige'. But there will be a 6th track on the CD called 'imaginary ark' and this is the 30th Anniversary song for Gunpla. The CD comes in 3 versions.

On August 11, a double A-side single 'Naked Arms/Sword Summit' will be released. Naked arms will be the opening song for the new Sengoku Basara game. An English version of the song will be able on the regular edition of this single. That song will be the opening for the game outside Japan. SWORD SUMMIT is the new opening for the second season of the anime Sengoku Basara.

=== Preserved Roses / Kakumei Dualism era ===
In 2013, Nishikawa teamed up with Nana Mizuki in a collaboration called T.M.Revolution X Nana Mizuki, and they released two singles, Preserved Roses and 革命デュアリズム (Kakumei Dyuarizumu, lit. Revolution Dualism), both recorded as the opening theme songs of Valvrave the Liberator, 1st and 2nd Season respectively.

=== Ten (天) era ===
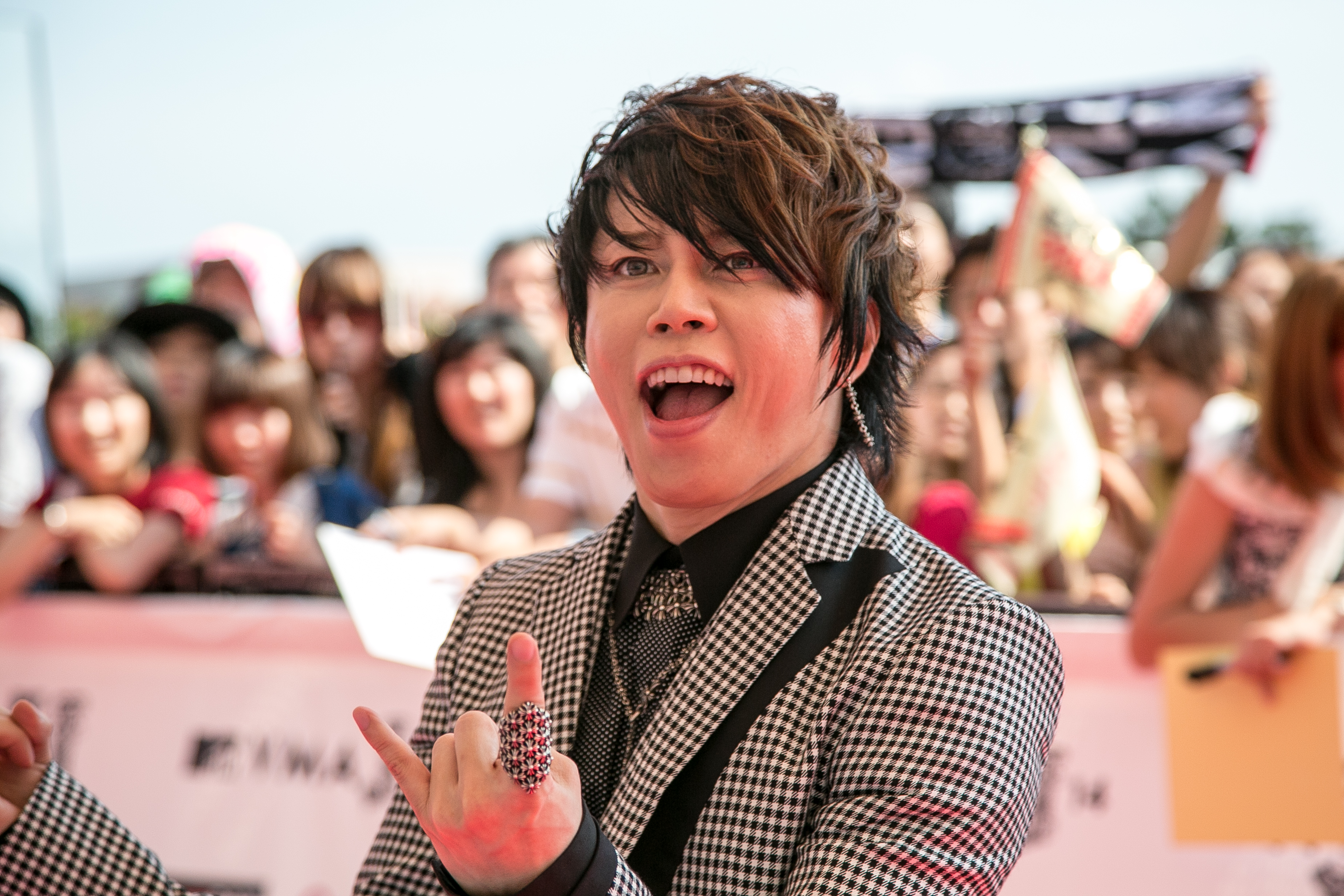
Nishikawa at the MTV Video Music Awards Japan in 2014

Takanori announced his new album Ten (天)(Heaven). His 10th album and first album in four years came on three editions scheduled for release on his 19th anniversary at May 13, 2015.

This album comes about 4 years after his last original album Cloud Nine. It consists of 15 tracks including "Flags", "The party must go on", and "Count Zero", which are all songs he collaborated with Sengoku BASARA, as well as "Summer Blizzard" and "Heaven Only Knows ～Get the Power～", which were only released digitally. It also includes brand new songs such as "Double-Deal" and "Amakaze".

The album comes in two limited editions (A & B) and a regular edition. Limited edition A comes with a DVD featuring live footage of 'Inazuma Rock Fes 2014', while limited edition B DVD contains a digest of 'T.M.R. Live Revolution'14 in Taipei' and an interview.

Afterwards T.M.Revolution held a long tour titled "T.M.R. Live Revolution '15 -Ten-" kicking off on April 4 and 5 at Harmony Zama Hall in Kanagawa.

=== Committed RED / Inherit the Force and 2020 -T.M.Revolution All Time Best- era ===
On April 6, 2016, Nishikawa released the single "Committed RED / Inherit the Force" . The song "Committed RED" was used for the theme song of the PS4 game Sengoku Basara: Sanada Yukimura-Den (Sengoku Basara: The Legend of Sanada Yukimura), while the song "Inherit the force" was used for the theme song of the PS Vita game Kidou Senshi Gundam EXTREME VS-FORCE Nishikawa was also featured in AOA's first Japanese single, "Give Me The Love" during this time. On May 11, 2016, he released the best album "2020 -T.M.Revolution All Time Best-". The album was released to celebrate 20 years of his career. The album contains 3 discs. In Disc 1, it contains all of the singles that released from his first single until his single that released in 2000 (all singles that released before and in 2000). In Disc 2, it contains all of the singles that released from 2001 to 2010. And in Disc 3, it contains all of the singles that released from 2011 until his new singles of that year (2016), "Inherit the Force" and "Committed Red". On the DVD track list, it contains the video "20 Years of Nishikawa in 2020 Seconds", a video that told the story of his career from 20 years before until now.

On August 31, 2016, he released the single "Raimei". The song was used as the opening theme for the live-action puppetry collaboration between Japan and Taiwan, Thunderbolt Fantasy.

=== Takanori Nishikawa - BIRI x BIRI, Bright Burning Shout, Singularity, REALxEYEZ, 天秤-Libra- ===
On September 19, 2017, he released a digital single titled "BIRI x BIRI" collaborating with Shuta Sueyoshi from AAA; the song itself is used as the theme song of the film Overdrive, known in Japan as "Scramble". This single is also marked as a single that uses his real name, instead of using his stage name. In various articles promoting the movie and his contribution to it, he stated that he wished to try more and different styles of music under his own name. On March 7, 2018, he will release a single titled "Bright Burning Shout", which was released digitally on January 28, 2018; the song is used as the opening theme to the 2018 anime Fate/Extra Last Encore.

He covered "Ever Free" for the June 6, 2018 hide tribute album Tribute Impulse. On March 6, 2019, Nishikawa released the album Singularity, which includes "Be Affected", his collaboration with Fear, and Loathing in Las Vegas, the Hiroyuki Sawano-produced tracks "His/Story" and "Roll The Dice" (used as the opening and ending themes respectively for the second season of Thunderbolt Fantasy), and the digital single "Unbroken" feat. Tomoyasu Hotei, which was used as the theme for the film Million Arthur vs. Touken Ranbu the Movie.

In 2019, Nishikawa collaborated with J on the songs "Real×Eyez", the theme song of the Kamen Rider Zero-One TV series, and "Another Daybreak", the theme song of the Kamen Rider Reiwa: The First Generation film. Both tracks were released as a single on January 22, 2020. The two musicians collaborated again on "A.I. ∴ All Imagination" for 2020's Kamen Rider Zero-One the Movie: Real×Time.

Nishikawa collaborated with ASCA in performing the song "Tenbin -LIBRA-" (天秤-Libra-, Balance -LIBRA-) that was released on May 27, 2020; the song is used as the opening theme of anime series White Cat Project: Zero Chronicle. Later that year, he collaborated with Shō Kiryūin in performing a cover of the song "1・2・3" originally sung by Mafumafu and Soraru under the unit After the Rain; the cover was used as the second opening theme of the anime series Pokémon Journeys.

== Other activities ==
=== International market ===
Nishikawa was the guest of honor at Comic Con 2008 in New York.

In early 2008, Nishikawa starred in the movie Corazon de Melon. It premiered at NYU's Cantor Film Center in New York City on September 28, 2008, as part of the film festival.

=== Ambassador for Shiga Prefecture ===
Takanori now has a new title for his resume: first Cultural Ambassador for Shiga prefecture, his home region. At the inauguration ceremony, he said that "I want to return a favor for my hometown by music" and realized his plan. In 2009, he took place a two-day event called "Inazuma Rock Fes" (inazuma means "lightning" associated with a shape of 滋, the first kanji character of Shiga) at a lakeside park in Kusatsu city near his hometown on September 19 (Takanori's birthday) and 20th. It was the first large-scale open-air music festival in history of Shiga. The Inazuma Rock Fes was a big hit, and became an annual event.

=== Record label Defröck Records ===
Takanori has established his own indies record label called Defrock Records. The first artist on the label is the four-member rock band Agitato, who will release a mini-album titled "Colors" on January 20.

Agitato formed in 2004. This past October, they served as the opening act for Nishikawa's band, abingdon boys school, at the Ebisu Liquid Room.

Nishikawa described the label as "borderless", saying that he hopes to deliver a variety of high quality music to the world.

=== Takanori Nishikawa's All Night Nippon ===
"Takanori Nishikawa's All Night Nippon" (西川貴教のオールナイトニッポン, Nishikawa Takanori no Ōru Naito Nippon) was a radio show Nishikawa hosted on All Night Nippon. Listeners, who were unable to meet him at his concerts, had a chance to talk to Nishikawa on air. Nishikawa's radio show was broadcast on Monday nights and ran for eight years and nine months, from January 6, 1997, to September 26, 2005. The show was called "Takanori Nishikawa's All Night Nippon SUPER!" (西川貴教のallnightnippon SUPER!) from April 1999 to March 2003. A two-hour television special with Masaharu Fukuyama, called Masaharu Fukuyama and Takanori Nishikawa's All Night Nippon (福山雅治と西川貴教のオールナイトニッポンTV, Fukuyama Masaharu to Nishikawa Takanori no Ōru Naito Nippon TV), was aired on September 30, 2001, on Fuji Television.

=== Diesel Corporation ===
Established on April 7, 1998, Diesel Corporation is a company run by Nishikawa. The company is responsible for artist management & promotion, operating Nishikawa's fan club, and marketing the DEFRÖCK brand (see next section).

=== Defröck ===
Launched in 2001, Defröck is Nishikawa's clothing line. The name comes from a play on words, most notably the near-phonetic indifference between "l" and "r" in Japanese. Cars, which Nishikawa likes, use a device called differential lock. Nishikawa's favourite music genre is rock (although he does enjoy various kinds of music). He took the first few syllables of "differential", changed "lock" into "rock", and combined the two together to form this name. On a side note, in Gundam SEED, the Defröck label appears on Nishikawa's character's mobile suit as a custom sticker.

=== Babel Fish ===
Babel Fish, which opened in 2004, was a shop (in Shibuya) that sold Defröck clothes. It closed on July 31, 2006.

=== Live Revolution '08–'09 ===
He did a comeback tour as T.M. Revolution from the end of 2008 to March 2009. A photobook, Re:incarnation, has been released, documenting the tour.

== Personal life ==
Nishikawa married fellow musician and singer Yumi Yoshimura on April 2, 1999, but the couple later divorced on July 1, 2002. Though the two remained friends afterwards.

On August 29, 2020, Nishikawa announced via his social media account of his second marriage. His spouse is said to be an ordinary person not in the entertainment industry.

== Discography ==
Nishikawa has released 10 studio albums, 1 pre-debut singles, 30 singles, 15 digital single, 8 compilations, 1 remix album, and 2 "self-cover bests" album as T.M.Revolution. He also recorded a cover of dance group TRF's song "Silver and Gold dance", from their 2006 album Lif-e-Motions.

the end of genesis T.M.Revolution turbo type D released 1 album and 3 singles.

=== As T.M.Revolution ===
- Makes Revolution (1996)
- Restoration Level➝3 (1997)
- Triple Joker (1998)
- The Force (1999)
- Progress (2000)
- Coordinate (2003)
- Seventh Heaven (2004)
- Vertical Infinity (2005)
- Cloud Nine (2011)
- Ten (2015)

=== As Takanori Nishikawa ===
- SINGularity (March 6, 2019)
- SINGularity II - Hyperpaslia protoCOL - (August 10, 2022)
- SINGularity III - VOYAGE - (February 26, 2025)

== Filmography ==
=== Anime ===
- Rurouni Kenshin (1996) – Orochi no Ren (大蛇の煉)
- Mobile Suit Gundam SEED (2002/2003) – Miguel Aiman / narrator (phase-26)
- Mobile Suit Gundam SEED Destiny (2005) – Heine Westenfluss
- Soul Eater opening theme 1 song, Resonance (2009)
- Marvel Disk Wars: The Avengers (2014) – Opening theme song, Tsuki Yabureru - Time to SMASH!, Kenuichio Harada / Silver Samurai (voice)
- Sengoku Basara: End of Judgement (2014) – Sakai Tadatsugu
- ReLIFE episode 2 closing song, Hot Limit (2016)
- B-Project: Kodō＊Ambitious - Nishiyama/series producer (2016)
- White Cat Project opening song featuring Asuka Ōkura also called ASCA, Tenbin -LIBRA- (2020)
- Edens Zero opening song, Eden through the rough (2021)
- Pop Team Epic Series 2 Episode 12 - General Nishikawa (2022)
- Edens Zero opening theme 2 song, Never say Never (2023)
- Fire Force season 3 opening theme 2 song, Ignis -イグニス- (2026)

=== Puppetry ===
- Thunderbolt Fantasy: The Sword of Life and Death - Làng Wū Yáo (Rōfu Yō) / Xián Gē Duàn Xié (Genka Danja) 2017
- Thunderbolt Fantasy: Sword Travels in the East2 - Làng Wū Yáo (Rōfu Yō) / Xián Gē Duàn Xié (Genka Danja) 2018
- Thunderbolt Fantasy: Sword Seekers 3 - Làng Wū Yáo (Rōfu Yō) / Xián Gē Duàn Xié (Genka Danja) 2021
- Thunderbolt Fantasy: Sword Sword Travels in the East 4 - Làng Wū Yáo (Rōfu Yō) / Xián Gē Duàn Xié (Genka Danja) 2024

=== Video games ===
- Shin SD Gundam Force Tensei Knight Saga (2014/2015) - Knight Gundam / Versal Knight Gundam / Superior Dragon, Musha Godmaru
- White Cat Project (2020)
- Genshin Impact (2021) - Arataki Itto

=== Drama ===
- Beautiful Life (2000) - Satoru Kawamura
- Nursing Étoile (2006) - Takeo Baba
- Okusama wa 18-sai (2011) - Tatsuya Takagi
- Scarlet (2019) - George Fujikawa

=== Film ===
- Corazon de Melon (2008)
- Galaxy Turnpike (2015)
- Godai - The Wunderkind (2020) - Iwasaki Yatarō

=== Theatre ===
- Little Shop of Horrors (1999) – Seymour Krelborn (Japanese production)

== Awards ==
Year	Ceremony	Award	Nominated Work
1999	13th Japan Gold Disc Award	Rock Album of The Year	"triple joker"
2000	Space Shower Music Awards	Best Male Video	"Madan 〜Der Freischütz〜"

== Other media appearances ==
=== TV ===
- Kōhaku Uta Gassen (1997/1998/2005/2013/2014)
- Masaharu Fukuyama and Takanori Nishikawa's All Night Nippon (2001)
- Pop Jam (2005/2006)
- Shin Domoto Kyoudai (2011~)
- Who is Princess? (2021)

=== Radio ===
- Liquid ROOM (January 17, 1996 / March 22, 1996)
- ON Air West (February 18, 1996)
- T.M.Radio Wave (April 5, 1996)
- Love Revolution (April 7, 1996)
- JRA Power Revolution (October 3, 1996)
- Takanori Nishikawa's All Night Nippon (1997–2005)(2010)

=== Podcasts ===
- Geeknights with Rym and Scott (April 4, 2008)

== Products ==
=== Photobooks ===
- Starman from Miracle Wonder Planet (1997)
- T.M.R. Live Revolution '97 -Joker- Documentary Tour Book (1997–98)
- T.M.Revolution Perfect Bible Volume 3 (1998)
- Takanori Nishikawa B-Pass Special Edition Perfect Bible Volume 4 (1998)
- T.M.R. Live Revolution '98 Joker Type 2 -Great Fighter- (1998)
- the end of genesis T.M.R.evolution turbo type D (1999)
- Seventh Heaven (2004)
- Ray of Light – Defrock (2005)
- Under:Cover (2006)
- Re:Incarnation (2009)
- Inazuma Rock Fes. 2009 Document Photo Book (2009)
- Inazuma Rock Fes. 2010 Document Photo Book (2010)
- Inazuma Rock Fes. 2011 Document Photo Book (2011)
- Inazuma Rock Fes. 2012 Document Photo Book (2012)
- Inazuma Rock Fes. 2013 Document Photo Book (2013)

=== Hello Kitty keychains ===
Five Hello Kitty keychains were released as promotional items for TMR's tenth anniversary in 2005. They are based on the costume used in the respective song's PV.

1. ignited
2. Wild Rush
3. Black Or White? version 3
4. Hot Limit
5. Burnin' X'mas

== See also ==
- TM Network
- abingdon boys school
- Tofu Records
