= Mariela Ortiz =

American voice actress (born 1976)

Mariela Ortiz (born August 5, 1976) is an American voice actress. She's also an accomplished stage performer who has appeared in productions in both Texas and New York, including The Chico de Jazzz Show written by William M. Hoffman.

== Filmography ==
=== Anime ===
- A Certain Scientific Railgun S - Shinobu Nunotobata
- Angelic Layer - Ringo Seto
- Aquarian Age: Sign for Evolution - Kanae Morito
- Azumanga Daioh - Yuka (Ep. 12)
- Clannad - Harada
- Comic Party Revolution - Konomi
- D.N.Angel - Yuki Suzaki
- Diamond Daydreams - Jun
- Godannar - Konami Sasagure
- Guyver: The Bioboosted Armor - Mizusawa
- High School DxD - Mittelt
- Last Exile: Fam, the Silver Wing - Alister Algrew
- Moeyo Ken - Byakko
- Madlax - Anne Morley
- Nerima Daikon Brothers - Nurglies
- Pani Poni Dash! - Chika Sato (Ep. 5), Giant Salamander
- Princess Jellyfish - Banba
- Sakura Diaries - Urara Kasuga
- Science Ninja Team Gatchaman - Little Boy (Ep. 32), Yamori (Ep. 64), Additional Voices (ADV Dub)
- Selector Infected WIXOSS - Eldora
- Sister Princess - Aria
- UFO Ultramaiden Valkyrie - Midori
- Unbreakable Machine-Doll – Avril
- Xenosaga: The Animation - 100-Series Observational Relian Units
- Yurikuma Arashi - Katyusha Akae
