= List of Last Exile characters =

Gonzo promotional image for Last Exile featuring main characters Lavie Head, Alvis E. Hamilton, and Claus Valca.

The Japanese animated television series Last Exile has a cast of characters designed by artist Range Murata.

All names are displayed according to their spelling in the English subtitled version of the series, as released by Funimation Entertainment or in the romanization of the Japanese names as they appear on official merchandise published after the English localization of the series.

== Creation and conception ==
Concept design for Tatiana Wisla, a supporting character serving as a vanship pilot on the battleship Silvana, wearing a modern flight suit.

The initial concept designs for Last Exile were created by character designer Range Murata. Murata also spent a great amount of time on costume design. Wanting to portray each character's personality more fully, he "tried to draw in the kind of material that would have been used in creating their clothes and try to represent the stitches connecting the fabric". Although Gonzo initially intended for Last Exile to be shown in a space setting, it did not want characters who use sterile space suits. As a result, Murata's designs placed the show in its current setting.

Although the fictional world of Prester is not a representation of Earth; it features technology reminiscent of nineteenth century Europe at the dawn of the Industrial Revolution. Many of its designs were also inspired by Germany's technological advances during the interwar period. Uniform designs for Anatoray's musketeers were based on Napoleon Bonaparte's army and American Civil War soldiers. On the other hand, Soviet Red Army fur coats provided the basis for Disith uniforms. The crew of the Silvana wore uniforms that were more modern and utilitarian. Production of Last Exile relied heavily on 3D computer animation. The animation for Last Exile was also supplemented with Victorian era flourishes. In order to combine hand-drawn animation with computer-generated ones, the production team used a technique for non-photorealistic rendering, which could not be used for Blue Submarine No. 6 (a previous work of Gonzo and one of the first CG anime series) because of a stylistic conflict. At the 2003 Anime Expo, production designer Mahiro Maeda, who also worked with Studio Ghibli's production of Laputa: Castle in the Sky, commented that "[Last Exile] is very advanced in how it will incorporate the two mediums".

== Last Exile ==
=== Protagonists ===
The story of Last Exile revolves Claus Valca and Lavie Head, who fly their vanship as sky couriers. Although they usually take up missions of relatively low difficulty, they are one day asked to complete the mission of dying courier Ralph Wednesday. The mission, rated seven stars out of ten, is to deliver a young girl named Alvis E. Hamilton to the mysterious battleship Silvana. Despite their fears, Claus and Lavie deliver Alvis to the battleship but decide to remain aboard to keep her safe. It is later revealed that Alvis holds the key to uniting the two warring nations of Anatoray and Disith.

==== Claus Valca ====
Voiced by: Mayumi Asano (Japanese); Johnny Yong Bosch (Last Exile), Micah Solusod (Fam, the Silver Wing) (English)

Claus Valca (クラウス・ヴァルカ, Kurausu Varuka) is a fifteen-year-old pilot employed by the Norkia Vanship Union, a sky courier service for the nation of Anatoray. Claus is known for his signature flight technique, the Immelmann turn, and possesses a flight record "not even an adult could outdo".

Claus is no stranger to the vanship courier lifestyle, having been born into and raised for the lifestyle by his late father Hamilcar Valca (much like navigator Georges Head raised daughter Lavie). Their fathers died while attempting to cross the "Grand Stream" on a mission that would have brought peace to Prester. (Note: The two were delivering a message that would have ended a long-standing feud, had it arrived.) After this and his mother's death, Claus followed in his father's footsteps throughout his childhood and early adolescence to become a top-notch pilot. (Note: It is mentioned by several characters (Lavie, "Hurricane Hawk", several unnamed couriers in the first episode, etc.) that Claus is at least equal to his father in piloting ability, who is in turn referred to as an experienced and talented pilot.)

While transporting their special "cargo", Alvis Hamilton, Claus and Lavie's vanship is damaged and they are forced to stay on board the Silvana. The captain of the ship, Alex Row, had been the young pilot who delivered news of his father's death to his family. On top of that, he caught the eye of Dio Eraclea, who was fascinated with his skills as a vanship pilot. Though uncomfortable in his presence, Claus treats Dio as a friend.

==== Lavie Head ====
Voiced by: Chiwa Saitō (Japanese); Kari Wahlgren (Last Exile), Luci Christian (Fam, the Silver Wing) (English)

Lavie Head (ラヴィ・ヘッド, Ravi Heddo) is Claus Valca's navigator and vanship mechanic. The moody, outspoken redhead is proud of her lineage as seen in her protectiveness of her vanship (thought to have belonged to their fathers).

Unlike Claus, she is relatively reluctant to stay on the Silvana and favors the freedom of the vanship lifestyle. She abhors the use of vanships for military purposes, and deplores Claus's interest in becoming a combat pilot. Along with her friendly nature, she can hold grudges with others. Her feelings for Claus are obviously conflicted. She treats Claus mostly like a dear friend and sibling, sometimes acts the part of nagging but caring wife, insofar as she cooks for him and rustles him out of bed. She seems to have repressed romantic feelings for Claus, judging by the somewhat simmering jealously she feels when Tatiana Wisla starts showing an interest in Claus. This most prominently appears when Claus and Tatiana return to the Silvana with Tatiana wearing Claus's pilot suit.

As the events of the series unfold, the emphasis of the story began to shift away from her and Claus, instead focusing on the plights of the two countries in Prester, and the treachery of the Guild. However, she and Claus bore witness to Alvis' release of "Exile," and in the end, chose to settle in the new world.

==== Alvis E. Hamilton ====
Voiced by: Anna Shiraki (Last Exile) and Kana Hanazawa (Fam, The Silver Wing) (Japanese); Michelle Ruff (Last Exile), Tia Ballard (Fam, the Silver Wing) (English)

Alvis E. Hamilton (アルヴィス・E・ハミルトン, Aruvisu E. Hamiruton) is a peculiar eleven-year-old child and "the cargo." Alvis (or "Al") is targeted by the Guild and it becomes apparent that she is the "key to Exile." Her nurse, Guita, and the pilot who was commissioned to transport her, Ralph Wednesday, were killed as a result of the Guild's pursuit. Claus Valca tended to Ralph when he crash landed and that's how they met Al. Ralph knew he was going to die and asked Claus to take his dangerous mission in delivering Al to the Silvana. While Ralph distracted the Guild pilot with his engine, Claus and Lavie drifted downstream with their vanship and Ralph self detonates his ship to save the three of them.

When Al woke up, she was confused and scared of Claus and Lavie Head because she was unconscious during the whole ordeal. She wanted to know whatever happened to her previous guardians, but Claus and Lavie made up an excuse that they were simply away. Al's intuition was enough for her to figure out they are dead. During the night while Claus planned their route, the Guild already caught up to their house and had to make an early run before morning. They did not run far before the Guild fighter caught up to them. At the last moment Alex used a pistol to kill the pilot and recovered their "cargo." Al was knocked out during the Guild fighter assault. After she came to, she woke up again to new strangers (Silvana crew). Claus during that time didn't like Alex's facial expression and worries the safety of Al. He steals highly purified fuel from what's left of the Guild fighter and flew to the Silvana to find Al.

After everyone was reunited, Claus remained with the Silvana crew to look after Lavie and protect Al. Al does not know of her importance, but learns of it while under the care of the Silvana. Al is revealed to be member of the Guild House of Hamilton which has the ability to control Exile and unlocking it by knowing the answers to the questions that form the four Mysteria (see below). The Guild's Maestro Delphine Eraclea kidnapped Al and Claus to discover the secrets of Exile. She needed to recite all four passages, but Alex was smart enough to not know of the fourth and final one should he ever get captured and interrogated.

After Lucciola helped Al and Claus escape from the Guild, Al ended up back in Norkia with Claus. They ventured back into the Grand Stream to use the vanship Lavie worked so hard on to adapt to Grand Stream conditions. After they entered the domain, Al and Claus got to the other side of the Grand Stream, she finished reciting the poem that would unlock Exile's true form.

At the end of the series, Claus and Alvis recite the four Mysteria, allowing Exile to shed its defensive cocoon and reveal itself. The Mysteria, in their correct order of recitation, and their responses are:

1. "What lies in the furthest reaches of the sky?" "That which will guide the lost child back to her mother's arms: Exile."
2. "The waves that dye the land gold." "The blessed breath which nurtures life: a land of wheat."
3. "The path the angels descend upon." "The path of great winds: the Grand Stream."
4. "What lies in the furthest depths of memory?" "The place where all are born and where all will return: a blue star." (Note: Although it is never stated that the blue world is indeed Earth, an image of a planet whose landscape resembles that of Earth is shown when Alvis speaks the phrase "a blue star".)

=== Supporting characters ===
The majority of the events in Last Exile occurred on the fictional lone aerial battleship and aircraft carrier Silvana (シルヴァーナ, Shiruvāna). The ship is known as the "Kill-'em-all" Silvana for its reputation of destroying other battleships regardless of which faction they belong to. Because it has never lost in a battle, the ship became an object of superstition and rumor. Despite being powered by a Claudia unit of Guild origin, the Silvana cannot be controlled by the Guild because the unit itself was stolen. The ship also employs armaments that differ from battleships used by the Anatoray navy. They were developed in secrecy and use a propellant fluid system rather a steam-based one.

The nation of Anatoray (アナトレー, Anatorē) is at risk of experiencing drought. The nation of Disith (デュシス, Dushisu), on the other hand, is experiencing a deep freeze. Anatoray Prime Minister Marius Bassianus likened Disith to a "wounded lion" after its lands fell into a deep freeze due to climate changes.

==== Alexander Row ====
Voiced by: Toshiyuki Morikawa (Japanese); Crispin Freeman (Last Exile), Mike McFarland (Fam, the Silver Wing) (English)

Twenty-eight-year-old Alexander Row, (Note: Although not mentioned during the series, the full names of some characters appear in promotion material such as "Aerial Log" published by Gonzo ISBN 4-8443-5783-2 or in Range Murata's "Range Murata Anime Works 1998–2006 Prismtone" ISBN 4862690939 published by Wani Magazine.) or most commonly known as Alex Row (アレックス・ロウ, Arekkusu Rō), acts as the captain of the Silvana. In the series, he is portrayed as emotionally distant from the other characters, including his first officer, who resembles his deceased fiancée Euris Bassianus (ユーリス・バシアヌス, Yūrisu Bashianusu). Alex's actions are driven by one purpose: to kill Guild Maestro Delphine Eraclea, whom he holds responsible for his fiancée's death. After being confronted about his past, Alex reveals himself to be a friend of the legendary vanship duo of Hamilcar Valca and Georges Head and the former owner of Claus's and Lavie's vanship. Character designer Range Murata has described the character as a "loner". Alex Row was based on Captain Harlock, a space pirate character created by manga artist Leiji Matsumoto. According to Murata, the design for his clothing "turned out all black, no matter how carefully or subtly I put in the lines; they were all the same when I colored it in". Animators also experienced difficulties in animating his hair and flowing cape.

==== Sophia Forrester ====
Voiced by: Wakana Yamazaki (Japanese); Julie Ann Taylor (Last Exile), Anastasia Muñoz (Fam, the Silver Wing) (English)

Sophia Forrester (ソフィア・フォレスター, Sofia Foresutā) is the Silvana's nineteen-year-old first officer and holds the title of Vice-Captain. Another graduate of the Anatoray Officer's Academy along with Vincent Alzey, she is one of the few people Alex Row trusts and is often seen left in command of the ship when the Captain is out in pursuit of his own agenda. Sophia was assigned to be an onboard spy to reveal everything to the emperor, but Sophia fell in love with Alex and never revealed anything compromising about Alex. During the series, it is revealed that Sophia is actually the daughter of the Anatoray emperor and the princess of Anatoray, which comes as a surprise to Claus and others. But all of the feelings of unrest about Sophia's true identity comes to rest when they see that deep inside she is still their executive officer, and loyal to both the Silvanna and Alex. Her feelings for Alex sometimes reveal too much, much to Row's chagrin in his sometimes snarky comments to her.

Marius tells her to love "all [her] subjects, not just one man".

At times in the series, she feels that she is unloved, both by Row's visible actions to her and her father's response to her when she returns to the capital city. On her final night on the Silvana, she put her hair down. Since this gave her an even stronger resemblance to Euris, Alex's dead fiancée, Alex wasn't pleased at all with her appearance and told her off, calling her free flowing hair unbecoming of an officer. Feeling down she went outside to look at the skies when Claus Valca happened to be there and they had a heartful conversation. Sophia felt better after talking to Claus and even gave him his first kiss on the lips. With the death of her father, she becomes empress of Anatoray and sought the alliance of Disith against the Guild, having realized that the Guild was playing both countries against each other. She became the captain of the Silvana after Alex's capture, having ordered the ship to attack the Guild's flagship, with Alex and Maestro Delphine Eraclea on board.

==== Tatiana Wisla ====
Voiced by: Eri Kitamura (Japanese); Michelle Ruff (Last Exile), Clarine Harp (Fam, the Silver Wing) (English)

Tatiana Wisla (タチアナ・ヴィスラ, Tachiana Visura) is the only child of "the proud and noble" Wisla house of Anatoray. At the age of seventeen, Tatiana left home to become a member of the newly formed Anatoray Military Vanship Corps, a new military division dedicated to using vanships as weapons as opposed to just couriers and transports. She excelled in both piloting and dogfighting, quickly becoming one of the best vanship pilots in the sky, possibly second only to Alex Row. She sent all the extra money she made as an ace pilot back to her family so that her mother could care for her ailing father. Before too long, she found herself on the Silvana as Row's handpicked wing commander for his small vanship fighter fleet. She pilots a twin-engine vanship fighter which she painted red to distinguish herself from the other pilots as well as all other vanships in the sky.

With her trusted friend, confidant, and navigator, Alister Agrew, she quickly becomes one of the most dreaded forces in the sky next to the Silvana herself, for which the technicians on board the Silvana start calling her the "princess." Her cold demeanor manages to alienate even her close friend Alister. This leads to Alister flying with Claus Valca as his "navi" (short for "navigator") for a time, both as a rebuke to Tatiana and because Claus's navigator, Lavie Head, does not want to fly any more combat missions.

Tatiana is second best to none in her own mind, but her overconfident self-view is challenged when she meets Claus, whose piloting skills rival her own. From then on, her feelings toward Claus go on a roller coaster, making her feel anger, disgust, awe, respect, fear, and even attraction to the young vanship pilot. Her frosty aloofness is clearly a self-defensive façade; she suffers a mental breakdown of sorts after getting shot down over the desert, but recovers, and from that time she begins to show a greater depth of feeling, especially towards Claus, whom she develops a crush on.

In Last Exile: Fam, the Silver Wing, Tatiana is now Captain of the Submersible Aircraft Carrier Silvius with Alister as her Vice-Captain.

==== Alister Agrew ====
Voiced by: Natsuko Kuwatani (Japanese); Philece Sampler (Last Exile), Mariela Ortiz (Fam, the Silver Wing) (English)

Alister Agrew (アリスティア・アグリュー, Arisutia Aguryū), or "Alis" to her friends, is Tatiana Wisla's trusted confidant, best friend of the same age, and expert navigator. By her nature she is very quiet, reserved, and otherwise unflappable, reacting very little to even the strangest of circumstances. Her only reactions are shown in the way she carries herself, and the quickest way to earn her loyalty is to not dismiss her, or act like she is not around. From her behavior, it is shown that she is a consummate professional, just like Tatiana, which explains why they work so well together. However, she is far more than that, but will do nothing to prove it outright. She has displayed unfathomable respect for Tatiana, a strange attraction to Claus Valca, and even motherly behavior towards Alvis Hamilton.

Alister returns in Last Exile: Fam, the Silver Wing serving as Tatiana's Second-in-Command in the Submersible Aircraft Carrier Silvius.

==== Mullin Shetland ====
Voiced by: Shin-ichiro Miki (Japanese); Dave Wittenberg (English)

Mullin Shetland (モラン・シェトランド, Moran Shetorando) is a nineteen-year-old rifleman on the battleship Claihm Solais, which is the flagship of the Anatoray fleet. He has fought in nineteen battles and needs only one more survivor medal (received from surviving a battle) to become promoted out of the rifleman line. A third of the way through the series he joins the Silvana and becomes a mechanic servicing the vanships. He has a brief crush on the vanship captain Tatiana Wisla but soon forgets about it realizing the futility of it as he moves on to other things. Around the end he leaves the Silvana to train again as a rifleman in a secret joint operation to take back the battleships' Claudia engines and free the world of the Guild.

At this time he meets Dunya Scheer from the Disith fleet, also involved in the operation. He and Dunya fall in love with each other, culminating in Mullin asking Dunya to go on the same ship together. Dunya accepts his request, as the operation to take back the ship's Claudia unit begins. The operation ends with Mullin taking the unit back, but being gravely wounded in the process, believed dead. The epilogue reveals he survived and is living with Dunya on a farm with her siblings.

==== Vincent Alzey ====
Voiced by: Hozumi Gōda (Japanese); Steven Blum (Last Exile), Brandon Potter (Fam, the Silver Wing) (English)

Vincent Alzey (ヴィンセント・アルツアイ, Vinsento Arutsuai) is a naval officer of Anatoray and a friend of Alex Row and Sophia Forrester. Initially appointed Admiral of Anatoray's fleet, he was relieved of his command after Alex sank four out of five of his Urbanus ships. Despite this, he respects Alex, knowing his strengths in combat and strategy (they were in the Officers' Academy together and the same age; indeed, before the battle, Vincent met Alex to try to persuade him to keep the Silvana out of battles). A great lover of coffee, Vincent likes to enjoy life. But when duty calls, he's not about to sit back either. When Sophia was imprisoned by her father and about to be killed by a guard, he barges into her room and saves her. Some of his dialogue also hints at a romantic interest in Sophia, despite her obvious affections for Alex. With her command as Empress, Vincent resumed his command as Admiral, this time leading his ships into a grand battle together with Disith against the Guild.

Vincent returns in Last Exile: Fam, the Silver Wing serving as Commander-in-Chief of the Vanguard Unit of the United Kingdom of Anatoray-Disith.

==== Dunya Scheer ====
Voiced by: Yumi Sudō (Japanese); Kate Higgins (English)

Dunya Scheer (ドゥーニャ・シェーア, Dūnya Shēa) was first introduced in episode 13 (Isolated Pawn) as a seventeen-year-old woman soldier in the army of Disith. She appeared for the first time as one of the members of a small Disith patrol that captured Tatiana Wisla and Claus Valca while they were trying to reach into one of Silvana emergency resorts. However, the patrol is abandoned when migration ships from Disith arrive nearby. When Dunya reaches the landing field, she realizes no civilian ships survived the launch. She sets off her gun while crying in grief.

She is later involved as part of the ground force in the Disith operation to raze the Anatoray capital which is successfully completed. We next see her involved in the same operation Mullin Shetland is involved in; they first meet when she falls over Mullin trying to catch a dove to eat. Over the course of their training, they meet several times and eventually develop a relationship.

The relationship between her and Mullin culminates in Mullin asking Dunya if she would join him on the Silvana. Dunya accepts with the approval of other Disith soldiers and Mullin is overjoyed. The operation commenced shortly thereafter and was successful, though Mullin was gravely wounded and presumed dead. Dunya is seen crying over him. No more reference is made to either of them until the last episode where she is seen getting the message Lavie Head and Claus's fathers were supposed to have delivered over their new grave. She is then seen in the new world with the others.

=== Crew of the Silvana ===
==== Godwin Austin ====
Voiced by: Unshō Ishizuka (Japanese); Beau Billingslea (English)

Godwin Austin (ゴドウィン・オースティン, Godōin Ōsutin) is the thirty-six-year-old mechanic of the Silvana flight deck crew. He is the largest and most aggressive member of the flight deck crew, and usually the first to throw a punch in any fight on anyone who insult the Silvana. Despite this, he has a hidden sensitive side.

==== Gale Frank ====
Voiced by: Kiyoyuki Yanada (Japanese); Michael McConnohie (English)

Gale Frank (ゲイル・フランク, Geiru Furanku) is a twenty-seven-year-old bald mechanic. Notable for wearing metal ear-cuffs that make his ears look pointed, Gale is openly gay and has a crush on Claus.

==== Anthony Kostabi ====
Voiced by: Naoki Makijima (Japanese); Kirk Thornton (English)

Anthony Kostabi (アンソニー・コスタビ, Ansonī Kosutabi) is a twenty-two-year-old mechanic with glasses. Mostly known as Kostabi, he is a cool and calculating type, who is probably more sinister than he looks.

==== Ethan Pelerin ====
Voiced by: Tomokazu Seki (Japanese); Tony Oliver (English)

Ethan Pelerin (イーサン・ペルラン, Īsan Perurin) is a nineteen-year-old mechanic. As the "new guy", he is responsible for many hard chores on the Silvana until Mullin arrived.

==== Arthur Campbell ====
Voiced by: Shigeyori Sōya (Japanese); Paul St. Peter (English)

Arthur Campbell (アーサー・キャンベル, Āsā Kyanberu) is the second officer of the Silvana. Although he shows unswerving loyalty towards both his superiors, Alex Row and Sophia Forrester, he also does not follow them blindly. When Alex orders the Silvana to attack Delphine's ship at Sophia's coronation ceremony, Campbell refuses to obey on grounds that it will risk endangering the Empress and other military commanders below.

==== Wina Lightning ====
Voiced by: Ryōko Nagata (Japanese); Midge Mayes (Last Exile), Maeghan Albach (Fam, the Silver Wing) (English)

Wina Lightning (ウィナ・ライトニング, Uina Raitoningu) is the listening officer of the Silvana. Gifted with a perceptive hearing, she is tasked with matching the acoustic signature provided by Disith to that of Exile. She trains herself by continuously listening to the different acoustic signatures present in the Grand Stream, from the sound of a rainbird flock to the signature of a Disith battleship's remains. During the Silvana's final attack run at Delphine's base ship, she is able to hear Alex Row's final words before he dies with the base ship's destruction.

==== Lescius Dagobert ====
Voiced by: Kazuhiro Yamaji (Japanese); William Frederick Knight (English)

Sixty-six-year-old Lescius Dagobert (レシウス・ダゴベール, Reshiusu Dagobēru) is the Silvana's chief engineer and a member of one of the three Guild houses purged by Delphine Eraclea. Like other members of the Guild, he is interested in playing chess in his spare time and often provides counsel to Alex Row through the game. He is entrusted with the Mysterion held by his family but hands it to Alex on the eve of the assault against the Guild.

Lescius returns in Last Exile: Fam, the Silver Wing now serving as the chief engineer of the Silvius.

=== Anatoray's Nobility ===
==== Marius Bassianus ====
Voiced by: Yasuo Iwata (Japanese); Michael McConnohie (English)

Fifty-two-year-old Prime Minister Marius Bassianus (マリウス・バシアヌス, Mariusu Bashianusu) is a member of one of three Guild houses purged by Delphine Eraclea who was taken under the protection of the Anatoray royal family. After the death of his daughter Euris, Marius took care of Princess Sophia as if she were his own daughter. He and the Emperor killed each other during the Disith attack on the Anatoray capital after a dispute on Sophia's status as heir to the throne. He is entrusted with the Mysterion held by his family but surrenders it to Alex Row before his death so that it can be kept safe. His generosity is shown in the desire to grant land to Disith's people after its collapse and when he allows his Guild ship as training ground for the allied assault on Guild forces. Marius was the signatory of the proposed peace treaty with Disith that was lost ten years earlier.

==== David Mad-thane ====
Voiced by: Yōsuke Akimoto (Japanese); Bob Papenbrook (English)

Duke David Mad-thane (デーヴィッド・マドセイン, Dēviddo Madosein) is the commander of Anatoray's military defending the regions of Minagith and Norkia. Claus's and Lavie's attempt to cover his fleet's retreat in the battle at Minagith using only their vanship inspired Mad-thane. Seeing the potential of a vanship in battle, he sponsors the formation of vanship squadrons to act as fighter support in the assault against the Guild. He is portrayed as an optimistic character who wishes for peace, once believing "[t]here is hope yet for the world's survival" after meeting Disith commander Nestor Messina. Because of this attitude, he is often ridiculed by other commanding officers in the military who deem his actions are those of a coward.

==== Lady Mad-thane ====
Voiced by: Satsuki Yukino (Japanese); Mela Lee (English)

Lady Mad-thane (マドセイン婦人, Madosein Fujin) is the head of the Mad-thane residence in Norkia in her husband's absence. She assigned Claus and Lavie the delivery mission that takes them to the battle at Minagith. She later turns the residence into a makeshift hospital to care for Anatoray's and Disith's wounded soldiers during the assault against the Guild.

==== Holly Mad-thane ====
Voiced by: Kana Hanazawa (Japanese); Therese Nguyen (English)

Holly Mad-thane (ホリー・マドセイン, Horī Madosein) is the nine-year-old daughter of Duke and Lady Mad-thane. She asks Claus and Lavie to deliver her message (in addition to her mother's) to her father, who she fears will not return home from the battle at Minagith. After her message is broadcast aboard the Claimh Solais by Claus and Lavie, her father decides to hide his shame and retreat from the losing battle. Although Holly "used to always cry", her personality grows stronger by the end of the series. She later helps her mother care for the wounded soldiers of both Anatoray and Disith. She is one of the children taken by Exile to the new world. She also develops a friendship with Alvis Hamilton.

==== Emperor ====
Voiced by: Kōichi Kitamura (Japanese); Tony Pope (English)

The Emperor (皇帝, Kōtei) of Anatoray no longer pays attention to the suffering of his people. He is the father of Sophia and, at the age of sixty-five, dies during the invasion of the capital city not by the Disith forces, but at the hands of Marius Bassianus. His death leads to the succession of Sophia to the throne.

==== Vitellius Glamis ====
Voiced by: Takehiro Koyama (Note: It is unclear who some of the voice actors are as the credits for the English cast did not associate actors with their corresponding roles and the Japanese credits did not associate actors with minor roles.)

General Vitellius Glamis (ヴィテリウス・グラミス, Viteriusu Guramis) is a secondary character introduced in episode 15 who commands the Anatoray military. Upon learning of the Emperor's death during the Disith assault on the Anatoray capital, he orders his men to defend the capital with their own lives. His ambition drives him to defy a ceasefire order with Disith to the point that he is willing to kill heir apparent Princess Sophia in order to set "the foundation of a reborn Anatoray". The sixty-year-old is killed when the Urbanus destroys the Scolopendra Cannon used to bombard the attacking Disith ships. His name was based on the actual historical figure Vitellius, who led the Roman Empire for several months during the Year of the Four Emperors.

==== Charles Knowles ====
Voiced by: Hidetoshi Tsuchiya (Japanese); Michael McConnohie (English)

Count Charles Knowles (チャールズ・ノウルズ, Chāruzu Nouruzu) is the commanding officer of the Anatoray battleship Goliath, assigned to Mad-thane's fleet at Minagith. His ship is the first to retreat from the battlefield during the surprise attack by Disith, giving it the nickname the "Fleeing" Goliath. Charles is portrayed as a vain and egotistical character and orders his own face painted on the bow of the Goliath. He unknowingly challenges Alex Row to a ship-to-ship duel but regrets his action after realizing he is facing the Silvana. Charles orders his men to fire before the signal to commence is fired, expecting to destroy the Silvana in a surprise attack, but the Silvana is unharmed and sinks his ship in one volley. He perishes with the entire crew of the Goliath.

==== Henry Knowles ====
Voiced by: Yoshito Ishinami (Japanese); Michael McConnohie (English)

Duke Henry Knowles (ヘンリー・ノウルズ, Henrī Nouruzu) is a ranking Anatoray noble and the father of Count Charles Knowles, whom Alex Row defeats in a ship duel. He is provided with the opportunity to seek revenge for the "unnecessary" death of his son when Alex makes an appearance at the Horizon Cave black market auction. His men captures Alex at gunpoint, but Horizon Cave experiences a blackout when bombs destroy its power generators. Alex kills Henry's men in the confusion and escapes, leaving the sixty-nine-year-old nobleman empty-handed.

==== Giancarlo ====
Voiced by: Shigeru Ushiyama

Forty-three-year-old Giancarlo (ジャンカルロ, Jankaruro) is the manager of the Horizon Cave station and a subordinate to Duke Henry Knowles. He also serves as an auctioneer when the supposed Exile artifact is opened for bidding at the black market. He takes the artifact, auctioned at 50 billion Claudia, to Maestro Delphine Eraclea but discovers it to be fake. Delphine gives him a Guild ring as a "reward", but the ring's power kills him by turning him into dust.

=== Vanship pilots ===
==== Ralph Wednesday ====
Voiced by: Shinya Kitade (Japanese); Kirk Thornton (Last Exile), Greg Dulcie (Fam, the Silver Wing) (English)

Ralph Wednesday (ラルフ・ウェンズディ, Rarufu Uenzudi) is the courier who is initially responsible for delivering Alvis Hamilton to the Silvana. After receiving his mission at the age of twenty-eight, Ralph is relentlessly pursued by the Guild and is mortally wounded. On the day of the 75th Norkia Cup race, his vanship crosses path with that of Claus's and Lavie's. He asks the two to complete the mission in his stead and acts as a decoy to cover for their escape from the Guild. Ralph has an elder brother named Mikhail, who is also a vanship pilot.

==== Hurricane Hawk ====
Voiced by: Kōji Ishii (Japanese); Paul St. Peter (English)

Hurricane Hawk (ハリケンホーク, Harikenhōku) is the nickname of a vanship race pilot. He is known throughout the frontier town of Norkia for his two prior consecutive wins in the Norkia Cup race. Hawk begins the race in the pole position but is overtaken by Claus and Lavie during its final stage. He is forced to withdraw when his vanship collides with that of Ralph Wednesday. Hawk is one of the pilots recruited to fly as fighter support in the assault against the Guild.

==== Fat Chicken ====
Voiced by: Seiko Tomoe (Japanese); Melodee Spevack (English)

Fat Chicken (ファットチキン, Fattochikin) is the nickname of a vanship pilot whom Lavie alternatively names as "Piggy Bird" due to her weight. She starts the 75th Norkia Cup race in second position but is forced to withdraw after experiencing difficulty in navigating a narrow segment of the track. She is one of the pilots recruited to fly as fighter support in the assault against the Guild.

==== Sunny Boy ====
Voiced by: Masaki Aizawa (Japanese); Dave Mallow (English)

Sunny Boy (サニーボーイ, Sanībōi) is the nickname of a vanship pilot whom Lavie alternatively names as "Nosehair". He wins the 75th Norkia Cup race when Claus and Hurricane Hawk withdraw after colliding with Ralph Wednesday. He is one of the pilots recruited to fly as fighter support in the assault against the Guild.

=== Others ===
==== Nestor Messina ====
Voiced by: Kinryū Arimoto

Sixty-year-old Nestor Messina (ネストル・メッシーナ, Nesutoru Messhīna) is the commander of the Disith forces that invaded Anatoray. He fell victim to a blizzard in Disith, leaving him unable to open his right hand. After Sophia assumes the throne of Anatoray, she goes to parley with Nestor in hopes of forming an alliance and reveals to him the proposed peace treaty to Disith that was lost ten years earlier. Nestor ascertains Sophia's sincerity and provides Anatoray with a map of the Grand Stream and the acoustic signature of Exile. Nestor is well respected by his Anatoray counterparts, especially by Duke David Mad-thane, because he "seems to understand the meaning of chivalry" and is unwilling to sacrifice his men in a meaningless battle.

==== Hamilcar Valca ====
Voiced by: Tetsuo Kanao (Japanese); Kirk Thornton (English)

Hamilcar Valca (ハミルカル・ヴァルカ, Hamirukaru Varuka) is the father of Claus Valca. Although Valca came from nobility, he took his family to Norkia out of love for its free skies. He became immediate friends with Georges Head, and the two became a famous vanship courier duo. They died in the attempt to deliver a peace offer to Disith when Exile's defense system reacted to their presence in the Grand Stream. Valca died at the age of thirty-four and when Claus was five years old. His name was derived from the actual historical figure Hamilcar Barca, Carthaginian general during the First Punic War and father of the famous tactician Hannibal.

==== Justina Valca ====
Voiced by: Keiko Aizawa (Japanese); Dorothy Elias-Fahn (English)

Justina Valca (ユスティーナ・ヴァルカ, Yusutīna Varuka) is the mother of Claus Valca. After the Valca family moved to Norkia and became neighbors with the Heads, Justina took care of Lavie, whose mother died in childbirth. According to Lavie, Justina died at the age of twenty-eight, just six months after her husband disappeared in the Grand Stream, leaving both Claus and Lavie as orphans.

==== Georges Head ====
Voiced by: Kazuaki Itō (Japanese); Jamieson Price (English)

Georges Head (ジョルジュ・ヘッド, Joruju Heddo) is the father of Lavie Head. His wife died in childbirth, leaving him to raise Lavie as a single parent. When the Valca family moved next door, he immediately became good friends with Hamilcar Valca and served as his vanship navigator. Head died at the age of thirty-five attempting to cross the Grand Stream with Valca when Lavie was five years old. Lavie later finds his remains inside Exile.

==== Walker ====
Voiced by: Ken Yamaguchi (Japanese); Jamieson Price (English)

Walker (ウォーカー, Wōkā) is the owner of the Casino Royale, an airborne casino and repair station where many ships arrive for their shore leave. He is an acquaintance of Alex Row and refers to the Silvana as his "outlaw friends". When the Silvana arrives for repairs from its battle against Guild fighters, Walker provides a tip to Alex Row on the Exile artifact being sold in auction at Horizon Cave. He provides repair services for the ship again after its battle with the Urbanus. He is seen throughout the series wearing an eyepatch and is thirty-years-old.

=== The Guild ===
The Guild crest is one of the many allusions made throughout the series that the world of Prester is in the shape of an hourglass.

The Guild (ギルド, Girudo) serves as the arbitrator between the Anatoray and Disith nations.

==== Dio Eraclea ====
Voiced by: Junko Noda (Japanese); Joshua Seth (Last Exile), Greg Ayres (Fam, the Silver Wing) (English)

Principal Dio Eraclea (ディーオ・エラクレア, Dīo Erakurea) is the sixteen-year-old younger brother of the most powerful Guild member, Maestro Delphine Eraclea. People see him as a rare find that will someday take over the Guild. He is very playful and fearless, and treats many things like they were games. His odd nature can be seen in his awe of Claus Valca's skills and giving him the nickname "Immelmann" (referring to the World War I German ace, Max Immelmann and the maneuver Claus frequently used while flying, the Immelmann turn). This strange nature is mostly due to the Guild lifestyle and fear of his sister Delphine. His first appearance in the series is marked by a chess-match with his beloved friend Lucciola and with the Guild's power and surveillance, watches the skies of a skirmish between Guild ships searching for Alvis Hamilton and the Silvana. He finds extraordinary talent in Claus's vanship piloting, and after the Horizon Cave Eight vanship race, he starts to have strong interactions with the main characters. He later joins them on the Silvana in order to escape his sister. Though his initial presence with the Silvana was unwanted, his participations and interactions with Claus and Alvis eventually earn the entire crew's trust, and is acknowledged as one of them, during a birthday party proposed by Alvis. He is forced back to the Guild during the end of the series, and is brainwashed by a Guild device in preparation for the "Rite of the Covenant".

Driven to insanity, he participates in the Rite of the Covenant, where the next Maestro is chosen, and emerges victorious. He escapes with Claus and Alvis soon after and is nursed back to health in the Mad-Thane residence. He flees from there in a vanship and travels to the Grand Stream. Being delirious, his memory resets to the moment of the race in Horizon Cave, and he attempts to pass Claus. At that moment he tells his navi, Lucciola (who isn't there), to jump out so they can get more speed. He crosses a flock of rainbirds believing them to be the finish line and congratulates Lucciola on their victory and invites him to celebrate, but he then turns around to find he is not there. Believing Lucciola had actually jumped from the vanship, he attempts to cross to his seat while crying, but his vanship is then hit by a gust of wind and he is swallowed by the Grand Stream.

Despite this, his voice is heard during a later scene in the Silvana's engine room cheering "Ascending!" In addition, there is a scene depicted in the series' official artwork showing Claus, Lavie, and their friends living on the farm turning and smiling at an individual. Though all that can be seen is one foot and a waving hand, the individual appears to be wearing a Guild uniform. In the Last Exile Aerial Log artbook, notes by the creators revealed that Dio survived after being rescued by a passing Guild ship and later joining Claus, Lavie, and their friends journey to Earth.

In Last Exile -Fam, The Silver Wing, Dio is a member of the Sky Pirates yet is secretly a scout for the Silvius. Since the events of Last Exile, his personality is back to normal and remembers what happened to Lucciola which he honors his late friend's memory by riding his vanship alone and telling those who ride the backseat not to touch anything.

Dio is also the Italian word for "God"; many of the Guild members have Italian names.

==== Lucciola ====
Voiced by: Tomoe Hanba (Japanese); Mona Marshall (Last Exile), Sean Michael Teague (Fam, the Silver Wing) (English)

Lucciola (ルシオラ, Rushiora) is a member of the Guild and personal bodyguard to Dio Eraclea. He is an exceptional martial artist and is one year older than Dio. He was assigned the role of protecting him from a very early age, and Dio considers Lucciola not just a servant, but also a friend. Lucciola is forced to betray that trust out of fear of Maestro Delphine Eraclea when Maestro ordered him to bring Dio back before her. Lucciola then redeems himself by helping Claus, and Alvis and Dio escape from the grasp of the Maestro. In a confrontation against the Maestro, Lucciola kills his brother, Cicada, and is then disintegrated by a ring that is given to him by Maestro Delphine as a "gift."

Lucciola's name is Italian and means firefly.

==== Delphine Eraclea ====
Voiced by: Michiko Neya (Japanese); Karen Strassman (Last Exile), Mary Morgan (Fam, the Silver Wing) (English)

Maestro Delphine Eraclea (デルフィーネ・エラクレア, Derufīne Erakurea) is the series' main antagonist, Dio's twenty-four-year-old older sister, and head of the Guild. A run-in between her and Alex Row in the past has left her the sole target of his vengeance, and one of his only goals is to personally kill Delphine. The Maestro is portrayed as a decadent aristocrat, callous and ruthless in her ways. When Lucciola decided to let Dio escape, the Maestro, feigning interest in his plea to let Dio go free, killed him with a device (in the shape of a ring) that essentially disintegrated him. However, she did not go unpunished, for Alex managed to strangle and break her neck, even though he had been tied in place by rose tendrils. Like her favorite flower, the rose, the Maestro is beautiful but dangerous. With her death and the release of Exile by Alvis Hamilton, the might of the Guild was broken, never to be restored again.

Delphine possesses a veritable arsenal of psychological weapons she uses frequently, which explains Dio's fear of her. She is truly heartless when it comes to the Guild, and takes great delight in the wastefulness that her people go through to attain and prepare meals, such as the meat of a type of yak from the frozen wastes, the capture of which leads to the deaths of countless hunters, Kerasion mousse, which contains an ingredient so rare only a handful is gathered each year, and catfish that took 100 gallons of First Water to remove the mud. During the Trial of Agoon, she demonstrated an ability to restore the dead to life; everyone who died in the Trial was seen scampering to her feet as she said "I have renewed your lives."

It is unknown whether she has any real combative power of her own. Due to her impossibly immense oppressive influence, she really only needs her truly loyal subordinates to do her work, namely Cicada and his attack force. The only evidence of power she may have is in that she killed off the other families and remained as the sole house of the keys to Exile, which she stole the Mysteria from each house-except for house Hamilton's, the one she lost to Alex Row at Giancarlos' auction at the price of 500 billion Claudia.

==== Guild Agents ====
The Maestro Delphine has many loyal Guild members at her disposal. Some include bodyguards and maids, to fighter pilots and counselors. They tend to fall into two groups: Aspis (アスピス, Asupisu) and Scutum (スクトゥム, Sukutumu). The names of the Guild servants all seemed to be named after insects.

The most powerful of the Maestro's entourage is Cicada (シカーダ, Shikāda), the servant to Maestro Delphine and the elder brother of Lucciola. A man of thirty-one, he is skilled in hand-to-hand combat and prevents Alex Row from assassinating Delphine when the Guild boards the Silvana. However, Lucciola kills him in combat in front of Delphine after Claus, Alvis, and Dio escape from the Guild stronghold. Cicada is voiced by Naoki Makijima in Japanese and Dave Mallow in English.

The Maestro also has two maids, Nix (ニクス, Nikusu) and Pluvia (プルウィア, Puruuia) who are part of the Maestro's Aspis. The nineteen-year-old male servants Apis (アピス, Apisu) and Coccinella (コキネラ, Kokinera) are also a part of the Aspis. Twenty-three-year-old Ephemera (エフェメラ, Efemera), twenty-six-year-old Allomyrina (アロミリナ, Aromirina), twenty-eight-year-old Phalaena (ファラエナ, Faraena), and twenty-seven-year-old Dorcus (ドルクス, Dorukusu) are her other agents and a part of the Scutum.

== Last Exile: Fam, the Silver Wing ==
Last Exile -Fam, The Silver Wing- (ラストエグザイル～銀翼のファム～, Rasuto Eguzairu Ginyoku no Famu) is the sequel to the original Last Exile. The main character Fam Fan Fan is part of the Sky Pirates, a group that assaults ships following the code of the "First Harpoon". (Note: The code of the First Harpoon means that the first pilot to hit the target with a harpoon has the right to decide how to proceed on the assault.) They target minor vessels and prosper on an isolated location, until one day they take off for a mission that will change their lives forever when they get involved in the war against the Ades Federation.

=== Protagonists ===
==== Fam Fan Fan ====
Voiced by: Aki Toyosaki (Japanese); Jad Saxton (English)

Fam Fan Fan (ファム・ファン・ファン, Famu Fan Fan) is a fifteen-year-old Vespa pilot for the Sky Pirates. The Sky Pirates found her at a vanship wreck where her parents died and adopted her. Fam is very skillful in piloting vanships and dreams of "peace in the free skies." Her ambitions are to restore the Kingdom of Turan and re-launch the Grand Race, just like Giselle's father. She is actually General Sadri's granddaughter.

==== Giselle Collette ====
Voiced by: Aoi Yūki (Japanese); Leah Clark (English)

Fifteen-year-old Giselle Collette (ジゼル・コレット, Jizeru Koretto) is Fam's best friend and navigator. In contrast to the reckless Fam, she is more introverted. Giselle is the daughter of the Sky Pirate's chief, Atamora Collette. She is a very capable navigator. She also has very good knowledge regarding the architectural structure of ships, being able to draw out a detailed blueprint of internal structures just by looking at a picture of the ship itself. Being the eldest daughter, she is very capable in handling housework such as cooking and cleaning while taking care of her brothers and sisters. She is affectionately called "Gisey" by Fam.

==== Millia il Velch Cutrettola Turan ====
Voiced by: Ai Kayano (Japanese); Carrie Savage (English)

Fifteen-year-old Millia il Velch Cutrettola Turan (ミリア・イル・ヴェルク・クトレットラ・トゥラン, Miria Iru Veruku Kutorettora Touran) is the younger princess of the Kingdom of Turan. Millia and her older sister Liliana have taken on the task of ruling the kingdom despite their young ages due to the illness of their father, the King of Turan. In contrast to her more composed older sister Liliana, Millia is a bit more brash and impulsive. She was also the assistant pilot for Fam, once for taking her sister Liliana's cup; and again for successfully scuttling the Ades Federation battleship Anshar, which they later restored. She can speak the Glacian language and serves as an interpreter for Fam and Giselle when speaking with Dian. She is now the interim captain of the battleship Sylvius, while Captain Tatiana Wisla was gone riding with her vanship to Grand Exile. And she inherits the power of Exile after her sister was shot down by Dian while shielding Luscinia/Lukea.

=== Kingdom of Turan ===
==== Liliana il Grazioso Merlo Turan ====
Voiced by: Miyuki Sawashiro (Japanese); Jamie Marchi (English)

Liliana il Grazioso Merlo Turan (リリアーナ・イル・グラツィオーソ・メルロー・トゥラン, Ririāna Iru Guratsuiōso Merurō Touran) is the nineteen-year-old princess of the Kingdom of Turan and the King's eldest daughter. In contrast to her sister Millia, she is a graceful and kind woman. As a stand-in for her bedridden father, she is highly skilled in politics and she is essentially responsible for the governing of Turan.

==== Teddy ====
Voiced by: Chiwa Saitō (Japanese); Kara Edwards (English)

Teddy (テディ, Tedei) is Princess Millia's butler. He is a bit clumsy and very much immature in many ways, but still puts in his utmost effort to serve Millia every day.

==== Marianne ====
Voiced by: Eri Sendai (Japanese); Martha Harms (English)

Marianne (マリアンヌ, Mariannu) is a friend and maid of Millia.

=== Ades Federation ===
==== Sārā Augusta ====
Voiced by: Kanae Itō (Japanese); Monica Rial (English)

Sārā Augusta (サーラ・アウグスタ, Sāra Augusuta) is the reigning empress of the Ades Federation. She is the only daughter of the former empress Farahnāz Augusta who survived the assassination attempt on her mother. She happens to be the key to the Grand Exile.

==== Luscinia Hāfez ====
Voiced by: Kazuyuki Okitsu (Japanese); Duncan Brannan (English)

Luscinia Hāfez (ルスキニア・ハーフェズ, Rusukinia Hāfezu) is the Premier of the Ades Federation and the main antagonist of the series. As a man with overwhelming charisma, he receives strong support from members of the military. He is shown to have a soft heart towards Sārā Augusta. He and Liliana were childhood friends in the past. In the flashback of Last Exile 10 years ago, during Empress Farahnāz's era, he is the bodyguard under the name of Lukea, along with his friend Alauda. He is kind and calm, rarely smiling except when he helped the young Princess Lilliana after she slipped. He feels guilty for failing to protect the late Empress, and has planned to take revenge for the Empress' assassination by mercilessly killing those who turned against Empress Farahnāz's rule, and intends to fulfill her dream by uniting the world in peace under the control of the empire. She was killed while protecting Princess Lilliana from the assassin's bullet. Luscinia lost his left eye due to that battle.

==== Alauda ====
Voiced by: Masaya Matsukaze (Japanese); Christopher Bevins (English)

Alauda (アラウダ, Arauda) is a top intelligence agent of the Ades Federation and reports directly to Luscinia. He supports from the shadows through covert operations, assassinations, and other means.

==== Sadri ====
Voiced by: Takaya Hashi (Japanese); R Bruce Elliott (English)

Sadri (サドリ, Sadori) is one of the five leading generals of the Ades Federation. He is the leader of the other four generals who are highly skilled but lack the experience. He commands the First Fleet Anshar. His vast experience gives him great knowledge of utilizing his fleets to gain a tactical advantage. It's later revealed that he's actually Fam's grandfather.

==== Kayvān ====
Voiced by: Katsuyuki Konishi (Japanese); Brian Mathis (English)

Kayvān (カイヴァーン, Kaivān) is one of the five leading generals of the Ades Federation who supports Luscinia Hāfez. He commands the Second Fleet Raktavija, which is widely known as the strongest annihilation unit and feared by neighboring countries. He is shown to have a soft heart towards Sārā Augusta.

==== Ōrang ====
Voiced by: Jun Fukuyama (Japanese); Ian Sinclair (English)

Ōrang (オーラン, Ōran) is one of the five leading generals of the Ades Federation. He commands the Third Fleet Admirari, which is balanced in both its offensive and defensive powers. He utilizes his fleet alongside the Fourth Fleet to serve as an advance guard. During the battle of Boreas he decides to switch sides and support Sārā Augusta's fraction rather than Luscinia's. He opens on fire on Sorūsh's flagship to prevent him from attacking Sārā's forces and taking her captive. His fleet suffers big damage while defending Boreas during the First Fleet attack.

==== Sorūsh ====
Voiced by: Yuichi Nakamura (Japanese); John Burgmeier (English)

Sorūsh (ソルーシュ, Sorūshu) is one of the five leading generals of the Ades Federation. He commands the Fourth Fleet Senapati, which comprises fast battleships that specialize in surprise attacks. Having attended the military academy together with Ōrang, the pair make a formidable combination. During the battle of Boreas, out of loyalty to Empress Sārā, Ōrang prevents Sorūsh from attacking the ship that carried her by opening fire on Sorūsh's flagship. As a result of the attack, Senapati crashes into the valley.

==== Vasant ====
Voiced by: Fumiko Orikasa (Japanese); Gwendolyn Lau (English)

Vasant (ヴァサント, Vasanto) is one of the five leading generals of the Ades Federation. She commands the Fifth Fleet Anaitis, responsible for defending the capital and has a reputation of making it an impregnable fortress. She was killed defending Sārā from Luscinia, who aims to abduct her.

==== Roshanak Babar ====
Voiced by: Maaya Sakamoto (Japanese); Wendy Powell (English)

Roshanak Babar (ロシャナク・ババール, Roshanaku Babāru) is a member of the Ades's aristocratic Babar family.

==== Farahnāz Augusta ====
Voiced by: Mabuki Andou (Japanese); Stephanie Young (English)

Farahnāz Augusta (ファラフナーズ・アウグスタ, Farahnāz Augusta) was the previous Empress of Ades ten years ago and Sārā's late mother. Farahnāz previously led the war against the Exile nations to reclaim the lands they stole from its original inhabitants but realizing the lives and suffering it brought and the development of racism between the Natives and Exiles, she ended the wars by signing a peace treaty with all the nations of the world. Regretting what the wars have done, she hoped the peace treaty would lead to both races to be peacefully united and live in a world without hatred, especially for her infant daughter Sārā. Farahnāz was well loved and a kind leader who treated her Guild bodyguards, Luscinia and Alauda, like her own sons whom she also shared her dreams of peace with them. However, during the Grand Race, a vanship race to celebrate the signing of the peace treaties, Farahnāz was assassinated by Exile terrorists who wanted revenge for their comrades' death due to the war. Her death led to a huge impact on everyone who knew her, especially Luscinia, who started to hate the Exiles and later becoming the Ades Federation Premier where he wants to fulfill Farahnāz's late dream of uniting the people of Earth by force by leading a war of conquest.

=== Sky Pirates ===
==== Dio Eraclea ====
Voiced by: Junko Noda (Japanese); Greg Ayres (English)

==== Atamora Collette ====
Voiced by: Tetsu Inada (Japanese); Brad Jackson (English)

Atamora Collette (アタモラ・コレット, Atamora Koretto) is Giselle's father and the leader of the Sky Pirates of Kartoffel. He, along with Kaiser, won the first Grand Race.

==== Tereza Collette ====
Voiced by: Takako Honda (Japanese); Melinda Wood Allen (English)

Tereza Collette (テレザ・コレット, Tereza Koretto) is Atamora's wife and Giselle's mother.

==== Félicité, René and Adele Collette ====
Voiced by: Nao Tōyama (Félicité) Kanako Miyamoto (René) Kanae Itō (Adele) (Japanese); Apphia Yu (Félicité), Lara Woodhull (René), Holly Franklin (Adele) (English)

Félicité Collette (フェリシテ・コレット, Ferishite Koretto), René Collette (ルネ・コレット, Rune Koretto) and Adele Collette (アデル・コレット, Aderu Koretto) are Atamora and Tereza's children and Giselle's younger siblings.

==== Fritz ====
Voiced by: KENN (Japanese); Joel McDonald (English)

Fritz (フリッツ, Furittsu) is a Sky Pirate Vanship pilot.

==== Heine ====
Voiced by: Atsushi Abe (Japanese); Corey Cleary-Stoner (English)

Heine (ハイネ, Haine) is Fritz's navigator.

==== Johann ====
Voiced by: Nobuhiko Okamoto (Japanese); Aaron Dismuke (English)

Johann (ヨハン, Yohan) is a Sky Pirate Vespa pilot.

=== Other Silvius Crew Members ===
==== Cecily ====
Voiced by: Megumi Nakajima (Japanese); Alexis Tipton (English)

Cecily (セシリー, Seshirī) is the listening officer of the Silvius.

=== Glacies ===
==== Dyan ====
Voiced by: Yukana (Japanese); Tatiana Balazs (English)

Leader of the Glacies Rocket Fighter Adamas Squadron. Known as the "Winged Witches", they are respected in their country as the defenders of Glacies. Dyan rescued Fam, Giselle and Millia after the three were on the run from the Ades Federation to, as she revealed, repay a debt for Fam and Millia helping her squad mates Primula and Magnolia during the Silvius battle with the Ades 1st fleet. While she shelters them and help them repair their Vespa, Fam tries to form a friendship with Dyan despite the language barrier. While attempting to kill Luscinia later, she killed Princess Liliana, who gave her life to shield him.

==== Viola ====
Voiced by: Jenya (Japanese); Yana Kolmakova (English)

Dyan's navigator.

==== Primula ====
Voiced by: Sayuri Hara (Japanese); Marie Charlson (English)

A Rocket Fighter pilot who goes by the Call sign "03". She and her navigator Magnolia were saved by Fam and Millia after their vanship hits a rock during the battle between the Ades 1st Fleet and the Silvius.

==== Magnolia ====
Voiced by: Chiaki Omigawa (Japanese); Caitlin Glass (English)

Primula's navigator who can speak the common language that is spoken on Earth. Since she is at odds with Millia after her sister Liliana sent an Exile to defeat Glacies, she becomes Dyan's interpreter.

== Merchandise ==
A 136-page art book, Last Exile Aerial Log, containing character sketches and supplemental material was published in 2005 but has since gone out of print. Murata has also released several self-published art books, under the collective title of SPHERES, containing additional character and design sketches used in Last Exile promotional posters. Seven promotional busts were made by Alter, a Japanese figure company, in 2006 depicting Claus, Lavie, Alvis, Tatiana, Alex, Dio and Lucciola as chess pieces. The seventh figure was of the iconic silver vanship.

== Reception ==
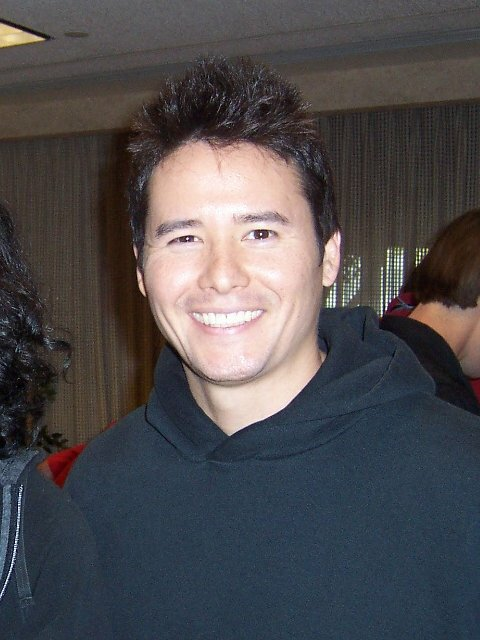
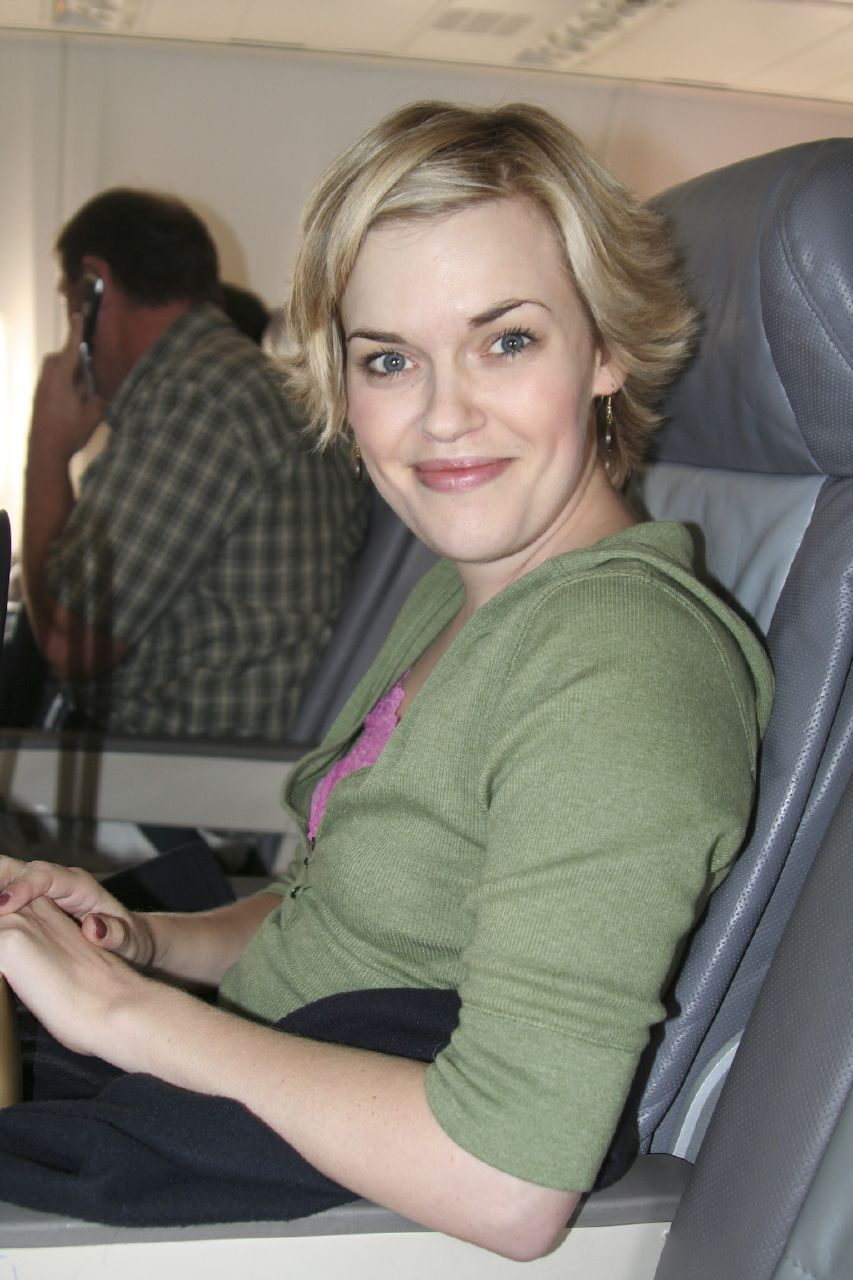
Johnny Yong Bosch and Kari Wahlgren were the voice actors for Claus Valca and Lavie Head in the English dubbed version of Last Exile.

Reviewers have praised Murata's work in designing the characters of Last Exile. South African magazine New Age Gaming called him an artist "who is quickly making a name for himself with a style that is as recognizable as works by artists like Masamune Shirow or Tetsuya Nomura". (Shirow is known for his work in Ghost in the Shell, and Nomura is known for his work in the Final Fantasy series.) His signature style is easily distinguishable and can also be recognized from Blue Submarine No. 6 and his art book Robot and Rule. According to the magazine, "his female characters have very round, cue-ball like heads you just want to sink in the corner pocket". The unique style also brought some reviewers to believe that the series more resembles a work of Hayao Miyazaki rather than Gonzo.

The English dubbed version of the series, first released by Geneon Entertainment, was also well received by reviewers. Geneon hired Bang Zoom! Entertainment to produce the dubbed version of Last Exile, which Ryan Mathews of Anime News Network has praised as "the best Bang Zoom dub of all I've experienced". Production of the English version of the series was directed by Eric Sherman. Mathews goes on to say that "[t]he role of spunky young Lavie is a perfect fit for [Kari Wahlgren]". On the other hand, Johnny Yong Bosch's performance as Claus Valca was called "one of his softest performances". The dubbed version also demonstrated "a clear delineation ... in terms of emotionality and overall tone" between the two main characters and the crew of the Silvana. A comparison to the original Japanese version of Last Exile shows that the English adaptation stays true to the original dialogue and only deviates to accommodate for pacing.

== See also ==
- List of Last Exile episodes
