= Last Exile =

Japanese anime television series

- Cover art of the Japanese volume 1 compilation DVD for Last Exile, featuring main characters Lavie Head and Claus Valca
- Genre: Adventure; Dieselpunk; Steampunk
- Created by: Gonzo
- Anime television series
- Directed by: Koichi Chigira
- Produced by: Hiroyuki Birukawa; Naoshi Imamoto
- Written by: Koichi Chigira; Gonzo
- Music by: Hitomi Kuroishi
- Studio: Gonzo
- Licensed by: Crunchyroll
- Original network: TV Tokyo
- English network: CA: G4techTV (Anime Current); US: TechTV/G4techTV, AZN Television; ZA: Animax
- Original run: April 8, 2003 – September 30, 2003
- Episodes: 26
- Manga

Last Exile: Fam, the Silver Wing
- Written by: Gonzo
- Illustrated by: Robo Miyamoto
- Published by: Kadokawa Shoten
- Magazine: Young Ace
- Original run: July 4, 2011 – October 4, 2012
- Volumes: 3
- Manga

Last Exile: Travelers from the Hourglass
- Written by: Gonzo
- Illustrated by: Minoru Murao
- Published by: Kadokawa
- Magazine: Newtype Ace
- Original run: September 10, 2011 – June 10, 2012
- Volumes: 2
- Anime television series

Last Exile: Fam, the Silver Wing
- Directed by: Yukio Takahashi (Chief); Koichi Chigira
- Produced by: Hiroyuki Birukawa; Tadashi Hoshino; Masami Abe
- Written by: Kiyoko Yoshimura
- Music by: Hitomi Kuroishi
- Studio: Gonzo
- Licensed by: Crunchyroll
- Original network: CBC
- English network: SEA: Animax Asia
- Original run: October 15, 2011 – March 24, 2012
- Episodes: 21
- Anime film

Last Exile: Fam, the Silver Wing: Over the Wishes
- Directed by: Yukio Takahashi
- Written by: Shūichi Kōyama
- Music by: Hitomi Kuroishi
- Studio: Gonzo
- Released: February 6, 2016
- Runtime: 120 minutes
- icon

Last Exile (ラストエグザイル, Rasuto Eguzairu) is a Japanese anime television series created by Gonzo. It featured a production team led by director Koichi Chigira, character designer Range Murata, and production designer Mahiro Maeda. The three had previously worked together in Blue Submarine No. 6, one of the first CG anime series. It aired on TV Tokyo from April to September 2003. A sequel series, Last Exile: Fam, the Silver Wing (ラストエグザイル～銀翼のファム～, Rasuto Eguzairu Gin'yoku no Famu), aired from October 2011 to March 2012. A film adaptation of the series, Last Exile: Fam, the Silver Wing: Over the Wishes, was released in February 2016.

The story is set on the fictional world of Prester, where its inhabitants use aerial vehicles known as vanships as a means of transportation. On this world, which is divided in eternal conflict between the nations of Anatoray and Disith, sky couriers Claus Valca and Lavie Head must deliver a girl who holds the key to uniting the two factions. Although Prester itself is not a representation of Earth, it features technology reminiscent of nineteenth century Europe at the dawn of the Industrial Revolution. Many of its designs were also inspired by Germany's technological advances during the interwar period.

The series was licensed in North America by Geneon Entertainment in June 2003, two months after the first episode aired in Japan. Funimation began licensing the series after Geneon ceased production of its titles, later licensing the sequel series. It was also licensed for English releases in the United Kingdom, originally by ADV Films until its closure in 2009, and is now licensed by Manga Entertainment, and in Australia by Madman Entertainment. Other published media included two soundtracks, two manga, and artbooks.

Last Exile has received widespread critical acclaim and is considered to be one of Gonzo's best works. It has been praised for its narrative, visuals, themes, soundtrack and production values.

== Setting ==
Last Exile is set on the fictional world of Prester. (Note: Although not mentioned during the series, the name "Prester" was published in additional materials released by Gonzo and its subsequent licensors Geneon Entertainment and Funimation Entertainment.) Prester's two nations of Anatoray and Disith are separated by a turbulent region of the sky known as the Grand Stream and are engaged in conflict according to the code of chivalric warfare. A superior faction known as the Guild enforces these rules. It also provides the two nations with technology but, unknown to them, has dishonorable intentions, to preserve the status quo and enforce its dominance of both sides. Although the story is set in the future, the technology employed differs from that in a typical space opera. Instead, the show's retro-futuristic setting resembles nineteenth-century Europe at the height of the Industrial Revolution. Inhabitants of Prester operate aerial vehicles known as vanships in the world's Golden Age of Aviation; although the technology is primitive, the aerial vehicles use a form of antigravity (developed by the Guild) and lighter-than-air methods of flight rather than the use of wings.

Designs of the vanship, a type of aerial vehicle, were based on Germany's Junkers A 35 monoplane produced in the 1920s.

Various scenes in the series also show existing tension between the upper and lower classes. Anatoray's nobility and military officers generally believe that commoners do not understand their codes of chivalry. On the other hand, the lower class also despise the aristocracy for their monopoly on resources. (Note: Mad-thane Chief of Staff: "No child or commoner could understand the ways of chivalry, and especially not vanship pilots!" Claus Valca: "That's not true! We understand!" Lavie Head: "Have you ever had a day where you couldn't sleep because you were too hungry? As far as I'm concerned, chivalry can kiss my ass!") This tension extends to the accessibility of clean water, which varies in price according to purity grades. (Note: First Water (一番水, Iciban Mizu) is a high-quality drink sold at Walker's floating repair station, the Casino Royale, for 80 Claudia. Upon learning of the price, Lavie Head, who comes from the rural town of Norkia, reacts with astonishment. Third Water (3番水, Sanban Mizu) is the highest grade of drinking water available at the rural mining town of Norkia and is taken directly from groundwater.) In the larger story, the advanced Guild society is portrayed as degenerate and lazy, while the people of Anatoray and Disith are creative and industrious.

The series introduces viewers to a wide range of naval and military vocabulary. (Note: A glossary defining unfamiliar terms and technology is provided (Archived December 31, 2008, at the Wayback Machine) on the Japanese-language website published by JVC. The English-language version of this glossary was made available on Geneon Entertainment's former Flash-based website under the "Story" section in the menu.) More primitive navigational methods such as dead reckoning and instruments such as the sextant are also used in the series. (Note: Alister Agrew: (Peering through a sextant) "The stars are becoming unreliable. You can't get a correct bearing even if you look at the stars.")

== Plot ==
=== Last Exile ===
The story revolves around fifteen-year-old pilot Claus Valca and navigator Lavie Head, who fly their vanship as sky couriers in the nation of Anatoray. Although they usually take up missions of relatively low difficulty, they are one day asked to complete the mission of a dying courier. The mission, rated seven stars out of ten, is to deliver a young girl named Alvis Hamilton to the mysterious battleship Silvana. Despite their fears, Claus and Lavie deliver Alvis to the battleship but decide to remain aboard to keep her safe. Claus and Lavie are initially treated as intruders but eventually befriend the crew of the Silvana. They learn that the Guild intends to capture Alvis for reasons unknown to them. In the first battle between the Silvana and Guild forces, Guild member Dio Eraclea takes an interest in Claus's flying skills and his signature move, the Immelmann turn. Wanting to learn more about Claus, Dio willingly allows himself to be captured. He reveals to the Silvana's captain, Alex Row, the existence of one of four Mysteria which act as a key to something known as Exile.

When the Silvana's executive officer, Sophia Forrester, is revealed to be the Emperor's daughter and heir, she returns to Anatoray at the request of the prime minister. Sophia assumes the throne after the Emperor is killed during a surprise attack at the capital by the Disith nation and pleads for an alliance with Disith in order to capture Exile and end the Guild's control. Sophia reveals to Claus that Alvis is linked to the Mysteria, but as preparations for the assault are made, Alvis is captured by the Guild.

Delphine Eraclea, the Maestro of the Guild, reveals that Exile is a colony ship used by those who first settled their world, and she intends to use Alvis and the Mysteria to take control of it. However, Claus and Alvis escape the Guild stronghold and are reunited with Lavie when the alliance fleet attacks. As the fleet follows Exile past the Grand Stream and enters Disith, it is able to destroy Delphine's forces. After Claus and Alvis recite the four Mysteria, Exile reveals itself as a starship that will carry people back to their old home world.

=== Last Exile: Travelers from the Hourglass ===
A manga set right after the events of Last Exile and before Fam, the Silver Wing, Travelers from the Hourglass continues the story of Claus, Lavie, Alvis, and the others who left Prester and settled on Earth, their ancestors' home world. As they get used to their new home, Al is pursued by the Earth Guild.

=== Last Exile: Fam, the Silver Wing ===
Taking place two years after the events of Last Exile, Last Exile: Fam, the Silver Wing: Over the Wishes is set on Earth, the original home world of the colonists of Prester. The new story focuses on Fam Fan Fan and Giselle Collette, two vespa vanship pilots who work as Sky Pirates, capturing and selling battleships for a living. Fam and Giselle get into an adventure when they and the Sky Pirates rescue Liliana il Grazioso Merlo Turan and her younger sister, Millia Il Velch Cutrettola Turan, Princesses of the Turan Kingdom, from the clutches of the mighty Ades Federation. The Federation, led by Empress Sārā Augusta and Premier Luscinia Hāfez, is on an all out war against nations who descended from immigrants who came back to Earth by Exile ships.

As Ades was the only nation to stay on Earth when it was in a state of chaos and ruin, Luscinia believes that the Exile immigrants have no right to return to Earth since their ancestors abandoned Earth when it was in chaos only to return when Earth was viable to live on again and force the original inhabitants of Earth off their lands to form their own nations. To return these lands to their original inhabitants, Luscinia leads the Ades Federation to conquer the immigrant nations and destroy their armies, with Turan being one of them. After Luscinia kidnaps Liliana, who has the ability to control an Exile, Luscinia summons an Exile to destroy Iglasia, the capital of Turan, killing its soldiers and the King of Turan, leading to the surrender of Turan to Ades. With everything she cared for lost, Millia is given refuge by the Sky Pirates, where Fam promises to help Millia regain her kingdom.

== Production ==
Last Exile was created by Gonzo in celebration of the company's 10th anniversary. It featured a production team led by director Koichi Chigira, character designer Range Murata, and production designer Mahiro Maeda. The three had previously worked together to create Blue Submarine No. 6, one of the first CG anime series.

=== Art design ===
Complex chessboard design by Makoto Kobayashi. All episode titles utilize terminology from chess, and the game appears throughout the series. (Note: See the list of Last Exile episodes for details on specific chess terms that are used.)

Conceptual designs were created by Range Murata, who was given complete freedom to create the setting. He began drawing detailed sketches of machines and everyday objects from a daily newspaper. His research was given no constraints with the exception of production deadlines. Gonzo initially intended for Last Exile to be shown in a space setting, but producers did not want the characters to wear sterile space suits. Murata believed the design took "the course the story had laid out". His character conceptualization included a great amount of time spent on costume design. Wanting to portray each character's personality more fully, he "tried to draw in the kind of material that would have been used in creating their clothes and try to represent the stitches connecting the fabric." In contrast to crewmembers of the battleship Silvana who wear modern and utilitarian uniforms, other characters wear traditionally aristocratic attire. High amount of attention was given to character animation. Animators especially experienced difficulties with Alex Row's hair and flowing cape.

Production of Last Exile relied heavily on 3D computer animation. Of the 350 shots used in the first episode, more than 200 included computer-generated animation. In comparison, Gonzo's previous work, Vandread, used an average of 40 to 50 computer-generated shots per episode. Animation was also supplemented with Victorian era flourishes. In order to combine hand-drawn animation with computer-generated ones, the production team used a technique for non-photorealistic rendering, which could not be used for Blue Submarine No. 6 because of a stylistic conflict. At the 2003 Anime Expo, Maeda, who also worked with Studio Ghibli's production of Castle in the Sky, commented that "[Last Exile] is very advanced in how it will incorporate the two mediums".

=== Historical references ===
Real-world historical designs were also adapted for the fictional world. Flying battleships of the Anatoray and Disith nations included components of Japanese dreadnoughts in commission at the turn of the twentieth century. Uniform designs for Anatoray's musketeers were based on Napoleon Bonaparte's army and American Civil War soldiers. On the other hand, Soviet Red Army fur coats provided the basis for Disith uniforms. Another inspiration for creators came from a silent film of the airship Hindenburg, which depicted the aircraft's UFO-like silver-plated design in contrast to the traditional buildings below. This imagery was reproduced in the series.

Producers selected a specific historical time frame to serve as a point of reference.

We had this image of Germany at the beginning of the twentieth century. We thought that Germany of the interwar period had very interesting characteristics. People think of something of dark and negative because of the rise of the Nazism. But so much of things appeared at that time, like a rapid growth of the cities and richness. Industrial technology, chemistry, scientific discoveries, much of inventions also in the design. Bauhaus appears there, for example. [...] I think that all that Germany produced at that time was extreme and unique.

— Mahiro Maeda, interview in Geneon Entertainment's volume 1 compilation DVD of Last Exile

Several characters were also named after historical figures. The name of Claus Valca's father was derived from Hamilcar Barca, the leading commander of Carthaginian forces during the First Punic War and father of the talented tactician Hannibal. An Anatoray general was named after Vitellius, who led the Roman Empire for several months during the Year of the Four Emperors.

== Media ==
=== Anime ===
Last Exile premiered in Japan on April 8, 2003, and aired on TV Tokyo until the airing of its final episode on September 30. A total of 13 DVD compilations were released by Victor Entertainment from July 23, 2003, to July 21, 2004. A complete seven-disc boxed set was released on November 21, 2004. The deluxe edition of this set included a model of Tatiana's and Alister's red vanship, a short story on the fictional Battle of Otranto; (Note: In episode 11, "Develop", Vincent Alzey reveals that he and Alex Row once served together in the Anatoray military during the Battle of Otranto.) unpublished articles on the series, and illustrations by character designer Range Murata.

Pioneer Entertainment (later Geneon Entertainment) licensed the series in June 2003, two months after the first episode aired in Japan; and the first compilation DVD was released on November 18. TechTV premiered the series in English during its Anime Unleashed programming block on March 8, 2004. The first thirteen episodes aired nightly until March 14; and remaining episodes premiered on December 6 after channel was merged into G4techTV, with new episodes airing each weeknight until the series concluded on December 22. All 26 episodes were also aired in a marathon broadcast on Christmas Day. AZN Television and G4techTV Canada also broadcast the series in 2007. After Geneon ceased distribution of its licensed titles in North America, rights to the series were transferred to Funimation; and a four-disc boxed set was released on May 5, 2009; and again on June 14, 2011, under the "Anime Classics" line.

ADV Films originally owned the license for the series' English release in the United Kingdom until its parent company's shutdown in 2009. It was then relicensed by Manga Entertainment, while distribution rights in Australia and New Zealand are owned by Madman Entertainment. Last Exile is also licensed for regional language release in France; Germany; Sweden; Russia; and Taiwan. It has been hosted at the streaming media website Crunchyroll.

On February 1, 2011, Gonzo revealed that a new Last Exile anime was planned titled Last Exile -Fam, the Silver Wing-; described as "a new series of Last Exile [with] new story, [main] characters, and mechanical designs." Koichi Chigira and Hitomi Kuroishi returned to direct and score the anime, respectively. The series aired in Japan from October 15, 2011, to March 24, 2012, and was also simulcasted on the same day in Asia by Animax Asia, making it the fifth anime to be simulcasted the same time as its Japanese premiere on the channel, after Tears to Tiara, Fullmetal Alchemist: Brotherhood, Inuyasha: The Final Act, and Maid Sama!. Funimation licensed the series for streaming and home video release and simulcast the series as it aired. A film adaptation of the series, titled Last Exile: Fam, the Silver Wing: Over the Wishes, was released in theaters on February 6, 2016. The film recompiles the events of the television series with some newly animated footage.

=== Soundtracks ===
Two pieces of theme music were used for the series. "Cloud Age Symphony", performed by Shuntaro Okino, was used as the opening theme for all 26 episodes. It was released by Victor Entertainment as a maxi single on May 21, 2003, and remained on the Oricon music charts for six weeks, where it peaked at 52nd position. Hitomi Kuroishi's "Over the Sky" was used as the ending theme. Music trio Dolce Triade, which includes Kuroishi, produced two CD soundtracks for the series. Last Exile O.S.T. was released by Victor Entertainment on June 21, 2003, and remained on the Oricon music charts for seven weeks, where it peaked at 52nd position. It includes both theme songs and 17 additional instrumental tracks. The second soundtrack, Last Exile O.S.T. 2 was released on September 3, 2003, and remained on the Oricon music charts for five weeks, where it peaked at 55th position. It includes an alternate version of the ending theme song and 19 additional instrumental tracks.

Geneon Entertainment licensed both soundtracks for release in North America. The first soundtrack was released on February 17, 2004; and the second was released on April 13. Both soundtracks are out of print in North America after Geneon ceased production of its licensed titles in 2007.

=== Art book ===
A 136-page art book titled Last Exile Aerial Log, was released in February 2005. It was published in Japanese and was never translated for English-language release. The book contains detailed character sketches and descriptions as well as technical manuals for aircraft that appeared in the series. It also includes exclusive interviews with members of the production staff.

=== Manga ===
There are two manga series published in Japan. The first, is an adaptation of Last Exile: Fam, the Silver Wing written by Gonzo and illustrated by Robo Miyamoto, serialized in Young Ace magazine and published by Kadokawa. The second, titled Last Exile – Travelers from the Hourglass (ラストエグザイル – 砂時計の旅人, Rasuto Eguzairu – Sunadokei no Ryojin), tells what happened to the Claus and his friends after the events of Last Exile and before the events of Last Exile: Fam, the Silver Wing. The manga was written by Gonzo and illustrated by Minoru Murao, one of the original animators of the Last Exile anime. Last Exile – Travelers from the Hourglass was serialized in Newtype Ace and published by Kadokawa.

=== Live-action film ===
On February 11, 2005, a report on Anime News Network mentioned a possible live-action Last Exile film. It was based on a blog post by Patrick Macias, writer for Animerica and author of several books on Japanese pop culture and anime, which noted that while he was attending the Tokyo International Anime Fair, a Gonzo employee suggested that an unnamed New Line Cinema producer was interested in adapting the series for a live-action production. (Note: In his blog post, Macias quoted Arthur Smith, president of Gonzo's parent company GDH International: "Joel Silver is not looking at Last Exile as far as I know…although that would be great. There is, however, a producer who works with New Line who is looking into two of our titles for live action adaptation…Last Exile and Burst Angel.") On July 8, 2009, a concept art image was leaked on the Internet but was removed at the request of filmmakers. However, as of 2026, there has been no new news about the film.

== Reception ==
After receiving a respectable amount of attention in the United States, the series was licensed to Pioneer Entertainment (later Geneon Entertainment) in June 2003, only two months after the first episode aired in Japan. It received numerous praises for its artwork and production, placing it as one of Gonzo's best work. By integrating music and sounds of a European theme, the soundtrack contributed to the series' unique flavor. Divers Allen of Anime News Network gave it an A, and describes the series as "Last Exile is filled with breathtaking scenery, non-stop action and intriguing characters that will keep even the most casual anime fans glued to the edge of their seats. It is a stunning series that leaves viewers craving for more, it continues to shine as a TV series that has the production values of a theatrical animated film. A visual masterpiece with the story to back it up".

Last Exile has been likened to Hayao Miyazaki's classic work Nausicaä of the Valley of the Wind and the early steampunk novel trilogy A Nomad of the Time Streams.

Enoch Lau of THEM Anime Reviews gave the anime series 5 out of 5 stars. Lau praised the series for its great story, outstanding animation and characters. Saying that "resembling something from Miyazaki more than Gonzo, Last Exile looks different. From the faces of the characters down to the stylings of the battleships, it evokes a classic feel but all the while look entirely new. The vanships and battleships are rendered in CG, and so are the myriad of battle effects and the plot is quite solid and intriguing. Last Exile has one of the most interesting settings that I have come across in recent anime. It is a time of war, and chivalry dictates how the opposing forces battle. But instead of using horses and chariots, they use battleships". When Geneon's compilation DVDs were released, reviewers such as IGN praised them despite the use of Dolby Digital 2.0 audio mix over a 5.1 mix. "The separation is masterfully taken care of with voices, music, and sound effects leveled off very cleanly for both the Japanese and English audio tracks." In an interview with director Koichi Chigira given in July 2004, he was surprised to find that the series had reached a great level of popularity among fans in the United States.

TechTV vice president Laura Civiello stated that Last Exile "had more universal appeal than other types of anime shown on the network, which often contained lots of references recognizable only by hard-core fans." When the series premiered on the network, The New York Times recommended it for young audience as well with the headline "An Anime Marathon, and It is Not Just for Adults." The network moved its Anime Unleashed programming block into prime time to take advantage of the quality of the series; eventually launching it into a top ten position on the Nielsen VideoScan anime survey in the middle of 2004. Sony Pictures Entertainment selected Last Exile, Blood+, Gankutsuou: The Count of Monte Cristo, and R.O.D the TV as part of its promotional campaign throughout 2007 and 2008 targeting a bigger audience. It streamed the four series throughout Europe, Latin America, and other parts of Asia on Animax and Animax Asia through various 3G mobile phone services.

The Encyclopedia of Science Fiction notes that "Despite the lackluster sequel, Last Exile was one of the most original anime of the early 2000s, and remains one of the most memorable Steampunk/Dieselpunk anime to date: well-written, visually distinctive, and strong on worldbuilding".
