= List of Cyborg 009 characters =

This is a list of fictional characters appearing in the Cyborg 009 manga by Shotaro Ishinomori and its adaptations.

== Protagonists ==
=== 00 Cyborgs ===
- Joe Shimamura (島村ジョー, Shimamura Jō) – Cyborg 009 (Japan)

The main protagonist. Cyborg 009, formerly Joe Shimamura, is considered the most advanced of the nine 00-Number Cyborgs, possessing the most refined cyborg body of the team. He possesses superhuman strength, durability, and agility, and has mechanical lungs that allow him to breathe underwater. His most prominent ability is Acceleration Mode (加速装置, Kasoku Sōchi), the power to temporarily move at a speed so fast that everything else looks like a statue to him, which is triggered by a switch embedded in one of his molars. In Acceleration Mode, Joe must take care touching or moving anything, as the extreme air friction causes inanimate objects to rapidly heat up and burn and living beings can be seriously injured or killed. Additionally, repeated use of Acceleration Mode in a short period tires him out. During Conclusion: GOD'S WAR, 001 unlocks his latent psychic abilities, granting him teleportation.

Joe is originally from Japan, although he is actually half-Japanese. His unseen father was presumably a soldier in the US Army stationed in Japan after World War II. A delinquent youth who was shunned by his peers because he was a hāfu, he escaped from a juvenile detention facility before being captured by Black Ghost. In the 2001 anime, his mother dies on the steps of a Catholic church in Kanazawa soon after giving birth to him. The priest takes him in as an orphan, where he grows up alongside his fellow orphans and friends Mary Onodera, Shin'ichi Ibaraki, and Masaru Oyamada. When he turned 18, his mentor was killed by Black Ghost, with the organization taking orphans to use in their cyborg experiments. Joe was wrongfully blamed, being captured by Black Ghost while he is on the run from the police. In the 1960 and 1980 film versions, Joe was a famous racer, nicknamed "Hurricane Joe", who gets into a crash and is recovered by Black Ghost (similar to 004's origin), who then adds several body enhancements during the process of being turned into a cyborg. He generally acts as the field leader of the team, directing them in combat with 001 and Dr. Gilmore's guidance.

- Ivan Whisky (イワン·ウイスキー, Iwan Uisukī) – Cyborg 001 (Soviet Union)

Originally from the Soviet Union, infant Ivan Whisky, known as Ivan Asimov in the English dub of the 2001 anime, was born with a severe brain illness. His father, famous brain surgeon Gamo Whisky, was driven to madness trying to cure his son, performing numerous experimental brain enhancement processes. These procedures granted Ivan a mental capacity far exceeding that of a normal human. Ivan's mother Erika protested the enhancement procedures, which led to Gamo murdering her in his madness. Ivan's enhanced brain gives him several psychic powers, including, telepathy, telekinesis, and extrasensory perception. However, using his abilities to any significant degree quickly tires out his infant body. This causes him to sleep for several days at a time in order to recover his energy. It is implied in some continuities that, because of his cyborg enhancements, Ivan will never physically age and will remain an infant for the rest of his life.

When Gamo abandoned Ivan to Black Ghost, Ivan was further modified and designated Cyborg 001, replacing Jet Link, who instead became 002. He was one of the 00 Cyborgs who were cryogenically frozen until more advanced technology and procedures were developed. While still a pacifier-sucking infant, he is talented in scientific analysis and can telepathically converse at an adult level.

- Jet Link (ジェット·リンク, Jetto Rinku) – Cyborg 002 (United States)

Unmistakable with his swept-back hair, confident smile and longer-than-real-life nose, Jet has thrusters built into his feet, allowing him to fly at speeds of up to Mach 5. Jet is also equipped with a prototype Acceleration Mode module, though it is not as powerful as the refined model that was installed in 009, so 002 only uses it in desperate circumstances. During Conclusion: GOD'S WAR, 001 unlocks 002's latent psychic abilities, allowing him to fly at the speed of light. In 009 Re:Cyborg, 002 has a more outwardly cybernetic body, featuring thrusters on his back and legs as well as flight control surfaces on his body to assist in high speed and high altitude flight.

In the 2001 anime continuity, Jet was originally 001, but was replaced by Ivan. He is one of the four original 00-Cyborgs cryogenically frozen until more advanced technology was available, though he notably was the only one of the original four who did not experience any adverse side-effects from his cybernetic parts. Jet comes from New York City in the United States and was the leader of a street gang on Manhattan's West Side. His character is introduced in both the manga and the anime holding his own in a fight with a rival gang; when the police appeared he was aided by nearby Black Ghost members who offered to take him away from the scene. Rendered unconscious, he was eventually brought to the organization's scientific headquarters to be unwillingly made into a cyborg. Brash and stubborn, 002 often comes into conflict with his teammates because of his hot-headedness, but is otherwise a loyal and good-hearted teammate.

- Françoise Arnoul (フランソワーズ·アルヌール, Furansowāzu Arunūru) – Cyborg 003 (France)

The only female member of the team, 003 has enhanced vision and hearing, allowing her to see through walls and sense objects an enormous distance away, Through her experiences with the group, she also becomes an excellent pilot, technician, and mechanic. During Conclusion: GOD'S WAR, 001 unlocks her latent psychic abilities and grants her clairvoyance, precognition, and telepathy.

Françoise was originally a ballet dancer from France. Her brother Jean (Jean-Paul in the English dub), a member of the French Air Force returning to Paris on a one-week leave, was to meet Françoise at the train station. However, she was kidnapped by Black Ghost operatives, despite repeated attempts by her brother to save her along the way. In the 2001 anime series, Black Ghost offers a fake professional dancing career so they can kidnap her. 003 rarely fights, lacking the same combat ability as most of her companions, and is often seen either directing missions under Gilmore's guidance or caring for 001. She was one of the 00 Cyborgs who were frozen until more advanced technology and procedures were developed. As such, she is chronologically in her 50s, being 19 when captured. Among the 00 Cyborg team, she and Joe are closest, having a budding romantic relationship by the end.

- Albert Heinrich (アルベルト·ハインリヒ, Aruberuto Hainrihi) – Cyborg 004 (East Germany)

Albert was originally from East Germany (specifically, East Berlin). He and his fiancée, Hilda attempted to escape to West Berlin in the guise of circus performers. When Albert forgot to retrieve his forged identification from a guard, he panicked and sped off. The border guards opened fire on the truck, severely injuring Albert and killing Hilda. Black Ghost agents arrived on the scene and lied to Albert, telling him they would take him to a hospital.

004 often has a gruff exterior which belies his friendly personality and disgust with war, and he is also a skilled combat tactician. He was the last of the 00 Cyborgs who were frozen until more advanced technology and procedures were made and is chronologically the oldest of the group, being 30 years old when captured. The severity of his injuries also resulted in him receiving the most extensive and most outwardly apparent cyborg modifications, with it being mentioned in the 2001 series that his only remaining organic parts are his brain and spinal cord. 004 is also the most heavily armed member of the team, with multiple weapons hidden throughout his body. The fingertips on his visibly artificial right hand conceal machine gun barrels, his left hand hides a laser knife, and he has missiles hidden in his knees. In some continuities, it is implied he may also have a nuclear bomb in his abdomen. In the movie 009 Re:Cyborg, he mentions that his weapons are difficult to resupply because they were custom-made for his body. During Conclusion: GOD'S WAR, 001 unlocks 004's latent psychic abilities, granting him the power to guide his machine gun hand's bullets with telekinesis, also coating the bullets with psychic energy and increasing their power. In the 2001 series, upon waking up as a cyborg, Albert was horrified at how he was now a "weapon", which was aggravated by the side effects of his modifications causing him additional physical pain and strain. This ultimately forced Black Ghost to halt the cyborg program for decades, and put the existing cyborgs in suspended animation until technology developed sufficiently to make future cyborg soldiers more stable.

- Geronimo Jr. (ジェロニモ·ジュニア, Jeronimo Junia) – Cyborg 005 (United States)

Geronimo Junior, also called "G-Junior" for short, was originally from an undisclosed part of the southwest United States. G-Junior is a Native American who was unable to find work because of widespread racism. He was approached to be a Native American chief in a sideshow, but G-Junior simply punched the sideshow owner in the face, refusing to further the stereotypes about his culture. Black Ghost agents overheard the conversation and offered G-Junior a job far from home. G-Junior accepted, admitting that he really had no home anymore. In the 2001 anime series, he was instead a freelance construction worker bribed into accepting a very promising job offer by disguised Black Ghost agents. 005 was the first created when Black Ghost resumed its cyborg soldier program.

The largest of the 00 Number Cyborgs, 005 possesses immense strength and armored skin, able to lift and toss objects like large boulders with ease. In contrast to his hulking appearance and power, he is a quiet, reserved man with a deep reverence for nature and life. In some continuities, it is implied that he may have a sort of sixth sense that allows him to sense changes in nature and possibly other people's thoughts that does not originate from his cyborg implants. During Conclusion: GOD'S WAR, 001 unlocks 005's latent psychic power, granting him even greater strength.

- Chang Changku (張々湖, Chanchanko) – Cyborg 006 (China)

Chang was originally from China. He was an impoverished Chinese farmer who once owned a pig farm. One day, almost all of his pigs ran away and he was starving and suffering under heavy taxes. Hopeless, Chang decided to end his misery by hanging himself, but was "saved" by a bullet from Black Ghost which cut the noose. Chang fainted and was later delivered to the Black Ghost laboratory. In the 2001 series, he owned a restaurant, thus explaining why he is such a good cook, but accidentally burned it down after drunkenly doing a fire-breathing trick, which resulted in him losing everything. Black Ghost agents then abducted him after he fainted from the shock. He is a jovial fellow who is well-versed in the ways of cooking; his refined cuisine and happy personality always manage to bring his teammates back to good spirits. After Black Ghost's apparent defeat, Chang opens a Chinese restaurant in Tokyo, employing his teammate 007 as a sous-chef. He is frequently partnered with 007 on missions, with the two constantly bickering.

Chang's power allows him to breathe huge flames, which burn hot enough to melt rock, allowing him to tunnel underground. He also frequently uses his flames in cooking. During Conclusion: GOD'S WAR, 001 unlocks 006's latent psychic powers, enhancing his abilities to grant him full pyrokinesis.

- "Great Britain" (グレート·ブリテン, Gurēto Buriten) – Cyborg 007 (United Kingdom)

007 has the ability to reshape his cellular structure at will, allowing him to take the form of any object, creature, or person he wishes when he presses a button in his navel. With his superb acting skills, he can also blend in with the enemy to use sneaky maneuvers and attacks. During Conclusion: GOD'S WAR, 001 enhances 007's abilities to allow him to possess others and use astral projection. 007's abilities make him a master of infiltration/espionage and by morphing into a dangerous animal or gigantic form he can also be very useful in field combat.

The man going by the stage name "Great Britain" was originally from the United Kingdom. He was once a famous and talented stage actor with a broad knowledge of theatre and a weakness for alcohol. In the 2001 TV series, Great Britain (simply known by the initials G.B. in the English dub) was in love with his colleague Sophie. Later he became more famous and gradually ignored his past love. One financial problem after another arose, and the once great thespian was reduced over time to a penniless nobody who would do anything for a drink or a smoke. Black Ghost agents, noticing his plight, easily lured Great Britain into their vehicle with an alcoholic beverage. Later when he escapes with the other cyborgs he returns to the United Kingdom and finds out that his ex-girlfriend had a daughter, Rosa. With the possibility that she might be his child, Great Britain tries to talk to her but is rejected and scorned for his past actions with Rosa believing him to have betrayed Sophie, to be redeemed only in the end when he replaces a main actor in a production of The Mists of London, a play he once acted in alongside Sophie, and manages to give them both closure. Great Britain is outwardly a lighthearted and amiable man who always tries to defuse tension between his teammates with a joke, but has lingering doubts and regrets about his past, being prone to serious introspection and using lines from theatrical roles to relate to a situation. Giving credence to his personality as a comic relief, there is a running gag where Great Britain often takes the form of a precocious, almost super deformed, spoiled child fearing for his own life. Of his team members, he is closest to 006, with the two frequently seen partnered together and forming a comedic duo.

In the 1960s anime versions, he is a child rather than an adult, in an attempt by the producers to appeal to a younger audience. Though Ishinomori initially disapproved of this, he later temporarily mirrored it in the manga version by having Gilmore alter 007's body to make the child form his standard form in a one-shot titled "The Man in the High Castle" (though this change was quickly discarded soon after).

- Pyunma (ピュンマ) – Cyborg 008 (Kenya)

Pyunma, the only member of the team with prior combat training, has mechanical lungs that allow him to survive indefinitely underwater as well as thrusters built into his feet that allow him to swim at great speeds. During Conclusion: GOD'S WAR, 001 unlocks 008's latent psychic abilities and grants him the power of hydrokinesis. Pyunma is also the primary pilot of the Dolphin, the team's flying battleship.

Pyunma is originally from Kenya. Originally, Pyunma was to have been made a slave along with the people of his tribe, but he escaped from his chains and ran off. Cornered by the slave drivers, all seemed lost until the slave drivers were shot dead by Black Ghost agents from out of nowhere. Holding Pyunma at gunpoint, they led him to their plane so he could be taken to the cybernetics laboratory. In the 2001 series, Pyunma was a guerilla fighter from the fictional African nation of Muamba who fought against the tyrant ruling his land along with his friends Kabore and Mamado. During one battle, he was caught in the crossfire and was taken by Black Ghost in the chaos. Pyunma is a serious fighter and decision-maker when the situation demands it. His talents include guerrilla-style land maneuvers plus undersea recon and demolition. Near the end of the 2001 series, Pyunma is grievously injured in battle. Dr. Gilmore, out of a misguided desire to make Pyunma stronger, rebuilds him with silver-scaled fishlike skin, which dramatically decreases his water resistance and allows him to swim even faster than before. Pyunma is initially horrified by his new appearance, believing he has lost his humanity, but after a talk with 004 he accepts it and even gives his new parts an effective and ingenious use in a fight. In the original 1960s and 1970s incarnations, Pyuma's body design was inspired in the darky iconography of older American cartoons. This is in contrast to the seriousness of the character's no-nonsense, battle-trained personality. In the 80s movie Chou Ginga Densetsu, Pyunma was redesigned as less caricatured and more naturalistic; this same revamped design was updated for the 2001 series.

=== Humans ===
- Dr. Isaac Gilmore (アイザック·ギルモア博士, Aizakku Girumoa Hakase) (Soviet Union)

The lead scientist in the 00 Cyborg program, Dr. Gilmore was a dutiful worker who hid a deep distrust for Black Ghost's plans. In the 2001 series, he begins doubting Black Ghost once his superiors insist on installing a low quality artificial heart into 005's body simply because it was cheaper, turning a deaf ear to Dr. Gilmore's protests. After that point, he became less involved in the 00 Cyborg program. After the cybernetic enhancements for the first nine 00 Cyborgs were complete, he intentionally let himself be "taken hostage" by the cyborgs. Since then, he has been the team's advisor and father figure, not only helping to formulate the team's plans but also assisting them with the nuances of their newfound mechanical bodies.

In the 1979 series it is revealed that he and fellow scientist Reinhardt was captured and forced to work on Operation Superman (possibly the first cyborg project ever) for the Nazi regime during the 1940s. Gilmore, when he learned that he was working on Hitler's secret project, was disgusted by this fact and decided to escape. He was aided by the chaos created by an Allied strike on the laboratory he was working in and managed to escape in the confusion.

- Dr. Kozumi (コズミ博士, Kozumi Hakase) (Japan)

Calm and perceptive Kozumi is Gilmore's old friend from before he joined Black Ghost, and is also a doctor specialized in biochemistry (it is hinted he may be even on the Nobel Prize level). His mansion in the outskirts of Tokyo became the cyborg's HQ during the first episodes; Kozumi not only helped develop the antidote for a poison that affected the cyborgs, but also aided 004 when he was starting to doubt himself again, and was the first person to notice how Gilmore and the cyborgs were becoming more of a family than merely a group of fighters. He was kidnapped by Black Ghost, and the cyborgs had to rescue him by fighting and defeating 0012 and 0013; after that, he remained a good friend of the team.

=== Voice casts ===
Character	Appearances											
Character	Movies 1 & 2	1968 Anime	1979 Radio	1979 Anime	Movie 3	Sega CD Game	2001 Anime	2009 Radio	2009 Event	Movie 4	Cyborg 009 vs Devilman	Cyborg 009: Call Of Justice
009 / Joe Shimamura	Hiroyuki Ōta	Katsuji Mori	Akira Kamiya	Kazuhiko Inoue	Kazuhiko Inoue	Kazuhiko Inoue	Takahiro Sakurai	Takeshi Kusao	Hiroshi Kamiya	Mamoru Miyano	Jun Fukuyama	Keisuke Koumoto
001 / Ivan Whiskey	Kyōko Toriyama	Fuyumi Shiraishi	Sachiko Chijimatsu	Sachiko Chijimatsu	Fuyumi Shiraishi	Fuyumi Shiraishi	Kana Ueda	Miwa Katsue	Toshiko Fujita	Sakiko Tamagawa	Haruka Shiraishi	Misato Fukuen
002 / Jet Link	Ryō Ishihara	Ryō Ishihara	Kazuyuki Sogabe	Keiichi Noda	Keiichi Noda	Keiichi Noda	Showtaro Morikubo	Hideyuki Hori	Ryōtarō Okiayu	Daisuke Ono	Tomoaki Maeno	Takuya Satō
003 / Francoise Arnoul	Judy Ongg	Hiroko Suzuki	Kazuko Sugiyama	Kazuko Sugiyama	Kazuko Sugiyama	Kazuko Sugiyama	Satsuki Yukino	Machiko Toyoshima	Hōko Kuwashima	Chiwa Saitō	MAO	Risa Taneda
004 / Albert Heinrich	Hiroshi Ōtake	Hiroshi Ōtake→ Kenji Utsumi	Shunsuke Shima	Keaton Yamada	Keaton Yamada	Keaton Yamada	Nobuo Tobita	Nobutoshi Canna	Kazuya Nakai	Tōru Ōkawa	Hiroki Tōchi	Satoshi Hino
005 / Geronimo Junior	Hiroshi Masuoka	Hiroshi Masuoka	Ryūsuke Shiomi	Banjō Ginga	Banjō Ginga		Akio Ōtsuka	Ryūzaburō Ōtomo	Hisao Egawa	Teruyuki Tanzawa	Tsuyoshi Koyama	Kenji Nomura
006 / Chang Changku	Arihiro Fujimura	Ichirō Nagai	Masayuki Yuhara	Sanji Hase	Sanji Hase		Chafūrin	Kōzō Shioya	Naoki Tatsuta	Tarō Masuoka	Yū Mizushima	Mitsuaki Madono
007 / Great Britain	Machiko Soga	Machiko Soga	Kaneta Kimotsuki	Kaneta Kimotsuki	Kaneta Kimotsuki		Yūichi Nagashima	Keiichi Nanba	Masaya Onosaka	Hiroyuki Yoshino	Hozumi Gōda	Setsuji Satō
008 / Pyunma	Kenji Utsumi	Keiichi Noda	Toyokazu Minami	Kōji Totani	Kazuyuki Sogabe		Mitsuo Iwata	Toshio Furukawa	Hikaru Midorikawa	Noriaki Sugiyama	Ayumu Okamura	Haruki Ishiya
Dr. Isaac Gilmore	Jōji Yanami	Jōji Yanami	Hitoshi Takagi	Kōsei Tomita	Jōji Yanami	Jōji Yanami	Mugihito	Takeshi Aono	Chikao Ōtsuka	Nobuyuki Katsube	Shigeru Ushiyama	Ryō Sugisaki

== Antagonists ==
=== Skull/Black Ghost ===
Skull (スカール, Sukāru) – called Black Ghost in certain versions and also known as Skarle or Sekar, is the tyrannical leader of an evil organization called Black Ghost, who manipulate world events from the shadows in order to profit off selling weapons and cyborgs in endless wars. His true identity is not known because he wears a skull-shaped mask and full-body suit that resembles a skeleton. A possible origin for him exists in the 2007 anime adaptation of The Skull Man in which main character Hayato is revived and takes up an appearance almost exactly like that of Skull. Hayato is also implied to be Joe Shimamura's father, though this is never confirmed.

Skull is seemingly defeated when the 00 cyborgs enter a Black Ghost base they originally believe is Black Ghost's HQ and set explosives, leaving 009 and Skull to fight one-on-one. It is revealed that Skull is also a cyborg with far greater abilities to the 00 cyborgs, soundly defeating 009 using his superior Acceleration Mode. Only a last-ditch effort managed to save the nine cyborgs as Skull plummeted to his apparent death.

Skull later returns, though is not known how he survived the explosion. In a battle with 009, it is shown that the only remaining organic part of Skull's body is his brain, which is implanted in his chest cavity. Soon after, it is revealed that he is not the true leader of Black Ghost, but is subordinate to three brains who are the apparent true leaders. Although the brains were destroyed in the end, they claim to be only one "cell" of the Black Ghost organization and that Black Ghost will exist as long there is evil in men's hearts.

=== Van Vogt ===
Alternately known as Claus van Bogoot in the English dub of the 2001 series, Van Vogt is a top executive of Black Ghost who uses the organization's power to enslave the Pu'Awak people in the underground Yomi Kingdom. He is a powerful cyborg with many advanced abilities, including Acceleration Mode, the ability to absorb and channel energy, extendable limbs, and an invisibility suit. He is a sadistic man who delights in suffering, seeing human lives as disposable assets. He kidnaps and converts 009's childhood friends into cyborg assassins, implanting a bomb in each one that he quickly detonates the moment they hesitate in trying to kill 009.

=== Cyborg Assassins ===
- Cyborg 0010 +/- ~ Twin brothers transformed into cyborgs. They are the first assassin cyborgs sent after the heroes. They both possess the ability to channel lightning and are equipped with Acceleration Mode modules that rival 009's own. Their weakness lies in their opposite polarities: one brother being positive (0010+), the other negative (0010-): should they come into contact, they would annihilate each other. It is this which leads to their eventual downfall, an event caused by 001 and 009. Their ability to channel electricity shorts out if they are doused in water. However, they may still use their electrical attacks as long as they work in tandem and one remains dry.
- Cyborg 0011 – A cyborg in the form of an enormous black, spider-like machine. The machine contains the brain of an ordinary man who was kidnapped by Black Ghost and was promised that he would be returned to his human body and reunited with his family if he can defeat the 00-Number Cyborgs. After learning this, 004 tries to convince him to change sides and almost succeeds, but after 0011 falls into the sea and attempts to rebel against Black Ghost, his machine body's programming takes over and focuses only on defeating the cyborgs. He fires lasers and sticky goop from holes in his sides and he can release a toxic rain cloud that poisons even cyborgs. He is defeated by 004, who manages to shoot him in his weak spot reluctantly.
- Cyborg 0012 – A beautiful woman who is actually a cyborg mansion. She was once a rich, noble-born foreigner who lived, and eventually died, waiting for her husband, who died in World War I. Eventually, she is found by Black Ghost and her abandoned mansion is converted into a cyborg deathtrap with her original body and brain linked to the mansion's systems via a cryogenic pod. She controls everything in the house and can use a hologram of her original body to communicate with her victims. 007 is at first smitten with her and even after learning she is a killer cyborg, still holds sympathy for her and tries to help her, only to be shunned. She is defeated by 004, 007, and 009.
- Cyborg 0013 – A normally gentle and kind-hearted cyborg in the shape of a pudgy boy in his mid-to-late teens. Even though he works for Black Ghost, he kills many of the assassins who are supposed to assist him, refuses to kill an old friend of Dr. Gilmore who has been taken hostage, and even helps 009 to save a little girl caught in the crossfire. His cyborg abilities include telepathy and an Acceleration Mode module that is more advanced than 009's. His primary ability, however, is his psychic link to a giant robot that can become invisible. After he is defeated by 009, 0013 decides to kill himself by destroying the robot, believing that was the only way to escape from Black Ghost's control. Before he dies, he asks what 009's real name is; 009 answers and asks the same to 0013, but 0013 dies before he can answer. 009 keeps the wooden rabbit figurine 0013 gives him as a memento.
- Cyborg -004 – Appearing exclusively in the 2001 series, -004 is a completely robotic duplicate of 004 presumably built by Black Ghost and equipped with the same weaponry as 004 as well as a predictive program that can anticipate 004's moves. -004 is defeated when it launches a missile that nearly strikes a bird's nest. The robot's program anticipates that 004 would simply dodge the missile, but he instead moves to save the bird's nest, confusing -004 and leaving it open to attack and ultimately defeat.
- Fake Gilmore – A robotic duplicate of Dr. Gilmore that periodically harasses 004 during the battle with his robotic duplicate. The fake Gilmore tries to make 004 doubt himself by claiming he is nothing more than a machine and living weapon, but 004 easily deduces it isn't the real Gilmore by insisting he would never say those things.
- Shinichi, Masaru, and Mary – Joe's childhood friends from his days at the orphanage, they reunite with him as the 00 Cyborgs are investigating Black Ghost returning. In truth, Van Vogt has forcefully turned them into cyborg assassins meant to defeat 009, also having bombs implanted in their bodies to force their obedience. Shinichi's chest and arms are lined with holes containing machine guns. Masaru has several large tusks jutting from his shoulders and torso that can grab and crush. Mary's body has been converted into a quadrupedal, catlike form and she can call upon cyborg beasts with her howls.

=== Humans ===
- Dr. Gamo Whiskey (ガモ·ウィスキー博士, Gamo Wisukī Hakase) – 001's father, an ex-brain surgeon who went mad after not being able to nurse his seriously ill child back to health, and gave him up to Black Ghost. When the Psychic Assassins came, he was retired, old, and very, very wrinkled; he pretended to sympathize with their plea, but erases their memories and makes them Black Ghost's puppets, determined to get 001 back and settle his old scores with his former rival, Isaac Gilmore. he is ultimately killed by Phil, who uses his powers to give him a heart attack; still, he manages to make peace with Ivan just before dying. He was renamed Dr. Gamo Asimov in the Sony Pictures English dub.
- Dr. Gaia (ガイア博士, Gaia Hakase) – He is the man who created the Greek God Cyborgs and a former Black Ghost scientist. In the manga, he works with Dr. Uranus, another black Ghost scientist, and is far more interested in destroying the rebels and Gilmore. While Uranus tries to peacefully sort things out with Gilmore, hoping that he will simply give up his cyborgs or, later on, make peace with the Greek god cyborgs, Dr. Gaia planned to use sneaky maneuvers and tactics to attack Gilmore and the 00-team when they were not expecting it. In the anime, he is about the same, minus his rivalry with Uranus and seems to have a grudge against Gilmore, as they thought differently and contested over whether a cyborg's memory should be wiped of the human memories or not. Later on, he killed Artemis for helping 009 and is killed by Apollo when he finds out, shortly after going mad with the power of his overloading machine.

=== Cyborg Men ===
A group of mass-produced cyborg men who help try to spark a war in 008's home country. They wear black suits, which also cover their face with red goggles and an air tube which they appear to need for survival. They usually ride in black tanks. Their leader is Number 1, who is 008's old friend, Mamado. He rides a black saucer with laser shooting tentacles which can detach as robotic snakes. He appears to have lost his good heart after the brainwashing he was put through, so he is defeated by a very reluctant 008 after he fails to convince him. More advanced Cyborg Men are later seen as Van Vogt's footsoldiers.

=== Mythos Cyborgs ===
Beings claiming to be Greek gods who have come to Earth to destroy it, so they may end war and create a more peaceful world. In actuality, they are highly advanced cyborgs created by Dr. Gaia who are unaware of their true nature because of extensive memory alteration. Most of them dress in white Greek clothes with capes and live on a far away island just off the coast of Greece.

- Apollo (アポロン, Aporon; Apollon) – The arrogant and destructive leader of the group, modeled after the Greek god of the sun. He is the younger brother to Artemis and prefers destruction, but is often swayed to a different course of action by his more compassionate sister, whom he dearly loves. He has flaming red hair, his body glows in battle and he rides in a chariot led by two Pegasi. He has the power to create powerful fire attacks, has the power of acceleration, can throw piercing sun-shaped discs from his belt that create blinding light and cause earthquakes and can fire lasers from his fingers. He dies during the island's destruction, but not before killing Gaia out of revenge for his sister's death.
- Minotaur (ミノタウロス, Minotaurosu; Minotauros) – A powerful fighter who serves as Apollo's left hand man and is completely devoted to him. He has a bull's head, blue eyes, a strange mark on his forehead and horns that can fire powerful lightning bolts. He is killed in the destruction of the island.
- Achilles (アキレス, Akiresu) – Another powerful fighter who serves as Apollo's right-hand man. He is a humanoid panther with yellow eyes who carries a long sword and a shield capable of firing powerful energy blasts. He also has an acceleration mode which is activated by the balancers on his shoes. He is defeated by 009 with some help from Pan.
- Poseidon (ポセイドン) – A giant cyborg based on the god of the sea who will destroy anyone in his underwater domain. He is always seen in water and resembles a massive merman with a white beard and fins behind his ears. He appears to be able to stay underwater indefinitely and even control it. He is killed in the destruction of the island.
- Hera (ヘラ) – A cyborg modeled after the queen of the gods and goddess of women who distrusts Artemis's change of heart and views it as a weakness. She has long golden hair in an enormous bun, wears a black tiara, has purple skin, and her eyes glow when she uses her powers. She is a psychic like 001. She is killed in the early stages of the destruction, after a psychic duel with 001.
- Artemis (アルテミス, Arutemisu) – Apollo's beautiful older sister modeled after the goddess of the hunt. She appears to have doubts about killing off the world, although she will do what her duty requires. She is often the voice of reason and dislikes unnecessary violence. Her two companions are Atlas and Pan. She has long, dark blue flowing hair of which a single large lock always covers one of her eyes, with a gold band around her head. She carries a bow which can create powerful energy arrows. She is mortally wounded by Dr. Gaia for helping 009 and being compassionate, but lives long enough to stop Apollo from killing 009 and dies in his arms after warning him about Gaia's treachery.
- Atlas (アトラス, Atorasu) – A constant companion of Artemis, he is a large, green robot with red eyes who towers over all and possesses amazing strength. He is always fighting with Pan over the affection of Artemis. Aside from his strength, he can fire missiles from his chest, shoulders and abdomen. After his mistress's death, he is killed in the destruction of the island.
- Pan (パン) – A small childlike being who is another constant companion of Artemis, for whom he shares great affection. He can not speak but often whimpers and moans. He later grows an affection for 003 when she bandages him up, even helping save her from Achilles. He looks like a young satyr with orange hair and a single horn on his head. He has no special abilities. He is killed in the destruction of the island.
- Nereus (ネレウス, Nereusu) – A strange, anthropomorphic hippo in a red ruff and tutu who is unable to speak and appears to serve no purpose. He seems to lack special abilities of any kind and is cowardly.

=== The Mutant Warriors ===
In the 2001 anime, there is an alternate universe where Black Ghost has won the war against the cyborgs, and the world is in perpetual war. Humans have developed psychic powers of a different variety for self-defense, and even then they live in constant fear.

A young man named Nichol, his girlfriend Rina, Rina's younger brother Phil and their friends Cain and Mii learn that there was peace, and decide to time-travel to search for help. But during their time-jump, they lose sight of Nicholas and arrive, with their life energy completely drained, to the doorstep of Gamo Whisky, Ivan/001's estranged father. Hiding his connections with Black Ghost, he erases the kids' memories and pits them against the cyborgs to retrieve his child, prove his theories about psychic powers right, and defeat his old rival Gilmore's team. After the Warriors turn against a non-brainwashed Nichol and one of them kills him, they fight the cyborgs.

Slowly after each regains their memory, they join the Cyborgs after they rescue 009 and Rina from the future, to fight against Gamo and a treacherous Cain. Gamo is fatally wounded and 001 forgives his father before he dies, since he remembers that Gamo's madness started after he failed to cure Ivan's old birth disease. They each have telepathic abilities, telekinesis, psychic barriers and can teleport at will.

- Nichol (Nicholas in English dub) – Was the only psychic to escape Gamo's brainwashing; during the time-jump the others lost sight of him, so he escaped the treatment. He was Rina's boyfriend. He arrives wounded, to warn the Cyborgs, but is killed by the Psychic Assassins; using their telekinetic powers, one of them lifts him up in the air and snaps his neck in front of the horrified Gilmore, 003, 006, 007 and 009. He has black hair and wears normal clothes, and though he is not seen in action he is assumed to have the same powers as the other Assassins without the de-aging process.
- Rina (Lena in English dub) – She is truly kind at heart and is the first to regain her memory, but then she is sent back with 009 to the future. Her boyfriend is Nichol, and Phil is her younger brother. She has long thick white hair which she lets flow out. She is the first to regain her memory, which is latent in her subconscious mind for a long time, and the recovery is triggered by seeing Nichol's pendant in Joe's hands. This causes her mind to be in sync with 009 which causes her to time-jump with him and fully reject the brainwashing. She disappears in time with Cain during their duel.
- Cain – The only Psychic Assassin who appears to be evil before Gamo's brainwashing, he loves to fight because he enjoys the thrill of possible death, and says that the Cyborgs do not have to worry about him due to his human body. He has the ability to use his psychic powers to speed himself up to keep up with 009's acceleration mode. He has black hair with red tips and a monocle that covers one of his eyes. He is the only one not to in the end join the Cyborgs, and then he tries to destroy the other Assassins. He disappears in time with Rina during their duel, and following his own words he also was the one who killed Nichol.
- Mii (Mai in English dub) – She along with Phil later regains her memory and joins the Cyborgs to go to the future and find Rina and 009. She has purple hair with a very thick fringe. She has the ability Synchro-Warp which allows her to send a group through time as long as their minds are in sync. She is the last Assassin left in the end and she simply fades away since her background has changed. She and Rina also have Telepathic Mimicry in which they can falsely communicate telepathically with another person's voice.
- Phil – He along with Mii later regains her memory and joins the Cyborgs to go to the future and find Rina and 009. He is Rina's little brother and the youngest of the group, because of this he hates being treated as weak and always tries to show his strength. He has green hair and wears a yellowish suit. Being the youngest he also appears to be the most vulnerable to the ageing process that affects the Assassins due to the time-jump. He dies after using his powers to fatally injure Gamo, calling out to his sister.

=== The Yomi Kingdom ===
Deep buried in the Earth's grounds, the Yomi kingdom and its inhabitants, the Pu'Awak, have been enslaved by the dinosaur race known as the Zattan, who treat them as slaves and use their natural fertility to keep them as living food supplies. Black Ghost, or more specifically Skull and his underling Van Vogt (renamed Claus Van Bogoot in the Sony Pictures English dub), suddenly appear to trick the Pu'Awaks into following them to fight for freedom, and they choose 5 Pu'Awak noble-born sisters as their subordinates. The girls (Biina, Helen, Daphne, Aphro and Dinah) are soon disenchanted, and decide to join the Cyborgs instead to reach for true freedom.

- Helen – The first to be seen of the Pu'Awak sisters and the eldest one (but youngest in Sony Pictures' English dub), her tiara had red jewels and she also wears a short blue dress. She had her memories partially erased by Black Ghost and was sent towards the Cyborgs as an unwilling spy, with Biina monitoring her through their psychic link. Sweet-tempered and frail due to her lack of memories, she does not recover until almost the end of the arc, after a brief brainwashing courtesy of the Zattan; overcoming her own fears and shock, Helen guides 009, 001, 002, 003 and 005 to the Yomi Kingdom, saving Biina and 004 from being executed, but later she and her sister die at the hands of Van Vogt and the kingdom collapses in the upcoming fight. 004 treated her harshly in the first episodes since 008 was seriously injured by the dinosaurs released by Black Ghost and Helen's loyalties still were not fully revealed. She grew rather fond of 009; 003 was distraught for this, but tried to not hold it up against Helen herself, and was the one who mourned her the most after she died.
- Biina (Venus in Tokyopop version, Vena in Sony Pictures' English dub) – The second-eldest of the sisters (changed to eldest in the Sony Pictures English dub), she has a tiara with blue jewels and wears a modern outfit with blue pants and shirt, and the leader of the quintet. Through the other girls' eyes, she can see everything that they see serving as a psychic link to relay information to Van Vogt. When Helen is caught in the crossfire and Van Vogt refuses to rescue her, Biina defects and guides the Cyborg team to Yomi. At first, she and 004 dislike each other intensely, but as the story progresses, they learn to understand each other, despite Biina's increasing pessimism about the whole matter. She is later shot to death along with her sisters by Van Vogt and dies in Albert's arms, just like Hilda.
- Dinah (Diana in Tokyopop version) – Third Pu'Awak sister, her tiara has pink jewels. Very quiet and gentle, she manages to make Daphne explain why she betrayed their plan. She also dies after being shot by Van Vogt. Some moments of the English dub refer to her as Deena, due to difficulty with pronouncing her name.
- Aphro – The fourth sister, she wears a white gown and a tiara with green jewels. She rarely speaks, but is very assertive and opinionated. She discovers Daphne's treachery and harshly lectures her, but ends up forgiving her due to Dinah's pleas. She also dies after being shot by Van Vogt.
- Daphne – Fifth and youngest Pu'Awak sister, she has a tiara with purple beads and is the most insecure of the group. She is so distraught about the high failure possibility of her sisters' plans that she betrays them to Van Vogt, leaking info about their alliance with the Cyborgs. After Dinah and Aphro unmask her, she has a change of heart and joins them fully, freeing Gilmore and some of the cyborgs when they are captured by Black Ghost, only to be killed by Van Vogt along with her sisters.

=== High-Teen Number Cyborgs ===
Appearing in Cyborg 009 VS Devilman, the High-Teen Number Cyborgs are a continuation of the 00-Number Cyborg program created by Dr. Adams Teufel, a Black Ghost scientist and a former colleague of Dr. Gilmore whose ultimate goal is to make demon-cyborg hybrids and prove their power to the world.

- Cyborg 0014 / Edward Adams – The leader of the High-Teen Numbers and Dr. Adams Teufel's son. Originally his father's assistant, he was critically injured in a lab accident. As a cyborg, his abilities rival 009's, possessing an identical Acceleration Mode device.
- Cyborg 0015 / Eva Maria Pallares – Miki Makimura's classmate and Seth's sister. Her cyborg enhancements grant her various psychic powers including telekinesis and force fields.
- Cyborg 0016 / John Cain Smith – A silent, towering man with a metal face whose cyborg body parallels 004's, being packed with hidden weapons.
- Cyborg 0017 / Abel – A young boy with cryokinetic abilities.
- Cyborg 0018 / Seth – Eva's twin brother who was converted into a cyborg to act as an ideal host body for the demon Atun. After fusing with Atun, he becomes Azazel, possessing energy manipulation powers.

== Others ==
- Cynthia Findor (Cynthia Findoru in English dub). Daughter of a scientist who was forced to work for Black Ghost.
- Princess Ixquic. A lonely and ancient android shaped as a beautiful songstress, who guards a golden pyramid in the Andes along with a blood-thirsty robot named Cabrakan. She is not evil, though; actually, Ixquic longs for company but is not allowed to meet other people, since the pyramid must be hidden from the world. She and the pyramid can only be seen when the wind blows through a rock portal in the mountain, yet every time Ixquic is given the chance to interact with humans, they try to steal the treasures sealed in the place, so Cabrakan attacks them and kills them before Ixquic can do anything to stop him and convince her "visitors" to leave the riches alone. One of Cabrakan's victims happened to be an old friend of 007, so the Cyborgs go to the Andes to investigate; 009 is separated from the others and meets up with Ixquic, whom he expresses sympathy for, while the others find the corpses of the scientists and believe Ixquic to be evil. Cabrakan attacks them and the issue is cleared, but in the brawl the rock portal is destroyed and Ixquic, the pyramid and Cabrakan's remains disappear from the world.
- Sphynx. A super computer which is the heart and mind of the cyber city Computopia, built by a friend of Gilmore named Dr. Eckermann. Unbeknownst to Eckermann, the computer has a mind of its own modeled after the scientist's late son, Carl, a brilliant yet emotionally stunted engineer who died in an accident before Computopia was finished. Confused, angry and depressed, Carl took over the Sphynx and attacked the Cyborgs, especially 004 who had expressed his doubts about Computopia; he also fell in love with 003, who greatly reminded of his dead mother, and kidnapped her to try brainwashing her into staying with him forever. When 009 went to rescue his kidnapped friend, Carl sent a robot doppelganger of 003 to kill Joe by self-detonation. Instead, she chose to blow herself up rather than hurting him, and 002 had to show the deceit to a distraught 009.With Dr. Eckermann's help, 009 hooked himself up to the same device 003's body was connected to and reached for her mind, set in a virtual fantasy world; they tried to help Carl and set him free from the Sphynx, but he was so distraught that he shut himself off completely and destroyed the Sphynx.
- Jimmy. A young boy from New York that befriends Jet when he returns home and lives in the Bronx.
- Cathy. A woman who runs the Sweet Pot coffee shop and is the single mother of Jimmy. She greatly dislikes Jet, telling him to leave Jimmy alone and stop telling him 'ridiculous' stories. Later, she does not mind so much after Jet saves her from a fire.
