= Cyborg 009 VS Devilman =

Crossover direct-to-video anime

- Theatrical release poster for Cyborg 009 VS Devilman.

サイボーグ009VSデビルマン (Saibōgu 009 VS Debiruman)
- Genre: Dark fantasy; Science fiction
- Created by: Shotaro Ishinomori; Go Nagai
- Original video animation
- Directed by: Jun Kawagoe
- Written by: Tadashi Hayakawa
- Studio: Bee Media, Actas
- Licensed by: NA: Discotek Media
- Released: 11 November 2015; Theatrical Screening; 17 October 2015
- Runtime: 30 minutes each
- Episodes: 3
- Novel

Cyborg 009 VS Devilman Treacheries: The Traitors
- Written by: Tadashi Hayakawa
- Published: 25 September 2015
- Manga

Cyborg 009 VS Devilman: Breakdown
- Written by: Akihito Yoshitomi
- Published by: Kodansha, Niconico
- Magazine: Suiyōbi no Sirius
- Original run: 14 October 2015 – 24 February 2016
- Volumes: 1
- icon

Cyborg 009 VS Devilman (サイボーグ009VSデビルマン, Saibōgu 009 VS Debiruman) is a three-part anime OVA that serves as a crossover between the Cyborg 009 and Devilman series. It was first screened on 17 October 2015 and was released on 11 November 2015. The series inspired a manga adaptation and a prequel novel. Netflix acquired the international streaming rights for the series.

== Plot ==
Cyborg 009 and his team come into conflict with a mysterious threat that leads to Japan and take on Devilman in the process. After some misunderstandings, a secret team of Cyborgs designed by the evil Black Ghost, and a devil outbreak it's up to 009 and Devilman to prevent total annihilation.

== Characters ==
Characters	Japanese	English
Cyborg 009
Joe Shimamura / Cyborg 009	Jun Fukuyama	Johnny Yong Bosch
Ivan Whisky / Cyborg 001	Haruka Shiraishi	Christine Marie Cabanos
Jet Link / Cyborg 002	Tomoaki Maeno	Spike Spencer
Françoise Arnoul / Cyborg 003	M.A.O	Stephanie Sheh
Albert Heinrich / Cyborg 004	Hiroki Tōchi	Michael Sinterniklaas
Geronimo Jr. / Cyborg 005	Tsuyoshi Koyama	Keith Silverstein
Chang Changku / Cyborg 006	Yū Mizushima	Joey Lotsko
Great Britain / Cyborg 007	Hozumi Gōda	Tony Azzolino
Pyunma / Cyborg 008	Ayumu Okamura	Steve Staley
Apollo	Akira Ishida	Fred McDougal
Helena	Yōko Honna	Christine Marie Cabanos
Professor Isaac Gilmore	Shigeru Ushiyama	Dave Mallow
Devilman
Devilman / Akira Fudō	Shintarō Asanuma	Bryce Papenbrook
Miki Makimura	Saori Hayami	Cristina Valenzuela
Ryō Asuka	Satoshi Hino	Chris Smith
Jinmen	Hōchū Ōtsuka	Taylor Henry
Sachiko	Atsuko Enomoto	Erin Fitzgerald
New characters
Edward Adams / Cyborg 0014	Yoshimasa Hosoya	Kyle McCarley
Eva Maria Parallels / Cyborg 0015	Minako Kotobuki	Marieve Herington (credited as Lindsay Torrence)
Cain / Cyborg 0016		
Abel / Cyborg 0017	Mutsumi Tamura	Johanna Luis
Seth / Cyborg 0018 / Atun	Hiro Shimono	Griffin Burns
Dr. Adams	Fumihiko Tachiki	Michael McConnohie (credited as Geoffrey Chalmers)
Lilith	Mie Sonozaki	Wendee Lee
Pazuzu		Jamieson Price (credited as Taylor Henry)

== Background ==
The film was originally announced as two separate projects.

Before Go Nagai became the author of Devilman, he worked as an assistant to Shotaro Ishinomori, drawing backgrounds for the Cyborg 009 manga. It was reported in Sankei Sports that he wished to do a collaboration with Ishinomori.

It was announced in March 2015 that a Cyborg 009 anime, directed by Jun Kawagoe, was in production to commemorate the 50th anniversary of the manga's debut. It was later announced that the anime would receive a theatrical release in autumn.

Dynamic Planning separately announced a Devilman anime in April 2014, produced by animation studio Actas. The project was scheduled for a fall 2015 release.

It was revealed in June 2015 that the two separately announced projects would in fact be a single crossover, titled Cyborg 009 VS Devilman.

== Production ==
The anime is a three-part original video animation directed by Jun Kawagoe and written by Tadashi Hayakawa, with animation by the studios Bee Media and Actas. JAM Project produced both the opening theme song, "Cyborg 009 ~Nine Cyborg Soldiers~", and the ending theme, "Devil Mind ~Ai wa Chikara~".

== Release ==
The first full trailer for the anime was released on 25 August 2015.

It was originally announced that the anime would have a two-week run in eight theaters; however, the number of theaters was later expanded to ten. It debuted on 17 October 2015.

The complete set of three 30-minute episodes was released on Blu-ray on 11 November 2015. The individual episodes were released on DVD separately on 11 November 2015, 9 December 2015, and 6 January 2016.

Netflix acquired the streaming rights to the series, streaming it in 20 languages in 190 countries. The English dub was directed by Bob Buchholz and translated by Sachiko Takahashi.

In 2025, Netflix sublicensed the series to Discotek Media for home release.

== Other media ==
=== Manga ===
A manga adaptation, titled Cyborg 009 VS Devilman: Breakdown (サイボーグ009VSデビルマン BREAKDOWN, Saibōgu 009 VS Debiruman Breakdown), by Akihito Yoshitomi began serialization in Kodansha and Niconico's online magazine Wednesday Sirius (水曜日のシリウス, Suiyōbi no Shiriusu) between 14 October 2015 and 24 February 2016. The first chapter was also published with Monthly Shōnen Sirius on 26 October 2015. The manga was collected in one volume on 8 April 2016.

No.	Japanese release date	Japanese ISBN
01	8 April 2016	978-4-06-390625-7
1. Shōkan (召喚); 2. Kōbō (攻防); 3. Sōgū (遭遇); 4. Gekitotsu (激突); 5. Yūgō (融合)

=== Novel ===
A prequel novel, written by Tadashi Hayakawa and titled Cyborg 009 VS Devilman Treacheries: The Traitors (Cyborg 009 VS Devilman Treacheries ~Uragirimono-tachi), was published on 25 September 2015.
