= Cyborg 009 =

Japanese media franchise based on a manga of the same name

- First volume cover featuring Joe Shimamura

サイボーグ・ゼロ・ゼロ・ナイン (Saibōgu Zero-Zero-Nain)
- Genre: Adventure, science fiction
- Created by: Shotaro Ishinomori
- Manga
- Written by: Shotaro Ishinomori
- Published by: Akita Shoten; Kodansha; Media Factory; Shogakukan; Shueisha
- English publisher: NA: ComiXology (current); Tokyopop (former)
- Magazine: Monthly Shōnen King; Weekly Shōnen Magazine; Shōnen Big Comic; COM; Shōjo Comic; Weekly Shōnen Sunday; Monthly Shōnen Jump; Monthly Comic Nora
- Original run: 1964 – 1981
- Volumes: 27 (Note: Cyborg 009 has received many re-releases over the years, with the Sunday Comics tankōbon by Akita Shoten being the first collected edition. Published by Kadokawa Shoten in 27 volumes, "Complete Works" is the most complete version of this manga. This version includes all chapters written and illustrated by Shotaro Ishinomori published between 1964 and 1981, with the exception of the unfinished arcs and (for unknown reasons) the chapter "Emergency Simulation 1992".)
Further information
Manga
Conclusion: Gods' War
Written by	Joe Onodera
Illustrated by	Masato Hayase
Published by	Shogakukan
Magazine	Club Sunday
Original run	2012 – 2013
Volumes	5
Anime film
Directed by	Yugo Serikawa
Produced by	Hiroshi Okawa
Written by	Takashi Iijima; Yugo Serikawa
Music by	Ichirou Kosugita; Noriyoshi Oohira
Studio	Toei Animation
Released	July 21, 1966
Runtime	65 minutes
Anime film
Cyborg 009: Monster Wars
Directed by	Yugo Serikawa
Produced by	Hiroshi Okawa
Written by	Daisaku Shirakawa; Yugo Serikawa
Music by	Taichiro Kosuki; Susumu Konishi
Studio	Toei Animation
Released	March 19, 1967
Runtime	60 minutes
Anime television series
Directed by	Yugo Serikawa
Written by	Masaki Tsuji
Studio	Toei Animation
Original network	NET
Original run	April 5, 1968 – September 27, 1968
Episodes	26
Audio drama
Station	NBS
Original run	January 29, 1979 – February 23, 1979
Episodes	20
Anime television series
Directed by	Ryōsuke Takahashi
Produced by	Takahashi Iijima; Takeyuki Suzuki; Yoshiaki Koizumi
Written by	Akiyoshi Sakai; Haruya Yamazaki
Music by	Koichi Sugiyama
Studio	Nippon Sunrise (Note: Animation studio); Toei Company (Note: Production company)
Original network	ANN (TV Asahi)
English network	US: KEMO-TV (subtitled)
Original run	March 6, 1979 – March 25, 1980
Episodes	50
Anime film
Cyborg 009: Legend of the Super Galaxy
Directed by	Masayuki Akehi
Written by	Ryuzo Nakanishi
Music by	Koichi Sugiyama
Studio	Toei Animation
Released	December 20, 1980
Runtime	130 minutes
Video game
Developer	Riot
Publisher	Telenet Japan
Genre	Action
Platform	Mega CD
Released	July 30, 1993
Video game
Developer	Interbec
Publisher	Bandai
Genre	Action
Platform	Super Famicom
Released	February 25, 1994
Anime television series
Cyborg 009: The Cyborg Soldier
Directed by	Jun Kawagoe
Produced by	Taka Nagasawa; Takayuki Nagasawa
Written by	Kenichi Ohashi; Tomoko Konparu
Music by	Tetsuya Komuro
Studio	Japan Vistec; Studio OX
Licensed by	NA: Discotek Media
Original network	TV Tokyo
English network	SG: Animax; US: Cartoon Network (Toonami)
Original run	October 14, 2001 – October 13, 2002
Episodes	51
Video game
Simple Characters 2000 Series Vol. 15: Cyborg 009: The Block Kuzushi
Developer	Access
Publisher	Bandai
Genre	Action
Platform	PlayStation
Released	October 10, 2002
Video game
CR Cyborg 009
Developer	NewGin
Publisher	NewGin
Genre	Pachinko
Platform	Arcade
Released	2003
Audio drama
Cyborg 009: Rebirth
Original run	September 21, 2009 – September 28, 2009
Anime film
009 Re:Cyborg
Directed by	Kenji Kamiyama
Produced by	Tomohiko Ishii
Written by	Kenji Kamiyama
Music by	Kenji Kawai
Studio	Production I.G; Sanzigen
Licensed by	AUS: Madman Entertainment; NA: Funimation; UK: Anime Limited
Released	October 27, 2012
Runtime	105 minutes
Original video animation
Cyborg 009 VS Devilman
Directed by	Jun Kawagoe
Written by	Tadashi Hayakawa
Studio	Bee Media; Actas
Released	October 17, 2015
Runtime	30 minutes each
Episodes	3
Anime film series
Cyborg 009: Call of Justice
Directed by	Kokai Kakimoto
Produced by	Katsuji Morishita; Yoshiki Sakurai
Written by	Kenji Kamiyama
Music by	Yoshihiro Ike
Studio	OLM Digital; Signal MD
Released	November 25, 2016 – December 9, 2016
Runtime	100 minutes each
Films	3
Manga
Cyborg 009: Bgooparts Delete
Written by	Tsuguo Okazaki
Published by	Akita Shoten
Magazine	Champion Red
Original run	July 19, 2019 – September 19, 2022
Volumes	5
Original net animation
Cyborg 009: Nemesis
Directed by	Hideki Ambo
Written by	Atsuhiro Tomioka; Charatex
Studio	Arect
Released	July 19, 2026
Episodes	3
- icon

Cyborg 009 (Japanese: サイボーグ・ゼロ・ゼロ・ナイン, Hepburn: Saibōgu Zero-Zero-Nain) is a Japanese science fiction manga created by Shotaro Ishinomori. It was serialized in many different Japanese magazines, including Monthly Shōnen King, Weekly Shōnen Magazine, Shōnen Big Comic, COM, Shōjo Comic, Weekly Shōnen Sunday, Monthly Shōnen Jump, and Monthly Comic Nora. In 2012, comiXology acquired the digital distribution rights to Shotaro Ishinomori's catalogue, including Cyborg 009.

== Plot ==
Nine people from around the world are kidnapped by the evil Black Ghost organization, led by the tyrant Skull, to undergo experiments that would allow him to use them as human weapons to promote the production of cyborg warfare. While he succeeds in converting the group of nine into cyborgs with superhuman powers, his most reputable scientist, Dr. Isaac Gilmore, helps the cyborgs escape to rebel against Skull and Black Ghost. The nine cyborgs – from which the name of the series is derived – band together in order to stop Black Ghost from achieving its goal of starting the next world war by supplying rich buyers with countless weapons of mass destruction. After the destruction of Black Ghost, the nine cyborgs go on to fight a variety of threats, such as mad scientists, supernatural beings, and ancient civilizations.

== Media ==
=== Manga ===
The first series was serialized in Weekly Shōnen King (Shōnen Gahosha). It depicts Cyborg 009's origin story, the escape from Black Ghost, and the group running from the cyborg assassins. It ended with the battle against the Mythos Cyborgs.

The second series, called The Underground Empire Yomi Arc, appeared in Weekly Shōnen Magazine (Kodansha) alongside the release of the film version. The story is highly influenced by Edgar Rice Burroughs' Earth's Core series, including an expedition to the center of the Earth with a drill tank and a reptile race who can use telepathy and grow wings. The story ends with the final battle against Black Ghost. In the final scene, 009 and 002 fall into Earth's atmosphere and are seen as a shooting star by two small children, one of whom wishes for a toy gun and the other for world peace (a scene reminiscent of Ray Bradbury's Kaleidoscope). However, 001 was able to use his telekinetic powers at the last minute to retrieve 002 and 009 from their plummet before death.

The third series, serialized in Bōken Ō (Akita Shoten), contained 6 story arcs, including the Monster Island Arc, the Middle East Arc, and the Angels Arc. The series abruptly ended during the Angels Arc.

The fourth series, called The Battle of the Gods, was serialized in COM (Mushi Production). Ishinomori resumed and retold the interrupted Angels Arc with a new plot, but the series once again ended abruptly. Ishinomori would not resume the series for a few years after this.

The fifth series was serialized in Shōjo Comic (Shogakukan), and included the Wind City Arc, the Snow Carnival Arc, and the Edda Arc. The story deals with legendary and mythical like characters challenging the 00 Number Cyborgs.

The sixth series followed closely after the fifth series. Arcs such as the Deinonychus Arc (appeared in Monthly Shōnen Jump (Shueisha)) and Green Hole Arc (appeared in Play Comic (Akita Shoten)) were depicted, then long after, the Underwater Pyramid Arc was serialized in Monthly Manga Shōnen (Asahi Sonorama).

The seventh series was serialized in Weekly Shōnen Sunday (Shogakukan) alongside the revival anime. A long arc consisting of many short arcs, this series dealt with the battle against Neo Black Ghost as well as the emotional trauma of the 00 Number Cyborgs. The story is set approximately 20 years after the Yomi Arc, and the personalities and conduct of the cyborgs are depicted as more adult.

The eighth series was serialized in Monthly Comic Nora (Gakken). This longer arc was called People Drifting Through Time and Space Arc, and is a sequel to the Immigration Arc. The Count of St. Germain from the Underwater Pyramid Arc appears, but the design of his drawing is different.

==== Manga publication history ====
The series was written and illustrated by Shotaro Ishinomori, serialized in Monthly Shōnen King, published in Japan by Akita Shoten and other companies through its history, and published in North America by Tokyopop.

Digital comics distributor comiXology licensed the entire catalogue from Ishimori Productions in 2012, and has made the first 10 volumes of Cyborg 009 available to the public.

In April 2012, Shogakukan announced that the Cyborg 009 manga would conclude in Weekly Shōnen Sunday. Entitled Cyborg 009 Conclusion: God's War, the manga is to be illustrated by Masato Hayase and to be based on Ishinomori's original concept notes, sketches, and novel drafts, all of which had been gathered by his son, Joe Onodera. Conclusion debuted on April 13, 2012, and ran until February 2014. It was collected in 5 volumes.

==== Cyborg 009: Bgooparts Delete ====
A manga series written and illustrated by Tsuguo Okazaki, titled Cyborg 009: Bgooparts Delete, was serialized in Champion Red from July 19, 2019, to September 19, 2022.

==== 8 Man vs. Cyborg 009 ====
A crossover manga between 8 Man and Cyborg 009 by Kyoichi Nanatsuki (script) and Masato Hayate (art), was serialized in Champion Red from July 18, 2020, to May 19, 2023. In this work, Black Ghost, revived after the Cold War, kidnaps 8 Man's inventor, Tani, to blackmail 8 Man to destroy the 00 cyborgs, so that Black Ghost can dominate the world using a laser satellite created by Professor Demon (one of 8 Man's original antagonists). 8 Man, Professor Demon, and the cyborgs team up to destroy Black Ghost.

=== Graphic novel ===
A full-color graphic novel based on the franchise was released at San Diego Comic-Con on July 21, 2013, to align with the anniversary of Ishinomori's original manga. The book is a condensed retelling of the 00 Cyborgs' battle against Black Ghost, led by Sekar (Skull). The full release was on September 11, 2013. The graphic novel is written by F. J. DeSanto and Bradley Cramp, penciled and inked by Marcus To, and published by Archaia Comics.

=== Films ===
==== 1966 film ====
The first Cyborg 009 film was released on July 21, 1966. It was produced by Hiroshi Ōkawa (uncredited) and directed by Yugo Serikawa.

Cyborg 009: Monster Wars (サイボーグ009 怪獣戦争, Saiboogu Zero-Zero-Nain Kaijuu Sensou) was the second film for Cyborg 009 and released on March 19, 1967. It was produced by Hiroshi Ōkawa and directed by Yugo Serikawa.

The theme song for both films was "Song of Cyborg 009" (サイボーグ009の歌, Saibōgu Zero Zero Nain no Uta) (Lyrics: Masahisa Urushibara, Composer, Arrangement: Taichirō Kosugi, Singer: Tokyo Meister Singer)

==== Cast ====
- 009: Hiroyuki Ōta
- 001: Kyoko Toriyama
- 002: Ryō Ishihara
- 003: Judy Ongg
- 004: Hiroshi Ōtake
- 005: Hiroshi Masuoka
- 006: Arihiro Fujimura
- 007: Machiko Soga
- 008: Kenji Utsumi
- Professor Gilmore: Jōji Yanami
- Black Ghost Leader: Masato Yamanouchi
- Beagle: Kiyoshi Kawakubo
- Easel: Sanji Hase
- Helena: Etsuko Ichihara
- Narrator: Ryō Kurosawa

==== 1980 anime film ====
An anime film based on the second anime television series was released on December 20, 1980, named Cyborg 009: Legend of the Super Galaxy (サイボーグ009 超銀河伝説, Saibōgu Zero Zero Nain: Chou Ginga Densetsu).

The theme song was "Love of 1 Billion Lightyears" (10億光年の愛, Jū-oku Kōnen no Ai) (Lyrics: Michio Yamagami, Composer: Kōichi Morita, Arrangement: Reijirō Koroku, Singer: Yoshito Machida).

==== Cast ====
- 009: Kazuhiko Inoue/Walter Carroll
- 001: Fuyumi Shiraishi/Mary Malone
- 002: Keiichi Noda/Don Pomes
- 003: Kazuko Sugiyama/Michelle Hart
- 004: Keaton Yamada/Richard Nieskins
- 005: Banjo Ginga/Frank Rogers
- 006: Sanji Hase/Jeff Manning
- 007: Kaneta Kimotsuki/James Keating
- 008: Kazuyuki Sogabe/Clay Lowrey
- Professor Gilmore: Jōji Yanami/Cliff Harrington
- Dr Cosmo: Ichirō Nagai/Mike Worman
- Saba: Noriko Ohara/Gerri Sorrells
- Princess Tamara: Hiroko Suzuki/Deborah DeSnoo
- Zoa: Tōru Ōhira/William Ross
- Gallo: Chikao Ohtsuka/Lanny Broyles
- Narrator: Ryō Ishihara/Avi Laudau

==== 2012 film (009 Re:Cyborg) ====
A 3D film, produced by Production I.G., Sanzigen and Ishimori Productions, was released on October 27, 2012. Kenji Kamiyama was the director and writer. Kenji Kawai, who worked before with Kamiyama on Moribito: Guardian of the Spirit and Eden of the East, composed the music. The film was released in Japan on October 27, 2012. It also opened simultaneously in more than five Asian regions, including Hong Kong, Taiwan, Singapore, Malaysia, and South Korea. A manga adaptation by Gatou Asou, character designer for Moribito and Occult Academy, was serialized in Square Enix's Monthly Big Gangan. The UK anime distributor Anime Limited announced that they acquired the movie and produced an English dub at NYAV Post. Madman Entertainment also has rights to release the film in Australia and New Zealand. At Anime Expo 2013, Funimation had announced that they acquired the film for North America. The English voice cast was announced on April 16, 2015.

==== 2016 film trilogy (Cyborg 009: Call of Justice) ====
Another 3D film, produced by Production I.G. and animated by OLM Digital and Signal.MD and distributed by Toho, was released on November 25, 2016. The movie itself was divided into three parts, with Part 2 being released December 2, 2016, and Part 3 on December 9, 2016. Kenji Kamiyama was chief director of the project, and Kokai Kakimoto directed the film. Netflix acquired digital distribution rights to the movie, where the movie was shown first on Netflix Japan in Spring 2016, with other territories following later. The films, edited down into 12 episodes, were released worldwide on Netflix on February 10, 2017.

==== Cast ====
- 009: Keisuke Koumoto/Kyle McCarley
- 001: Misato Fukuen/Erica Mendez
- 002: Takuya Satō/Robbie Daymond
- 003: Risa Taneda/Cristina Vee
- 004: Satoshi Hino/Ray Chase
- 005: Kenji Nomura/Chris Tergliafera
- 006: Mitsuaki Madono/Kirk Thornton
- 007: Setsuji Satō/Ben Diskin
- 008: Haruki Ishiya/Zeno Robinson
- Katarina Canetti: Yui Makino/Cherami Leigh
- Emperor: Kazuhiko Inoue/Patrick Seitz

=== Television series ===
==== 1968 series ====
An anime adaptation was released on April 5, 1968, on NET and ended on September 27, 1968, with a total of 26 episodes. This series was directed by Yugo Serikawa, Takeshi Tamiya, Tomoharu Katsumata, Toshio Katsuda, Taiji Yabushita, Ryōzō Tanaka, Yoshikata Nitta, Kazuya Miyazaki, Fusahiro Nagaki, Minoru Okazaki, Yoshio Takami.

The opening theme song for the anime series was "Cyborg 009" (サイボーグ009) (Lyrics: Masahisa Urushibara, Composer, Arrangement: Taichirō Kosugi, Vocals: Tokyo Meister Singer. The outro theme was "End the Battle" (戦いおわって, Tatakai Owatte) (Lyrics: Shotaro Ishinomori, Composer, Arrangement: Taichirō Kosugi, Singer: Vocal Shop)

==== Cast ====
- 009: Katsuji Mori (as Setsuya Tanaka)
- 001: Fuyumi Shiraishi
- 002: Ryō Ishihara
- 003: Hiroko Suzuki
- 004: Hiroshi Ōtake/Kenji Utsumi
- 005: Hiroshi Masuoka
- 006: Ichirō Nagai
- 007: Machiko Soga
- 008: Keiichi Noda
- Professor Gilmore: Jōji Yanami

==== DVD Box ====
The "サイボーグ009 モノクロ DVD BOX" was released in January 2006 from Buena Vista Home Entertainment. The low-priced edition "サイボーグ009 1968 DVD-COLLECTION" was released in July 2009 from TOEI COMPANY, LTD.

==== 1979–1980 series ====
Another anime for Cyborg 009 was released on March 6, 1979, on TV Asahi and ended on March 25, 1980, with a total of 50 episodes.

The opening theme song for the anime was "For Whose Sake" (誰がために, Taga tame ni). The lyrics were by Shotaro Ishinomori, the composer was Masaaki Harao, the arrangement was done by Koichi Sugiyama and vocals were provided by Ken Narita and Koorogi '73); the ending theme was "Someday" (いつの日か, Itsu no Hi ka). The lyrics were by Saburō Yatsude while the composer was Masaaki Harao, the arrangement was done by Koichi Sugiyama and vocals were provided by Koorogi '73. The show was a huge hit in Sweden where it was one of the earliest anime series to be dubbed into Swedish and released in its entirety on VHS. The success with the audience came despite the fact that the entire voice cast was provided by one actor, Danish national Timm Mehrens.

==== Cast ====
- 009: Kazuhiko Inoue
- 001: Sachiko Chijimatsu
- 002: Keiichi Noda
- 003: Kazuko Sugiyama
- 004: Keaton Yamada
- 005: Banjō Ginga (as Takashi Tanaka)
- 006: Sanji Hase
- 007: Kaneta Kimotsuki
- 008: Kōji Totani
- Professor Gilmore: Kōsei Tomita
- Brahma: Toshio Furukawa
- Vishnu: Takashi Tanaka
- Shiva: Kōji Totani
- Gandal: Kōji Nakata
- Odin: Ichirō Nagai/Shigezō Sasaoka (Neo Black Ghost Arc)
- Loki: Isamu Tanonaka
- Thor: Hidekatsu Shibata
- Freya: Rihoko Yoshida
- Narrator: Keiichi Noda

==== 2001–2002 series ====
A third television series, entitled Cyborg 009: The Cyborg Soldier was broadcast on TV Tokyo from October 14, 2001, to October 13, 2002, on Sundays at 18:30. It spanned a total of fifty-one episodes.

The opening theme song for the third anime television series was "What's the Justice?" by Globe. The first ending theme was "Genesis of Next" by Globe followed by "Starting from Here" by Globe and later was replaced with "I Do" by Fayray.

The 2001–2002 series of Cyborg 009: The Cyborg Soldier was dubbed by Animaze, Inc. and ZRO Limit Productions, and was shortened to its manga name. The English-dubbed version of Cyborg 009 aired on Cartoon Network as part of its weekday after-school action anime/animation programming block, Toonami in 2003 with the first 26 episodes, and was on its unnamed late Friday night/Early Saturday morning "Graveyard Shift" line-up in 2004 to air episodes 27 to 42, before it was dropped from their lineup. The edited version of the series was also distributed by Sony Pictures Family Entertainment Group, while the uncut version is distributed by Sony Pictures Television.

==== Cast ====
- 009: Takahiro Sakurai/Joshua Seth, David Umansky (episodes 5 and 9)
- 009 as a child: Takako Honda/Joshua Seth
- 001: Kana Ueda/Bob Marx
- 002: Showtaro Morikubo/Sparky Allen
- 003: Satsuki Yukino/Midge Mayes
- 004: Nobuo Tobita/Peter Doyle
- 005: Akio Ōtsuka/John Daniels (role mistakenly credited for David Umansky)
- 006: Chafurin/Steve Kramer
- 007: Yūichi Nagashima/Michael Sorich
- 008: Mitsuo Iwata/Keith Anthony
- Professor Gilmore: Mugihito/Simon Prescott
- Skull: Norio Wakamoto/Richard Epcar
- Professor Kozumi: Junpei Takiguchi/Ray Michaels
- 0010: Issei Futamata/Joe Ochman
- Hilda: Akiko Koike/Lia Sargent
- 0011: Tōru Ōkawa/James Lyon
- 0012: Sayuri/Melora Harte
- Mr. Yasu: Kōsuke Okano/Dan Woren
- 0013: Kentarō Itō/David Lucas
- Scare: Tetsuo Gotō/Dave Lelyveld
- Machinegun: Mitsuaki Hoshino/David Umansky
- Roentgen: Kōichi Nagano/Gil Starberry
- Dr. Beruku: Aruno Tahara/Dave Lelyveld
- Zanbaruzu: Fumihiko Tachiki/Jake Martin
- Recruit: Naoki Yanagi/Bob Marx
- Cynthia Findoru: Tomoko Kawakami/Julie Maddalena
- Prof. Findoru: Kazuaki Ito/Jeremy Platt
- Jean-Paul Arnoul: Nobutoshi Canna/Richard Hayworth
- Natalie: Sachiko Kojima/Deanna Morris
- Sophie/Rosa: Yōko Sōmi/Lia Sargent (Sophie), Jane Alan (Rosa)
- Unbaba: Shōzō Iizuka
- Kabore: Wataru Takagi/David Rasner
- Mamado: Ryōtarō Okiayu/David Rasner
- Freje: Minoru Inaba/David Lucas
- Yang: Mitsuru Ogata/Jeff Nimoy
- Gustav: Tetsuo Kanao/Jeremy Platt
- Mrs. Tsuyama: Tomie Kataoka/Sonja S. Fox
- Cathy: Kaori Saiki/Melora Harte
- Jimmy: Yoshiko Kamei/Barbara Goodson
- Dr. Ross: Masaru Ikeda/Jeremy Platt
- Dr. Kiley: Yasunori Masutani/Terry Roberts
- Apollo: Akira Ishida/Richard Hayworth
- Artemis: Minami Takayama/Lia Sargent
- Minotaur: Tomoya Kawai/John Smallberries
- Achilles: Hiroshi Yanaka/David Umansky
- Hera/Pan: Yū Sugimoto/Sonja S. Fox (Hera)
- Atlas: Kiyoyuki Yanada
- Nereus: Tomoya Kawai
- Poseidon: Kiyoyuki Yanada/Ray Michaels
- Professor Gaia: Ikuya Sawaki/David Umansky
- Pal: Yūki Tokiwa/David Umansky
- Blue Beast: Masane Tsukayama/Abe Lasser
- Carl Eckermann: Shinichiro Miki/Steve Areno
- Dr. Eckermann: Takkō Ishimori/Abe Lasser
- Hachiro Marukaku: Nobuyuki Kobushi/Richard Hayworth
- Dr. Shishigashira: Daisuke Egawa
- Dr. Mamushi: Sukekiyo Kameyama/Tom Charles
- Dr. Kong: Tomoya Kawai/John Smallberries
- Dr. Dracula: Tomohisa Aso/Peter Spellos
- Dr. Alligator: Sosuke Komori/Jake Martin
- Dr. Herschel: Masaaki Tsukada/Anthony Mozdy
- Princess Ixquic: Sumi Shimamoto/Wendee Lee
- Alice: Natsuki Yamashita/Reba West
- Lina: Mie Sonozaki/Cindy Robinson
- Cain: Toshiyuki Morikawa/David Umansky
- Mai: Romi Park/Sonja S. Fox
- Phil: Mitsuki Saiga/Richard Hayworth
- Nichol: Tomoya Kawai/Jeff Nimoy
- Dr. Gamo Whisky/Asimov: Seizō Katō/Anthony Mozdy
- Erica Whisky: Hikari Yono
- Professor Isono: Naomi Kusumi/Abe Lasser
- Shinichi Ibaraki: Isshin Chiba/David Umansky
- Shinichi as a child: Akiko Koike/David Umansky
- Masaru Oyamada: Nobuyuki Kobushi/Tony Oliver
- Masaru as a child: Ayako Ito/Tony Oliver
- Mary Onodera: Takako Honda/Wendee Lee
- Van Vogt: Unshō Ishizuka/David Lucas
- Helen/Vena/Daphne/Aphro/Dinah: Yuki Masuda (all) /Michelle Ruff (Helen), Lia Sargent (Vena), Jane Alan (Daphne), Kay Jensen (Aphro), Julie Ann Taylor (Dinah)
- Black Ghost (male): Kenji Utsumi/James Lyon
- Black Ghost (female): Ryoko Kinomiya/Jane Alan
- Black Ghost (child): Yūshō Uemura/Barbara Goodson
- Kazu: Yuki Tokiwa/Jane Alan
- Kazu's sister: Risa Shimizu/Wendee Lee

=== Original video animation ===
A three-part original video animation crossover with Go Nagai's Devilman series, titled Cyborg 009 VS Devilman, received a two-week theatrical release in October 2015. The OVA was directed by Jun Kawagoe. Netflix released the OVA internationally in 20 languages on April 1, 2016, including an English dub.

==== Cast ====
- 009: Jun Fukuyama/Johnny Yong Bosch
- 001: Haruka Shiraishi/Christine Marie Cabanos
- 002: Tomoaki Maeno/Spike Spencer
- 003: M.A.O/Stephanie Sheh
- 004: Hiroki Tōchi/Michael Sinterniklaas
- 005: Tsuyoshi Koyama/Keith Silverstein
- 006: Yū Mizushima/Joey Lotsko
- 007: Hozumi Gōda/Tony Azzolino
- 008: Ayumu Okamura/Steve Staley
- Apollo: Akira Ishida/Fred McDougal
- Helena: Yōko Honna/Christine Marie Cabanos
- Dr. Isaac Gilmore: Shigeru Ushiyama/Dave Mallow

=== Original net animation ===
A new anime adaptation, titled Cyborg 009: Nemesis, was announced on July 19, 2025, to celebrate the 61st anniversary of the original manga's launch. The original net animation (ONA) series is produced by Arect and directed by Hideki Ambo, with Atsuhiro Tomioka and Charatex writing the screenplay and Sanorin designing the characters. It premiered its three episodes on July 19, 2026. The opening theme song is "For Whose Sake" (誰がために, Taga tame ni), performed by Barbee Boys, previously used for the 1979 television series, and the ending theme song is "Climal" (クライマル, Kuraimaru), performed by Sukima Switch.

==== Cast ====
- Joe Shimamura/009: Yuki Kaji
- Graviton/Nemesis 009: Yuichi Nakamura
- Mu/Nemesis 001: Rina Hidaka
- Blizzard/Nemesis 002: Yoshimasa Hosoya
- Crack/Nemesis 003: Hiroshi Kamiya
- Opro/Nemesis 004: Kikuko Inoue
- Aspida/Nemesis 005: Tetsu Inada
- Blitz/Nemesis 006: Shion Wakayama
- Morphone/Nemesis 007: Maaya Uchida
- Deps/Nemesis 008: Ayane Sakura
- Pyunma/Cyborg 008: Yū Hayashi
- Great Britain/Cyborg 007: Kentaro Tone
- Chang Changku/Cyborg 006: Mitsuaki Kanuka
- Geronimo Junior/Cyborg 005: Hiroki Yasumoto
- Albert Heinrich/Cyborg 004: Tomokazu Sugita
- Françoise Arnoul/Cyborg 003: Saori Hayami
- Jet Link/Cyborg 002: Mamoru Miyano
- Ivan Whiskey/Cyborg 001: Junko Minagawa
- Dr. Isaac Gilmore: Kazuhiro Yamaji
- Dr. Robert Golbert: Tōru Nara

=== Radio dramas ===
==== 1979 radio drama ====
A radio drama was produced for NBS's Kirin Radio Theater from January 29 to February 23, 1979.

===== Cast =====
- 009: Akira Kamiya
- 001: Sachiko Chijimatsu
- 002: Kazuyuki Sogabe
- 003: Kazuko Sugiyama
- 004: Shunsuke Shima
- 005: Ryüsuke Shiomi
- 006: Masayuki Yuhara
- 007: Kaneta Kimotsuki
- 008: Toyokazu Minami
- Dr. Gilmore: Hitoshi Takagi

==== 2009 radio drama ====
A second radio drama, entitled Cyborg 009: Birth, was aired in two parts on September 21 and 28, 2009.

===== Cast =====
- 009: Takeshi Kusao
- 001: Katsue Miwa
- 002: Hideyuki Hori
- 003: Machiko Toyoshima
- 004: Nobutoshi Canna
- 005: Ryūzaburō Ōtomo
- 006: Kōzō Shioya
- 007: Keiichi Nanba
- 008: Toshio Furukawa
- Dr. Gilmore: Takeshi Aono
- Black Ghost Boss: Hidekatsu Shibata
- Scientist A: Tomohisa Asō
- Scientist B: Naoki Imamura
- Underling: Ryōhei Nakao
- Narration: Keiichi Noda

Part 1

- Gamo Whiskey: Hirohiko Kakegawa
- Erika: Kyoko Terase
- Dancer: Isao Teramoto
- Hilda: Akiko Sekina
- Slave Trader: Keiichirō Yamamoto
- Boy: Kohta Nemoto
- Jailer: Masaru Suzuki

Part 2

- Scientist C: Yasuhiko Tokuyama
- Crewman A: Masaru Suzuki
- Crewman B: Kohta Nemoto
- Crewman C: Keiichirō Yamamoto
- Robot: Isao Teramoto

=== Video games ===
Three video games based on the series were released only in Japan. One of them was a platformer released for the Super Famicom by BEC in 1994; for each level the player selects one of the eight adult cyborgs (001 is not playable) as the leader of a strike force for a particular mission accompanied by two others. The second game (released by Telenet Japan's subsidiary Riot) in 1993 was for the Mega-CD and is also a side scroller.

In 2002, Simple Characters 2000 Series Vol. 15: Cyborg 009: The Block Kuzushi was released for the PlayStation by Bandai.

== English releases ==
The 1979 series was broadcast with English subtitles on Japanese-language television in Hawaii, California, and in the New York metropolitan area. The English subtitles were produced by San Francisco-based Fuji Television, which did not broadcast the series as part of its Japanese programming on KEMO-TV.

The 1980 film was released in the United States in 1988 by Celebrity Home Entertainment as Defenders of the Vortex, with an edited version of an English dub that was commissioned through the Tokyo, Japan-based Frontier Enterprises. It later received an unedited direct-to-video English release in 1995 by Best Film and Video Corporation with the full version of the same dub.

The 2001 TV series was licensed by Avex Inc. (the North American branch of Avex Mode, the 2001 series' original distributor in Japan) and dubbed into English by Animaze and ZRO Limit Productions. The entire series was dubbed, with the first 26 episodes shown on the Toonami programming block on Cartoon Network, while episodes 27 to 47 were shown on Cartoon Network's late Friday night "Graveyard Shift" block, right before the show was dropped from their line-up. The first 8 episodes were distributed on DVD by Columbia TriStar Home Entertainment in a two-disc uncut bilingual set, as well as two dub-only edited broadcast volumes of four episodes each along with Portuguese and Spanish dubs. As of 2017, none of the other episodes have become available on home video outside Japan and Hong Kong, but Madman Entertainment released the first 26 dubbed episodes to DVD in Australia; they are since out of print. Discotek Media announced during their Otakon 2017 panel that they have licensed the 2001 series, and they will release the entire series, in the uncut bilingual version, on a SDBD set. The purpose for this set is to restore the uncut version of the dub for the whole series to its best state possible, as well as the video quality. The uncut dub master tapes were damaged upon arrival, due to the age of the DA-88 tapes. The set has an 11-page essay about the restoration process by the company's producer and Anime News Network founder Justin Sevakis, along with an 83-page art gallery. The set was also the North American and dub premiere of the three-episode God's War finale. The set was officially released on June 25, 2019.

The 2012 movie is licensed by Funimation in North America, Anime Limited in the UK, and Madman Entertainment in Australia and New Zealand. An English dub was produced by NYAV Post, and a theatrical release was released in all three territories.

== Reception ==
In TV Asahi's poll of the Top 100 Anime, Cyborg 009 came in 84th.

The Encyclopedia of Science Fiction described the 1966 film Cyborg 009 as an unremarkable, low-budget production with limited animation, whose action-heavy plot was nevertheless largely unexciting, making the film at best "pleasantly forgettable" apart from occasional diverting scenes. It also criticized the caricatured depictions of the African, Chinese and Native American members of the cyborg team. The encyclopedia nevertheless considered the film historically interesting as a possible forerunner of later productions about teams of humans transformed into superheroes, including the Super Sentai franchise and potentially The Six Million Dollar Man. It also discussed the 1968 Cyborg 009 television series, which the entry considered more ambitious than the preceding film, noting that despite its similarly small budget it made better use of its resources, with animation ranging from simplistic to reasonably effective. Although it characterized most episodes as routine, the encyclopedia highlighted the series' unusually strong political themes, particularly its anti-war, anti-nuclear and anti-racist episodes. It singled out Ghost of the Pacific, which invoked World War II, Hiroshima Peace Memorial Park and Article 9 of the Japanese Constitution, and noted that the controversial episode was not rebroadcast for decades. According to screenwriter Masaki Tsuji, the series' relatively short run resulted from its creators' refusal to reduce its political content following complaints from Japanese parent-teacher associations.
