= Yūki Tokiwa =

Japanese actor (born 1991)

Yūki Tokiwa (常盤 祐貴, Tokiwa Yūki; born August 16, 1991) is a Japanese actor and voice actor from Hyōgo Prefecture. He is represented by Himawari Theatre Group. He was the official Japanese voice dub-over artist for actor Rupert Grint as Ron Weasley in the Harry Potter film series and for Daryl Sabara.

== Filmography ==
=== TV drama ===
- Hoshi ni Negai wo (NHK: 1998)
- Shin Ude ni Oboeari (NHK: 1998)
- Suki to Isshin Tasuke (NHK: 1999, 2000)
- Ichigen no Koto (NHK: 2000)
- Kowai Nichiyōbi (NTV: 2000)
- Oyaji. (TBS: 2000)
- Hikon Kazoku (Fuji-TV: 2001)
- Nemurenu Yoru wo Daite (TV Asahi: 2002)

=== Anime ===
- Cyborg 009: The Cyborg Soldier (Pal)

=== OVA ===
- Return to Neverland (Cubby)
- Back to the Conscience (Pinocchio)

=== Video games ===
- Kingdom Hearts (Pinocchio, Flounder)

=== Dubbing ===
==== Live-action ====
- A.I. Artificial Intelligence (David (Haley Joel Osment))
- Butterfly (Moncho)
- Cherrybomb (Malachy)
- The Cider House Rules (Homer Wells)
- The Cat in the Hat (Conrad)
- Don't Look Under the Bed (Darwin McCausland)
- Driving Lessons (Ben Marshall)
- Harry Potter Series as Ron Weasley (Rupert Grint)
  - Harry Potter and the Philosopher's Stone
  - Harry Potter and the Chamber of Secrets
  - Harry Potter and the Prisoner of Azkaban
  - Harry Potter and the Goblet of Fire
  - Harry Potter and the Order of the Phoenix
  - Harry Potter and the Half Blood Prince
  - Harry Potter and the Deathly Hallows – Part 1
  - Harry Potter and the Deathly Hallows – Part 2
- Home Alone 4 (Kevin McCallister)
- The Kid (Rusty Duritz)
- Life Is Beautiful (Joshua)
- The Mummy Returns (Alex)
- Pearl Harbor (Danny as a child)
- The Santa Clause 2 (Curtis)
- Spy Kids (Juni Cortez (Daryl Sabara))
- Spy Kids 2: Island of Lost Dreams (Juni Cortez (Daryl Sabara))
- Spy Kids 3-D: Game Over (Juni Cortez (Daryl Sabara))
- Spy Kids 4-D (Juni Cortez)
- Thunderpants (Alan A. Allen)
- Wild Target (Tony)

==== Animation ====
- Dragon Tales (Enrique)
- Return to Never Land (Cubby)

=== Japanese voice-over ===
- Dragon Tales (Enrique)
- Pinocchio's Daring Journey (Pinocchio)
- Peter Pan's Flight (Cubby)

=== CM ===
- Touyou Suisan
