= Katsuji Mori =

Japanese actor and voice actor (born 1945)

- 森 功至
- Born: 森 深雪 (Miyuki Mori, He later changed his name in the family register to Katsuji Mori.); July 10, 1945 (age 81); Tokyo, Japan
- Occupations: Actor; voice actor; narrator
- Years active: 1950–present
- Agent: plus one company
- Height: 175 cm (5 ft 9 in)

Katsuji Mori (森 功至, Mori Katsuji; born July 10, 1945) is a Japanese actor, voice actor and narrator from Tokyo. He is most known for the roles of Go Mifune in Mach GoGoGo, Joe Shimamura/009 in Cyborg 009, Ken the Eagle in Science Ninja Team Gatchaman, Jouji Minami in Tekkaman: The Space Knight, and Garma Zabi in Mobile Suit Gundam. His former stage name is Setsuya Tanaka (田中 雪弥, Tanaka Setsuya).

== Biography ==
Mori was previously affiliated with Tokyo Actor's Consumer's Cooperative Society, then Aoni Production. He later became independent and established the voice acting agency Office Mori, but the company went bankrupt and was disbanded.

== Filmography ==
=== Television animation ===
1960s

- Mach GoGoGo (1967) – Go Mifune
- Cyborg 009 (1968) – Joe Shimamura a.k.a. 009
- Attack No. 1 (1969) – Tsutomu Ichinose

1970s

- Tiger Mask (1969) – Naoto Date/Tiger Mask (ep. 31~39)
- Gatchaman (1972) – Ken the Eagle/G-1
- Aim for the Ace! (1973) – Takayuki Tōdō
- Cutey Honey (1973) – Seiji Hayami
- Getter Robo (1974) – Shinichi Hayata
- Tekkaman: The Space Knight (1975) – Jouji Minami/Tekkaman
- Getter Robo G (1974) – Sakazaki
- Dokaben (1977) – Shō Doigaki
- Invincible Super Man Zambot 3 (1977) – Uchūta Kamie
- Haikara-san ga Tooru (1978) – Shinobu
- Mobile Suit Gundam (1979) – Garma Zabi
- The Rose of Versailles (1979) – Robespierre

1980s

- Armored Fleet Dairugger XV (1982) – Walter Jack
- Ai Shite Knight (1983) – Satomi Okawa
- Fist of the North Star (1984) – Shū and Zaria
- Video Warrior Laserion (1984) – Inspire, Gario
- Saint Seiya (1986) – Capella, Belzebub, Jaow, Gemini Cloth
- Dragon Ball (1987) – Panputt
- Sakigake!! Otokojuku (1988) – Gouji Akashi
- Tatakae!! Ramenman (1988) – Victory Ramenman
- Kiteretsu Daihyakka (1989) – Kiteretsu Kite
- Dragon Quest (1989) – General Jikido

1990s

- Dragon Ball Z (1990) – Nail
- High School Mystery: Gakuen Nanafushigi (1991) – Sugimura
- Trapp Family Story (1991) – Wasner
- Pretty Soldier Sailor Moon (1992) – Nephrite
- Ghost Sweeper Mikami (1993) – Count Brado

2000s

- Detective Conan (2003) – Kazami
- Fafner in the Azure: Dead Aggressor (2004) – Mitsuhiro Bartland
- The Law of Ueki (2005) – Kobayashi
- Real Drive (2008) – Masamichi Haru
- Rosario+Vampire (2008) – Moka's Father

2010s

- Katanagatari (2010) – Kiki Shikizaki
- Panty & Stocking with Garterbelt (2010) - Arthur Rock
- Sket Dance (2011) – Funzō Takemitsu
- Gatchaman Crowds (2013) – J.J.
- Pocket Monsters: The Origin (2013) – Professor Oak
- Z/X Ignition (2014) – Ayase's Father

2020s

- Lucifer and the Biscuit Hammer (2022) – Ron Yue

=== Original video animation (OVA) ===
- Legend of the Galactic Heroes (1988) – Wolfgang Mittermeyer
- Record of Lodoss War (1990) – Shadam
- JoJo's Bizarre Adventure (1993) – Jean Pierre Polnareff
- Mobile Suit Gundam Unicorn: Episode 4 (2011) – Diner Owner

=== Animated films ===
- Science Ninja Team Gatchaman: The Movie (1978)
- Twelve Months (1980) – April
- Future War 198X (1982) – Smirnov
- Odin: Photon Sailer Starlight (1985) – Mitsuo Itami
- Saint Seiya: Legend of Crimson Youth (1988) – Lynx Jaō
- Saint Seiya: Warriors of the Final Holy War (1989) – Seraph Beelzebub
- Doraemon: Nobita and the Animal Planet (1990) – General Nimuge

=== Video games ===
- Ys I & II (1989) – Dark Fact
- Gihren no Yabou series (1998–) – Garma Zabi
- Kessen (2000) – Ishida Mitsunari
- Dragon Ball Z Budokai 3 (2005) – Nail
- Dragon Ball Z: Budokai Tenkaichi 3 (2007) – Nail
- Tatsunoko vs. Capcom (2008) – Ken the Eagle, Tekkaman

=== Dubbing ===
==== Live-action ====
- Ambulance – Papi (A Martinez)
- Crisis on Earth-X – Martin Stein / Firestorm (Victor Garber)
- Dolittle – Lord Thomas Badgley (Jim Broadbent)
- The Girl Next Door – Adult David Moran (William Atherton)
- Gone Girl – Rand Elliott (David Clennon)
- Harry Potter series – Horace Slughorn (Jim Broadbent)
- Hitman: Agent 47 – Dr. Piotr Litvenko (Ciarán Hinds)
- Hypnotic – Carl (Jeff Fahey)
- Jurassic World: Fallen Kingdom – Senator Sherwood (Peter Jason)
- The Lady in the Van – Underwood (Jim Broadbent)
- Mars Attacks! – Donald Kessler (Pierce Brosnan)
- Midway (1979 TBS edition) – Lieutenant Tom Garth (Edward Albert)
- Mirrors 2 – Jack Matheson (William Katt)
- Mr. Robot – Phillip Price (Michael Cristofer)
- Outlander – Colum MacKenzie (Gary Lewis)
- Patriots Day – Jeffrey Pugliese (J. K. Simmons)
- Robin Hood (2010) – William Marshal (William Hurt)
- Robin Hood (2018) – Cardinal Franklin (F. Murray Abraham)
- A Series of Unfortunate Events – The Man with a Beard but No Hair (Richard E. Grant)
- Speed Racer – Ben Burns (Richard Roundtree)
- White Collar – Reese Hughes (James Rebhorn)
- ZeroZeroZero – Don Damiano "Minu" La Piana (Adriano Chiaramida)

==== Animation ====
- Quest for Camelot – Lionel
- SWAT Kats: The Radical Squadron – Dr. Viper
- Thomas the Tank Engine & Friends – James the Red Engine (Seasons 1-8)
- Thomas and the Magic Railroad - James the Red Engine
- Pinocchio – Jiminy Cricket
- 101 Dalmatians – Truck Driver
- Yellow Submarine – Paul McCartney

=== Other roles ===
- Mezamashi TV – Narrator
