= Steamboy =

2004 Japanese animated action film directed by Katsuhiro Otomo

- Theatrical poster
- Directed by: Katsuhiro Otomo
- Screenplay by: Sadayuki Murai; Katsuhiro Otomo
- Story by: Katsuhiro Otomo
- Produced by: Shinji Komori; Hideyuki Tomioka
- Starring: Anne Suzuki; Manami Konishi; Katsuo Nakamura; Masane Tsukayama
- Cinematography: Mitsuhiro Satô
- Edited by: Takeshi Seyama
- Music by: Steve Jablonsky
- Production company: Sunrise
- Distributed by: Toho
- Release date: July 17, 2004 (Japan)
- Running time: 126 minutes
- Country: Japan
- Language: Japanese
- Budget: ¥2.4 billion ($26 million)
- Box office: $18.9 million

Steamboy (Japanese: スチームボーイ, Hepburn: Suchīmubōi) is a 2004 Japanese animated steampunk action film directed and co-written by Katsuhiro Otomo, produced by Sunrise, it is his second major anime as a director, following Akira (1988). The film was released in Japan by Toho on July 17, 2004.

Steamboy was the most expensive Japanese film ever produced, with a ¥2.4 billion ($26 million) production budget, having been in production for ten years and utilizing more than 180,000 drawings and 440 CG cuts.

== Plot ==
In 1863, where an alternate nineteenth-century Europe has made tremendous strides in steam-powered technologies, scientist Lloyd Steam and his son, Edward "Eddy" Steam, discover a pure mineral water in Iceland which they believe can be harnessed as an unlimited power source for steam engines. An experiment in Russian Alaska goes wrong, with Eddy being engulfed in freezing gases, but results in the creation of a spherical device. Three years later, Lloyd sends the device and its schematics to Eddy's son James Ray Steam, who works as a maintenance boy in Manchester, England, along with instructions to guard it. Members of the O'Hara Foundation arrive and attempt to steal the sphere, but Lloyd appears, stating that the device killed Eddy and bids Ray to flee and deliver the device to Robert Stephenson. After fleeing the O'Hara agents on his monowheel, Ray briefly meets Stephenson on a train headed into Manchester, but Ray, along with the device, are captured by O'Hara agents.

Ray is taken to London, where preparations are being made for the 1866 Great Exhibition, and meets Scarlett O'Hara St Johns, the spoiled granddaughter of the Foundation's head chairman, Charles O'Hara St Johns. He also discovers Eddy, alive but converted into a cyborg. Eddy has been working with O'Hara on the Steam Castle, an elaborate facility powered by three Steam Balls, one of which was the device sent to Ray. Ray is enamored by the castle and his father's vision of using it to enlighten mankind, and volunteers to help complete the project. He also develops a love/hate friendship with Scarlett, who seems to be attracted to him. Ray encounters Lloyd again, who was captured by O'Hara's henchmen, but has escaped from his cell and is attempting to sabotage the castle, revealing that the Foundation's true intention for the exhibition is to sell weapons of war. Lloyd shows Ray a hidden armory filled with steam-powered war machines built by Eddy, and Ray struggles with the moral dichotomy of being a scientist — of how to contribute to the world without giving into vanity, leaving him conflicted as to whether to side with Lloyd or Edward, who themselves have become estranged.

Lloyd and Ray reach the core of the castle and remove one of the Steam Balls, but Lloyd is shot and captured as Ray escapes with the device. The next morning, the exhibition is underway, and Ray brings the ball to Stephenson, giving him the ball and the knowledge he acquired in captivity. The British military attempts to arrest Eddy, but Eddy unleashes his steam-powered weapons on the soldiers, turning the exhibition into a battlefield. When Stephenson uses the Steam Ball to enhance his own company's tanks, Ray realizes that he had no better intentions than the Foundation. Eager to show the world the castle's true power, Eddy orders it to be prematurely activated. The castle sheds its shell, revealing it to be a floating fortress. As the Royal Navy and Stephenson attempt to defend London from the floating fortress, Ray steals the Steam Ball back and uses it to create a makeshift aircraft to re-board the fortress. Ray meets Eddy, Scarlett, and Lloyd in the castle's control room, where Lloyd confronts Eddy about his actions before shooting him in a fit of rage. Eddy falls into a cloud of steam and disappears.

With the castle steered off course, the structure has become unstable and threatens to explode. As Lloyd and Ray rush to redirect the castle over the Thames, Eddy, whose metal body repelled the gunshot, re-emerges from the steam and assists them, having realized his folly. Ray re-installs the stolen steam ball and makes his way to the control room to make a final escape with Scarlett on an emergency jetpack, while Eddy and Lloyd reconcile and halt the machine over the river and escape as well. The castle detonates, sparing the city from destruction. The ending montage reveals Ray returning home, and later becoming a global superhero using the jetpack gear from the castle; Lloyd introducing Ray to electricity before dying; Eddy founding a corporate conglomerate; Scarlett maturing and becoming a famous pilot, and a war being fought with paratroopers and zeppelins.

== Characters ==
James Ray Steam (ジェームス・レイ・スチム, Jēmusu Rei Suchimu)

- Voiced by: Anne Suzuki (Japanese); Anna Paquin (English)

The main character, a 13-year-old boy living in Manchester, is an inventor following the paths of his father and grandfather. He possesses a mechanical talent that was inherited from his family, and demonstrates this in at least two instances by building a steam-powered monowheel and a steam-propelled flying device. He has a youthful idealism and sincerely dislikes the employment of technology for harmful purposes. During the film his motivations are alternately swayed by the influences of his father and grandfather.
Scarlett O'Hara St. Johns (スカーレット・オハラ・セントジョーンズ, Sukāretto Ohara Sentojōnzu)

- Voiced by: Manami Konishi (Japanese); Kari Wahlgren (English)

Selfish, spoiled, misguided, yet whimsical and not completely heartless; she is the American 14-year-old granddaughter of the chairman of the O'Hara Foundation. She matures as a result of her encounter with Ray. Her character is based upon the fictional character of the same name, from the novel Gone with the Wind.
Lloyd Steam (ロイド・スチム, Roido Suchimu)

- Voiced by: Katsuo Nakamura (Japanese); Patrick Stewart (English)

Ray's idealistic grandfather. The original conceiver of the Steamball, which he succeeds in developing with his son Edward. Lloyd's pursuit of progress without much regards to safety and ignorance of Eddy's pleading directly leads to his son's disfigurement. A difference of opinions with his son Edward leads to friction between them. While Edward believes that science is an instrument of power, Lloyd simply wishes to use it to help people. They both develop distinctly different visions for their ultimate invention, the Steam Castle. It is later revealed that Lloyd intended the Steam Castle to be a sort of flying amusement park, but Eddy scoffed at such a premise, denouncing it as a "fairy tale vision". Edward instead built the Steam Castle as a flying military fortress.
Edward Steam (Eddy) (エドワード・スチム（エディ）, Edowādo Suchimu (Edi))

- Voiced by: Masane Tsukayama (Japanese); Alfred Molina (English)

Ray's father. The accident that occurred in the development of the Steamball left Edward in a state where he needed to have machinery replace some of his body, including his right arm and parts of his legs. It left him not only physically disfigured, but it severely twisted his morals as well, driving him to believe that science is an expression of mankind's ultimate power. Edward's father calls him Eddy. He uses the Foundation and the Exhibition as a springboard to launch his ultimate invention: a monstrous, flying war machine called the Steam Castle.
Robert Stephenson (ロバート・スチーブンスン, Robāto Suchībunsun)

- Voiced by: Kiyoshi Kodama (Japanese); Oliver Cotton (English)

Edward and Lloyd Steam's friend and rival, a major player in the Industrial Revolution. He claims that he wishes to use the Steam Ball for the good of the British Empire, but exactly how he plans to do it is questionable. Possibly based upon the real-life Robert Stephenson.
David (デイビッド, Deibiddo)

- Voiced by: Ikki Sawamura (Japanese); Robin Atkin Downes (English)

A young, talented engineer who is Robert Stephenson's loyal right hand.
Archibald Simon (アーチボルド・サイモン, Āchiborudo Saimon)

- Voiced by: Satoru Sato (Japanese); Rick Zieff (English)

The O'Hara Foundation's chairman's representative, whose duties also seems to be Miss Scarlett's caretaker and personal servant; he is overweight and wears glasses. Grossly obsessed with money, he continues to market his wares even when his life is in danger, with comical results.
Alfred Smith (アルフレッド・スミス, Arufureddo Sumisu)

- Voiced by: Susumu Terajima (Japanese); Mark Bramhall (English)

The smarter of the two O'Hara thugs, Alfred works with Jason in trying to steal the Steamball. He outlives his oafish companion, and seems to hate Ray even more. He, along with Jason, performs much of Simon's dirty work. The two of them capture Ray and bring him to London, and later attempt to kill him. Alfred does so by trying to smash him with a construction crane, but Ray deftly avoids it, causing it to slam into Alfred instead.
Jason (ジェイソン, Jeison)

- Voiced by: Tetsu Inada (Japanese); David S. Lee (English)

One of the men working in the O'Hara Foundation in the United States of America. Jason and Alfred were the ones that want to get the Steamball. However, Ray Steam is kidnapped. He represents the more brutish half of the two O'Hara thugs, and engages in a vicious aerial battle with Ray toward the end of the movie.
Ray's Mother (レイの母親, Rei no Hahaoya)

- Voiced by: Keiko Aizawa (Japanese); Kim Thomson (English)

Ray's mother who volunteers as a teacher for children.
Emma (エマ, Ema)

- Voiced by: Sanae Kobayashi (Japanese); Paula J. Newman (English)

A friend of Ray's.
Thomas (トーマス, Tōmasu)

- Voiced by: Aiko Hibi (Japanese); Moira Quirk (English)

Emma's brother.
The Admiral

- Voiced by: Osamu Saka (Japanese); Oliver Muirhead (English)

Highly decorated and a Knight of the Order of the Garter, the Admiral is Robert Stephenson's main point of contact with the British Government. The Admiral is rather set in his ways, believing that men, not machines, fight wars. He displays a stereotypically British style of composure, calmly taking afternoon tea on the deck of his flagship while a battle rages nearby.

== Production ==
Katsuhiro Otomo first completed a proposal of Steamboy as an original video animation of three 40-minute episodes on June 30, 1994. The pilot storyboard was completed in July of the following year. The film was in production for ten years and utilized more than 180,000 drawings and 440 CG cuts. It had a production budget of ¥2.4 billion, then equivalent to $26,000,000 (equivalent to $44,000,000 in 2025). This made it the most expensive Japanese anime film up until then, surpassing Otomo's Metropolis (2001).

== Media ==
The Japanese release of Steamboy featured the voices of Anne Suzuki, Manami Konishi and Masane Tsukayama. The United States release, held in a limited number of U.S. theaters on March 18, 2005, and expanded to additional theaters on March 25, was released in two formats: a subtitled release featured in fewer cinemas, and an English dubbed version cut down by 15 minutes that featured the voices of Anna Paquin, Alfred Molina, and Patrick Stewart.

Steamboy was distributed across Japan by Toho and English regions by Sony's Triumph Films subsidiary. The VHS and DVD was released in Japan on April 15, 2005, in Australia on June 22, 2005, the USA on July 26, 2005, and the UK on March 27, 2006. Both the edited English version and the original Japanese version were made available on DVD, with the longer version being sold as the Director's Cut. The UK Blu-ray/DVD combo version of the film is the original, full length version. However, it has been misprinted as the cut down version of the film. The trailer and DVD menu both make use of the song "Full Force" by John Powell.

=== Video game ===
Steamboy was later adapted into a video game for the PlayStation 2 in Japan by Bandai. (Development by Cavia and SIMS)

== Release ==
Steamboy was released in Japan on July 17, 2004, alongside Pokémon: Destiny Deoxys where it was distributed by Toho. The film was released in the United States by Triumph Films with an English-language dub on March 18, 2005, prior to this, TriStar Pictures was going to release the movie. The film was released to home video in the United States by Sony Pictures Home Entertainment (via Triumph Films and Destination Films) with an English-language dub and the original Japanese version with English subtitles on July 26, 2005.

== Reception ==
=== Box office ===
In Japan, the film grossed ¥1.16 billion, making it the 18th highest-grossing domestic film of 2004. The film was not a box office success in the United States, where it grossed $468,867 in 2005.

According to the reviewer KJB at IGN this could be due to the marketing methods used and the incredibly small limited release in the United States. Steamboy could have had a larger Western audience, but due to the limited release, that was not able to happen. "Steamboy is one of those few anime films that would be able to play to a wide audience in the United States. Instead, the film is getting a limited release through Sony's smaller label, skipping some cities entirely and only playing in smaller art houses in many of the cities that are getting the film."

=== Critical response ===
The movie received positive reviews. Review aggregation website Rotten Tomatoes gave Steamboy a rating of 61% based on over 90 reviews, and an average rating of 6.1/10, with the site's consensus "The story isn't the greatest, but there's an abundance of sci-fi eye candy to compensate." Metacritic assigned the film a weighted average score of 66 out of 100, based on 32 critics, indicating "generally favorable reviews". Steamboy was the 2004 recipient of Best Animated Feature Film at the Sitges - Catalan International Film Festival.

Stephen Hunter of The Washington Post states, "the movie turns out to be one of those science-fiction pieces that is drawn from a peculiar moment in science, so the fiction has a historical sense to it. Steamboy clearly means to be a critique of Western culture: It uses issues such as industrialism, domination, mass destruction, ambition and despotism as a background to what feels like a boys' book adventure". The film received overall positive reviews from reviewers.

== See also ==
- List of most expensive animated films

== Bibliography ==
- Galbraith IV, Stuart (2008). The Toho Studios Story: A History and Complete Filmography. Scarecrow Press. ISBN 978-1-4616-7374-3.
