= Microid S =

Japanese manga series

ミクロイドZ / ミクロイドS (Microid Z / Microid S)
- Manga

Microid Z
- Written by: Osamu Tezuka
- Published by: Akita Shoten
- Magazine: Weekly Shōnen Champion
- Original run: March 26, 1973 – September 3, 1973
- Anime television series
- Directed by: Masayuki Akehi
- Written by: Masaki Tsuji
- Music by: Goh Misawa
- Studio: Toei Animation
- Original network: ANN (NET)
- Original run: 7 April 1973 – 6 October 1973
- Episodes: 26

Microid S (ミクロイドS, Mikuroido Esu) is a manga series written and illustrated by Osamu Tezuka, published in Akita Shoten's Weekly Shōnen Champion from March to September 1973. It was later adapted into an anime series by Toei.

The anime adaption of Tezuka's manga Microid Z (ミクロイドZ, Mikuroido Zetto), replaced the letter "Z" with an "S" as to match the initial letter of the show's sponsor, Seiko. It consisted of 26 episodes and was originally broadcast on TV Asahi.

The series is known as Microsuperman in Italy.

== Cast ==
- Makio Inoue as Yanma the Dragonfly Man, leader of the miniature Microids who are humans shrunk to insect size by the evil Gidoron but escaped wearing winged super-suits they use to protect humanity.
- Hiroko Suzuki as Ageha the Butterfly Girl.
- Machiko Soga as Mamezo the Beetle Boy.
- Yasuaki Suzuki as Dr. Midoro, Nobel Prize-winning scientist who befriends the tiny heroes.
- Ichirô Nagai as Gidoron, ruthless ruler of a highly advanced insect empire beneath the Arizona desert who sends his army of ant-like Gidrons and other mutant bug monsters to conquer the world and purge it of pollution-causing humans.
- Jouji Yanami as Teacher Noracura
- Kaneta Kimotsuki as Kankuro
- Masako Nozawa as Manabu, Dr. Midoro's son
- Kei Tomiyama as Ruriboshi
