= Keiko Aizawa =

Japanese voice actress

- 相沢 恵子
- Born: November 22, 1963 (age 62); Kanagawa Prefecture, Japan
- Occupations: Actress; voice actress
- Years active: 1996–present
- Agent: Gekidan Subaru
- Height: 165 cm (5 ft 5 in)
- Spouse: Shigeru Ushiyama

Keiko Aizawa (相沢恵子, Aizawa Keiko; born November 22, 1963) is a Japanese actress who specializes in voice acting. She is affiliated with the Gekidan Subaru production company. She is married to Shigeru Ushiyama, an actor who also with Gekidan Subaru. Aizawa is originally from Kanagawa Prefecture.

== Filmography ==
=== Anime ===
==== Television ====
- Boogiepop Phantom (2000), Kanae Oikawa
- Gensomaden Saiyuki (2000), Dr. Huang
- Detective Conan (2001), Hanaoka Reiko (ep 260)
- Last Exile (2003), Justina Valca (ep 15)
- Saiyuki Reload (2003), Dr. Huang
- Saiyuki Reload Gunlock (2004), Dr. Hwang
- Maria-sama ga Miteru: Haru (2004), Sayako Ogasawara (eps 1, 13)
- Sakura Taisen: Le Nouveau Paris (2004 OVA), Isabelle "Grand Mere" Lyotte
- Emma: A Victorian Romance (2005), Mrs. Campbell
- Emma: A Victorian Romance Second Act (2007), Mrs. Campbell

==== Films ====
- Steamboy (2004), Ray's Mother
- The Girl Who Leapt Through Time (2006), Answering Machine Voice, Infirmary Teacher-in-charge

==== Original video animations ====
- Sakura Taisen: Ecole de Paris (2003), Isabel "Grand Mere" Lilac
- Sakura Taisen: Le Nouveau Paris (2004), Isabel "Grand Mere" Lilac

==== Video games ====
- Sakura Wars 3: Is Paris Burning (2001), Isabel "Grand Mere" Lilac
- Sakura Wars 4: Fall in Love, Maidens (2002), Isabel "Grand Mere" Lilac
- Lifeline (2003), Helen Johnson

=== Dubbing roles ===
==== TV series (regular appearance) ====
- The X-Files (1994), Dana Scully (Gillian Anderson)
- ER (1995), Diane Leeds (Lisa Zane)
- Stargate SG-1 (1997), Vala Mal Doran (Claudia Black)
- Third Watch (2000), Faith Yokas (Molly Price)
- Brothers & Sisters (2006), Sarah Walker (Rachel Griffiths)
- The Fall (2013), Stella Gibson (Gillian Anderson)
- The Good Doctor (2018), Dr. Audrey Lim (Christina Chang)

==== Films ====
- Tango & Cash (1990), Katherine 'Kiki' Tango, on TV broadcast version dub
- Demolition Man (1993), Lenina Huxley (Sandra Bullock)
- Heart and Souls (1993), Anne (Elisabeth Shue)
- Point of No Return (1993), Maggie Hayward (Bridget Fonda)
- Timecop (1995), Melissa Walker (Mia Sara)
- Village of the Damned (1995), Dr. Susan Verner (Kirstie Alley)
- Looking for Richard (1996), Lady Anne (Winona Ryder)
- Asteroid (1997), Dr. Lily McKee (Annabella Sciorra)
- Cliffhanger (1997), Jessie Deighan (Janine Turner)
- The Crow (1997), Shelly Webster (Sofia Shinas), on TV Tokyo dub
- Tomorrow Never Dies (1998), Paris Carver
- The X-Files (1998), Dana Scully (Gillian Anderson)
- The Man in the Iron Mask (1998), Christine Bellefort (Judith Godrèche)
- A Bug's Life (1999), The Queen (Phyllis Diller)
- The Cell (2000), Dr. Catherine Deane (Jennifer Lopez)
- Man on the Moon (2000), Lynne Margulies (Courtney Love)
- X-Men (2000), Storm (Halle Berry)
- In the Mood for Love (2001), Su Li-zhen (Maggie Cheung)
- Hide and Seek (2005), Allison Callaway, on TV broadcast version dub
- Firewall (2006), Beth Stanfield (Virginia Madsen)
- La Vie en rose (2007), Titine (Emmanuelle Seigner)
- The X-Files: I Want to Believe (2008), Dana Scully (Gillian Anderson)
- Angels & Demons (2009), Dr. Vittoria Vetra (Ayelet Zurer)
- Last Light (2009), Hope Whitmore (Lynne Moody)
- Psycho (2010), Lila Crane (Vera Miles)
- The East (2013), Paige Williams (Julia Ormond)
- Saving Mr. Banks (2013), Aunt Ellie (Rachel Griffiths)
- Robot Overlords (2014), Kate (Gillian Anderson)
- Boychoir (2014), Ms. Steel (Debra Winger)

==== TV series (guest appearance) ====
Other TV series in which Aizawa dubbed for either sub-regular casts or guest include: Star Trek: Voyager, CSI: Miami (Season 2, episode 4)
