= Nobuyuki Katsube =

Japanese actor and voice actor (born 1938)

- Born: May 23, 1938 (age 88); Tokyo, Japan
- Occupations: Actor, voice actor
- Years active: 1966-present

Nobuyuki Katsube (勝部 演之, Katsube Nobuyuki; born May 23, 1938) is a Japanese actor and voice actor. He graduated from Keio University.and the Faculty of Economics.

== Filmography ==
=== Film ===
- Japan's Longest Day (1967) (Michinori Shiraishi)
- Violent Cop (1989) (Deputy Police Chief Higuchi)
- Spellbound (1999) (Ōta)
- Kumiko, the Treasure Hunter (2014) (Sakagami)
- Voices of Loved One (2024)

=== Television dramas ===
- NHK Taiga drama
  - San Shimai (1967) (Jinbo Matashichiro)
  - Ryōma ga Yuku (1968) (Tōdō Heisuke)
  - Ten to Chi to (1969) (Shimodaira Shurinosuke)
  - Katsu Kaishū (1974) (Ueda Otojiro)
  - Genroku Taiheiki (1975) (Matsumae Yoshihiro)
  - Kashin (1977) (Toriyama Shinzaburo)
  - Ōgon no Hibi (1978) (Kuroda Kanbei)
  - Tōge no Gunzō (1982) (Okado Denpachiro)
  - Tokugawa Ieyasu (1983) (Hayashi Hidesada)
  - Haruno Hatō (1985) (Kichizo Nakamura)
  - Dokuganryū Masamune (1987) (Gotō Matabei)
  - Homura Tatsu (1993) (Adachi Morinaga)
  - Tokugawa Yoshinobu (1998) (Kawaji Toshiakira)
- Daichūshingura (1971)
- Sanbiki ga Kiru! (1988)
- Dr. Coto's Clinic (2003)

=== Television animation ===
- Monster (2004) (Roberto)
- Persona : Trinity Soul (2008) (Mariya Kujou, Keisuke Komatsubara)

=== Video games ===
- Final Fantasy XV (2016) (Cid Sophiar)

=== OVA ===
- Master Keaton (1999) (Prof. Takakura)

=== Theatrical animation ===
- 009 Re:Cyborg (2012) (Prof. Isaac Gilmore)
- Berserk Golden Age Arc I: The Egg of the King (2012) (King of Midland)
- Berserk Golden Age Arc II: The Battle for Doldrey (2012) (King of Midland)
- Berserk Golden Age Arc III: The Advent (2013) (King of Midland)

=== Dubbing roles ===
==== Live-action ====
- 300: Rise of an Empire (Darius I (Igal Naor))
- 42 (Branch Rickey (Harrison Ford))
- Blackway (Lester (Anthony Hopkins))
- The Bucket List (Edward Cole (Jack Nicholson))
- Bullitt (1977 TV Asahi edition) (Delgetti (Don Gordon))
- Cinderella Man (James Johnston (Bruce McGill))
- Coming 2 America (King Jaffe Joffer (James Earl Jones))
- Crime 101 (Money (Nick Nolte))
- Delivery Man (Mikolaj Wozniak (Andrzej Blumenfeld))
- Dolphin Tale (Reed Haskett (Kris Kristofferson))
- Dune (Baron Vladimir Harkonnen (Stellan Skarsgård))
- Dune: Part Two (Baron Vladimir Harkonnen (Stellan Skarsgård))
- Edge of Tomorrow (General Brigham (Brendan Gleeson))
- Elizabeth (Francis Walsingham (Geoffrey Rush))
- Elizabeth: The Golden Age (Francis Walsingham (Geoffrey Rush))
- Goal! (Erik Dornhelm (Marcel Iureș))
- The Jacket (Dr. Thomas Becker (Kris Kristofferson))
- John Wick: Chapter 2 (Julius (Franco Nero))
- The Last Word (Edward (Philip Baker Hall))
- Lifeforce (2005 TV Asahi edition) (Dr. Hans Fallada (Frank Finlay))
- Lucky Number Slevin (The Boss (Morgan Freeman))
- Nebraska (Woodrow T. Grant (Bruce Dern))
- The Notebook (Old Noah Calhoun (James Garner))
- Parker (Hurley (Nick Nolte))
- Paul, Apostle of Christ (Paul (James Faulkner))
- Pirates of the Caribbean: On Stranger Tides (Edward "Blackbeard" Teach (Ian McShane))
- Red 2 (Dr. Edward Bailey (Anthony Hopkins))
- Rémi sans famille (Elder Rémi (Jacques Perrin))
- The Surprise (Cornald Muller (Jan Decleir))
- Touch (Professor Arthur Teller (Danny Glover))
- The Tourist (Reginald Shaw (Steven Berkoff))
- Transformers: Dark of the Moon (Sentinel Prime (Leonard Nimoy))
- The Undoing (Franklin Reinhardt (Donald Sutherland))
- Veronica Guerin (John Gilligan (Gerard McSorley))
- Warrior (Paddy Conlon (Nick Nolte))
- Watchmen (Will Reeves (Louis Gossett Jr.))

==== Animation ====
- Toy Story 3 (Lots-O'-Huggin' Bear)
