= 009 Re:Cyborg =

2012 film by Kenji Kamiyama

- Film poster
- Directed by: Kenji Kamiyama
- Screenplay by: Kenji Kamiyama
- Based on: Cyborg 009 by Shotaro Ishinomori
- Produced by: Tomohiko Ishii
- Starring: Mamoru Miyano; Noriaki Sugiyama; Hiroyuki Yoshino; Tarou Masuoka; Teruyuki Tanzawa; Toru Ohkawa; Chiwa Saito; Daisuke Ono; Sakiko Tamagawa
- Cinematography: Takahiro Uezono
- Edited by: Atsunori Sato
- Music by: Kenji Kawai
- Production companies: Production I.G; Sanzigen
- Distributed by: T-Joy
- Release date: October 27, 2012
- Running time: 105 minutes
- Country: Japan
- Language: Japanese

009 Re:Cyborg is a 2012 Japanese anime film by Kenji Kamiyama. The film takes place in Cyborg 009's future timeline. The 2016 anime film trilogy Cyborg 009: Call of Justice is a sequel with Kamiyama serving as Chief Director.

== Plot ==
The year is 2013. Skyscraper bombings are happening all over the world, by the direction of a force called "His Voice". 27 years after the 00 Cyborg team disbanded, 007 now works for the British SIS and 002 now works for the National Security Agency (NSA) after a falling out with the team and Joe. The two agents meet at a bar in New York City to exchange intel about "His Voice" and Pyunma's findings of a fossil which resembles an angel's skeleton possibly being related to it. The intelligence agencies of the world are all whispering about the incidents being related to His Voice, the unknown entity that is controlling operatives of the bombings.

Joe Shimamura, who had his memories blocked and reset every 3 years by Professor Gilmore, is now a typical high school student, falsely believing that he has an unseen family and friends due to the "Augmented Reality" implanted in his brain. He also has a girlfriend named Tomoe, who seems familiar to him in some way. However, Joe is hearing His Voice due to his cybernetic brain. We learn that he was about to plant a bomb at the Roppongi Hills Tower, until 005 and 003 came to reactivate his memories. Dr. Isaac Gilmore suspects that these were orchestrated by the United States government's National Security Agency, in a bid to regain dominance as a global superpower.

In Dubai, a B-2 bomber flown by a US Air Force pilot under the control of His Voice launches missiles at the city, with 002 in pursuit to intercept. 009 appears and uses his Acceleration mode to destroy the missiles. After 009 gets knocked off the plane by 002 in a fight, the pilot fires a nuclear bomb which destroys the entire city and kills the population of Dubai. 009 uses his Acceleration Mode to outrun the blast, but is left unconscious and lying on the beach. In his mind, he pictures himself in the burned out city, despondent over his failure. Tomoe appears to comfort him, and remind him of his purpose. Due to the EMP effects of the nuclear blast, communications are down and the team thinks Joe is dead.

Nuclear missiles are fired and 003 fires interceptors and disables all of them except for one. With no time to lose, Joe requests 001 to teleport him into space to disarm the missile. 001 agrees but states he will be unable to return him to Earth at that distance, as Ivan would exhaust his power doing so.

002 flies up to try to help 009 but ends up burning out his rockets and damaging his stabilizers, causing him to plummet towards Earth. Joe then speaks to God and says that while humanity is foolish and causes suffering towards each other, he believes in them because they have such great potential to go beyond those vices and make their dreams become reality. He then pleads to him that the earth be spared, only for the bomb to detonate in space with Joe on top of it, the light of the explosion forming a cross. Francoise watches two falling stars, and silently prays upon both.

After some indeterminate point of time, Joe finds himself waking up in an apartment in a place that appears to be Venice, and sees Francoise walking across a canal. She explains that he's in her "safe house". Jet, Great Britain, and Pyunma also find themselves in the mysterious city, which Dr. Gilmore explains is the world created by His Voice. Back in the safe house, Joe and Fran talk about God for a bit and then the camera pans behind them to reveal that one of the angel skeletons is in her living room as a decoration.

The movie's final shot after the credits roll ends with the image of an angel skeleton on the surface of the Moon.

== Voice Cast ==
Character	Japanese voice actor	English voice actor
009	Mamoru Miyano	Jason Griffith
008	Noriaki Sugiyama	Marcus Griffin
007	Hiroyuki Yoshino	John White
006	Tarou Masuoka	Michael Sorich
005	Teruyuki Tanzawa	Patrick Seitz
004	Toru Ohkawa	Dave B. Mitchell
003	Chiwa Saito	Erin Fitzgerald
002	Daisuke Ono	Marc Diraison
001	Sakiko Tamagawa	Stephanie Sheh
Professor Gilmore	Nobuyuki Katsube	George C. Cole

== Development ==
The 2010 3DCG short 009: The Reopening directed by Mamoru Oshii served as a lead in to this project. The 3DCG movie, produced by Production I.G. and Sanzigen in partnership with Ishimori Entertainment, was released on October 27, 2012, in Japan in both 2D and RealD 3D. Kenji Kamiyama is the director and writer. Kenji Kawai, who has worked before with Kamiyama on Moribito: Guardian of the Spirit and Eden of the East, is composing the music. It also opened simultaneously in more than five Asian regions, including Hong Kong, Taiwan, Singapore, Malaysia, and South Korea. An expanded and somewhat different six-volume manga adaptation by Gatou Asou, character designer for Moribito and Occult Academy, was serialized in Square Enix's Monthly Big Gangan from 2012 to 2015. The UK anime distributor Anime Limited has announced that they have acquired the movie and will produce an English dub at NYAV Post. Madman Entertainment also has rights to release the film in Australia and New Zealand. At Anime Expo 2013, Funimation had announced that they acquired the film for North America. The UK release of 009 Re:Cyborg was delayed during January 2014 due to a delay in the completion of the English dub of the film.

The film was heavily influenced by Mamoru Oshii's cancelled Lupin the Third film, reusing elements of its plot such as the angel fossils, the giant tower in Tokyo, and the questioning of the main character's identity.
