= Hiroko Suzuki (voice actress) =

Japanese actress (born 1944)

- 鈴木 弘子
- Born: February 10, 1944 (age 82); Yamagata Prefecture, Japan
- Education: Aoyama Gakuin University
- Occupations: Actress; voice actress
- Years active: 1950–present
- Agent: Ken Production
- Height: 155 cm (5 ft 1 in)

Hiroko Suzuki (鈴木 弘子, Suzuki Hiroko; born February 10, 1944) is a Japanese actress from Yamagata Prefecture, Japan. In 2011, she received the Seiyu Awards.

== Filmography ==
=== Anime television ===
- Cyborg 009 (1968) - 003/Francoise Arnoul
- Microsuperman - Ageha
- X (2001–2002) - Former Family Head
- Ai Yori Aoshi (2002) - Mayu's mother
- Naruto (2013) - White Snake Sage
- Boruto: Naruto Next Generations (2018) - White Snake Sage

Unknown date

- Anne of Green Gables - Miss Stacy
- The Adventures of Pepero - Pepero
- Ie Naki Ko - Barbran Mama
- Oniisama e... - Nanako's mother
- Kin'iro no Corda - Yunoki's grandmother
- Ginban Kaleidoscope - Yukie Mishiro
- Crayon Shin-chan - Clover Kindergarten Principal
  - Legend of the Super Galaxy - Tamara
- Chinpui - Yuri Kasuga
- Peter Pan no Boken - Elizabeth Darling
- Belle et Sébastien - Narration
- Detective Conan - Elena Miyano
- Lupin III - Linda, Madam X

=== Animated films ===
- Do It! Yasuji's Pornorama (1971) - Yukiko
- Detective Conan: Crossroad in the Ancient Capital (2003) (Tae Yamakura)

=== Original video animation ===
- Glass Mask (1998) (Utako Himekawa)

=== Dubbing ===
==== Live-action ====
- Jacqueline Bisset
  - The Life and Times of Judge Roy Bean (Rose Bean)
  - Murder on the Orient Express (Countess Elena Andrenyi)
  - Who Is Killing the Great Chefs of Europe? (Natasha O'Brien)
  - When Time Ran Out (Kay Kirby)
  - Wild Orchid (1992 TV Asashi edition) (Claudia Dennis)
  - Domino (Sophie Wynn)
- Candice Bergen
  - Soldier Blue (1976 Fuji TV edition) (Cresta Maribel Lee)
  - Carnal Knowledge (Susan)
  - Rich and Famous (Merry Noel Blake)
  - Gandhi (1987 Fuji TV edition) (Margaret Bourke-White)
  - The In-Laws (Judy Tobias)
  - View from the Top (Sally Weston)
- Diane Keaton
  - The Godfather (1976 NTV edition) (Kay Adams Corleone)
  - The Godfather Part II (1980 NTV edition) (Kay Adams Corleone)
  - The Godfather Part III (VHS and 1994 Fuji TV editions) (Kay Adams Corleone)
  - Marvin's Room (Bessie)
  - Town & Country (Ellie Stoddard)
  - Crossed Over (Beverly Lowry)
- 8 Women (Gaby (Catherine Deneuve))
- Adaptation (Susan Orlean (Meryl Streep))
- Airport 1975 (Nancy Pryor (Karen Black))
- Alien (1980 Fuji TV/1981 Laserdisc edition) (Lambert (Veronica Cartwright))
- Aliens (1988 TBS edition) (Ripley (Sigourney Weaver))
- The BFG (Queen Elizabeth II (Penelope Wilton))
- Black Moon Rising (1988 TV Asashi edition) (Nina (Linda Hamilton))
- The Brand New Testament (Martine (Catherine Deneuve))
- Charmed (Melinda, Julie)
- Cinderella (Narrator)
- Cujo (1986 TBS edition) (Donna Trenton (Dee Wallace))
- Dancer in the Dark (Cathy (Catherine Deneuve))
- The Darjeeling Limited (Patricia (Anjelica Huston))
- Desperate Housewives (Stella)
- Dracula (1982 TV Asahi edition) (Lucy Seward (Kate Nelligan))
- Dune (Lady Jessica (Francesca Annis))
- The Evening Star (Aurora Greenway (Shirley MacLaine))
- Ghostbusters (Tina)
- The Giver (The Chief Elder (Meryl Streep))
- Home Alone 2: Lost in New York (1997 Fuji TV edition) (Kate (Catherine O'Hara))
- Ironside (Fran Belding)
- Jingle All the Way (2000 Fuji TV edition) (Liz Langston (Rita Wilson))
- Julie & Julia (Julia Child (Meryl Streep))
- Kramer vs. Kramer (Margaret Phelps (Jane Alexander))
- Martha Stewart Living (Martha Stewart)
- Mission: Impossible (Casey)
- Never Say Never Again (Fatima)
- Potiche (Suzanne Pujol (Catherine Deneuve))
- Prison Break (Caroline Reynolds)
- Scanners (1987 NTV edition) (Kim Obrist (Jennifer O'Neill))
- Scrooged (Grace Cooley (Alfre Woodard))
- Stargate SG-1 (Samantha Carter)
- Star Wars: Episode I – The Phantom Menace (Shmi Skywalker (Pernilla August))
- Star Wars: Episode II – Attack of the Clones (Shmi Skywalker (Pernilla August))
- Superman III (1985 TV Asahi edition) (Lana Lang (Annette O'Toole))
- Titanic (Ruth Dewitt Bukater (Frances Fisher))
- The Wonder Years (Norma Arnold)

==== Animation ====
- Josie and the Pussycats (Alexandra Cabot)
