= Ryō Ishihara =

Japanese voice actor and narrator (1931–2025)

Toshiyuki Fujii (Japanese: 藤井 寿之, Hepburn: Fujii Toshiyuki; March 31, 1931 – December 14, 2025), better known by the stage name Ryō Ishigari (石原 良, Ishihara Ryō), was a Japanese voice actor and narrator represented by Aoni Production. He was born in Kumamoto, Kumamoto on March 31, 1931, and died from heart failure on December 14, 2025, at the age of 94.

== Notable voice work ==
=== Anime television series ===
- Yuusei Kamen (Atlantar)
- Sally the Witch (1966) (Akira Yamabe)
- Cyborg 009 (1968) (002/Jet Link)
- Kyoujin no Hoshi (Seiichi Shima)
- Kick no Oni (Narration)
- Space Carrier Blue Noah (Narration)

=== Anime films ===
- Cyborg 009
  - Cyborg 009/Cyborg 009: Monster Wars (002/Jet Link)
  - Cyborg 009: Legend of the Super Galaxy (Narration)
- Future War 198X (Narration)

=== Dub work ===
- The FBI (Jim Rose)

=== Radio dramas ===
- Toward the Terra (Soldier Blue, Narration)

=== Puppet shows ===
- Uchuusen Shirika (Skipper Bob)
- Supercar (Mike Mercury)
- Captain Scarlet and the Mysterons (Doctor Fawn)
