= Arihiro Fujimura =

Japanese actor and voice actor (1934-1982)

Arihiro Fujimura (藤村 有弘, Fujimura Arihiro; March 6, 1934 – March 16, 1982) was a Japanese comedian, television actor and voice actor. He starred in the 1961 NHK drama Wakai Kisetsu, as well as the series Hatoko no Umi. He originated the voice of Don Gabacho in the puppet show Hyokkori Hyoutanjima.

== Biography ==
Fujimura was born in Tokyo. As a comedian, he gained popularity for his "fake foreign language" act.

He died in 1982 of diabetes mellitus. In later life, his hometown was Kanda, Tokyo.

== Filmography ==
=== Films ===
- Harenchi Gakuen
- Lupin III: Strange Pychokinetic Strategy (Superintendent)

=== TV Drama ===
- I Am a Cat
- G-Men '75
- Shin Zatoichi
- Mito Kōmon
- Saiyuki II

=== Puppet Shows ===
- Hyokkori Hyoutanjima (Don Gervacio)
- Sky City 008 (Wise man)

=== Anime ===
- Cyborg 009 1960s films (006/Chang Changku)
- Anderson Monogatari (Inspector)
- Nutcracker Fantasy (French Noble)

=== Other ===
- Appeared at the 16th and 24th Kōhaku Uta Gassen
