= Shigeru Ushiyama =

Japanese voice actor

- 牛山 茂
- Born: January 25, 1952 (age 74); Nagano Prefecture, Japan
- Occupations: Actor; voice actor
- Years active: 1977–present
- Agent: Theatre Company Subaru
- Spouse: Keiko Aizawa

Shigeru Ushiyama (牛山 茂, Ushiyama Shigeru; born January 25, 1952) is a Japanese actor who specializes in voice acting. He is affiliated with Gekidan Subaru and is married to fellow voice actress Keiko Aizawa.

== Filmography ==
=== Television animation ===
- Mobile Suit Gundam ZZ (1986) (Meccha Mucha)
- Ninku (1995) (General Maki)
- Meiken Lassie (1996) (Richard Jones)
- Rurouni Kenshin (1996) (Sakuramaru)
- Gensomaden Saiyuki (2000) (Shuuei) episodes 6 & 7
- Go! Go! Itsutsugo Land (2001) (Yurika's dad)
- Noir (2001) (Wellman)
- One Piece (2001) (Doctor Hiruluk)
- Tokyo Underground (2002) (Suijen)
- Phoenix (2004) (Robita)
- Tetsujin 28 (2004) (Professor Shikishima)
- Black Lagoon (2006) (Wentzel Ahbe)
- Spice and Wolf II (2009) (Lutz Eringin)
- Naruto Shippuden (2010) (Tazuna)
- Gate (2015) (Russian President Zyuganov)
- Shōwa Genroku Rakugo Shinjū (2016) (Matsuda)
- Ultraman (2019) (Alien Zetton Edo)
- Jujutsu Kaisen (2020) (Takeda)
- Yasuke (2021) (Abraham)
- Lazarus (2025) (Butler)

Unknown date

- Devil Lady (Production Manager)
- Fortune Quest L (Woodward)
- The Kindaichi Case Files (man)
- Yakitate!! Japan (Mash)

=== Theatrical animation ===
- Mobile Suit Gundam: Char's Counterattack (1988) (October Salan)
- Tetsujin 28: Hakuchū no Zangetsu (2007) (Professor Shikishima)
- One Piece: Episode of Chopper: Bloom in the Winter, Miracle Sakura (2008) (Dr. Hiriluk)
- In This Corner of the World (2016) (Entarō Hōjō)
- The Legend of the Galactic Heroes: Die Neue These Seiran (2019) (Baghdash)

=== Video games ===
- Kingdom Hearts (2002) (White Rabbit)
- Tales of Symphonia (2003) (Kvar)
- One Piece: Unlimited Adventure (2007) (Dr. Hiriluk)
- Xenoblade Chronicles 2 (2017) (Eulogimenos)
- Xenoblade Chronicles 2: Torna – The Golden Country (2018) (Tornan King)

=== Dubbing roles ===
==== Live-action ====
- William Fichtner
  - Heat (1998 TV Asahi edition) (Roger Van Zant)
  - The Underneath (Tommy Dundee)
  - Go (Burke)
  - Passion of Mind (Aaron Reilly)
  - The Perfect Storm (David "Sully" Sullivan)
  - Black Hawk Down (SFC Jeff Sanderson)
  - Crash (Flanagan)
- Kevin Pollak
  - A Few Good Men (Lieutenant Sam Weinberg)
  - Grumpy Old Men (Jacob Goldman)
  - House Arrest (Ned Beindorf)
  - Truth or Consequences, N.M. (Gordon Jacobson)
  - She's All That (Wayne Boggs)
- David Paymer
  - City Hall (Abe Goodman)
  - Amistad (Secretary of State John Forsyth)
  - Mighty Joe Young (2004 TV Asahi edition) (Harry Ruben)
  - Payback (2003 TV Asahi edition) (Arthur Stegman)
  - Ocean's Thirteen (2010 Fuji TV edition) (V.U.P.)
- Bill Paxton
  - Aliens (1993 TV Asahi edition) (Private William Hudson)
  - Monolith (Tucker)
  - True Lies (1996 Fuji TV edition) (Simon)
  - Vertical Limit (2003 TV Asahi edition) (Elliot Vaughn)
  - 2 Guns (Earl)
- David Schwimmer
  - Friends (Ross Geller)
  - Six Days Seven Nights (2001 Fuji TV edition) (Frank Martin)
  - Band of Brothers (Captain Herbert Sobel)
  - Big Nothing (Charlie)
- Tom Sizemore
  - Harley Davidson and the Marlboro Man (1993 TV Asahi edition) (Chance Wilder)
  - Point Break (1993 NTV edition) (DEA Agent Dietz)
  - True Romance (1999 TV Tokyo edition) (Cody Nicholson)
  - Heat (Michael Cheritto)
- Leland Orser
  - Seven (1998 Fuji TV edition) (Crazed Man in Massage Parlour)
  - Escape from L.A. (2000 Fuji TV edition) (Test Tube)
  - Taken (Sam)
  - Taken 2 (Sam)
- 28 Days (Cornell Shaw (Steve Buscemi))
- The 6th Day (Michael Drucker (Tony Goldwyn))
- Alien (1992 TV Asahi edition) (Kane (John Hurt))
- Aliens (2004 TV Asahi edition) (Lieutenant William Gorman (William Hope))
- Alien 3 (1998 TV Asahi edition) (Francis Aaron (Ralph Brown))
- Alien: Resurrection (Doctor Gediman (Brad Dourif))
- All About Eve (PDDVD edition) (Bill Simpson (Gary Merrill))
- Anaconda (1999 TV Asahi edition) (Warren Westridge (Jonathan Hyde))
- Antarctic Journal (Seo Jae-kyung (Choi Deok-moon))
- Arachnophobia (Sheriff Lloyd Parsons (Stuart Pankin))
- Australia (Neil Fletcher (David Wenham))
- Awakening the Zodiac (Harvey (Matt Craven))
- Bad Girls (William Tucker (James LeGros))
- The Ballad of Buster Scruggs (René (Saul Rubinek))
- Batman Begins (Judge Faden (Gerard Murphy), Fredericks (John Nolan))
- A Beautiful Mind (John Nash (Russell Crowe))
- Beverly Hills Cop III (Billy Rosewood (Judge Reinhold))
- Big Fat Liar (Marty Wolf (Paul Giamatti))
- The Big Lebowski (Blu-Ray edition) (Knox Harrington (David Thewlis))
- Big Night (Primo (Tony Shalhoub))
- Birdman (Riggan Thomson (Michael Keaton))
- Black Panther: Wakanda Forever (Anderson Cooper)
- Boomerang (Gerard Jackson (David Alan Grier))
- Brain Games (Ted Danson)
- Breaking Bad (Walter White (Bryan Cranston))
- Bridge of Spies (Wolfgang Vogel (Sebastian Koch))
- A Bridge Too Far (2007 DVD edition) (Brian Horrocks (Edward Fox))
- Call of Heroes (Tither Liu (Liu Kai-chi))
- Casablanca (2000 TV Tokyo edition) (Signor Ugarte (Peter Lorre))
- Casper (VHS edition) (Doctor Harvey (Bill Pullman)
- Casper (DVD edition) (Dibbs (Eric Idle))
- Celebrity (Lee Simon (Kenneth Branagh))
- Chain Reaction (Dr. Lu Chen (Tzi Ma))
- Cliffhanger (1997 NTV edition) (Matheson (Vyto Ruginis))
- Collateral Damage (Sean Armstrong (John Turturro))
- Coming to America (1991 Fuji TV edition) (Darryl Jenks (Eriq La Salle))
- Consenting Adults (David Duttonville (Forest Whitaker))
- The Core (2005 TV Asahi edition) (Doctor Conrad Zimsky (Stanley Tucci))
- Crash (Dr. Robert Vaughan (Elias Koteas))
- Crocodile Dundee (Richard Mason (Mark Blum))
- The Crown (Prince Edward, Duke of Windsor (Alex Jennings))
- Dark Blue World (Oberleutnant Hesse (Thure Riefenstein))
- Darkman (Peyton Westlake / Darkman (Liam Neeson))
- Das Boot (2004 TV Tokyo edition) (Obermaschinist Johann (Erwin Leder))
- The Day of the Jackal (Caron (Derek Jacobi))
- Desperado (1998 TV Asahi edition) (Pick-up Guy (Quentin Tarantino))
- Desperate Housewives (George Williams (Roger Bart))
- The Devil's Double (Munem)
- Die Hard (1990 TV Asahi edition) (Tony (Andreas Wisniewski))
- Die Hard with a Vengeance (1999 TV Asahi edition) (Ricky Walsh (Anthony Peck))
- Donnie Brasco (Sony edition) (Richie Gazzo (Rocco Sisto))
- Dr. Dolittle series (Lucky the Dog (Norm Macdonald))
- Bram Stoker's Dracula (1995 TV Asahi edition) (Doctor John Seward (Richard E. Grant)
- Bram Stoker's Dracula (VHS/DVD edition) (R.M. Renfield (Tom Waits))
- Entrapment (2007 TV Tokyo edition) (Hector Cruz (Will Patton))
- E.T. the Extra-Terrestrial (2002 DVD edition) (Keys (Peter Coyote))
- The Favourite (Sidney Godolphin (James Smith))
- Fly Away Home (David Alden (Terry Kinney))
- Frankenstein (Henry Clerval (Tom Hulce))
- Genius (Jost Winteler (Nicholas Rowe))
- Gentleman Jack (Christopher Rawson (Vincent Franklin))
- The Getaway (1994 TV Asahi edition) (Thief at the railway station (Richard Bright))
- Ghost (Willie Lopez (Rick Aviles))
- Ghostbusters (1999 DVD edition) (Doctor Egon Spengler (Harold Ramis))
- Ghostbusters II (1998 TV Asahi edition) (Doctor Janosz Poha (Peter MacNicol))
- The Godfather (2001 DVD-box and 2008 Blu-ray editions) (Fredo Corleone (John Cazale))
- The Godfather Part II (2001 DVD-box and 2008 Blu-ray editions) (Fredo Corleone (John Cazale))
- Godzilla (Charles Caiman (Harry Shearer))
- The Golden Compass (Fra Pavel (Simon McBurney))
- GoldenEye (1999 TV Asahi edition) (Boris Grishenko (Alan Cumming))
- The Green Mile (Eduard Delacroix (Michael Jeter))
- Heart and Souls (Thomas Reilly (Robert Downey Jr.))
- Hollow Man (2003 TV Asahi edition) (Frank Chase (Joey Slotnick))
- House on Haunted Hill (Steven Price (Geoffrey Rush))
- The Hunted (Kinjo (John Lone))
- Hunter Killer (Captain Sergei Andropov (Michael Nyqvist))
- Identity (2007 TV Tokyo edition) (George York (John C. McGinley))
- Independence Day (1999 TV Asahi edition) (Doctor Brackish Okun (Brent Spiner))
- Indiana Jones and the Temple of Doom (1998 TV Asahi edition) (Chattar Lal (Roshan Seth))
- The Infiltrator (Robert Mazur/Bob Musella (Bryan Cranston))
- In the Line of Fire (1996 TV Asahi edition) (Al D'Andrea (Dylan McDermott))
- Ip Man (Chow Ching-chuen (Simon Yam))
- Irréversible (Pierre (Albert Dupontel))
- Jacob's Ladder (Michael Newman (Matt Craven))
- JFK (Lee Harvey Oswald (Gary Oldman))
- John Q. (Jimmy Palumbo (David Thornton))
- Killing Me Softly (Senior Police Officer (Ian Hart))
- Landscapers (Christopher Edwards (David Thewlis))
- Last Action Hero (2001 TV Asahi edition) (The Ripper/Tom Noonan (Tom Noonan))
- The Last Boy Scout (1998 TV Asahi edition) (Milo (Taylor Negron))
- The Last Witch Hunter (Dolan 36 (Michael Caine))
- Law & Order (Jack McCoy (Sam Waterston))
- Lost (Benjamin Linus (Michael Emerson))
- The Lost World: Jurassic Park (Peter Ludlow (Arliss Howard))
- Mad Max 2 (1997 TV Asahi edition) (The Gyro Captain (Bruce Spence))
- Master and Commander: The Far Side of the World (Captain Jack Aubrey (Russell Crowe))
- A Midsummer Night's Dream (Puck (Stanley Tucci))
- Minority Report (Gideon (Tim Blake Nelson))
- The Misfits (Schultz (Tim Roth))
- Morbius (Alberto "Al" Rodriguez (Al Madrigal))
- Mortdecai (Spinoza (Paul Whitehouse))
- The Mustang (Myles (Bruce Dern))
- My Life Without Me (Dr. Thompson (Julian Richings))
- Nash Bridges (Inspector Harvey Leek (Jeff Perry))
- New Amsterdam (Dr. Vijay Kapoor (Anupam Kher))
- No Good Deed (David Brewster (Jonathan Higgins))
- Noel (Charles Boyd (Robin Williams))
- The Offer (Charles Bluhdorn (Burn Gorman))
- Once Upon a Time in China (So Sai-man (Jacky Cheung))
- Out of Reach (Mister Elgin (Nick Brimble))
- Outbreak (1998 NTV edition) (Casey Schuler (Kevin Spacey))
- Oz (Tobias Beecher (Lee Tergesen))
- Parenthood (1994 TV Tokyo edition) (Nathan Huffner (Rick Moranis))
- Peggy Sue Got Married (Charlie (Nicolas Cage))
- Phenomenon (George Malley (John Travolta))
- Platoon (1989 TV Asahi edition) (Gardner)
- Predator 2 (1994 TV Asahi edition) (Detective Danny Archuleta (Rubén Blades))
- Punch-Drunk Love (Lance (Luis Guzmán))
- Quiz Show (Dick Goodwin (Rob Morrow))
- Reign of Fire (Barlow (Ned Dennehy))
- Renegade (Bobby Sixkiller (Branscombe Richmond))
- Rising Sun (Bob Richmond (Kevin Anderson))
- RoboCop (2014) (Raymond Sellars (Michael Keaton))
- The Salvation (Sheriff Mallick (Douglas Henshall))
- Saw (Zep Hindle (Michael Emerson))
- Scarface (2004 DVD edition) (Omar (F. Murray Abraham))
- Screamers (2000 Fuji TV edition) (Private Michael 'Ace' Jefferson (Andrew Lauer))
- Seabiscuit (Tom Smith (Chris Cooper))
- A Series of Unfortunate Events (Ishmael (Peter MacNicol))
- Seven Golden Men (1982 TV Tokyo edition) (Aldo (Gabriele Tinti))
- Shallow Hal (Walt (Rene Kirby))
- The Silence of the Lambs (VHS edition) (Jame Gumb (Ted Levine))
- A Simple Plan (Jacob Mitchell (Billy Bob Thornton))
- Snake Eyes (Lou Logan (Kevin Dunn))
- Species III (Dr. Abbot (Robert Knepper))
- Star Trek Generations (Doctor Tolian Soran (Malcolm McDowell))
- Star Trek: The Next Generation (Lore (Brent Spiner))
- Star Trek V: The Final Frontier (Hikaru Sulu (George Takei))
- Street Kings (Captain James Biggs (Hugh Laurie))
- Spotlight (Walter "Robby" Robinson (Michael Keaton))
- The Stepford Wives (Roger Bannister (Roger Bart))
- The Sting (2009 DVD/Blu-Ray edition) (J.J. Singleton (Ray Walston))
- Super Mario Bros. (1994 NTV edition) (Iggy (Fisher Stevens))
- The Sweetest Thing (Roger Donahue (Jason Bateman))
- Teletubbies (Narrator)
- Their Finest (Ambrose Hilliard (Bill Nighy))
- Trading Places (Louis Winthorpe III (Dan Aykroyd))
- Tristan & Isolde (Lord Wictred (Mark Strong))
- Twister (Robert "Rabbit" Nurick (Alan Ruck))
- Under Siege 2: Dark Territory (1998 TV Asahi edition) (Travis Dane (Eric Bogosian))
- Unforgiven (W.W. Beauchamp (Saul Rubinek))
- The Uninvited (Steven Ivers (David Strathairn))
- The Untouchables (Oscar Wallace (Charles Martin Smith))
- Viper (Frankie "X" Waters)
- Wanted (2019 BS Japan edition) (The Exterminator (Konstantin Khabensky))
- Wasabi (Maurice (Michel Muller))
- Where the Crawdads Sing (Tom Milton (David Strathairn))
- Wild at Heart (Johnnie Farragut (Harry Dean Stanton))
- Witness (1990 TV Asahi edition) (Daniel Hochleitner (Alexander Godunov))
- The Young Pope (Don Tommaso Viglietti (Marcello Romolo))

==== Animation ====
- Alice in Wonderland (Buena Vista edition) (White Rabbit)
- Batman: The Animated Series (Mad Hatter (second voice), Lloyd Ventrix ("See No Evil"))
- A Bug's Life
- Dumbo (Timothy Q. Mouse)
- Finding Dory (Charlie)
- The Land Before Time X: The Great Longneck Migration (Bron)
- The Many Adventures of Winnie the Pooh (Pony Canyon edition) (Winnie the Pooh)
- Monsters, Inc. (Jeff Fungus)
- Peter Pan (Pony Canyon edition) (Mister Smee)
- Pinocchio (Pony Canyon edition) (Lampwick, Pleasure Island Carnival Bakers)
- Rango (Ambrose)
- Robin Hood (Bandai edition) (Sir Hiss, Church Mouse)
- Song of the South (Pony Canyon edition) (Br'er Bear)
- The Sword in the Stone (Kay)
