= Fayray discography =

- Studio albums: 7
- Singles: 22
- Video albums: 4
- Cover albums: 1

The discography of Japanese singer songwriter Fayray consists of eight studio albums (one of which is a cover album), twenty-two singles and four video albums.

== Discography ==
=== Studio albums ===
Year	Album details	Peak chart positions	Sales
1999	Craving: Released: 26 May 1999; Label: Antinos Records; Formats: CD, cassette	10	75,770
2000	Ever After: Released: 6 September 2000; Label: Antinos Records; Formats: CD, cassette	11	65,110
2001	Genuine: Released: 18 July 2001; Label: Antinos Records; Formats: CD, cassette	9	117,920
2003	Shiroi Hana: Released: 19 February 2003; Label: Avex Trax; Formats: CD, cassette	6	112,136
2004	Hourglass: Released: 27 October 2004; Label: R and C; Formats: CD, digital download	7	47,060
2005	Covers: Released: 8 June 2005; Label: R and C; Formats: CD, digital download	30	10,904
2006	Hikari to Kage: Released: 25 January 2006; Label: R and C; Formats: CD, digital download	40	8,674
2009	Nete mo Samete mo: Released: 14 January 2009; Label: R and C; Formats: CD, digital download	105	1,321

=== Singles ===
Release	Title	Oricon Singles Charts					Album
Release	Title	Peak Positions			Sales		Album
Release	Title	Daily	Weekly	Yearly	Debut	Overall	Album
1998	"Taiyō no Gravity"	—	12	—	17,430	150,500	Craving
1998	"Yura Yura (Vibration)"	—	28	—	12,420	35,880	Craving
1999	"Powder Veil"	—	30	—	9,130	16,300	Craving
1999	"Daydream Cafe"	—	41	—	—	10,360	Craving
1999	"Same Night, Same Face"	—	48	—	—	7,680	Craving
2000	"My Eyes"	—	66	—	—	3,060	Ever After
2000	"Tears"	—	11	99	15,760	259,510	Ever After
2001	"I'll Save You"	—	24	—	7,250	37,830	Genuine
2001	"Baby If,"	—	22	—	12,670	65,480	Genuine
2001	"Over"	—	18	—	9,150	27,030	Shiroi Hana
2002	"Remember"	—	52	—	—	7,430	Shiroi Hana
2002	"Stay"	—	24	—	7,340	14,420	Shiroi Hana
2002	"Touch Me, Kiss Me"	—	17	—	8,090	16,310	Shiroi Hana
2003	"Suki da Nante Ienai"	—	19	—	8,192	18,424	Shiroi Hana
2004	"Negai"	—	22	—	8,687	21,458	Hourglass
2004	"Look into My Eyes"	—	35	—	4,479	7,651	Hourglass
2004	"Aishite mo Aishitarinai"	—	46	—	6,108	10,975	Hourglass
2004	"Kuchizuke"	—	26	—	4,643	12,358	Hourglass
2005	"Spotlight"	—	81	—	1,498	1,934	Hikari to Kage
2006	"Hitori Yori Futari"	—	79	—	1,184	2,473	Nete mo Samete Mo
2006	"Hikari"	—	—	—	—	—	
2007	"Zero"	—	127	—	646	646	Nete mo Samete Mo
Top 20 songs		—	5	—			

== Video releases ==
=== Video/live albums ===
- 1999: Moving Fayray
- 2001: Fayray Clips 2000–2001
- 2003: Seraphic Fayray in New York + 5 Clips
- 2005: Fayray Live Tour 2004 Hourglass: Love at last

== Sales ==
=== Sales by year ===
Year	Sales
1998	186,380
1999	110,110
2000	327,680
2001	248,260
2002	38,160
2003	130,560
2004	99,502
2005	12,838
2006	11,147
2007	646
2008	—
2009	1,321
Total	1,166,604
