= Inoue =

- Language: Japanese

Origin
- Meaning: On the well
- Region of origin: Japan

Inoue (kanji: 井上, historical kana orthography: ゐのうへ Winouhe) is the 16th most common Japanese surname. Historically, it was also romanized as Inouye, and many Japanese-descended people outside of Japan still retain this spelling. A less common variant is 井之上.

== Notable people with the surname ==
- Akari Inoue
  - Akari Inoue (born 1988), Japanese competitor on the ITF Women's World Tennis Tour
  - Akari Inoue (born 1996), Japense bronze medallist at the 2019 Asian-Pacific Judo Championships
- Akio Inoue (井上 秋緒), Japanese lyricist
- Akira Inoue (film director) (井上 昭; 1928-2022), Japanese film director
- Akira Inoue (musician) (井上 鑑; born 1953), Japanese keyboardist, composer and producer
- Alice Inoue (born 1964), American astrologer and writer
- Arisa Inoue (井上 愛里沙; born 1995), Japanese volleyball player
- Asahi Inoue (井上 あさひ; born 1981), Japanese announcer
- Atsuo Inoue (井上 篤夫; born 1947), Japanese writer and translator
- Atsushi Inoue (井上 敦史; born 1977), Japanese footballer
- Azumi Inoue (井上 あずみ; born 1965), Japanese singer
- Daisuke Inoue (井上 大佑; born 1940), Japanese businessman and inventor
- Daisuke Inoue (井上大輔; (1941–2000)), Japanese singer, composer and multi-instrumentist
- Daisuke Inoue (rugby union) (井上 大介; born 1989), Japanese rugby union player
- Daniel Inouye (1924–2012), United States Senator for Hawaii and Medal of Honor recipient
- Egan Inoue (born 1965), American jiu-jitsu practitioner, mixed martial artist and racquetball player
- Enson Inoue (born 1967), American mixed martial artist
- Inoue Enryō (井上 円了; 1858–1919), Japanese founder of Toyo University, educator and philosopher
- Etsuko Inoue (井上 悦子; born 1964), Japanese tennis player
- Inoue Genzaburō (井上 源三郎; 1829–1868), Shinsengumi
- Haruka Inoue (井上 青香; born 1977), Japanese tennis player
- Harumi Inoue (井上 晴美; born 1974), Japanese actress and model
- Haruo Inoue (井上 春生; born 1963), Japanese film director
- Hideko Inouye (井上 秀子; 1875–1963), Japanese educator and first female president of Japan Women's University
- Hideto Inoue (井上 秀人; born 1982), Japanese footballer
- Inoue Hikaru (井上 光; 1851–1908), Japanese general
- Hina Inoue (born 2003), American tennis player
- Hiromitsu Inoue (born 1974), Japanese entomologist
- Hiroshi Inoue (bryologist) (井上 浩; 1932–1989), Japanese bryologist and subject of the standard botanical author abbreviation "Inoue"
- Hiroshi Inoue (entomologist) (井上 寬; born c. 1917), Japanese entomologist
- Hiroto Inoue (井上 大仁; born 1993), Japanese long-distance runner
- Hisashi Inoue (井上 ひさし; 1934–2010), Japanese writer and playwright
- Hisashi Inoue (historian) (井上 久士; born 1950), Japanese historian
- Honoka Inoue (井上 ほの花; born 1998), Japanese voice actress and singer
- Jo Inoue (井上 丈; born 1994), Japanese footballer
- Joe Inoue (井上 ジョー; born 1985), American musician
- Jun Inoue (井上 順; born 1947), Japanese television personality, singer, actor and comedian
- Junichi Inoue (井上 純一; born 1971), Japanese speed skater
- Junnosuke Inoue (井上 準之助; 1869–1932), Japanese businessman and banker
- Junya Inoue (井上 淳哉; born 1971), Japanese manga artist
- Kaori Inoue (井上 香織; born 1982), Japanese volleyball player
- Inoue Kaoru (井上 馨; 1836–1915), Japanese politician
- Katsunosuke Inoue (井上 勝之助; 1861–1929), Japanese diplomat
- Kazuhiko Inoue (井上 和彦; born 1954), Japanese voice actor and singer
- Kazuhiro Inoue (born 1973), Japanese mixed martial artist
- Kazuki Inoue (井上 一樹; born 1971), Japanese baseball player
- Kazuma Inoue (井上 和馬; born 1990), Japanese footballer
- Kazuo Inoue (井上 和郎; born 1981), Japanese cyclist
- Kazurou Inoue (井上 和郎; born 1972), Japanese manga artist
- Keita Inoue (井上 慶太; born 1964), Japanese shogi player
- Kenji Inoue (井上 謙二; born 1976), Japanese sport wrestler
- Inoue Kenkabō (井上 剣花坊; 1870–1934), Japanese journalist and writer
- Kiichi Inoue (井上 喜一; 1932–2010), Japanese politician
- Kikuko Inoue (井上 喜久子; born 1964), Japanese singer and voice actress
- Kiyonobu Inoue (井上 清信; born 1970), better known as Inoran, Japanese musician
- Kiyoshi Inoue (井上 清; 1913–2001), Japanese academic, historian and writer
- Kiyoto Inoue (井上 清登; born 1957), Japanese sprint canoeist
- Kohei Inoue (井上 公平; born 1978), Japanese footballer
- Koki Inoue (井上浩樹; born 1992), Japanese boxer
- Kōsei Inoue (井上 康生; born 1978), Japanese judoka
- Kotoe Inoue (井上 琴絵; born 1990), Japanese volleyball player
- Kouichi Inoue (井上 幸一; born 1946), Japanese golfer
- Inoue Kowashi (井上 毅; 1844–1895), Japanese statesman
- Kozo Inoue (井上 公造; born 1956), Japanese journalist
- Kyoichi Inoue (井上 強一; born 1935), Japanese aikidoka
- Kyoko Inoue (井上 京子; born 1969), Japanese professional wrestler
- Lorraine Inouye (born 1940), American politician serving in the Hawaii State Senate
- Lurdes Inoue, Brazilian statistician
- Maiko Inoue (井上 摩衣子; born 1979), Japanese tennis player
- Makio Inoue (井上 真樹夫; 1938–2019), Japanese voice actor
- Makoto Inoue (井上 信; born 1974), Japanese golfer
- Mao Inoue (井上 真央; born 1987), Japanese actress
- Marina Inoue (井上 麻里奈; born 1985), Japanese voice actress and singer
- Inoue Masaharu (井上 正春; 1805–1847), Japanese daimyō
- Masahiro Inoue (井上 正大; born 1989), Japanese actor and martial artist
- Masaki Inoue (井上 昌己; born 1979), Japanese cyclist
- Masakichi Inoue (井上 政吉; 1886–1975), Japanese general
- Inoue Masamoto (井上 正甫; 1778–1858), Japanese daimyō
- Inoue Masanao (井上 正直; 1837–1904), Japanese daimyō
- Mao Inoue (井上 麻生; born 1997), Japanese professional wrestler known by his ring name Mao
- Masanori Inoue (井上 将憲; born 1972), Japanese hurdler and bobsledder
- Masao Inoue (actor) (井上 正夫; 1881–1950), Japanese actor and film director
- Masao Inoue (wrestler) (井上 雅央; born 1970), Japanese professional wrestler
- Inoue Masaoto (井上 正巳; 1856–1921), Japanese daimyō
- Inoue Masaru (bureaucrat) (井上 勝; 1843–1910), Japanese government official
- Inoue Masasada (井上 正定; 1754–1786), Japanese daimyō
- Inoue Masashige (井上 政重; 1585–1661), Japanese daimyō
- Inoue Masatsune (井上 正経; 1725–1766), Japanese daimyō
- Megumi Inoue (井上 恵; born 1973), Japanese sport shooter
- Miki Inoue (井上 美紀; born 1967), Japanese voice actress
- Minako Inoue (井上 美奈子; born 1977), Japanese singer
- Mitsuharu Inoue (井上光晴; 1926–1992), Japanese writer
- Miyabi Inoue (井上 雅; born 1991), Japanese tennis player
- Miyako Inoue (anthropologist) (born 1962), American anthropologist
- Mizuki Inoue (井上 瑞樹; born 1994), Japanese kickboxer and mixed martial artist
- Motokatsu Inoue (1918–1993), Japanese martial artist
- Nagi Inoue (井上和; born 2005), Japanese idol singer Nogizaka46 member
- Nanami Inoue (井上 奈々朱; born 1989), Japanese volleyball player
- Naohisa Inoue (井上 直久; born 1948), Japanese painter
- Naoki Inoue (井上 直樹; born 1997), Japanese mixed martial artist
- Naoya Inoue (井上 尚弥; born 1993), Japanese boxer
- Nisshō Inoue (井上 日召; 1887–1967), Japanese Buddhist preacher and far-right activist
- Nobuyuki Inoue (井上 信行), Japanese video game developer
- Noriaki Inoue (井上 鑑昭; 1902–1994), Japanese aikidoka
- Norihiro Inoue (井上 倫宏; born 1958), Japanese actor and voice actor
- Osamu Inoue (井上 治; born 1932), Japanese long-distance runner
- Rena Inoue (井上 怜奈; born 1976), Japanese-born American figure skater
- Rikito Inoue (井上 黎生人; born 1997), Japanese footballer
- Ryoki Inoue (born 1946), Brazilian writer
- Ryota Inoue (井上 亮太; born 1990), Japanese footballer
- Ryota Inoue (井上 涼太; born 1988), better known as Kazunoko, Japanese fighting games player
- Sadae Inoue (井上 貞衛; 1886–1961), Japanese general
- Sanji Inoue (井上 三次; born 1948), Japanese cyclist
- Santa Inoue (井上 三太; born 1968), Japanese manga artist
- Satoko Inoue (井上 郷子; born 1958), Japanese pianist
- Satoru Inoue (井上 悟; born 1971), Japanese sprinter
- Satoshi Inoue (musician) (井上 智; born 1959), Japanese jazz guitarist
- Satoshi Inoue (politician) (井上 哲士; born 1958), Japanese politician
- Seiryū Inoue (井上 青龍; 1931–1988), Japanese photographer
- Seiya Inoue (baseball) (井上 晴哉; born 1989), Japanese baseball player
- Setsuko Inoue (井上 節子; born 1946), Japanese volleyball player
- Shigeyoshi Inoue (井上 成美; 1889–1975), Imperial Japanese Navy admiral
- Shingo Inoue (井上 真悟; born 1980), Japanese marathon runner
- Shinji Inoue (井上 信治; born 1969), Japanese politician
- Shinya Inoué (井上 信也; 1921–2019), Japanese-born American biophysicist and cell biologist
- Shion Inoue (井上 潮音; born 1997), Japanese footballer
- Shoko Inoue (井上 昌己; born 1969), Japanese singer
- Shota Inoue (井上 翔太; born 1989), Japanese footballer
- Shumpei Inoue (井上 俊平), Japanese footballer
- Shunsuke Inoue (井上 俊輔; born 1985), Japanese volleyball player
- Sonoko Inoue (井上 苑子; born 1997), Japanese singer-songwriter and actress
- Sueo Inoue (井上 末雄; born 1949), Japanese professional wrestler known by his ring name Mighty Inoue
- Tadayuki Inoue (井上 忠行; 1935–2007), Japanese baseball player
- Taira Inoue (井上 平; born 1983), Japanese footballer
- Takako Inoue (井上 貴子; born 1969), Japanese professional wrestler
- Takashi Inoue (井之上 隆志; 1960–2017), Japanese actor
- Takashi Inoue (author) (井之上 喬; born 1944), Japanese public relations practitioner, scholar and theorist
- Takehiko Inoue (井上 雄彦; born 1967), Japanese manga artist
- Takeshi Inoue (footballer) (井上 健; 1928 – 1992), Japanese footballer
- Takeshi Inoue (mixed martial artist) (井上 武; born 1980), Japanese mixed martial artist
- Taki Inoue (born 1963), Japanese racing driver
- Taku Inoue (井上 拓; born 1983), Japanese composer
- Takuma Inoue (井上 拓真; born 1995), Japanese boxer
- Takuto Inoue (井上 拓斗; born 1995), Japanese badminton player
- Tetsu Inoue, American music producer
- Tetsuo Inoue (井上 哲夫), Japanese table tennis player
- Inoue Tetsujirō (井上 哲次郎; 1855–1944), Japanese philosopher
- Tomohiro Inoue (井上 智裕; born 1987), Japanese sport wrestler
- Toshiaki Inoue (井上 敏明; born 1951), Japanese triple jumper
- Toshiki Inoue (井上 敏樹; born 1959), Japanese screenwriter
- Umetsugu Inoue (井上 梅次; 1923–2010), Japanese film director and screenwriter
- Waka Inoue (井上 和香; born 1980), Japanese idol, television personality and actress
- Wataru Inoue (井上 亘; born 1973), Japanese professional wrestler
- Wataru Inoue (footballer) (井上 渉; born 1986), Japanese footballer
- Wayne Inouye (born 1953), American businessman
- Yasushi Inoue (井上 靖; 1907–1991), Japanese poet and writer
- Yō Inoue (井上 瑤; 1946–2003), Japanese voice actress
- Yoshihiro Inoue (井上 嘉浩; 1969–2018), a high-ranking member of Aum Shinrikyo executed for the Tokyo subway attack
- Yoshihisa Inoue (井上 義久; born 1947), Japanese politician
- Inoue Yoshika (井上 良馨; 1845–1929), Imperial Japanese Navy officer
- Yoshiko Inoue (井上 佳子; born 1988), Japanese sport wrestler
- Yōsui Inoue (井上 陽水; born 1948), Japanese singer-songwriter
- Yudai Inoue (井上 裕大; born 1989), Japanese footballer
- Yuki Inoue (footballer) (井上 雄幾; born 1977), Japanese footballer
- Yuko Inoue (井上 祐子), Japanese classical violinist
- Yuzuru Inoue (井上 謙; born 1963), Japanese volleyball player
- Yuki Inoue (curler) (井上 祐樹), Japanese curler

== Fictional characters ==
- Chisato Inoue (井上 千里), a character in the anime series Vampire Princess Miyu
- Takina Inoue (井ノ上 たきな), a character in the anime series Lycoris Recoil
- Kanbei Inoue (井上 勘兵衛), a character in the film Azumi
- Mayuko Inoue (井上 真由子), a character in the manga series Ushio and Tora
- Orihime (井上 織姫) and Sora Inoue (井上 昊), characters in the manga series Bleach
- Toro Inoue (井上 トロ), an anthropomorphized cat created by Sony Interactive Entertainment
- Yolei Inoue or Miyako Inoue (井ノ上 京), a character in the anime series Digimon Adventure 02
