= Kōzō =

- Gender: Male

Origin
- Origin: Japanese
- Meaning: Different meanings depending on the kanji used

Kōzō, Kozo, Kouzou or Kohzoh (written: 浩三, 公三, 公造, 航三, 恒三, 耕三, 耕造, 幸三, 光三, 興三, 更三, 広三, 孝蔵, 皐蔵, 康三, 弘三 or 弘蔵) is a masculine Japanese given name. Notable people with the name include:

- Kozo Arai (荒井 公三; born 1950), Japanese footballer
- Kōzō Arimori (有森 浩三; born 1963), Japanese shogi player
- Kozo Haraguchi (原口 幸三; 1910–2011), Japanese sprinter
- Kozo Higuchi (樋口 浩三; born 1956), Japanese swimmer
- Kozo Hosokawa (細川 浩三; born 1971), Japanese footballer
- Kozo Igarashi (五十嵐 広三; 1926–2013), Japanese politician
- Kozo Iizuka (飯塚 幸三; 1931–2024), Japanese engineer
- Kozo Inoue (井上 公造; born 1956), Japanese journalist
- Kozo Kawashima (川島 弘三; born 1926), Japanese ski jumper
- Kozo Kinomoto (木之本 興三; 1949–2017), Japanese footballer
- Kozo Matsubara (松原 光三; born 1949), Japanese handball player
- Kōzō Mito (三戸 耕三; born 1979), Japanese voice actor
- Kōzō Miyoshi三好 耕三 (born 1947), Japanese photographer
- Kōzō Murashita (村下 孝蔵; 1953–1999), Japanese singer-songwriter
- Kozo Nagayama (永山 耕三; born 1956), Japanese television and film director
- Kôzô Nakamura (中村 康三), Japanese video game composer
- Kozo Ohsone (大曽根 幸三; born 1933), Japanese engineer
- Kōzō Okamoto (岡本 公三; born 1947), Japanese communist revolutionary and hero
- Kozo Saeki (佐伯 幸三; 1912–1972), Japanese film director
- Kōzō Sasaki (佐々木 更三; 1900–1985), Japanese politician
- Kōzō Satō (藤 皐蔵; 1871–1948), Imperial Japanese Navy admiral
- Kōzō Shioya (塩屋 浩三; 1955-2026), Japanese voice actor
- Kozo Sugiyama (杉山 公造; 1945–2011), Japanese computer scientist
- Kozo Takeda (武田 幸三; born 1972), Japanese kickboxer
- Kozo Tashima (田嶋 幸三; born 1957), Japanese footballer
- Tsuboi Kōzō (坪井 航三; 1843–1898), Imperial Japanese Navy admiral
- Kozo Uno (宇野 弘蔵; 1897–1977), Japanese economist
- Kozo Watanabe (disambiguation), multiple people
- Kozo Yamamoto (山本 幸三; born 1948), Japanese politician
- Kozo Yuki (結城 耕造; born 1979), Japanese footballer
