= Hideto =

- Gender: Male

Origin
- Origin: Japanese
- Meaning: Different meanings depending on the kanji used

Hideto (written: 秀人, 栄斗) is a masculine Japanese given name. Notable people with the name include:

- Hideto Aki (秋 秀人; born 1970), Japanese film director
- Hideto Asamura (浅村 栄斗; born 1990), Japanese professional baseball player
- Hideto Horiike (堀池 秀人; born 1949), Japanese architect
- Hideto Inoue (井上 秀人; born 1982), Japanese footballer
- Hideto Matsumoto (松本 秀人; 1964–1998), Japanese musician
- Hideto Shigenobu (born 1954), Japanese golfer
- Hideto Suzuki (鈴木 秀人; born 1974), Japanese footballer
- Hideto Takahashi (高橋 秀人; born 1987), Japanese footballer
- Hideto Takarai (寶井 秀人; born 1969), Japanese musician
- Hideto Tanihara (谷原 秀人; born 1978), Japanese golfer
