= List of Cyborg 009: The Cyborg Soldier episodes =

Cyborg 009: The Cyborg Soldier is a Japanese anime series based on the manga of the same name written by Shotaro Ishinomori. The series aired on TV Tokyo in Japan from October 14, 2001, to October 13, 2002. The anime was dubbed by Animaze, Inc. and ZRO Limit Productions, and was shortened to its manga name. It aired on Cartoon Network's Toonami from June 30, 2003, to September 26, 2003, with the first 26 episodes before moving to Saturday mornings to air episodes 27 to 42.

The opening theme is "What's the Justice?" by Globe. The first ending theme is "Genesis of Next" by Globe, the second ending theme is "Starting from Here" by Globe and the third ending theme is "I Do" by Fayray.

== Episode list ==
No.	Title	Original release date
1	"The Birth"; Transliteration: "Tanjō" (Japanese: 誕生)	October 14, 2001
When an ordinary boy wakes up in a mysterious laboratory, he discovers he has incredible powers & escapes to find others like him.
2	"The Escape"; Transliteration: "Dasshutsu" (Japanese: 脱出)	October 21, 2001
The 9 rebel Cyborgs return to their base to destroy their evil creator—Black Ghost.
3	"The Assassin of Flash"; Transliteration: "Senkō no Ansatsusha" (Japanese: 閃光の暗殺者)	October 28, 2001
The team meets Cyborg 0010—but he is no friend. Instead, this incredibly powerful foe is programmed to eliminate the band of rebels.
4	"At the End of the Battle"; Transliteration: "Shitō no Hate ni" (Japanese: 死闘の果てに)	November 4, 2001
When Cyborg 0010 turns out to be twice the opponent they expected, the cyborgs' only hope is to combine powers before he defeats them.
5	"Tears of Steel"; Transliteration: "Kōtetsu no Namida" (Japanese: 鋼鉄の涙)	November 11, 2001
When Black Ghost sends Cyborg 0011 to terminate the rebels, he's got powers & a presence beyond imagination.
6	"Search for the Professor!"; Transliteration: "Kieta Hakase wo Oe!" (Japanese: 消えた博士を追え！)	November 18, 2001
In the search for kidnapped Professor Kozumi, the cyborgs find a beautiful woman in a magnificent mansion. But neither is quite what they seem.
7	"Defeat the Invisible Opponent"; Transliteration: "Mienai Teki wo Ute" (Japanese: 見えない敵を撃て)	November 25, 2001
The hunt continues for Professor Kozumi in Tokyo, 009's hometown, where painful & puzzling memories from his past deepen the mystery.
8	"Friend"; Transliteration: "Tomodachi" (Japanese: トモダチ)	December 2, 2001
Using his unseen power, Cyborg 0013 devastates Tokyo with catastrophic force, & 009 finds a hero in the most unlikely place.
9	"Devil of the Deep Sea"; Transliteration: "Shinkai no Akuma" (Japanese: 深海の悪魔)	December 9, 2001
After 0013 & his invisible robot are destroyed, the race is on between the rebels & Black Ghost to recover the robot's computer brain.
10	"Operation Auroras"; Transliteration: "Ōrora Sakusen" (Japanese: オーロラ作戦)	December 16, 2001
When Cyborg 007 brings down an enemy transport, they discover Black Ghost's latest secret.
11	"Christmas Eve Mirage"; Transliteration: "Genei no Ibu" (Japanese: 幻影の聖夜)	December 23, 2001
While in Paris for Christmas, Cyborg 003 is injected with a drug that sends her into a dream world where past & present collide.
12	"Mystical Island"; Transliteration: "Nazo no Mujintō" (Japanese: なぞの無人島)	January 6, 2002
When Cyborgs 005, 006 & 007 crash land on a deserted island, they stumble upon a loyal new friend determined to save their lives.
13	"London Fogs"; Transliteration: "Rondon no Kiri" (Japanese: 倫敦の霧)	January 13, 2002
Memories of 007's former life as an actor resurface when he sees his ex-girlfriend's daughter Rosa in a production of their old play. But when Black Ghost attacks, 007 will have to make sure that the show goes on as planned.
14	"The Land of Reunions"; Transliteration: "Saikai no Chi de" (Japanese: 再会の地で)	January 20, 2002
Cyborgs 002 & 009 join 008 in his homeland of Mwanba in a fight to overthrow Unbaba, the dictatorial President.
15	"Goodbye My Friend"; Transliteration: "Saraba Tomo yo" (Japanese: さらば友よ)	January 27, 2002
As the fighting in Mwanba continues, 008 discovers his old friend Mamado has been turned into a Black Ghost cyborg warrior.
16	"Breaking In"; Transliteration: "Totsunyū" (Japanese: 突入)	February 3, 2002
Black Ghost orders Fuerge to capture the 00 cyborgs to study the source of their incredible powers.
17	"The Final Battle"; Transliteration: "Kessen" (Japanese: 決戦)	February 10, 2002
Tricking Fuerge into thinking his magnatron weapon has left them powerless, the cyborgs allow themselves to be taken aboard the Black Ghost's base & destroy it from within.
18	"The Story of a Struggling Restaurant"; Transliteration: "Chan Chanku Hanten Funtōki" (Japanese: 張々湖飯店奮闘記)	February 17, 2002
Having finally defeated Black Ghost, 006 cooks up a scheme to woo a food critic at the grand opening of his new Tokyo restaurant.
19	"The Hero's Conditions"; Transliteration: "Hīrō no Jōken" (Japanese: 英雄の条件)	February 24, 2002
On a visit to his hometown of New York, 002 proves he's the hero he claims to be when he uses his powers to save a young boy's mother.
20	"A Phantom Dog"; Transliteration: "Maboroshi no Inu" (Japanese: まぼろしの犬)	March 3, 2002
When a series of mysterious & deadly fires ignite throughout Tokyo, suspicions rise that 009's dog Kubikuro may be to blame.
21	"The Fossils of Evil"; Transliteration: "Aku no Kaseki" (Japanese: 悪の化石)	March 10, 2002
The cyborgs get more than they bargain for on an expedition to capture a dinosaur, when they discover the prehistoric monsters are actually robots.
22	"Attack of the Gods (Mythos Arc)"; Transliteration: "Kamigami no Raishū (Myūtosu Hen)" (Japanese: 神々の来襲（ミュートス編）)	March 17, 2002
When terrible earthquakes & storms threaten mankind, Gilmore & the cyborgs discover just how angry the gods can get.
23	"Mythology Arises (Mythos Arc)"; Transliteration: "Sobietatsu Shinwa (Myūtosu Hen)" (Japanese: そびえたつ神話（ミュートス編）)	March 24, 2002
The Greek gods continue their battle with the cyborgs as 009's showdown with Apollo rages on.
24	"Artemis (Mythos Arc)"; Transliteration: "Arutemisu (Myūtosu Hen)" (Japanese: アルテミス（ミュートス編）)	March 31, 2002
As the war between the cyborgs & the gods continues, 007's reconnaissance mission reveals the truth about their belligerent enemies, while Artemis risks the wrath of Apollo to save 009's life.
25	"Mythos, The Final Chapter (Mythos Arc)"; Transliteration: "Myūtosu, Shūshō (Myūtosu Hen)" (Japanese: ミュートス、終章（ミュートス編）)	April 7, 2002
The battle between the gods & cyborgs come to a violent end when Apollo turns on Gaya & makes the ultimate sacrifice.
26	"Gilmore's Notes"; Transliteration: "Girumoa Nōto" (Japanese: ギルモアノート)	April 21, 2002
A recap episode that follows the notes Gilmore's writing on each 00 cyborg about their pasts & personalities.
27	"Little Visitors"; Transliteration: "Chīsana Raihōsha" (Japanese: 小さな来訪者)	April 28, 2002
3 alien children arrive on earth to save themselves from the invaders that are destroying their race. The 00 cyborgs will help them.
28	"The Fight for Tomorrow"; Transliteration: "Tatakai no Ashita" (Japanese: 闘いの未来)	May 5, 2002
The fight to save the alien children goes on while 002 encourages them to use their psychic powers & fight for themselves.
29	"The Blue Earth"; Transliteration: "Aoi Kemono" (Japanese: 青いけもの)	May 12, 2002
A powerful blue beast is attacking construction sites & factories, causing death & destruction. 005 sets out to stop its rampage.
30	"Computopia"; Transliteration: "Conpyūtopia" (Japanese: 未来都市)	May 19, 2002
The 00 Cyborgs visit Computopia, a futuristic city run by a super computer named Sphinx. The machine falls in love with 003 & tries to eliminate whoever it perceives as an obstacle to their love.
31	"Monster Island"; Transliteration: "Monsutā Airando" (Japanese: 怪物島)	May 26, 2002
An unconscious hiker leads 006 & 007 to a mysterious island where massive monsters roam the land.
32	"Man or Machine"; Transliteration: "Kiki Kaikai" (Japanese: 機々械々)	June 2, 2002
004 is sent to investigate strange activities in an abandoned castle. There he'll have to battle a replica of himself.
33	"Frozen Time"; Transliteration: "Kesshō Jikan" (Japanese: 結晶時間)	June 9, 2002
009 undergoes regular maintenance when something goes haywire with his acceleration switch.
34	"The Pharaoh's Curse"; Transliteration: "Farao Wirusu" (Japanese: ファラオウィルス)	June 16, 2002
Gilmore, 003 & 009 visit Egypt to meet Gilmore's old friend Herschl, when the scientists, including Herschl exploring Tutankhamen's tomb fell ill. They wonder if the Pharaoh's curse really is true.
35	"The City of Wind"; Transliteration: "Kaze no To" (Japanese: 風の都)	June 23, 2002
009 & the gang travel to South America in search for Sir Van Allen, 007's old friend only to find out he was in the brink of dying. Could it be related to the strong wind that reveals a golden pyramid & a singing maiden named Ixquic?
36	"The Frozen Land"; Transliteration: "Kōru Daichi" (Japanese: 凍る大地)	June 30, 2002
A mysterious giant cobra stirs in the frozen mountains of Japan when the country suffers bizarre weather conditions.
37	"The Night of the Star Festival"; Transliteration: "Hoshimatsuri no Yoru" (Japanese: 星祭の夜)	July 7, 2002
009 goes soul-searching & meets a girl named 'Alice', who can jump time & takes him to the person he wishes to see the most.
38	"Black Ghost"; Transliteration: "Burakku Gōsuto" (Japanese: 黒い幽霊団)	July 14, 2002
We see the birth of the cyborg project & Gilmore's involvement in the operations that created all the 00 series.
39	"The New Assassins (Mutant Warriors Arc)"; Transliteration: "Aratanaru Shikaku (Myūtanto Senshi Hen)" (Japanese: 新たなる刺客（ミュータント戦士編）)	July 21, 2002
The 00 cyborgs are attacked by 4 new cyborgs who all possess psychic powers similar to 001.
40	"Synchro Warp: Tuning Leap (Mutant Warriors Arc)"; Transliteration: "Shinkuro Wāpu: Dōchō Chōyaku (Myūtanto Senshi Hen)" (Japanese: シンクロワープ ―同調跳躍―（ミュータント戦士編）)	July 28, 2002
The 4 psychic cyborgs are revealed to be acting under Gamo's order. The scientist, who is 001's biological father & creator, wishes to prove the value of his research to Black Ghost by destroying the 00 series.
41	"Future Fury (Mutant Warriors Arc)"; Transliteration: "Akumu no Mirai (Myūtanto Senshi Hen)" (Japanese: 悪夢の未来（ミュータント戦士編）)	August 4, 2002
A mishap occurs during a fight resulting in 009 & 1 of the psychic cyborgs being transported to the future.
42	"To Tomorrow... (Mutant Warriors Arc)"; Transliteration: "Ashita e... (Myūtanto Senshi Hen)" (Japanese: 明日へ…（ミュータント戦士編）)	August 11, 2002
The 00 team work to save 009 by teleporting themselves forward in time, where they face the final battle with the rogue psychic cyborg Cain.
43	"Old Friends (Underground Empire "Yomi" Arc)"; Transliteration: "Ihen (Chika Teikoku "Yomi" Hen)" (Japanese: 異変（地下帝国「ヨミ」編）)	August 18, 2002
Enormous pterodactyls emitting subsonar waves begin to destroy human settlements all over the world. 009 finds his old friends from the orphanage mysteriously alive and well, but are they really what they seem?
44	"Von Vogt (Underground Empire "Yomi" Arc)"; Transliteration: "Ban Bogūto (Chika Teikoku "Yomi" Hen)" (Japanese: バン·ボグート（地下帝国「ヨミ」編）)	August 25, 2002
009 rescues an amnesiac woman from the ruins of his old friend's house, but what secret does she hold- and how is she connected to Von Vogt, the CEO of a powerful subsonar-weapons manufacturing company?
45	"Goodbye, Dolphin (Underground Empire "Yomi" Arc)"; Transliteration: "Sayonara, Dorufin (Chika Teikoku "Yomi" Hen)" (Japanese: さよなら、ドルフィン（地下帝国「ヨミ」編）)	September 1, 2002
The cyborgs sacrifice more than they could have imagined when they go underground to pursue the claims of the amnesiac woman & her mysterious sister.
46	"Go Underground! (Underground Empire "Yomi" Arc)"; Transliteration: "Chitei e! (Chika Teikoku "Yomi" Hen)" (Japanese: 地底へ！（地下帝国「ヨミ」編）)	September 8, 2002
Having been split up by various disasters, the team struggles to defeat Black Ghost. 004 bonds with the mysterious sister.
47	"Rise of the Demon (Underground Empire "Yomi" Arc)"; Transliteration: "Majin, Hatsudō (Chika Teikoku "Yomi" Hen)" (Japanese: 魔神、発動（地下帝国「ヨミ」編）)	September 15, 2002
As Yomi crumbles, 004 faces his largest test yet against a bloodstained Von Vogt. When all hope seems lost, 009 seems to be the only thing standing against Black Ghost's resurrection...
Recap	"Yomi Group (Underground Empire "Yomi" Arc)"; Transliteration: "Yomi no Gunzō (Chika Teikoku "Yomi" Hen)" (Japanese: 黄泉の群像（地下帝国「ヨミ」編）)	September 22, 2002
Second recap.
48	"From Here to Eternity (Underground Empire "Yomi" Arc)"; Transliteration: "Koko Yori Towa ni (Chika Teikoku "Yomi" Hen)" (Japanese: 地上より永遠に（地下帝国「ヨミ」編）)	September 29, 2002
Black Ghost threatens the world with his deadliest weapon yet. It's up to 009 to finish the fight, once & for all- even if it comes at the price of him & his best friend's life.
49	"The Goddess Scheme"; Transliteration: "Megami no Hakarigoto" (Japanese: 女神の陰謀)	October 6, 2002
A special arc not connected to the previous 48 episodes, and loosely based on Shotaro Ishinomori's unfinished final chapter "Conclusion: God's War". In this 1st episode, Shotaro Ishinomori finds himself contacted by Dr. Gilmore, who he believed to only be a fictional character, & learns that his manga "Cyborg 009" was actually based on mental suggestions broadcast by 001, & that the end of the world is approaching. With the 00 Cyborg team having disbanded in the years since their battles, 009 visits a well-respected scientist & his priestess daughter Hisui as they excavate an ominous Moai from the ruins of an island.
50	"The Humming Light"; Transliteration: "Hikari no Haneoto" (Japanese: 光の羽音)	October 13, 2002
Possessed by the Moai statue & declaring herself to be "Queen Himiko", Hisui begins to brainwash the population of Japan into worshipping her. While split up & out investigating the strange events plaguing the world, the entire 00 Cyborg team find themselves succumbing to overwhelming feelings of anger & temptation after an angel appears & shows them the darkness within their hearts.
51	"The Birth of the Universe"; Transliteration: "Uchū no Ubugoe" (Japanese: 宇宙の産声)	Unaired
A DVD-exclusive episode, though parts of it were spliced with "The Humming Light" for the former's TV broadcast. In this 3rd & final part, the 00 Cyborgs do battle against oni but are beaten severely, necessitating 001 to provide power-ups for them & to unlock their hidden esper abilities. As Queen Himiko threatens to restart humanity, the 00 Cyborgs decide to challenge her for the fate of the Earth.
