= Kuchizuke =

Single by Fayray

from the album HOURGLASS
- Released: October 13, 2004
- Genre: J-Pop
- Length: 13:24
- Label: R&C Japan
- Songwriter(s): Fayray
- Producer(s): Fayray

Fayray singles chronology
"Aishite mo Aishitarinai" (2004)	"Kuchizuke" (2004)	"Spotlight" (2005)

"Kuchizuke" (口づけ) is Fayray's 18th single. It was released on October 13, 2004 and peaked at #26. The song was used as theme song for the Tōkai TV/Fuji TV series Soap opera "Ai no Solea". The first coupling is a cover of Fleetwood Mac's "Landslide".

== Track listing ==
1. 口づけ (Kuchizuke; Kiss)
2. Landslide
3. Someday
4. Someday (Jazz version)

== Charts ==
"Kuchizuke" - Oricon Sales Chart (Japan)

Release	Chart	Peak Position	Sales Total	Chart Run
October 13, 2004	Oricon Daily Singles Chart			
October 13, 2004	Oricon Weekly Singles Chart	#26	12,358	6 weeks
October 13, 2004	Oricon Yearly Singles Chart			
