= Over (Fayray song) =

Single by Fayray

from the album Shiroi Hana
- Released: October 11, 2001
- Genre: J-Pop
- Length: 7:30
- Label: avex trax
- Songwriter(s): Fayray
- Producer(s): Fayray

Fayray singles chronology
"Baby if," (2001)	"Over" (2001)	"Remember" (2002)

"Over" is Fayray's 10th single and first on new record label, avex trax. It was released on October 11, 2001 and peaked at #18. The song was used in a commercial for Kanebo's "KATE spicy eyes" cosmetics line and also served as ending theme for the TV Tokyo program "Lon-Mu London Ongakukan". The coupling is a cover of Divinyls's "I Touch Myself".

== Track listing ==
1. Over
2. I Touch Myself

== Charts ==
"Over" - Oricon Sales Chart (Japan)

Release	Chart	Peak Position	Sales Total	Chart Run
October 11, 2001	Oricon Daily Singles Chart			
October 11, 2001	Oricon Weekly Singles Chart	18	27,030	5 weeks
October 11, 2001	Oricon Yearly Singles Chart			
