= Horiike =

Horiike (written: 堀池) is a Japanese surname. Notable people with the surname include:

- Hideto Horiike (堀池 秀人, born 1949), Japanese architect
- Hiromitsu Horiike (堀池 洋充, born 1971), Japanese footballer
- Takumi Horiike (堀池 巧, born 1965), Japanese footballer
