= Portable stereo =

Portable stereo may refer to:

- personal stereo, such as the Sony Walkman
- boombox, sometimes called a "ghetto blaster"
