= Powder Veil =

Single by Fayray

from the album Craving
- Released: February 10, 1999
- Genre: J-Pop
- Length: 18:32
- Label: Antinos Records
- Songwriter(s): Akio Inoue, Daisuke Asakura

Fayray singles chronology
"Yura・Yura～Vibration" (1998)	"Powder Veil" (1999)	"Daydream Cafe" (1999)

"Powder Veil" is Fayray's 3rd single. It was released on February 10, 1999, and peaked at #30. The song was used as the ending theme for the Nippon TV program "Guruguru Ninety Nine".

== Track listing ==
1. Powder Veil
2. Powder Veil (Songria mix)
3. Powder Veil (Original Backing Track)
4. Powder Veil (Ayumi Obinata mix)

== Charts ==
"Powder Veil" - Oricon Sales Chart (Japan)

Release	Chart	Peak Position	Sales Total	Chart Run
February 10, 1999	Oricon Daily Singles Chart			
February 10, 1999	Oricon Weekly Singles Chart	30	16,300	3 weeks
February 10, 1999	Oricon Yearly Singles Chart			
