= Inoue (disambiguation) =

Inoue is a Japanese surname.

Inoue may also refer to:

- Inoue, forerunner to Icom Incorporated, international manufacturer of radio transmitting and receiving equipment
- Inoue grappling, a form of mixed martial arts developed by Egan Inoue
- Inoue house, one of the go schools of the Edo period
- Inoue Rubber Co., Ltd. Japanese maker of tires
- 6637 Inoue, a main-belt asteroid
