= Atsuo =

- Gender: Male

Origin
- Origin: Japanese
- Meaning: Different meanings depending on the kanji used

Atsuo (written: 敦夫, 篤夫, 篤緒, 淳夫 or 篤男) is a masculine Japanese given name. Notable people with the name include:

- Atsuo Asami (浅見 敦夫), Japanese astronomer
- Atsuo Inoue (井上 篤夫; born 1947), Japanese writer and translator
- Atsuo Irie (入江 淳夫; born 1937), Japanese ice hockey player
- Atsuo Kudo (工藤 篤緒; born 1965), Japanese ice hockey player
- Masamune Atsuo (正宗 敦夫; 1881–1958), Japanese literature researcher and poet
- Atsuo Nakamura (中村 敦夫; born 1940), Japanese actor and politician
- Atsuo Sawada (澤田 篤男; born 1964), Japanese professional wrestler
- Atsuo Watanabe (渡辺 敦夫; born 1974), Japanese footballer
- The drummer of the Japanese avant-garde metal band Boris
