= Daydream Café =

Single by Fayray

from the album CRAVING
- Released: May 12, 1999
- Genre: J-Pop
- Length: 13:51
- Label: Antinos Records
- Songwriter(s): Akio Inoue, Daisuke Asakura

Fayray singles chronology
"Powder Veil" (1999)	"Daydream Café" (1999)	"Same night, same face" (1999)

"Daydream Café" is Fayray's 4th single. It was released on May 12, 1999 and peaked at #41. The song was used as the ending theme for the ABC/TV Asahi series program "Ninkimono de Ikou!".

== Track listing ==
1. Daydream Café
2. Daydream Café ～Nightdream Mix by Y・F
3. Daydream Café (original backing track)

== Charts ==
"Daydream Café" – Oricon Sales Chart (Japan)

Release	Chart	Peak Position	Sales Total	Chart Run
May 12, 1999	Oricon Daily Singles Chart			
May 12, 1999	Oricon Weekly Singles Chart	#41	10,360	2 weeks
May 12, 1999	Oricon Yearly Singles Chart			
