= Yura Yura (Vibration) =

"Yura・Yura～Vibration (Swaying vibration)"

Single by Fayray

from the album Craving
- Released: October 21, 1998
- Genre: J-Pop
- Length: 10:45
- Label: Antinos Records
- Songwriter(s): Akio Inoue, Daisuke Asakura

Fayray singles chronology
"Taiyou no Gravity" (1998)	"Yura・Yura～Vibration (Swaying vibration)" (1998)	"Powder Veil" (1999)

"Yura・Yura～Vibration" is Fayray's second single. It was released on October 21, 1998, and peaked at #28. The song was used as the ending theme for the Fuji TV program "Hey! Hey! Hey! Music Champ".

== Track listing ==
1. Yura・Yura～Vibration (Swaying vibration)
2. Neon Tetra
3. Yura・Yura～Vibration (original backing track)

== Charts ==
"Yura・Yura～Vibration" - Oricon Sales Chart (Japan)

Release	Chart	Peak Position	Sales Total	Chart Run
October 21, 1998	Oricon Daily Singles Chart			
October 21, 1998	Oricon Weekly Singles Chart	28	35,880	5 weeks
October 21, 1998	Oricon Yearly Singles Chart			
