= Nete mo Samete mo =

Studio album by Fayray
- Released: January 14, 2009
- Recorded: 2006–2008
- Genre: Pop
- Length: 41:14
- Label: R and C
- Producer: Fayray, Rusty Santos

Fayray chronology
Hikari to Kage (2006)	Nete mo Samete mo (2009)

Singles from Nete mo Samete mo
- 1. "Hitori Yori Futari" Released: September 27, 2006; 2. "Zero" Released: July 11, 2007

Nete mo Samete mo (寝ても醒めても, "Whether Awake or Asleep") is Japanese singer songwriter Fayray's eighth studio album and first in 3 years. The album was released January 14, 2009.

== Release ==
The song "Hitori Yori Futari" (ひとりよりふたり) was released on September 27, 2006, as the first single to promote Nete mo Samete mo. It peaked at #79 on Oricon Sales Chart. The song was used as the theme song for the NHK morning drama "Imo Tako Nankin". The coupled song is a cover of Hedy West's "500 Miles".

The second single, "Zero", was released on July 11, 2007. The song was used as the theme song for the TBS TV Soap opera My Fair Boy. The coupling is a cover of Marvin Gaye's "Forever" (from his 1965 album How Sweet It Is to Be Loved by You).

== Track listing ==
No.	Title	Lyrics	Music	Length
1.	"Jokyoku" (序曲 "Overture")		Fayray	36
2.	"Ru Ra Ra" (るらら "Lu La La")	Fayray	Fayray	4:12
3.	"Nagareboshi" (流れ星 "Shooting Star")	Fayray	Fayray	2:55
4.	"Sayonara" (さよなら "Goodbye")	Fayray	Fayray	1:59
5.	"Hi no Ataru Umi" (陽の当たる海 "An Ocean Under the Sun")	Fayray	Fayray, Rusty Santos	2:29
6.	"By The Fire"	Fayray	Fayray, Santos	3:54
7.	"Nete mo Samete mo" (寝ても醒めても "Whether Awake or Asleep")	Fayray	Fayray	4:31
8.	"Ai no Rizumu" (愛のリズム "The Rhythm of Love")		Fayray	2:12
9.	"Ii na" (いいな "Nice")	Fayray	Fayray	3:03
10.	"Lullaby"	Santos	Santos	3:00
11.	"Ruby"	Fayray	Fayray	3:49
12.	"Zero"	Fayray	Fayray	4:00
13.	"Hitori Yori Futari"	Fayray	Fayray	4:34
Total length:				41:14

== Charts and sales ==
Chart (2009)	Peak position	Sales
Japan Oricon Weekly Albums Chart	105	1,321

=== Singles ===
"Hitori Yori Futari" - Oricon Sales Chart (Japan)

Release	Chart	Peak Position	Sales Total	Chart Run
September 27, 2006	Oricon Daily Singles Chart			
September 27, 2006	Oricon Weekly Singles Chart	#79	2,473	4 weeks
September 27, 2006	Oricon Yearly Singles Chart			

"Zero" - Oricon Sales Chart (Japan)

Release	Chart	Peak Position	Sales Total	Chart Run
July 11, 2007	Oricon Weekly Singles Chart	127	646	1 week
