= Look into My Eyes (Fayray song) =

Single by Fayray

from the album HOURGLASS
- Released: March 17, 2004
- Genre: J-Pop
- Length: 8:32
- Label: R&C Japan
- Songwriter(s): Fayray
- Producer(s): Fayray

Fayray singles chronology
"Negai" (2004)	"Look into My Eyes" (2004)	"Aishite mo Aishitarinai" (2004)

"Look into My Eyes" is Fayray's 16th single. It was released, just a month after "Negai", on March 17, 2004 and peaked at #35. The song was used as the opening theme for the Yomiuri TV/Nippon TV series drama "Ranpo R" for which she also sang the theme song. The coupling is a cover of Carole Bayer Sager's "Don't Cry Out Loud".

== Track listing ==
1. Look into My Eyes
2. Don't Cry Out Loud

== Charts ==
"Look into My Eyes" - Oricon Sales Chart (Japan)

Release	Chart	Peak Position	Sales Total	Chart Run
March 17, 2004	Oricon Daily Singles Chart			
March 17, 2004	Oricon Weekly Singles Chart	#35	7,651	5 weeks
March 17, 2004	Oricon Yearly Singles Chart			
