= Personal stereo =

Portable audio player

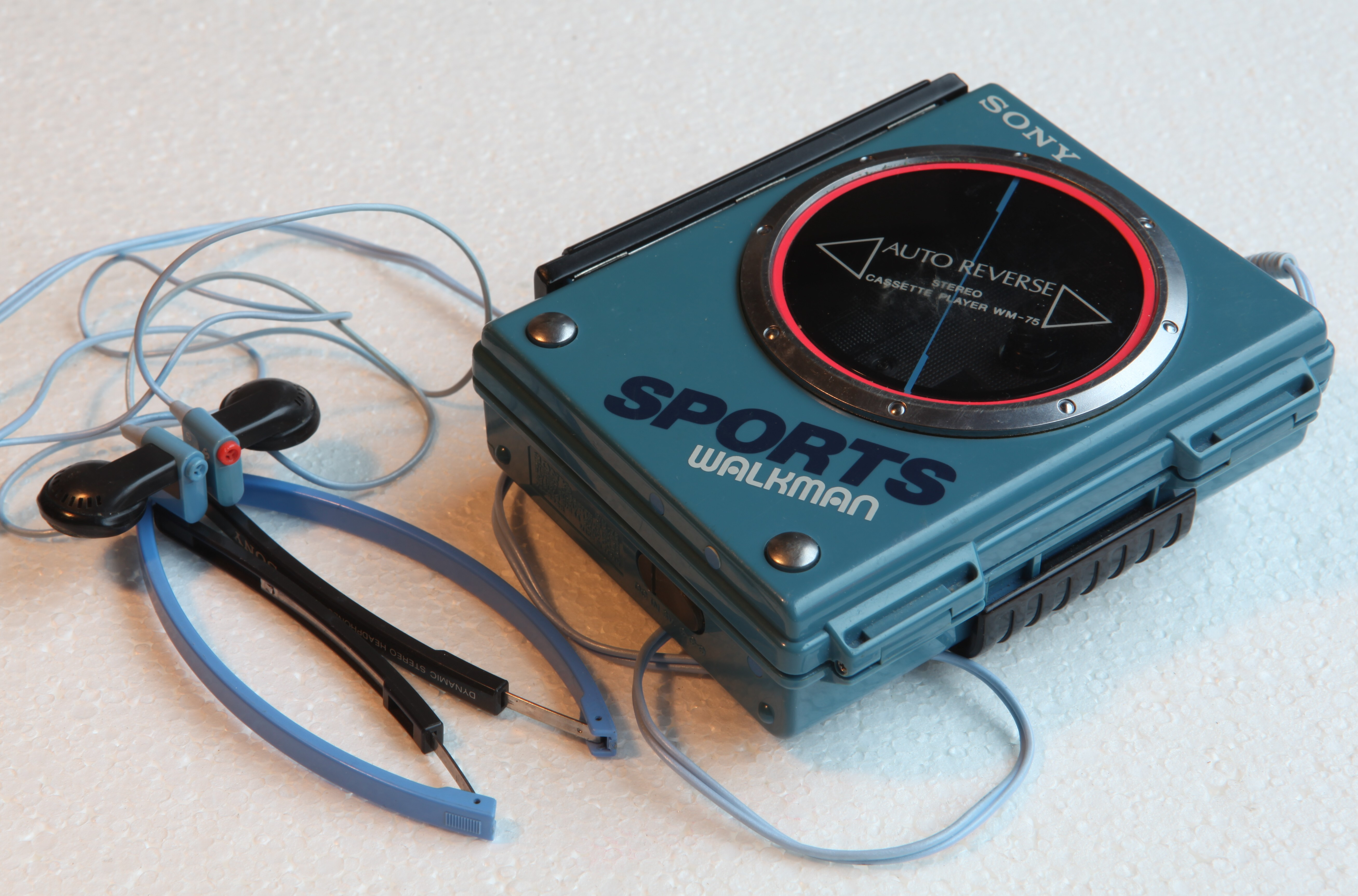
A Sony WM-75 Sports Walkman

A personal stereo, or personal cassette player, is a portable audio player for cassette tapes. This allows the user to listen to music through headphones while walking, jogging or relaxing. Personal stereos typically have a belt clip or a shoulder strap so a user can attach the device to a belt or wear it over their shoulder. Some personal stereos came with a separate battery case. With invention of compact radios based on transistors and integrated circuits and there was also many portable radio receivers with the support of FM stereo (optionally with AM, MW, LW) on the market.

== History ==
The Sony Walkman was released in 1979, created by Akio Morita, Masaru Ibuka (the co-founders of Sony) and Kozo Ohsone. It became a popular and widely imitated consumer item in the 1980s. In everyday language, walkman became a generic term, referring to any personal stereo, regardless of producer or brand. The spread of personal stereo devices contributed to tape cassettes outselling vinyl records for the first time in 1983. The introduction of the personal stereo coincided with the 1980s aerobics vogue, making it very popular to listen to music during workouts. Moreover, the prevalence of portable cassette players correlates with a 30-percent increase in people walking for exercise between 1987 and 1997.

In the 1990s, portable CD players became the most popular personal stereos.

With the rise of free-to-listen FM stereo stations broadcasting commercial music and talk shows 24/7, small size personal FM stereo devices that use plugged-in wired headsets as antennas have become cheaper alternatives to listening commercial music on tapes and CDs. At the same time, many personal cassette and CD players had built-in FM and AM.

In the 2000s, digital players like the iPod became the dominant personal stereos. During this period, cell phones and smartphones also became popular music listening devices. Most of digital players and mobile phones has built-in FM stereo receiver, and some devices (Sony Ericsson W980, Nokia N79) has also built-in FM stereo transmitter for microbroadcasting.

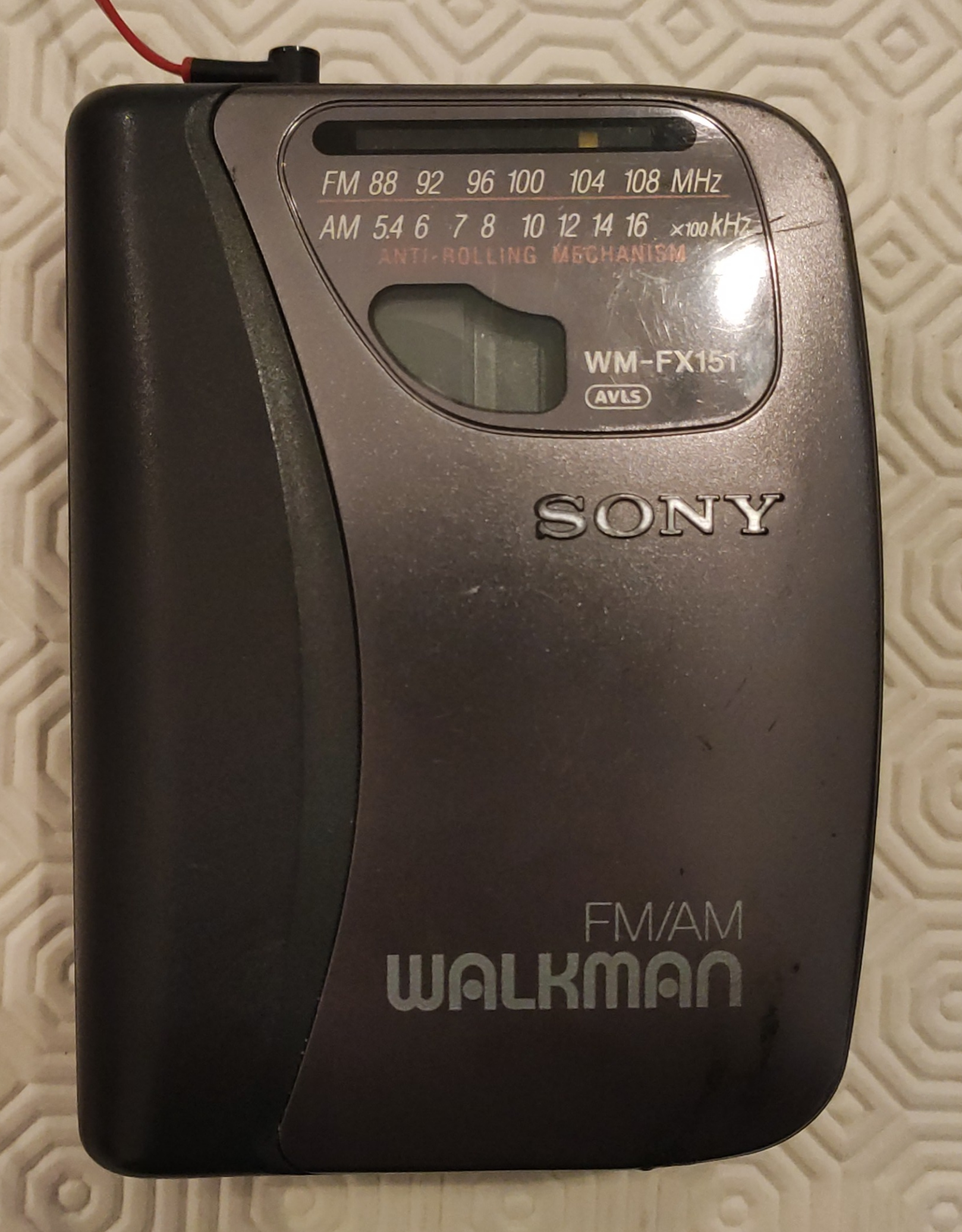
Sony Walkman WM-FX151

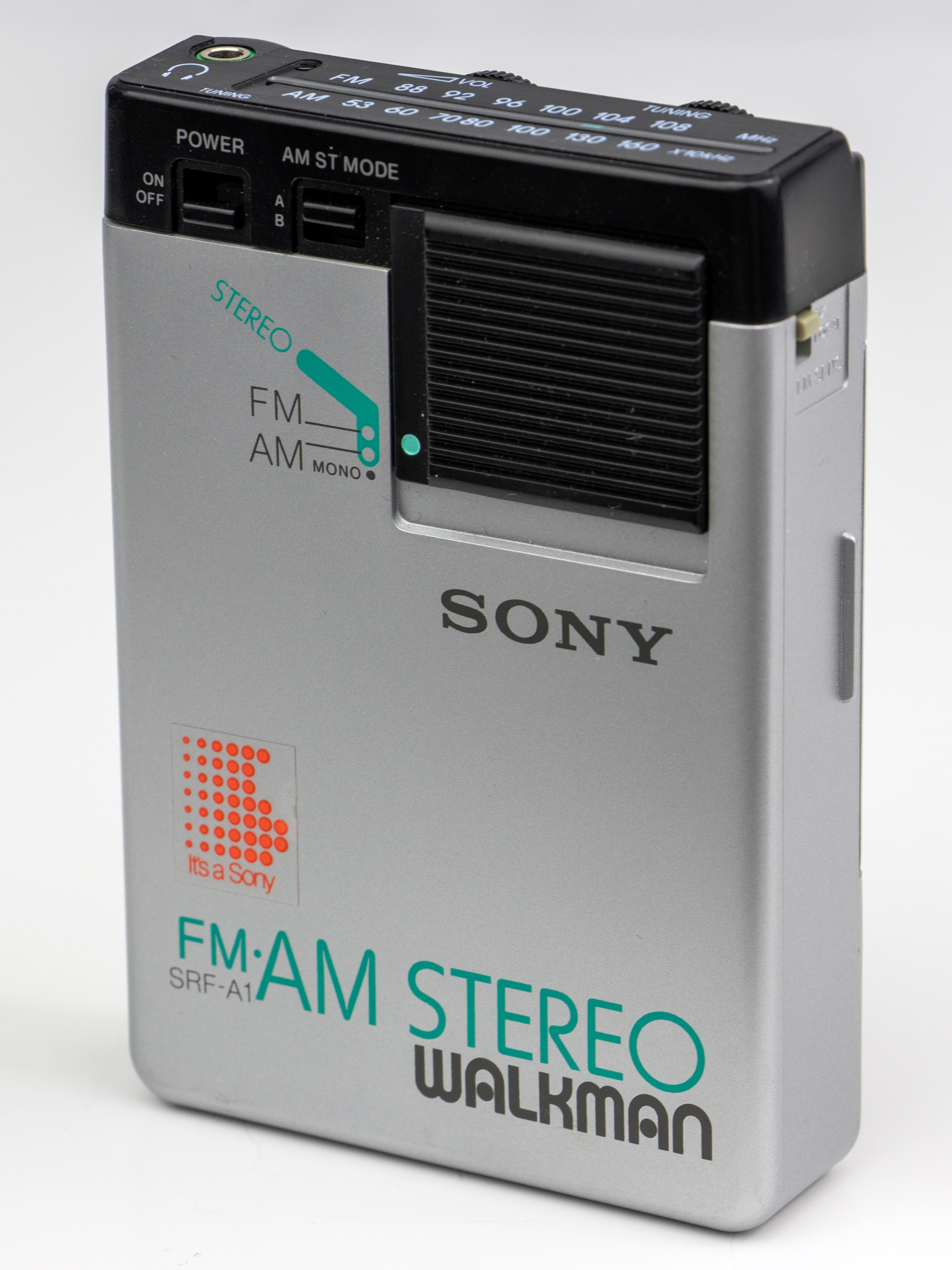
Sony Walkman SRF-A

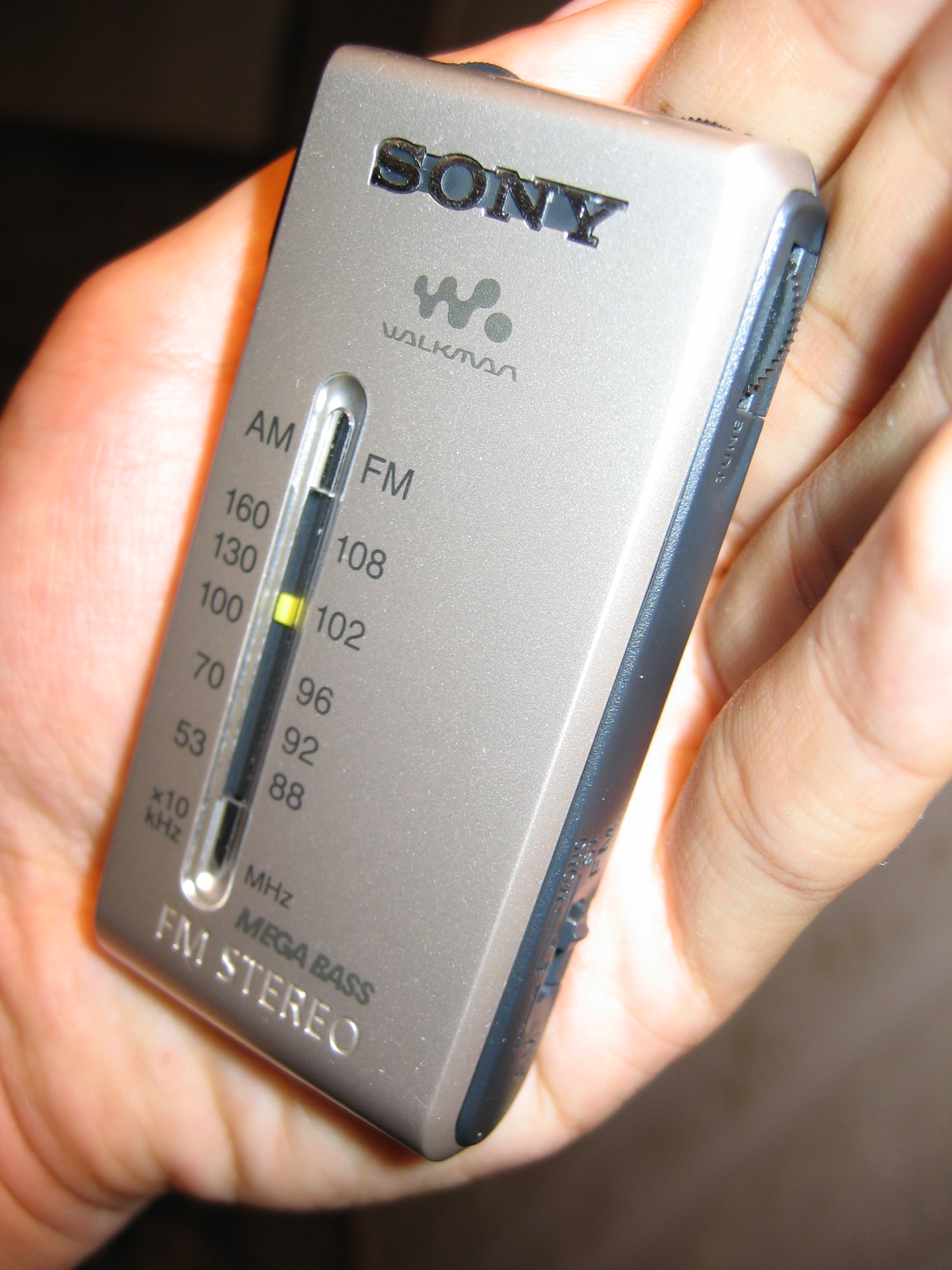
Sony Walkman SRF-S84

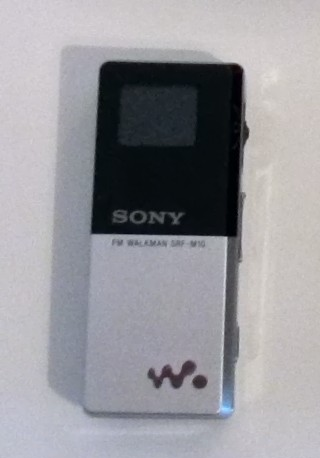
Sony Walkman SRF-M10

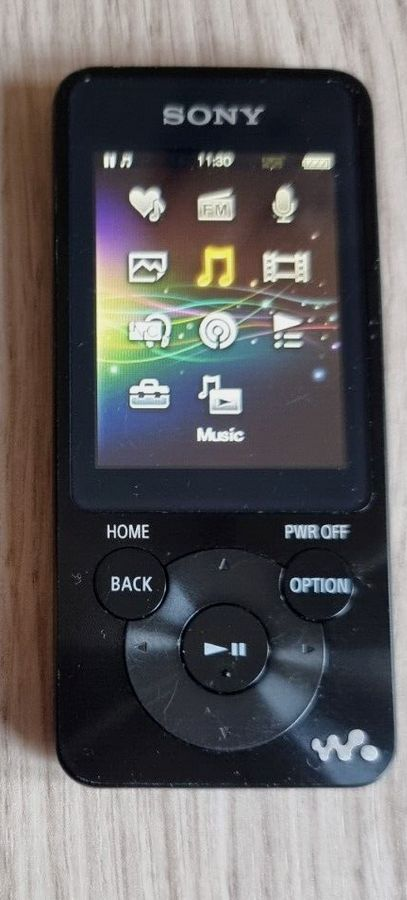
Sony NWZ-E585 Walkman

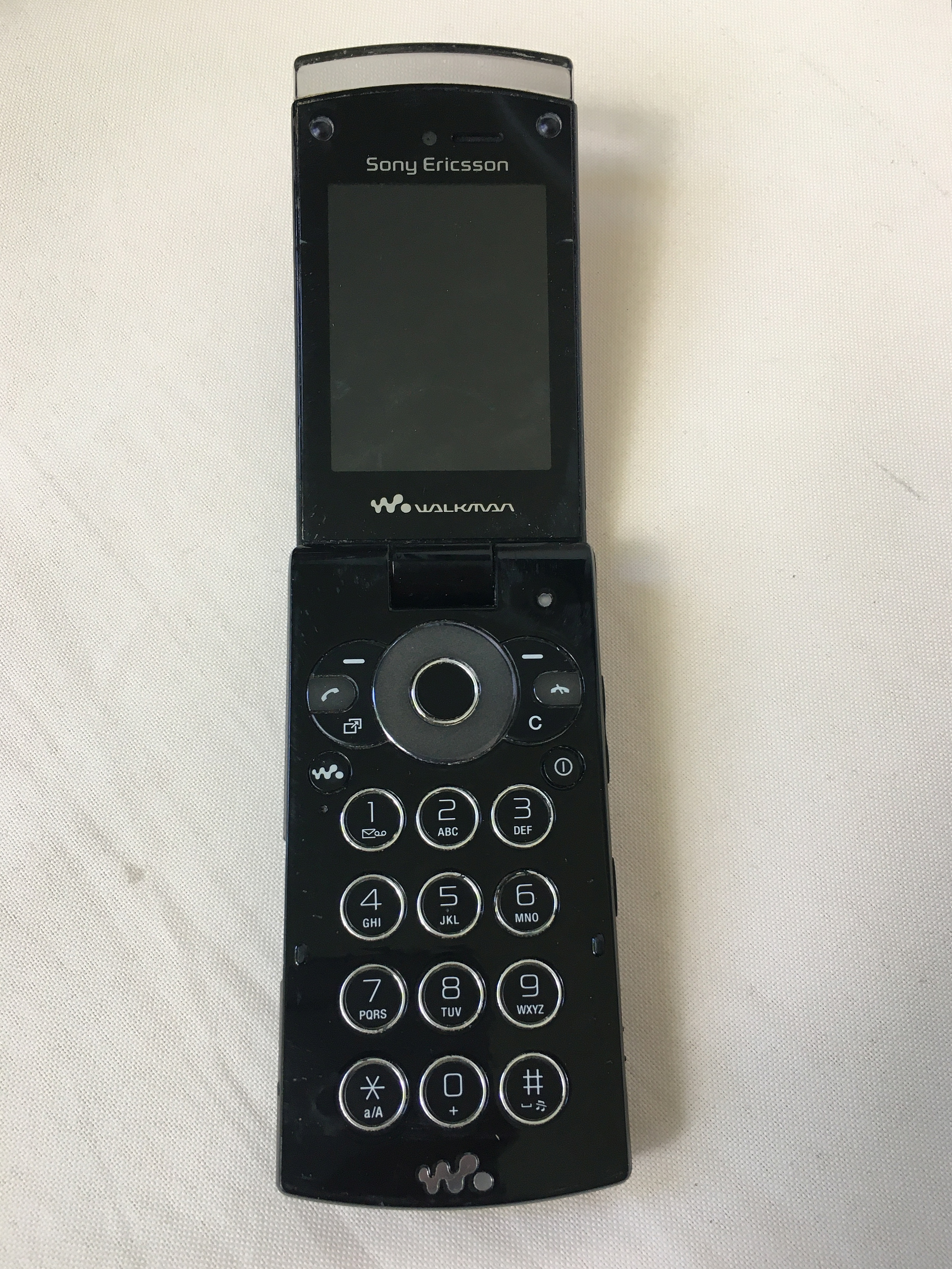
Sony Ericsson W980
