= Craving (album) =

Studio album by Fayray
- Released: May 26, 1999
- Recorded: 1998–1999
- Genre: Pop
- Length: 45:14
- Label: Antinos Records
- Producer: Daisuke Asakura

Fayray chronology
Craving (1999)	Ever After (2000)

Singles from Craving
- 1. "Taiyō no Gravity" Released: July 29, 1998; 2. "Yura Yura" Released: October 21, 1998; 3. "Powder Veil" Released: February 10, 1999; 4. "Daydream Cafe" Released: May 12, 1999; 5. "Same Night, Same Face" Released: October 14, 1999

Craving is Japanese singer songwriter Fayray's first studio album, released on May 26, 1999. The album was produced by Daisuke Asakura.

== Track listing ==
No.	Title	Lyrics	Music	Length
1.	"In Four: Love Always,"		Fayray	1:55
2.	"Taiyō no Gravity"	Akio Inoue	Daisuke Asakura	4:05
3.	"Neon Tetra"	Inoue	Asakura	4:09
4.	"Daydream Cafe"	Inoue	Asakura	4:06
5.	"Pure White"	Inoue	Asakura	4:37
6.	"Same Night, Same Face"	Inoue	Asakura	5:03
7.	"Yura Yura"	Inoue	Asakura	3:15
8.	"Untouchable Girls"	Inoue	Asakura	4:31
9.	"Powder Veil"	Inoue	Asakura	4:52
10.	"Craving"	Fayray	Fayray, Asakura	4:21
11.	"Daydream Cafe (Da Mix)"	Inoue	Asakura	4:13
Total length:				45:14

== Charts and sales ==
Chart (1999)	Peak position	Sales
Japan Oricon Weekly Albums Chart	10	75,770
