= Suki da Nante Ienai =

"好きだなんて言えない (Suki da Nante Ienai)"

Single by Fayray

from the album Shiroi Hana
- Released: January 29, 2003
- Genre: J-Pop
- Length: 12:04
- Label: avex trax
- Songwriter(s): Fayray
- Producer(s): Fayray

Fayray singles chronology
"touch me, kiss me" (2002)	"好きだなんて言えない (Suki da Nante Ienai)" (2003)	"Negai" (2004)

"Suki da Nante Ienai" (好きだなんて言えない, "I Can't Say I Love You") is Fayray's 14th single and last on avex trax. It was released on January 29, 2003, and peaked on the Oricon chart at #19. The song was used as the theme song for the Yomiuri TV/Nippon TV series drama "Message Kotoba ga, Uragitte Iku". The coupling is a cover of Janis Ian's "Love Is Blind".

== Track listing ==
1. I Can't Say I Love You (好きだなんて言えない, Suki da Nante Ienai)
2. Love is Blind
3. I Can't Say I Love You (好きだなんて言えない, Suki da Nante Ienai)(instrumental)

== Charts ==
"Suki da Nante Ienai" - Oricon Sales Chart (Japan)

Release	Chart	Peak Position	Sales Total	Chart Run
January 29, 2003	Oricon Weekly Singles Chart	#19	18,424	6 weeks
