= Remember (Fayray song) =

Single by Fayray

from the album Shiroi Hana
- Released: February 20, 2002
- Genre: J-Pop
- Length: 9:10
- Label: avex trax
- Songwriter(s): Fayray
- Producer(s): Fayray

Fayray singles chronology
"Over" (2001)	"Remember" (2002)	"stay" (2002)

"Remember" is Fayray's 11th single. It was released on February 20, 2002 and peaked at #52. It was used as the image song for the TV program "20th Anniversary 2002 Yokohama Kokusai Shoujo Ekiden". The coupling is a cover of Daryl Hall & John Oates's "Private Eyes".

== Track listing ==
1. Remember
2. Private Eyes

== Charts ==
"Remember" - Oricon Sales Chart (Japan)

Release	Chart	Peak Position	Sales Total	Chart Run
February 20, 2002	Oricon Daily Singles Chart			
February 20, 2002	Oricon Weekly Singles Chart	#52	7,430	2 weeks
February 20, 2002	Oricon Yearly Singles Chart			
