= Negai (Fayray song) =

"願い (Negai)"

Single by Fayray

from the album HOURGLASS
- Released: February 18, 2004
- Genre: J-Pop
- Length: 7:34
- Label: R&C Japan
- Songwriter(s): Fayray
- Producer(s): Fayray

Fayray singles chronology
"Suki da Nante Ienai" (2003)	"願い (Negai)" (2004)	"look into my eyes" (2004)

"Negai" is Fayray's 15th single and first on the R&C Japan record label. It was released on February 18, 2004 and peaked at #22 on the charts. The song was used as the theme song for the Yomiuri TV/Nippon TV series drama "Ranpo R". The coupling is a cover of Dusty Springfield's "Spooky".

== Track listing ==
1. 願い (Negai; Wish)
2. Spooky

== Charts ==
"Negai" - Oricon Sales Chart (Japan)

Release	Chart	Peak Position	Sales Total	Chart Run
February 18, 2004	Oricon Weekly Singles Chart	22	21,458	7 weeks
