= Same Night, Same Face =

"Same night, same face"

Single by Fayray

from the album CRAVING
- Released: October 14, 1999
- Genre: J-Pop
- Length: 13:51
- Label: Antinos Records
- Songwriter(s): Akio Inoue, Daisuke Asakura

Fayray singles chronology
"Daydream Cafe" (1999)	"Same night, same face" (1999)	"MY EYES" (2000)

"Same night, same face" is Fayray's 5th single and first re-cut single. IThe song was used as the image song for the PlayStation Gamesoft "ZILL O'LL" as well as the ending theme for the ABC/TV Asahi series program "Ninkimono de Ikou!". "No, never" was used as the ending theme for the Fuji TV program "Uhhhya~!! Hanasaka London Boots". "Sono Ai no Katachi (Pieces of that love)" was used as the ending theme for the WOWOW program "Tokyo LONBOO Tower".

== Track listing ==
1. Same night, same face
2. No, never
3. その愛のかたち (Sono Ai no Katachi; Pieces of that love)

== Charts ==
"Same night, same face" - Oricon Sales Chart (Japan)

Release	Chart	Peak Position	Sales Total	Chart Run
October 14, 1999	Oricon Daily Singles Chart			
October 14, 1999	Oricon Weekly Singles Chart	48	7,680	2 weeks
October 14, 1999	Oricon Yearly Singles Chart			
