= Aishite mo Aishitarinai =

"愛しても愛し足りない (Aishite mo Aishitarinai)"

Single by Fayray

from the album HOURGLASS
- Released: May 26, 2004
- Genre: J-Pop
- Length: 14:33
- Label: R&C Japan
- Songwriter(s): Fayray
- Producer(s): Fayray

Fayray singles chronology
"look into my eyes" (2004)	"愛しても愛し足りない (Aishite mo Aishitarinai)" (2004)	"Kuchizuke" (2004)

"Aishite mo Aishitarinai" is Fayray's 17th single. It was released on May 26, 2004, and peaked at #46. It was used as insert song for the Kansai TV/Fuji TV series drama "At Home Dad" and "At Home Dad Special". The coupling is a cover of "My Funny Valentine".

== Track listing ==
1. 愛しても愛し足りない (Aishite mo Aishitarinai; No matter how much I love you, it's never enough)
2. My Funny Valentine
3. 愛しても愛し足りない Guitar Version

== Charts ==
"Aishite mo Aishitarinai" - Oricon Sales Chart (Japan)

Release	Chart	Peak Position	Sales Total	Chart Run
May 26, 2004	Oricon Daily Singles Chart			
May 26, 2004	Oricon Weekly Singles Chart	#46	10,975	6 weeks
May 26, 2004	Oricon Yearly Singles Chart			
