= Hyper-globalization =

Increase in globalization since the 1990s

Hyper-globalization is the dramatic change in the size, scope, and velocity of globalization that began in the late 1990s and that continues into the beginning of the 21st century. It covers all three main dimensions of economic globalization, cultural globalization, and political globalization. The concept first arose in the 2011 work by Dani Rodrik, an economist and professor of International Political Economy at the Kennedy School of Government at Harvard University, who described it in The Globalization Paradox. Rodrik criticized the state of globalization, questioning the wisdom of unlimited economic integration beyond national borders. He sees a conflict between the workings of the nation state and free flow economic globalization that has gone too far "toward an impractical version that we might call hyperglobalization".

In 2013, economists at the Peterson Institute for International Economics, Arvind Subramanian and Martin Kessler invoked the concept in "The Hyperglobalization of Trade and Its Future", to describe the dramatic increase in world trade that has occurred since the founding of the World Trade Organization in 1995.

Public Relations consultant and academician, Takashi Inoue extended the concept to beyond the economics into the realms of culture and politics in his 2018 book Public Relations in Hyper-Globalization; He argues that the world is being transformed by three forces of hyper-globalization: economic, social media, and new disruptive technologies that together are accelerating the pace of change in all spheres. Inoue argues that this is the new reality in which leaders must now operate in.

== Hyper-globalization as globalization gone too far ==
Dani Rodrik defines hyper-globalization as a type of globalization aimed at the elimination of all transaction costs associated with the movement between the natural borders of nation states of goods, services, capital and finance. These costs are not limited to just tariffs and quotas, but also includes things such as domestic regulations, standards, rules on product safety, rules on intellectual property, and banking regulations. In other words, Rodrik sees hyper-globalization as a type of globalization that allows multinational companies to avoid the rules and regulations of nation states. The deep integration of hyper-globalization conflicts with and threatens the sovereignty of the nation state. Rodrik concludes that hyper-globalization is globalization that has gone too far. He rejects the solution of using intergovernmental organizations as a way to provide governance, because by definition that requires nation states to give up sovereignty and thus it is not compatible with democracy. He does not argue to stop or reduce globalization, but rather to change the rules of globalization away from hyper-globalization to activity that does not conflict with national sovereignty.

== Hyper-globalization’s origins, its size, scope and its velocity ==
Subramanian and Kessler argue that the world is now in an era of "hyper-globalization, where world trade has soared much more rapidly than world GDP". They note that in the period since the late 1990s, there was a surge in economic activity in the developing world. Prior to the late 1990s, only 30 percent of the developing world or 21 countries out of 72 were catching up to the United States as the economic frontier, but since the late 1990s that number jumped nearly 75 percent or 75 out of 103 countries. The rate at which convergence with the U.S. was occurring jumped from 1.5 percent per capita per year to 3.3 percent per capita after the late 1990s. They call the period between 1870 and 1914 the Golden Age of globalization in which world trade in terms of gross domestic product went from a 9 percent to 16 percent share. However, in the current age of hyper-globalization, which includes both goods and services, the gross domestic product share has reached 33 percent. They explain that China, which gained entry into the World Trade Organization in 2001, has become the world's sole mega-trader. At the height of the Golden Age of globalization in 1913 Great Britain was the world's megatrader with its share of gross domestic product of 18.5 percent. In contrast, China's share of gross domestic product has reached 50%.

== Three forces of hyper-globalization ==
Takashi Inoue describes three forces of hyper-globalization:

1. Economic force in which extensive growth in global trade creates cross-border economic integration,
2. Human communications force via the Internet in which instant and global communication of social media and the Internet are changing norms of human communication blurring social barriers, and
3. Technological disruption force coming from new innovations in technology driven by Internet-of-Things (IoT), big data, and Artificial Intelligence (AI) bringing massive economic and rapid social changes leading to a world of Singularity.

His main argument is that these three forces are creating a new reality for which global leaders must now be proficient in stakeholder relationship management of strategic public relations.

== End of hyper-globalization ==
Amidst the 2022 Russian invasion of Ukraine and the subsequent sanctions imposed as a result of the conflict, Rodrik argued that it "probably put a nail in the coffin of hyperglobalization".
