= Taiyō no Gravity =

"太陽のグラヴィティー (Taiyou no Gravity)"

Single by Fayray

from the album CRAVING
- Released: July 29, 1998
- Genre: J-Pop
- Length: 16:41
- Label: Antinos Records
- Songwriter(s): Akio Inoue, Daisuke Asakura

Fayray singles chronology
"太陽のグラヴィティー (Taiyou no Gravity)" (1998)	"YURA・YURA～Vibration" (1998)

"Taiyou no Gravity" is Fayray's debut single. It was released on July 29, 1998. It first entered the charts at #20 but 3 weeks later climbed to #12. The song was used as the theme song for the TBS drama "Hitoribocchi no Kimi ni".

== Track listing ==
1. 太陽のグラヴィティー (Taiyou no Gravity; Gravity of the sun)
2. 太陽のグラヴィティー (HOT CHILI NACHOS MIX)
3. 太陽のグラヴィティー (SP-1200 MIX)
4. 太陽のグラヴィティー (original backing track)

== Charts ==
"Taiyou no Gravity" - Oricon Sales Chart (Japan)

Release	Chart	Peak Position	Sales Total	Chart Run
July 29, 1998	Oricon Daily Singles Chart			
July 29, 1998	Oricon Weekly Singles Chart	12	150,500	10 weeks
July 29, 1998	Oricon Yearly Singles Chart			
