= Stay (Fayray song) =

Single by Fayray

from the album Shiroi Hana
- Released: May 9, 2002
- Genre: J-Pop
- Length: 8:58
- Label: Avex Trax
- Songwriter: Fayray
- Producer: Fayray

Fayray singles chronology
"Remember" (2002)	"Stay" (2002)	"Touch Me, Kiss Me" (2002)

"Stay" is Fayray's 12th single. It was released on May 9, 2002 and peaked at #24. The song was used in a commercial for Kanebo's Kate cosmetics line and also served as ending theme for the TV Asahi program Matthew's Best Hit TV. The coupling is a cover of Leon Russell's "A Song for You".

== Track listing ==
1. Stay
2. A Song for You

== Charts ==
"Stay" - Oricon Sales Chart (Japan)

Release	Chart	Peak Position	Sales Total	Chart Run
May 9, 2002	Oricon Daily Singles Chart			
May 9, 2002	Oricon Weekly Singles Chart	#24	14,420	3 weeks
May 9, 2002	Oricon Yearly Singles Chart			
