= Covers (Fayray album) =

Studio album by Fayray
- Released: June 8, 2005
- Recorded: 2005
- Genre: Pop, rock, jazz
- Length: 48:03
- Label: R and C
- Producer: Fayray

Fayray chronology
Hourglass (2004)	Covers (2005)	Hikari to Kage (2006)

Covers is Japanese singer songwriter Fayray's sixth studio album and her only cover album, released June 8, 2005.

== Track listing ==
No.	Title	Original artist	Length
1.	"Heaven"	The Psychedelic Furs	6:24
2.	"Dreams"	Fleetwood Mac	4:50
3.	"Angel"	Jimi Hendrix	4:39
4.	"The First Time Ever I Saw Your Face"	Roberta Flack	2:59
5.	"I Wanna Be Free"	The Monkees	5:04
6.	"Tiny Dancer"	Elton John	4:25
7.	"This Is Love"	PJ Harvey	5:35
8.	"Moonchild"	King Crimson	3:39
9.	"I Believe in You"	Neil Young	4:45
10.	"The Wind"	Cat Stevens	2:37
Total length:			48:03

== Charts and sales ==
Chart (2005)	Peak position	Sales
Japan Oricon Weekly Albums Chart	30	10,904
