= Shoko Inoue =

Japanese singer (born 1969)

- Born: 21 July 1969 (age 56); Yawatahama, Ehime
- Occupation: singer

Shōko Inoue (井上昌己, Inoue Shōko, born Yawatahama, Ehime, 21 July 1969) is a Japanese singer best known outside Japan for her songs for Saint Tail in 1995 and 1996.

== Albums ==
- Ai no Kamisama, koi no Tenshi 愛の神様 恋の天使 (1993)
- Sweet (1994 mini-album)
- Bitter (1994 mini-album)
- Fair Way (1994)
- Fair Way Live (1995 live)
- Bitter II (1995 mini-album)
- Sweet II (1995 mini-album)
- Up Side Down (1996)
- Retsu Ai 熱愛 (1998)
- Bana Orange Berry バナ・オレンジ・ベリー (2002)
- Shokoland 2nd (2003 )
- Brand-New Feel (2008)
- Precious Moment (2009)
