= Alice Inoue =

American astrologer and life coach

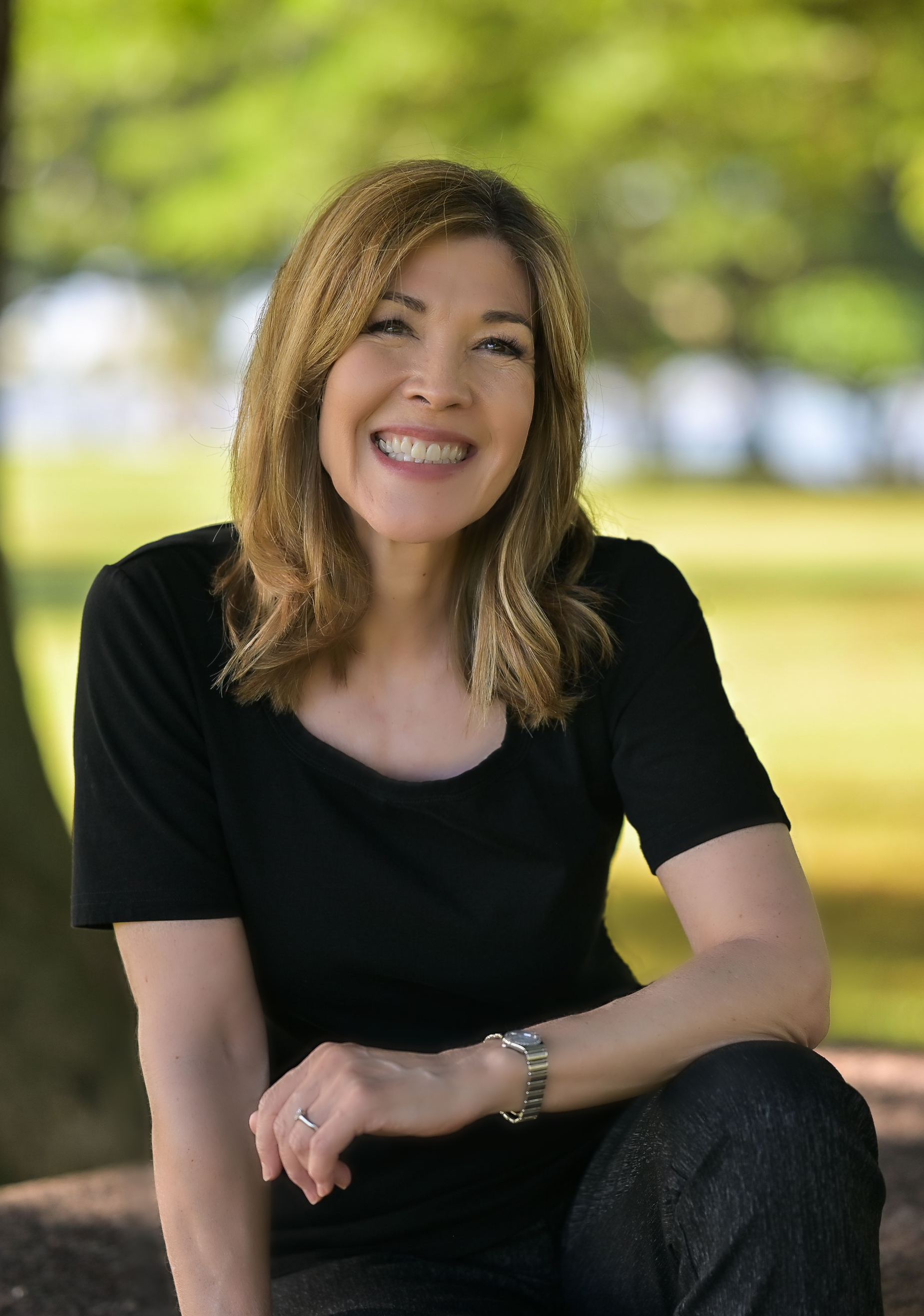
- Born: Alice Fong Leary; July 17, 1964 (age 62); San Francisco, California
- Education: University of California, Santa Cruz
- Occupations: Corporate trainer Business owner Life coach Astrologer
- Website: yourhappinessu.com

Alice Inoue (born July 17, 1964) is an American author, corporate trainer, business owner, and professional astrologer based in Hawaiʻi. She is the founder of Happiness U, a Honolulu-based personal development and corporate training company. Inoue is also the host of the YouTube series Following Journeys, which explores the personal and professional paths of entrepreneurs and business leaders through astrology.

Inoue is the creator of the Master Your Superpowers personality framework, introduced in her 2019 book of the same name and later expanded in subsequent publications.

== Early life and education ==
Inoue was born in San Francisco, California, to a Chinese mother and German-Irish father. From the age of eight, she was raised bilingually in Taiwan, speaking both English and Mandarin. Graduating from Morrison Academy in 1981, Inoue returned to the United States to continue her education. She attended the University of California, Santa Cruz where she studied for four years, earning a degree in Biology as a pre-med student. Instead of pursuing medical school, Inoue moved to Japan to teach English while at the same time learned to speak Japanese.

== Career ==
Inoue began a career change in the late 1990s. After being told by an astrologer that she would be changing career paths, two years later, her television contracts reached their end and she was unemployed. Inoue was quoted as saying "that moment I knew that this is what I've come here to do." She began focusing on astrology and taking courses on feng shui.

=== Media career ===
Inoue began her media career in television, including hosting Do Sports on Fuji News, a program highlighting activities for Japanese tourists visiting Hawaiʻi. At the height of her television career, she hosted three television shows and had four major sponsors.

In 2008 she joined forces with Oceanic Time Warner Cable to produce a series of feng shui instructional DVDs based on her signature presentations. Inoue performs work as a life guide under her consultancy Alice Inoue Life Guidance.

She has appeared in regional publications including MidWeek, Hawaii Business Magazine, Pacific Business News, Honolulu Star-Bulletin, and other Hawaiʻi-based outlets.

Inoue later became a frequent guest commentator on Hawaiʻi television news programs discussing astrology and annual forecasts. She has appeared on KHON2 and Hawaii News Now, where she has been identified as an author, life coach, and professional astrologer of over 25 years.

=== Happiness U and corporate training ===
In 2013, Inoue expanded her consultancy to include Happiness U, originally described as a school for adults in Honolulu providing guidance on life and personal development.

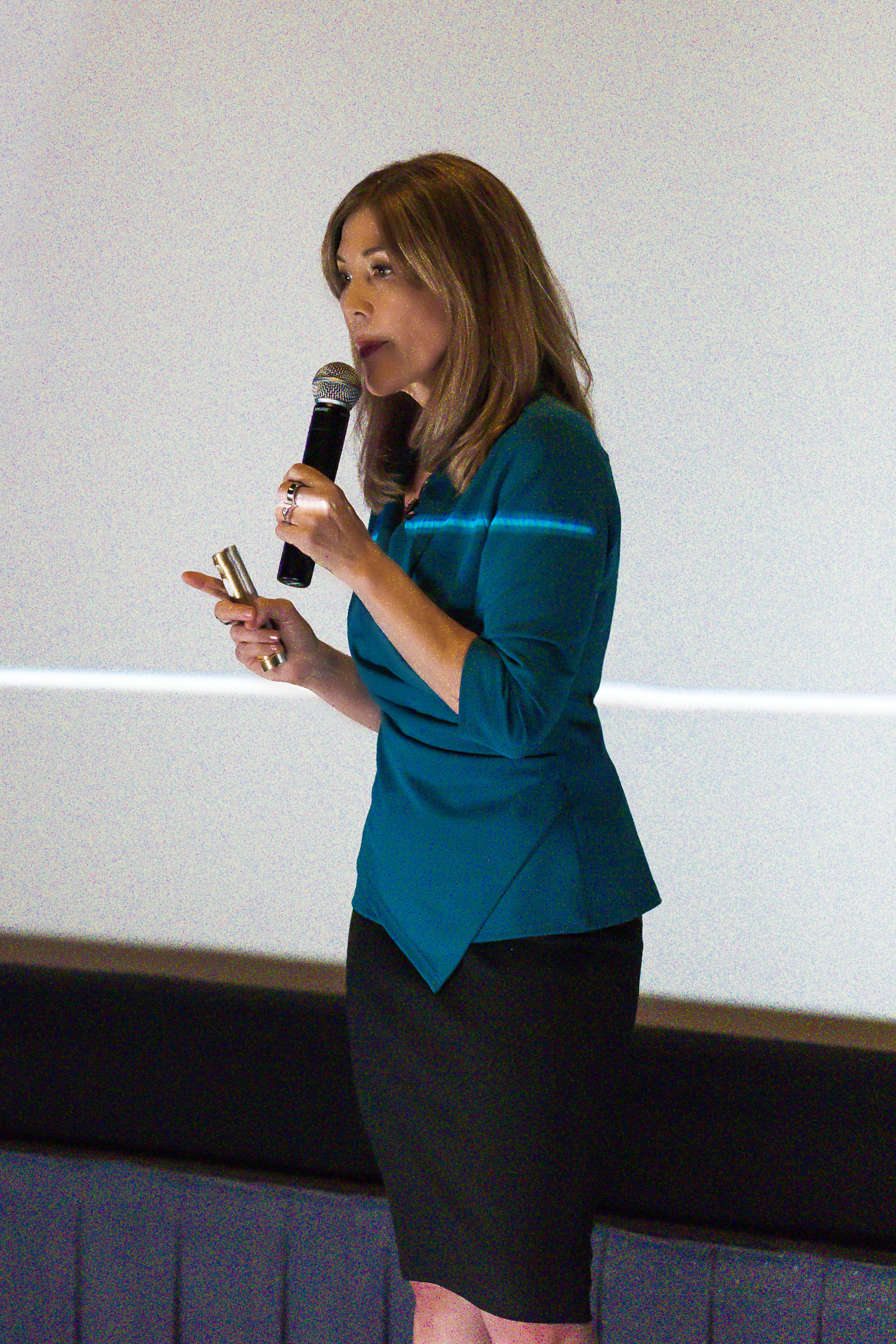
Inoue speaking at the Following Journeys 2026 Forecast at Ward Consolidated Theatres in Honolulu, HI (2026)

It was reported at the time that she had provided guidance to approximately 3,000 individuals, including 500 regular clients. The company later shifted its focus toward corporate training, wellbeing programs, and team development initiatives. Inoue developed the Master Your Superpowers personality assessment system, which she applies in corporate leadership and resilience training programs.

== Other works ==
=== Writing ===
Inoue is an author whose work focuses on personal growth, mindfulness and wellbeing. Her early books include A Loving Guide to These Shifting Times (2008) and Be Happy! It’s Your Choice (2009), followed by additional titles exploring intentional living and self-reflection. She is a contributing author in the national best seller, Wake Up…Live the Life You Love with Passion, a compilation of self-development philosophies by great thinkers such as Deepak Chopra and Wayne Dyer.

In 2019, she released Master Your Superpowers, which introduced a personality framework based on the Chinese Five Elements, later expanded through additional books and training materials used in leadership development and corporate wellbeing programs. Her more recent publications include The Best of Mindful Moments – A Collection of Life Wisdom, Daily Mindful Moments – A Year of Life Wisdom, Master Your Superpowers – The Elemental System for Life and Work (2nd edition), and Open Now – What You See Is What You Need.

=== YouTube and public programming ===
Inoue hosts the YouTube series Following Journeys, which documents the life and professional journeys of Hawaiʻi entrepreneurs and business leaders using their astrological charts as a foundation.

=== Newspaper columns ===
Over the course of her career, Inoue authored several newspaper columns. These included “Go Ask Alice,” a weekly advice column focused on life guidance and feng shui, which received the Best Editorial Column award from the Hawaiʻi Publishers Association on 15 May 2014. She also wrote “Positively Young,” a weekly column that ran for approximately one year and was later profiled in Pacific Edge Magazine. In addition, she authored “A Mindful Moment,” a long-running column published from 2014 to 2024 in MidWeek, which focused on mindfulness, wellbeing, and personal development.

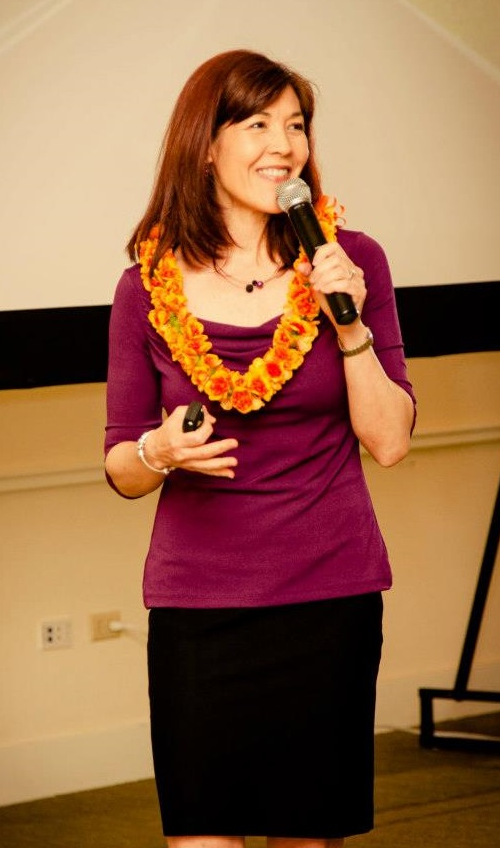
Inoue speaking at the opening of the Patsy T. Mink Center for Business & Leadership in Honolulu, HI (2014).

== Awards and recognition ==
Inoue has been nominated and/or won numerous awards for her writings. She was a finalist for the 2011 Indie Excellence Book Awards in the Mind, Body, Spirit category for her book Be Happy! It's Your Choice. Feng Shui Your Life! was a winner in the 2011 Indie Excellence Book Awards in the Mind, Body, Spirit category and Home and Office Interior Design. Just Ask Alice! was a finalist in the 2012 Indie Excellence Book Awards in the Mind, Body, Spirit category as well as a silver medalist in the Living Now Book Awards.

Inoue received two additional awards for her writing in 2013; the Evergreen Medal for Personal Growth for her book A Loving Guide to These Shifting Times and an Indie Excellence Award in the well-being category for her book Destination Happiness. Her recent book Daily Mindful Moments won the National Indie Excellence Awards in the Inspiration category in 2025.

== Bibliography ==
Year	Title	ISBN
2008	A Loving Guide to These Shifting Times	ISBN 9781419698217
2009	Be Happy! – It's Your Choice: Ten Ways to Keep Your Life Bright	ISBN 9781439255988
2009	Feng Shui Your Life!	ISBN 9781439276884
2011	Just Ask Alice	ISBN 9781456475352
2012	Destination Happiness: Everything You Need to Know to Stay on Course!	ISBN 9781479263424
2015	Mindful Moments: A Collection of Life Wisdom	ISBN 9781519154026
2017	More Mindful Moments: A Collection of Life Wisdom Paperback	ISBN 9781542639279
2019	Master Your Superpowers: An Invaluable Resource for Creating a Happy Life	ISBN 9781795062657
2022	The Best of Mindful Moments - A Collection of Life Wisdom	ISBN 979-8846899322
2025	Daily Mindful Moments – A Year of Life Wisdom	ISBN 979-8283055732
2025	Master Your Superpowers: The Elemental System for Life and Work 2nd Edition	ISBN 979-8294894269
2025	Open Now - What You See is What You Need: Daily Wisdom and Astrological Insights	ISBN 9798260359440
