= Shunsuke Inoue =

Japanese volleyball player (born 1985)

Personal information
- Nationality: Japanese
- Born: 4 June 1985 (age 41); Nagasaki, Nagasaki, Japan
- Height: 190 cm (6 ft 3 in)
- Weight: 78 kg (172 lb)
- Spike: 333 cm (131 in)
- Block: 320 cm (126 in)

Volleyball information
- Position: Setter

Career
Years	Teams
2008–2018	(Japan) JT Thunders

National team
2011–2013, 2015	Japan

Shunsuke Inoue (井上 俊輔, Inoue Shunsuke; born 4 June 1985) is a retired Japanese male volleyball player. He was part of the Japan men's national volleyball team. On club level, he only played for JT Thunders.
