= Kazuma Inoue =

Japanese footballer

Personal information
- Full name: Kazuma Inoue
- Date of birth: January 9, 1990 (age 36)
- Place of birth: Kanagawa, Japan
- Height: 1.77 m (5 ft 9 1/2 in)
- Position: Forward

Youth career
- 2008–2011: Tokai University

Senior career*
Years	Team	Apps	(Gls)
2012–2015	YSCC Yokohama	98	(12)
Total		98	(12)
- * Club domestic league appearances and goals

Kazuma Inoue (井上 和馬, Inoue Kazuma; born January 9, 1990) is a former Japanese football player.

== Playing career ==
Kazuma Inoue played for YSCC Yokohama from 2012 to 2015.
