= Hourglass (Fayray album) =

Studio album by Fayray
- Released: October 27, 2004
- Recorded: 2003–2004
- Genre: Pop
- Length: 53:55
- Label: R and C
- Producer: Fayray

Fayray chronology
Shiroi Hana (2003)	Hourglass (2004)	Covers (2005)

Singles from Hourglass
- 1. "Negai" Released: February 18, 2004; 2. "Look into My Eyes" Released: March 17, 2004; 3. "Aishite mo Aishitarinai" Released: May 26, 2004; 4. "Kuchizuke" Released: October 13, 2004

Hourglass is Japanese singer songwriter Fayray's fifth studio album and first under the R and C label. The album was released on October 27, 2004. "Saisho de Saigo no Koi" served as image song for the movie anime "Mind Game"."feel" used as insert song in the Kansai TV/Fuji TV drama "At Home Dad Special" as well as the ending theme for the Yomiuri TV/Nippon TV series program "Afurica no Tume".

== Track listing ==
All tracks are written by Fayray

No.	Title	Length
1.	"First Time"	4:04
2.	"Negai"	4:41
3.	"Saisho de Saigo no Koi" (最初で最後の恋 "My First and Last Love")	4:25
4.	"Feel"	5:17
5.	"Momi no Ki: Ki no Kumikyoku" (樅の木−樹の組曲− "Fir Tree: The Tree Suite")	2:31
6.	"Shiroi Nigatsu" (白い二月 "Snowy February")	5:01
7.	"Michi" (道 "Road")	3:31
8.	"Look into My Eyes"	4:45
9.	"Living Without You"	6:19
10.	"Kuchizuke"	3:52
11.	"Aishite mo Aishitarinai"	4:27
12.	"Namae" (名前 "Name")	4:31
Total length:		53:55

== Charts and sales ==
Chart (2004)	Peak position	Sales
Japan Oricon Daily Albums Chart	5	47,060
Japan Oricon Weekly Albums Chart	7	47,060
