= Kozo Watanabe =

Kozo Watanabe may refer to:

- Kozo Watanabe (engineer) (born 1942), Japanese automotive engineer for Nissan
- Kōzō Watanabe (Democratic Party politician) (1932–2020), Japanese politician
- Kōzō Watanabe (Liberal Democratic Party politician) (1942–2007), Japanese politician
