= Ever After (Fayray album) =

Studio album by Fayray
- Released: September 6, 2000
- Recorded: 2000–2001
- Genre: Pop
- Length: 47:38
- Label: Antinos Records
- Producer: Fayray

Fayray chronology
Craving (1999)	Ever After (2000)	Genuine (2001)

Singles from Ever After
- 1. "My Eyes" Released: March 23, 2000; 2. "Tears" Released: July 26, 2000

Ever After is Japanese singer songwriter Fayray's second studio and first self-produced album. The album was released on September 6, 2000.

== Release ==
The single "My Eyes" was released on March 23, 2000 and peaked at #66. It was her first time self-producing a title track.

The next single, "Tears", was released on July 26, 2000 and peaked at #11 in the charts. The song was used as the theme song for the TBS drama "Friends". "Tears" is Fayray's best selling single to date.

== Track listing ==
All tracks are written by Fayray (except M-10, which is a Cole Porter cover).

No.	Title	Length
1.	"Give It Back"	3:49
2.	"No, Never (Album Version)"	4:48
3.	"Sono Ai no Katachi" (その愛のかたち "Pieces of That Love")	4:36
4.	"All I Want, All I Need"	4:31
5.	"If, I"	5:06
6.	"Tears"	4:40
7.	"Mite" (見て "Look")	3:53
8.	"Yakusoku" (約束 "Promise")	5:01
9.	"Shane"	2:45
10.	"My Heart Belongs to Daddy"	4:13
11.	"My Eyes"	3:43
Total length:		47:38

== Charts and sales ==
Chart (2000)	Peak position	Sales
Japan Oricon Weekly Albums Chart	11	65,110

=== Singles ===
"MY EYES" - Oricon Sales Chart (Japan)

Release	Chart	Peak Position	Sales Total	Chart Run
March 23, 2000	Oricon Daily Singles Chart			
March 23, 2000	Oricon Weekly Singles Chart	#66	3,060	1 week
March 23, 2000	Oricon Yearly Singles Chart			

"tears" - Oricon Sales Chart (Japan)

Release	Chart	Peak Position	Sales Total	Chart Run
July 26, 2000	Oricon Daily Singles Chart			
July 26, 2000	Oricon Weekly Singles Chart	#11	259,510	16 weeks
July 26, 2000	Oricon Yearly Singles Chart			
