= Yuzuru Inoue =

Japanese volleyball player (born 1963)

Personal information
- Born: 15 February 1963 (age 63) Hiroshima, Japan
- Height: 1.95 m (6 ft 5 in)

Volleyball information
- Position: Middle blocker
- Number: 10
Honours
Men's volleyball
Representing Japan
Goodwill Games
Bronze medal – third place	1986 Moscow

Yuzuru Inoue (井上 謙, Inoue Yuzuru; born 15 February 1963) is a Japanese former volleyball player. Inoue competed in the men's tournament at the 1988 Summer Olympics in Seoul, where he finished in tenth place. He also competed at the 1986 Goodwill Games in Moscow and won a bronze medal.
