= Shiroi Hana =

Studio album by Fayray
- Released: February 19, 2003
- Recorded: 2001–2003
- Genre: Pop
- Length: 71:35
- Label: Avex Trax
- Producer: Fayray

Fayray chronology
Genuine (2001)	Shiroi Hana (2003)	Hourglass (2004)

Singles from Shiroi Hana
- 1. "Over" Released: October 11, 2001; 2. "Remember" Released: February 20, 2002; 3. "Stay" Released: May 9, 2002; 4. "Touch Me, Kiss Me" Released: October 2, 2002; 5. "Suki da Nante Ienai" Released: January 29, 2003

Shiroi Hana (白い花, "White Flowers") is Japanese singer songwriter Fayray's fourth studio album and sole under the Avex Trax label. The album was released on February 19, 2003. "tears" was used as insert song in the Yomiuri TV/Nippon TV series drama "Message Kotoba ga, Uragitte Iku" The Final Episode.

== Track listing ==
All tracks are written by Fayray

No.	Title	Length
1.	"Sokkyōkyoku Op.1: Shiroi Hana" (即興曲Op.1～しろいはな～ "Impromptu Op.1: White Flowers")	1:57
2.	"Suki da Nante Ienai"	4:40
3.	"Shiroi Hana" (白い花 "White Flowers")	5:09
4.	"Over"	3:56
5.	"Kanashii Jiyū" (悲しい自由 "Bitter Freedom")	5:12
6.	"Baby If,"	4:41
7.	"Betsubetsu no Kaerimichi" (別々の帰り道 "Separate Way Home")	4:46
8.	"Kimi Dake no Merodī" (君だけのメロディー "A Melody Just for You")	4:38
9.	"Stay"	4:35
10.	"Remember"	4:57
11.	"Touch Me, Kiss Me"	4:09
12.	"Tears"	4:40
13.	"Over (Instrumental)"	3:57
14.	"Remember (Instrumental)"	4:57
15.	"Stay (Instrumental)"	4:35
16.	"Touch Me, Kiss Me (Instrumental)"	4:09
Total length:		71:35

== Charts and sales ==
Chart (2003)	Peak position	Sales
Japan Oricon Weekly Albums Chart	6	112,136
