= Kōzō Miyoshi =

Japanese photographer (born 1947)

Kōzō Miyoshi (三好 耕三, Miyoshi Kōzō; born 1947) is a Japanese photographer.
