= Takashi Inoue (author) =

Japanese author and scholar (born 1944)

- 井之上 喬
- Born: November 20, 1944 (age 81); Dalian
- Citizenship: Japan

Takashi Inoue (井之上 喬, Inoue Takashi; born 20 November 1944) is a public relations practitioner, scholar, and theorist. His theories include the "three forces of hyper-globalization", the "Self-Correction Model of Public Relations", and the "Japan model". He was the first to teach public relations courses at a major university in post-war Japan and is the Chairman and CEO of Inoue Public Relations, which he founded in 1970. He is a visiting professor at the Graduate School of Management, Kyoto University and at Kobe Institute of Computing. He was quoted in foreign press reports on the East Japan Earthquake and the 2018 arrest in Japan of Nissan chairman Carlos Ghosn. He has written about modern Japan's lack of PR skills and has described the resulting "Deficiency of Japanese diplomacy", and in 2010 he wrote that corporate Japan's scandals have created "A culture of apologies: Communicating crises in Japan"

== Early life ==
He was born in the Chinese city of Dalian (formerly Dairen, Manshū) at the end of World War II as the sixth child of Rikichi Inoue, who was then the Japanese wartime vice mayor of the city, and Junko Inoue. He first touched Japanese soil before reaching age 2, when the family repatriated after the war. He grew up in Japan as part of the first postwar generation.

== Theories ==
- Self-Correction Model of Public Relations: To consistently achieve goals and to survive a crisis organizations need to establish a process of two-way communications, ethics, continuous self-correction, and recognition of the central role played by human free-will.
- Kizuna Education: "Kizuna", the Japanese word for building relationships between people, is a fundamental skill that helps people live harmoniously in society and to achieve their personal goals through cooperation with others. "Kizuna education" is the concept that it is necessary in today's global society to teach children at very early stages, including preschool, the skill of relationship building in order to foster global peace.
- Public Relations Life-Cycle Model: Structured public relations process aimed at achieving goals quickly and economically through "win-win" outcomes for both the organization and its many stakeholders. The model includes defining PR objectives, setting communication channels, PR strategy, PR program, implementation, analysis, and correction.
- Japan Model: Japan is an "advanced problem solving nation" that can provide social and technological solutions to global challenges.
- Three Forces of Hyper-globalization: Explains globalization in terms of Hyper-globalization as the new environment of the 21st century being shaped by three forces of (1) massive global trade and cross-border economic integration, (2) global and instant communications of the internet, and (3) rapid disruptive technological change through advances in such things as big data, Internet of Things, and Artificial Intelligence that is bringing massive economic and rapid social changes leading to a world of technological singularity.

== Career in public relations ==
Takashi Inoue founded Inoue Public Relations in 1970 as a Japanese PR firm focused on high technology. Between late 1970s and early 1980s he helped both Intel and Apple Inc. enter the Japan market. In 1984 he planned and executed the public relations program for the launch of the Apple Macintosh in Japan. In the late 1990s when Japan's trade surplus created trade friction with the U.S., his firm helped a U.S. auto parts manufacturer achieve deregulation in Japan in the Tenneco case. By bringing about changes in Japan's tax and automotive regulations in the automotive parts market, which had acted as non-tariff trade barriers, IPR helped Tenneco expand sales in Japan and helped avoided U.S. trade sanctions that U.S. President Clinton had threatened. These changes also resulted in Inoue Public Relations winning in 1997 the International Public Relations Association's Golden World Award Grand Prize. IPR also won the 2015 (IPRA) award for successful deregulation public relations campaign for its client Concur Japan, Ltd.

== Career in academia ==
After practicing public relations in Japan for over 30 years, he started a public relations course at Waseda University in 2004, which was the first of its kind at a major Japanese university. In 2009 Takashi Inoue received a Ph.D. from Waseda University, as the first doctoral degree awarded for public relations, and for research for the Self-Correction Model of Public Relations. He has been teaching at the Kyoto University’s Graduate School of Management since 2012.

== Books written, edited, or co-written ==
- Inoue, T. (2003a). "An Overview of Public Relations in Japan and the Self-Correction Concept", In K. Sriramesh, & D. Vercic (Eds.), The global public relations handbook: Theory, research, and practice. (pp. 323–353). New Jersey: Lawrence Erlbaum Associate.
- Paburikku rireshonzu (Public Relations), 1st ed., Tokyo: Nippon Hyroron Sha, 2006
- Paburikku rireshonzu (Public Relations: Relationship Management), 2nd ed., Tokyo: Nippon Hyroron Sha, 2015
- Public Relations in Hyper-globalization: Essential Relationship Management - A Japan Perspective, Takashi Inoue, Routledge, 2018

== Articles and other written works ==
- "Evolution of Public Relations Education and the Influence of Globalisation - survey of eight countries", Takashi Inoue, 1997, IPRA-Gold Paper No. 12
- "The Need for Two-Way Communications and Self-Correction", IPRA, Frontline Takashi Inoue, Ph.D., 2002
- "A culture of apologies: Communicating crises in Japan", MyPRSA-The Public Relations STRATEGIST, May 24, 2010 - By Takashi Inoue, Ph.D., http://apps.prsa.org/Intelligence/TheStrategist/Articles/view/8644/102/A_culture_of_apologies_Communicating_crises_in_Jap#.XHyCx4gzbIU
- "The Japan Model", 2011, IPRA, IPRA Frontline (online), Takashi Inoue, Ph.D., https://www.ipra.org/news/itle/the-japan-model/
- "ITL #263 - A profoundly new environment: the three forces of hyper-globalization", IPRA, April 2018, Takashi Inoue Ph.D., https://www.ipra.org/news/itle/itl-263-a-profoundly-new-environment-the-three-forces-of-hyper-globalization/
- "Hyper-Globalization and the Critical Role of PR", October 2018, O'Dwyer's, By Takashi Inoue Ph.D., https://www.odwyerpr.com/story/public/11458/2018-10-16/hyper-globalization-critical-role-pr.html
