= Touch Me, Kiss Me =

Single by Fayray

from the album Shiroi Hana
- Released: October 2, 2002
- Genre: J-Pop
- Length: 12:51
- Label: Avex Trax
- Songwriter: Fayray
- Producer: Fayray

Fayray singles chronology
"Stay" (2002)	"Touch Me, Kiss Me" (2002)	"Suki da Nante Ienai" (2003)

"Touch Me, Kiss Me" is Fayray's thireenth single. It was released on October 2, 2002 and peaked at #17. The song was used as the theme song for the movie "Ashita ga Aru sa the Movie" as AX Power Play #016 for the Nippon TV program AX Music-TV. "I Do" served as ending theme for the TV Tokyo anime Cyborg 009 and the second coupling is a cover of Carole King's "So Far Away".

== Track listing ==
1. Touch Me, Kiss Me
2. I Do
3. So Far Away

== Charts ==
"Touch Me, Kiss Me" - Oricon Sales Chart (Japan)

Release	Chart	Peak Position	Sales Total	Chart Run
October 2, 2002	Oricon Weekly Singles Chart	17	16,310	4 weeks
