= Hideto Inoue =

Japanese footballer

Personal information
- Full name: Hideto Inoue
- Date of birth: June 27, 1982 (age 44)
- Place of birth: Ehime, Japan
- Height: 1.77 m (5 ft 9 1/2 in)
- Position: Midfielder

Youth career
- 1998–2000: Ehime FC
- 2001–2004: Chukyo University

Senior career*
Years	Team	Apps	(Gls)
2005–2008	Ehime FC	109	(1)
Total		109	(1)
- * Club domestic league appearances and goals

Hideto Inoue (井上 秀人, Inoue Hideto; born June 27, 1982) is a former Japanese football player.

Inoue spent most of his career playing for Ehime FC in the J2 League.

== Career statistics ==
Appearances and goals by club, season and competition
Club	Season	League			Emperor's Cup		Total	
Club	Season	Division	Apps	Goals	Apps	Goals	Apps	Goals
Ehime FC	2005	Football League	26	1	3	0	29	1
Ehime FC	2006	J2 League	45	0	2	0	47	0
Ehime FC	2007	J2 League	29	0	0	0	29	0
Ehime FC	2008	J2 League	9	0	0	0	9	0
Career total			109	1	5	0	114	1
