= Hideto Horiike =

Japanese architect (1949–2015)

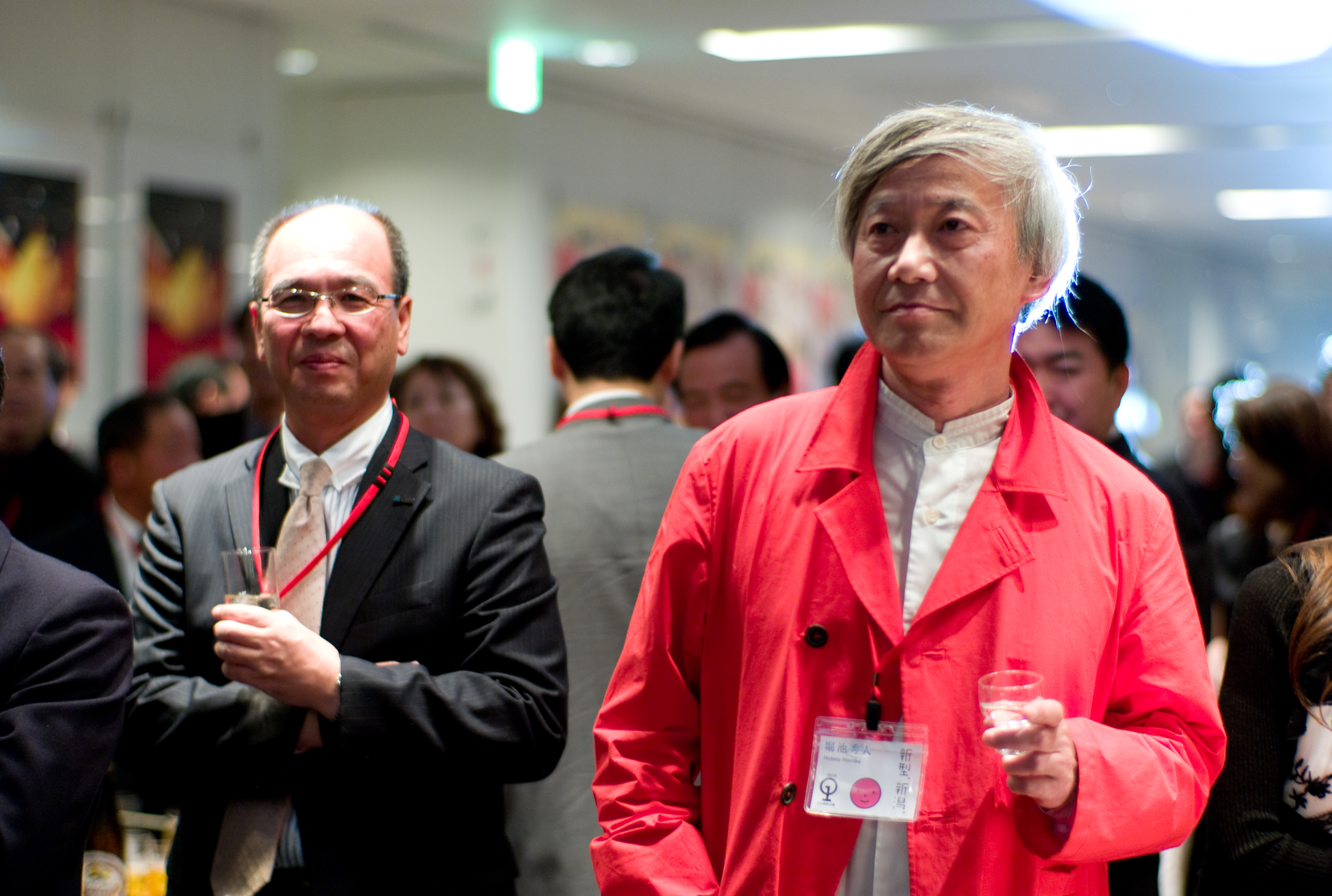
Hideto Horiike

Hideto Horiike (堀池 秀人, 1949 in Nagasaki, Nagasaki – June 2015) was a Japanese architect. He has a Ph.D. from the University of Tokyo. In 1996, he married the announcer Mikiko Minami, and the couple had a child in the following year.
