= Genuine (Fayray album) =

Studio album by Fayray
- Released: July 18, 2001
- Recorded: 2000–2001
- Genre: Pop
- Length: 50:48
- Label: Antinos Records
- Producer: Fayray

Fayray chronology
Ever After (2000)	Genuine (2001)	Shiroi Hana (2003)

Singles from Genuine
- 1. "I'll Save You" Released: March 28, 2001; 2. "Baby If," Released: June 6, 2001

Genuine is Japanese singer songwriter Fayray's third studio album and last under the Antinos Records label. The album was released on July 18, 2001.

== Release ==
The single "I'll save you" was released on March 28, 2001, and peaked at #24. The song was used in a commercial for Kanebo's "KATE" cosmetics line.

"Baby if," was released on June 6, 2001, and peaked at #22. It was used as insert song in the Nippon TV drama "Ashita ga Aru sa" (in which she also starred). The coupling is a cover of Dorothy Fields's "Big Spender".

== Track listing ==
All tracks are written by Fayray, except as noted.

No.	Title	Length
1.	"Walk On"	4:28
2.	"Baby If,"	4:17
3.	"Us"	4:54
4.	"Faith"	5:36
5.	"Sugar"	1:47
6.	"Genuine: J-Girl Suite"	10:14
7.	"I'll Save You"	5:11
8.	"Onaji Hitomi" (同じ瞳 "Same Eyes")	4:20
9.	"Better Days"	5:13
Total length:		46:04

Bonus tracks
No.	Title	Writer(s)	Length
10.	"Rapture"	Debbie Harry; Chris Stein	4:44
Total length:			50:48

== Charts and sales ==
Chart (2001)	Peak position	Sales
Japan Oricon Weekly Albums Chart	9	117,920

=== Singles ===
"I'll save you" - Oricon Sales Chart (Japan)

Release	Chart	Peak Position	Sales Total	Chart Run
March 28, 2001	Oricon Daily Singles Chart			
March 28, 2001	Oricon Weekly Singles Chart	#24	37,830	6 weeks
March 28, 2001	Oricon Yearly Singles Chart			

"Baby if," - Oricon Sales Chart (Japan)

Release	Chart	Peak Position	Sales Total	Chart Run
June 6, 2001	Oricon Daily Singles Chart			
June 6, 2001	Oricon Weekly Singles Chart	#22	65,480	8 weeks
June 6, 2001	Oricon Yearly Singles Chart			
