= Kozo Inoue =

Japanese journalist

- 井上 公造
- Born: December 30, 1956 (age 69); Chūō-ku, Fukuoka, Fukuoka Prefecture, Japan
- Education: Seinan Gakuin University
- Occupation: Reporter
- Height: 1.76 m (5 ft 9 in)
- Spouse: Shiho Inoue (representative director of Kozo Creators)

Kozo Inoue (井上 公造, Inoue Kōzō; born December 30, 1956, in Chūō-ku, Fukuoka, Fukuoka Prefecture, Japan) is a Japanese reporter who is represented by Kozo Creators with his wife.

He graduated from Seinan Gakuin University with a Bachelor of Commerce degree.

== Filmography ==
=== TV series ===
Title	Network	Notes
Tokumori! Yoshimoto Imada Hakkō no Oshaberi Jungle		
Kaminuma Takada no Kugizuke!		
Jōhō Live Miyane-ya	YTV	
Sukkiri!!	NTV	
Ohayō Asahi desu	ABC	Friday
Cast	ABC	Friday
Kyō-kan TV	RKB	Wednesday
Ta Kajin Mune-ippai		
Night Shuffle	FBS	Quasi-regular
Wide na Show	Fuji TV	

==== Past ====
Title	Network	Notes
Wide! ABC	ABC	
Move!	ABC	Friday
Kōzō no ie	ABC	
Kōzō to Anaana	ABC	
O Mezame Wide	CTV	
Semete Konya Dake wa	RKB	
Asa Doki tsu! Kyūshū 5:55	FBS	
Ai no Ryūkeichi		
Nanbo DE Nanbo	KTV	
Pikan TV	THK	
News Yū+	ABC	Friday

=== Radio series ===
Title	Network	Notes
Ore-tachi Yatte ma su	MBS Radio	
Yagorō no Oh! Happy Morning	Radio Kansai	
Motoki Nakamura no Tsūkin	KBC Radio	Thursday
Shibata Sakurai ya su-tomo no Surasura Suiyōbi	ABC Radio	
