= Kozo Ohsone =

Japanese engineer (born 1933)

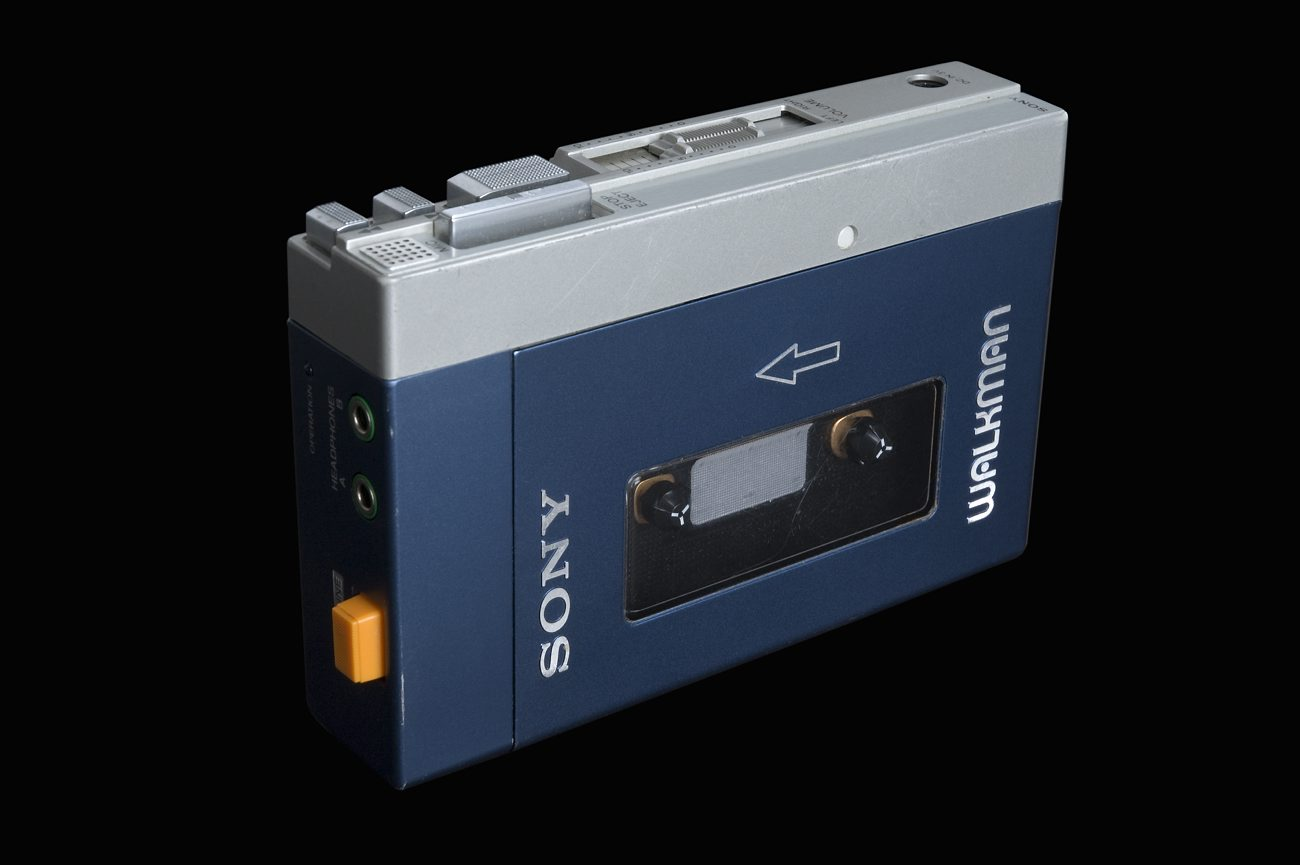
Sonys fist Walkman, modell TPS-L2.

Kozo Ohsone (大曽根 幸三; born 10 November 1933) is a Japanese Sony engineer and manager who was credited as one of the main developers of the Walkman. While general manager of the Tape Recorder Business Division he was asked to help develop a portable audio player. Ohsone and his staff modified the existing Pressman device to create the Walkman, which was released in Japan in 1979.

== Sources ==
- Official Sony history - development of the Walkman
