= Atsuo Inoue =

Japanese writer and translator (born 1947)

Atsuo Inoue (井上 篤夫/いのうえあつお; born July 15, 1947) is a Japanese writer and translator. He is regarded as an expert on cinema and works of Frank Capra. and the author of Aiming High—A Biography of Masayoshi Son.

== Biography ==
Inoue was born in Gifu Prefecture, Japan, during the baby boom that took place after World War II. Many of his classes at Waseda University were cancelled due to student protests.

== Beginning of career as reporter ==
Inoue began writing magazine articles while he was in college and drafted articles for Weekly Playboy magazine, a leading magazine in Japan. Over the course of his career, he lived in the US and interviewed many celebrities, including George Harrison, Jeffrey Archer, Brooke Shields, Muhammad Ali, Irving Wallace and Jack Carter, the son of President Jimmy Carter. His articles were published for the Weekly Playboy. In 1987, he published Winners of Young American Entrepreneurs, which is based on interviews with Bill Gates of Microsoft and Ted Turner, a founder of CNN.

== Series of publishing ==
Upon returning to Japan, Inoue translated and published books of poetry written by Nancy Woods, Dancing Moons and Shaman's Circle. Inoue interviewed friends and family of Marilyn Monroe to publish Recollection of Marilyn Monroe which tells the life story of the world-famous actress. In 2004, Inoue published the best seller Aiming High – A Biography of Masayoshi Son, to tell the story of the SoftBank Corporation founder. Inoue has also translated a great number of literary works and biographies.

== Recognition ==
- Wired – The Short Life and Fast Times of John Belushi by Bob Woodward, 1985 (Japanese translation)
- Winners of Young American Entrepreneurs by KK Bestsellers 1987
- There Is the Friendship in Boston by Kawade Shobo 1990
- Recollection Marilyn Monroe by Shueisha Bunko 1998
- Shaman's Circle by Nancy Woods 1998 (translation)
- What Dogs Teach Us – Life's Lessons Learned from Our Best Friends by Glenn Dromgoole 2003 (translation)
- English Bouquet by Jitsugyo no Nihon Sha 2004
- Ultimate Marilyn Monroe by SoftBank Creative 2006
- American Origin – Going Boston to Learn Future of Japan by SoftBank Creative 2007
- Dancing Moons by Nancy Woods 2007 (Japanese translation)
- Political Sex Appeal – U.S. president and Hollywood by Shincho Bunko 2008
- Michelle Obama – An American Story by David Colbert 2009 (Japanese translation)
- Making it Happen: the New 30 Year Vision of Masayoshi Son, published by Jitsugyo no Nihon Sha, 2010
- How Wonderful, Frank Capra published by Shueisha Bunko 2011
- Fragments: Poems, Intimate Notes, Letters of Marilyn Monroe, published by Seigensha Art Publishing, 2012 (Japanese translation)
- Aiming High - A Biography of Masayoshi Son (iBooks Edition) published by YouTeacher, 2013.
- My Marilyn Monroe, released by Kindle Singles 2016
