= Akio Inoue =

Japanese musician

Akio Inoue (井上秋緒, Inoue Akio) is a female Japanese lyricist from Kanagawa Prefecture. Inoue writes the majority of songs recorded by T.M.Revolution, Takanori Nishikawa’s solo project, as well as for other artists produced by Daisuke Asakura.
