= Fayray =

Japanese singer (born 1976)

- Birth name: Minako Ōhashi 大橋 美奈子 (Ōhashi Minako)
- Born: April 18, 1976 (age 49)
- Origin: Tokyo, Japan
- Genres: Pop, rock, dance
- Occupation(s): Singer, songwriter
- Instrument(s): Vocals, piano
- Years active: 1998–present
- Labels: Antinos Records (1998–2001); Avex Trax (2001–2003); R and C (2004–present)
- Website: www.fayray.net

Fayray (フェイレイ, Feirei), (born April 18, 1976) stylized as FAYRAY, is a Japanese singer-songwriter. She made her debut in July 1998 with the single "Taiyō no Gravity". She grew up in the United States and speaks English.

== Biography ==
Fayray is the middle child of a family of three daughters. During her childhood, she listened to American music from the 70s and 80s with her parents which had a big influence on her musical style. At age 4 she began playing classical piano.

Fayray landed a recording contract with the now-defunct Antinos Records label.

After one album, Craving, Fayray opted to take full creative control over her music and began writing and composing her own music. She wrote the two b-sides of her fifth single, "Same Night, Same Face" before self-producing her next single, "My Eyes", and all of her subsequent records.

In 2006, she traveled to New York City in search of new ideas to create her ideal music. There she met avant-garde producer Dougie Bowne and produced two albums with him.

In 2007 the singer resumed performance under the name Mina Ohashi, performing as part of the trio The Present with Rusty Santos. The Present's debut album as a duo, FSG, was released May 12, 2015.

== Discography ==
- Craving (1999)
- Ever After (2000)
- Genuine (2001)
- Shiroi Hana (2003)
- Hourglass (2004)
- Covers (2005)
- Hikari to Kage (2006)
- Nete mo Samete mo (2009)

== Filmography ==
- 2000: Nisennen no Koi — Naomi Nagin
