= Dubbing =

Post-production process used in filmmaking and video production

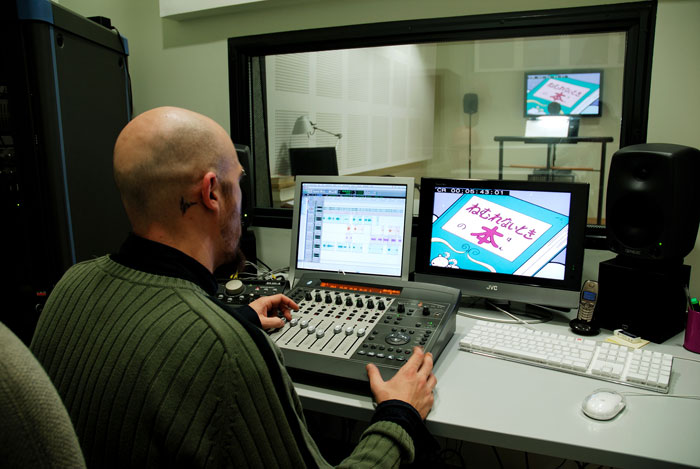
Dubbing studio

Dubbing is the process of adding to or replacing the recorded audio of a film or video during post-production. Dubbing commonly refers more narrowly to the process of replacing dialog, especially with a translation synchronized to the film's visuals.

Dubbing is also used to replace unclear dialogue, change lines, or add dialogue from characters off screen. When this is the case, it may be referred to as automated dialogue replacement or sometimes additional dialogue replacement (ADR).

== History ==
In many countries, dubbing was adopted at least in part for political reasons. In authoritarian states such as Fascist Italy and Francoist Spain, dubbing could be used to enforce particular ideological agendas, excising negative references to the nation and its leaders and promoting standardized national languages at the expense of local dialects and minority languages. In post-Nazi Germany, dubbing was used to downplay events in the country's recent past, as in the case of the dub of Alfred Hitchcock's Notorious, where the Nazi organization upon which the film's plot centers was changed to a drug smuggling enterprise. The first post-WWII movie dub was Konstantin Zaslonov (1949) dubbed from Russian into the Czech language.

In Western Europe after World War II, dubbing was attractive to many film producers as it helped to enable co-production between companies in different countries, in turn allowing them to pool resources and benefit from financial support from multiple governments. The use of dubbing meant that multi-national casts could be assembled and were able to use their preferred language for their performances, with appropriate post-production dubs being carried out before distributing versions of the film.

== Methods ==
=== ADR ===
Example of ADR for the Telugu-language film Uppena. Here, P. Ravi Shankar dubs over the original performance of Vijay Sethupathi.

Automated dialogue replacement (ADR) is the process of re-recording dialogue by the original actor (or a replacement actor) in a sound booth after the filming process to improve audio quality (for example, if the microphones from on-set picked up ambient noise such as strong wind or passing traffic) or make changes to the initially scripted dialog.

In the early days of talkies, a loop of film would be cut and spliced together for each of the scenes that needed to be re-recorded, and then the loops would be loaded onto a projector one by one. For each scene, the loop would be played repeatedly while the voice actor performed the lines, trying to synchronize them to the filmed performance. This was known as "looping" or a "looping session". Loading and reloading the film loops while the talent and recording crew stood by was tedious. Later, videotape and then digital technology replaced the film loops, and the process became known as automated dialogue replacement (ADR).

In conventional film production, a production sound mixer records dialogue during filming. During post-production, a supervising sound editor, or ADR supervisor, reviews all of the dialogue in the film and decides which lines must be re-recorded. ADR is recorded during an ADR session, which takes place in a specialized sound studio. Multiple takes are recorded, and the most suitable take becomes the final version, or portions of various takes may be edited together.

As of 2020, the process includes various automated techniques, such as automatically displaying lines on-screen for the talent, automated cues, shifting the audio track for accurate synchronization, and time-fitting algorithms for stretching or compressing portions of a spoken line. There is software that can sort out spoken words from ambient sounds in the original filmed soundtrack, detect the peaks of the dialog, and automatically time-fit the new dubbed performance to the original to create accurate synchronization.

=== Artificial intelligence ===
In recent years speech synthesis programs and artificial intelligence have been used to artificially automatically dub content. In September 2025 YouTube officially launched an optional multi-language audio-dubbing feature following a two-year-long pilot program. Amazon Prime Video has tested AI-generated dubs in March 2025 and has released AI-dub versions of content such as English dubs of the Banana Fish anime and the Portuguese language show O Silêncio de Marcos Tremmer, though they have been criticized for their overall quality and potential job impact on voice actors. Development of the technology to be able to auto-dub live events has also taken place, though auto-dubs for live events are not currently widely in use.

A related but distinct approach, known as visual dubbing, uses machine learning to modify an actor's on-screen lip and facial movements in post-production to match dubbed target-language audio, rather than replacing the performer's voice. Early models such as Wav2Lip (2020) demonstrated that accurate lip synchronisation could be generated from arbitrary audio and video inputs across any speaker identity or language. The 2023 SAG-AFTRA TV/Theatrical contract permits adjusting lip and facial movements to match a foreign language as part of standard dubbing practices, without requiring additional performer consent, provided human voice actors perform the dubbed audio.

== Global use ==
=== Localization ===
Localization is the practice of adapting a film or television series from one region of the world for another. In contrast to pure translation, localization encompasses adapting the content to suit the target audience. For example, culture-specific references may be replaced, and footage may be removed or added.

The new voice track is usually spoken by a voice actor (VA). In many countries, actors who regularly perform this duty remain little-known, with the exception of particular circles (such as Seiyuu the anime fandom) or when their voices have become synonymous with roles or actors whose voices they usually dub. In the United States, many of these voice artists may employ pseudonyms or go uncredited due to Screen Actors Guild (SAG) regulations or the desire to dissociate themselves from the role.

==== Dialogue writing ====
The dialogue writer's role is to make the translation sound natural in the target language, and to make the translation sound like a credible dialogue instead of merely a translated text.

=== Africa ===
==== North Africa, Western Asia ====
In Algeria, Morocco, and Tunisia, most foreign movies (especially Hollywood productions) are shown dubbed in French. These movies are usually imported directly from French film distributors. The choice of movies dubbed into French can be explained by the widespread use of the French language. Another important factor is that local theaters and private media companies do not dub in local languages in order to avoid high costs, but also because of the lack of both expertise and demand.

Beginning in the 1980s, dubbed series and movies for children in Modern Standard Arabic (MSA) became a popular choice among most TV channels, cinemas and VHS/DVD stores. However, dubbed films are still imported, and dubbing is still performed in the Levant countries with a strong tradition of dubbing (mainly Syria and Jordan). Egypt was the first Arab country in charge of dubbing Disney movies in 1975 and used to do it exclusively in Egyptian Arabic rather than Modern Standard Arabic (MSA) until 2011, and since then many other companies started dubbing their productions in this dialect. Beginning with Encanto, Disney movies are now dubbed in both dialects.

In the Arabic-speaking countries, children's shows (mainly cartoons and kids sitcoms) are dubbed in Arabic, or Arabic subtitles are used. The only exception was telenovelas dubbed in Modern Standard Arabic (MSA), or dialects, but also Turkish series, most notably Gümüş, in Syrian Arabic.

==== South Africa ====
In South Africa, many television programs were dubbed in Afrikaans, with the original soundtrack (usually in English, but sometimes Dutch or German) "simulcast" in FM stereo on Radio 2000. These included US series such as The Six Million Dollar Man (Steve Austin: Die Man van Staal), Miami Vice (Misdaad in Miami), Beverly Hills 90210, and the German detective series Derrick.

As a result of the boycott by the British actors' union Equity, which banned the sale of most British television programs, the puppet series The Adventures of Rupert Bear was dubbed into South African English, as the original voices had been recorded by Equity voice artists.

This practice has declined as a result of the reduction of airtime for the language on SABC TV, and the increase of locally produced material in Afrikaans on other channels like KykNet. Similarly, many programs, such as The Jeffersons, were dubbed into Zulu, but this has also declined as local drama production has increased. However, some animated films, such as Maya the Bee, have been dubbed in both Afrikaans and Zulu by local artists. In 2018, eExtra began showing the Turkish drama series Paramparça dubbed in Afrikaans as Gebroke Harte or "Broken Hearts", the first foreign drama to be dubbed in the language for twenty years.

==== Angola and Mozambique ====
In Portuguese-speaking countries in Africa, mainly Angola and Mozambique, the satellite TV channel Zap Novelas screens dramas from various countries, including Mexico and Turkey, dubbed in Portuguese by studios in Brazil.

==== Uganda ====
Uganda's own film industry is fairly small, and foreign movies are commonly watched. The English soundtrack is often accompanied by the Luganda translation and comments, provided by a Ugandan "video jockey" (VJ). VJ's interpreting and narration may be available in a recorded form or live.

=== Asia ===
==== Iran ====
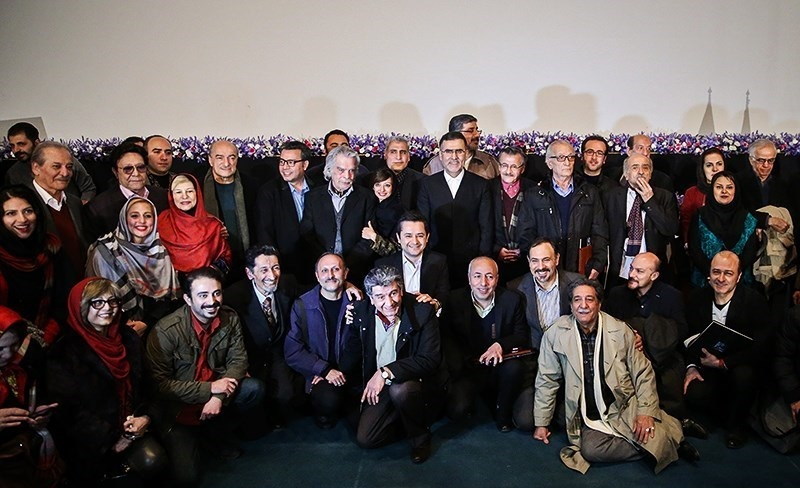
A group of Iranian dubbing artists

In Iran, foreign films and television programs are dubbed into Persian. Dubbing in Iran began in 1946, alongside the development of cinema in the country. That year, through the efforts of Dr. Esmail Koushan, the French film The Runaway Girl was dubbed and screened for audiences at Cinema Crystal. The dubbing was carried out in Turkey. Before the release of this film, films had been screened in their original languages, sometimes with Persian intertitles. The first four films dubbed into Persian—The Runaway Girl, Gypsy Girl, Cruel Woman, and Taras Bulba—were not of good quality. However, the fifth film, Return of Youth, which was dubbed into Persian in Paris, is considered the first high-quality Persian-dubbed film.

Gradually, foreign films were dubbed for theatrical release. The use of different voice actors and the addition of local jokes and cultural references to the original content played an important role in attracting audiences to cinemas and encouraging interest in other cultures. Dubbing in Iran reached its peak during the 1960s and 1970s, alongside the widespread arrival of American, European, and Indian films. This period is known as the Golden Age of Dubbing.

Some of the most famous musicals of that era, such as My Fair Lady and The Sound of Music (known in Iran as Tears and Smiles), were translated, adapted, and performed in Persian by dubbing artists.

From the late 1970s onward, the dubbing industry entered a period of decline. According to the same source, the main reasons for this decline included excessively fast production schedules, disregard for quality, low wages for dubbing artists, and a lack of legal protections, including insurance and retirement benefits.

Following the 1979 Revolution, the dubbing industry declined for political reasons, and films were dubbed primarily for state television channels. In subsequent years, Video CDs with Persian subtitles became popular among viewers, although most people continued to prefer dubbed versions. Some Persian-language television channels based outside Iran also began dubbing films, but these versions were generally unauthorized and often considered to be of relatively low quality.

Alongside official dubbing produced by the Islamic Republic of Iran Broadcasting (IRIB) or authorized institutions, unofficial or underground dubbing studios also emerged. These productions, often characterized by lower quality and a lack of adherence to professional standards, were a response to market demand for faster access to international films without censorship.

The emergence of video-on-demand (VOD) services, including Filimo and Namava, during the 2010s led private studios to begin dubbing films and television series.

Some Iranian dubbing artists and their associated actors are listed below:

A list of Persian voice actors that associate with their actor counterparts are listed here.

Persian dubbing artists	Actor(s)/Actress(es)	Notes
Manouchehr Esmaeili	Peter Falk Buddy Hackett Sidney Poitier Rod Steiger Peter Sellers	Dubbed for Paul Scofield as Thomas More in A Man for All Seasons (1966 film).
Zhaleh Kazemi	Sophia Loren Elizabeth Taylor Ingrid Bergman Vivien Leigh Eva Gardner	Dubbed for Julie Andrews as Maria von Trapp in The Sound of Music (film).
Changiz Jalilvand	Peter O'Toole Robert De Niro Paul Newman Burt Lancaster Richard Burton	Dubbed for Marlon Brando as Emiliano Zapata in Viva Zapata!.
Amir Houshang Zand	James Franco Matthew Perry Simon Pegg Tom Hiddleston Orlando Bloom James McAvoy	
Saeed Mozaffari	Brad Pitt Jackie Chan Michael Keaton Kevin Bacon Christopher Walken Willem Dafoe	
Iraj Nazerian	Orson Welles Marlon Brando Lino Ventura Gene Hackman Charles Bronson Sylvester Stallone Rock Hudson	Dubbed for Welles as Charles Foster Kane in Citizen Kane and dubbed for Brando as Vito Corleone in The Godfather.
Bahram Zand	Robert De Niro Mel Gibson Russell Crowe Jeremy Brett Roger Hanin	
Jalal Maghami	James Cagney Robert Redford Omar Sharif	
Khosro Khosroshahi	Alain Delon Dustin Hoffman Al Pacino	
Shervin Ghetei	Johnny Depp Tobey Maguire Mark Wahlberg Ryan Reynolds Martin Freeman	
Manouchehr valizadeh	Tom Cruise Will Smith Jamie Foxx Eddie Murphy Adam Sandler	
George Petrossi	Chris Hemsworth Nicolas Cage Jim Carrey Denzel Washington Kurt Russell	
Afshin Zinoori	Elijah Wood Daniel Radcliffe Leonardo DiCaprio Matt Damon	Dubbed for Wood as Frodo Baggins in The Lord of the Rings and dubbed for Radcliffe as Harry Potter in the titular film series from 3 to 5.

==== Azerbaijan ====
Before 2006, most foreign movies and TV shows in Azerbaijan were shown in Russian dubbing, especially in cinemas and on TV channels. However, AzTV usually aired foreign content with full Azerbaijani dubbing.

In 2006, a law was introduced requiring all foreign content on TV channels to be dubbed or voice-overed in Azerbaijani. Following this, most channels switched to Azerbaijani voice-over to follow the new rules.

In 2011, a similar law was passed for cinemas. But it didn't have much effect due to the local dubbing industry not being well developed yet.

In 2017, the local streaming platform TVSeans began streaming movies and shows with full Azerbaijani dubbing, mainly done by Balans Studio. While full dubs became more common on TV and streaming, home media releases with full dubs remained limited.

==== China ====
China has a long tradition of dubbing foreign films into Mandarin Chinese, starting in the 1930s. While during the Republic of China (ROC) era Western motion pictures may have been imported and dubbed into Chinese, since 1950 Soviet movies became the main import, sometimes even surpassing the local production. In Communist China, most European movies were dubbed in Shanghai, whereas Asian and Soviet films were usually dubbed in Changchun. During the Cultural Revolution, North Korean, Romanian and Albanian films became popular. Beginning in the late 1970s, in addition to films, popular TV series from the United States, Japan, Brazil, and Mexico were also dubbed.

Motion pictures are also dubbed into the languages of some of China's autonomous regions. Notably, the Translation Department of the Tibetan Autonomous Region Movie Company (西藏自治区电影公司译制科) has been dubbing movies into the Tibetan language since the 1960s. In the early decades, it would dub 25 to 30 movies each year, the number rising to 60–75 by the early 2010s. Motion pictures are dubbed for China's Mongol- and Uyghur-speaking markets as well.

Chinese television dramas are often dubbed in Standard Mandarin by professional voice actors to remove accents, improve poor performances, or change lines to comply with local censorship laws.

==== Japan ====
Japanese dub-over artists provide the voices for certain performers, such as those listed in the following table:

Japanese dubbing artists	Actor(s)/Actress(es)	Notes
Hiroya Ishimaru	Jackie Chan	Officially approved by Chan.
Tesshō Genda	Arnold Schwarzenegger	Officially approved by Schwarzenegger.
Isao Sasaki	Sylvester Stallone Elvis Presley David Hasselhoff	
Masashi Ebara	Tom Hanks Bill Murray Wesley Snipes Robin Williams	
Kōichi Yamadera	Jim Carrey Will Smith Jean-Claude Van Damme Eddie Murphy	Officially approved by Shrek producer Jeffrey Katzenberg (for whom Murphy provides the voice of Donkey) and Smith.
Kenyu Horiuchi	Brad Pitt Charlie Sheen Ben Stiller John Stamos	Officially approved by Pitt.
Takeshi Kusao	Leonardo DiCaprio	Dubbed throughout his 1990s films.
Daisuke Namikawa	Elijah Wood Hayden Christensen Leonardo DiCaprio	Officially approved by Christensen.
Yūya Uchida	Leonardo DiCaprio Ryan Gosling	
Rikiya Koyama	George Clooney Kiefer Sutherland	Officially approved by Sutherland.
Kunio Murai	Harrison Ford	Officially approved by Ford.
Tsutomu Isobe	Harrison Ford Mel Gibson Chow Yun-fat	
Kazuhiro Yamaji	Russell Crowe Hugh Jackman Jason Statham Sean Penn	
Hiroe Oka	Kate Winslet Charlize Theron Kirsten Dunst	
Marika Hayashi	Kate Winslet	
Masane Tsukayama	Kevin Costner Liam Neeson Ed Harris Robert De Niro	
Akio Ōtsuka	Nicolas Cage Steven Seagal Denzel Washington Dolph Lundgren	
Masato Sako	Gary Oldman	
Mayumi Sako	Rachel McAdams Scarlett Johansson	
Shinpachi Tsuji	Gary Oldman Colm Meaney	
Hōchū Ōtsuka	Jean-Claude Van Damme Jeff Goldblum Donnie Yen Gary Oldman	Dubbed for Oldman in a few films and later dubs of his earlier films.
Jūrōta Kosugi	Billy Blanks David Duchovny Luke Perry Daniel Craig	
Hiroaki Hirata	Johnny Depp Matt Damon Noah Wyle Matt LeBlanc	Officially approved by Depp.
Keiji Fujiwara	Robert Downey Jr.	
Toshiyuki Morikawa	Tom Cruise Ewan McGregor Adam Sandler Keanu Reeves	Officially approved by Cruise and McGregor.
Masako Ikeda	Audrey Hepburn	
Noriko Ohara	Jane Fonda Brigitte Bardot	
Reiko Mutō	Elizabeth Taylor	
Gorō Naya	Charlton Heston Clark Gable Lee Van Cleef	Officially approved by Heston.
Kiyoshi Kobayashi	James Coburn Lee Marvin	
Yasuo Yamada	Clint Eastwood Jean-Paul Belmondo	Officially approved by Eastwood.
Chikao Ōtsuka	Charles Bronson Richard Widmark	
Kenji Utsumi	Oliver Reed Steve McQueen	
Genzō Wakayama	Sean Connery Gene Barry Peter Graves Raymond Burr	
Osamu Kobayashi	Yul Brynner	
Masato Yamanouchi	Montgomery Clift Tyrone Power	
Akiji Kobayashi	John Wayne	
Iemasa Kayumi	Frank Sinatra Donald Sutherland Christopher Lee	
Michio Hazama	Roy Scheider Steve Martin Dean Martin Sylvester Stallone	
Nachi Nozawa	Alain Delon Al Pacino Giuliano Gemma Bruce Willis	
Kei Tomiyama	Rick Moranis	
Tadashi Nakamura	Leslie Nielsen	
Hirotaka Suzuoki	Tom Cruise John Travolta	Dubbed throughout his 1990s films.
Yurika Hino	Ingrid Bergman Winona Ryder Kate Winslet Julianne Moore	
Kotono Mitsuishi	Ellen Pompeo	
Chie Nakamura	Kirsten Dunst	
Yūko Nagashima	Sarah Jessica Parker	
Atomu Shimojō	Eddie Murphy	
Shūichi Ikeda	Jet Li	
Tōru Furuya	Yuen Biao	
Ryōtarō Okiayu	Scott Foley Taylor Kitsch Stephen Fung Lin Gengxin	
Yū Mizushima	Sammo Hung Mark Hamill	
Takayuki Sugō	Jean Reno Tommy Lee Jones Ed Harris	
Rica Matsumoto	Sandra Bullock Renée Zellweger	
Yoshito Yasuhara	Mickey Rourke Kevin Bacon Gary Oldman	
Maaya Sakamoto	Natalie Portman	
Takako Honda	Milla Jovovich Hilary Swank Halle Berry	Officially approved by Jovovich.
Kinryū Arimoto	Christopher Walken	
Takanobu Hozumi	Christopher Lloyd	
Takeshi Aono	Christopher Lloyd Joe Pesci	
Taichirō Hirokawa	Roger Moore Tony Curtis Michael Hui Robert Redford	
Hideyuki Tanaka	Pierce Brosnan Michael Biehn	
Yoshisada Sakaguchi	Morgan Freeman	
Masaru Ikeda	Danny Glover Morgan Freeman	
Masahito Kawanago	Justin Long	
Mika Doi	Julia Roberts	
Wataru Takagi	Jack Black	
Taiten Kusunoki	Dwayne Johnson	
Daisuke Ono	Benjamin McKenzie	
Shunsuke Sakuya	Patrick Wilson Ben Affleck	
Satoshi Mikami	Benedict Cumberbatch	
Daisuke Hirakawa	Orlando Bloom	
Yuhko Kaida	Anne Hathaway	
Mie Sonozaki	Anne Hathaway Kirsten Dunst	
Shinobu Adachi	Jennifer Aniston	
Kōsei Hirota	Danny Trejo	
Hiroshi Yanaka	John Cusack	
Koichi Chiba	Christopher Lee	
Tetsuo Kanao	Will Patton	
Norihiro Inoue	Anthony Edwards	
Kazue Komiya	Bette Midler	
Toshiko Sawada	Anjelica Huston	
Toshiko Fujita	Glenn Close	
Shigeru Ushiyama	William Fichtner	
Megumi Han	Chloë Grace Moretz	
Shin-ichiro Miki	Daniel Wu	
Kazuo Kumakura	Alfred Hitchcock	
Naoya Uchida	Bruce Willis Woody Harrelson	
Keiko Toda	Jodie Foster	
Gara Takashima	Demi Moore Andie MacDowell Amy Yasbeck Emma Thompson	
Mami Koyama	Sharon Stone	
Yūko Sasaki	Robin Wright	
Atsuko Tanaka	Nicole Kidman Monica Bellucci Kate Beckinsale	
Rica Fukami	Catherine Zeta-Jones	
Misa Watanabe	Cameron Diaz	
Yutaka Aoyama	Steve Buscemi	
Banjō Ginga	Michael Clarke Duncan	
Daisuke Gōri	Michael Clarke Duncan	
Naomi Kusumi	John Goodman	
Bin Shimada	Mark Hamill Steve Carell	
Haruhiko Jō	Geoffrey Rush	
Junpei Morita	Hugh Grant Matthew McConaughey Colin Firth	
Katsuhisa Hōki	Ving Rhames	
Hiroshi Iwasaki	Stanley Tucci	
Kinya Aikawa	Jack Lemmon	
Taro Ishida	Gene Hackman	
Ryoko Shiraishi	Miley Cyrus	
Takashi Taniguchi	Tommy Lee Jones	
Kazuko Yanaga	Sigourney Weaver	
Hiroshi Tsuchida	Joseph Gordon-Levitt	
Takaya Hashi	Alan Rickman	
Yoshimasa Hosoya	Taylor Lautner	
Ben Hiura	Bruce Willis John Malkovich Richard Dreyfuss	
Yūji Mitsuya	Michael J. Fox	
Yū Hayashi	Shia LaBeouf	
Fuminori Komatsu	Shia LaBeouf	
Kenshō Ono	Daniel Radcliffe	
Yumi Sudō	Hilary Duff Hayden Panettiere Emma Watson	
Yūki Tokiwa	Rupert Grint Daryl Sabara	
Shūhei Sakaguchi	Chris Pine Lee Byung-hun	
Kazuya Takahashi	Lee Byung-hun	
Akira Ishida	Lee Joon-gi	
Mitsuaki Madono	Kwon Sang-woo	
Masato Hagiwara	Bae Yong-joon	
Yumi Tōma	Kim Ha-neul	
Hiroki Tōchi	Will Smith Sam Worthington Wentworth Miller	
Hisao Egawa	Dominic Purcell	
Mitsuru Miyamoto	Keanu Reeves Ethan Hawke Adrien Brody	
Atsuko Yuya	Angelina Jolie	
Yasuyoshi Hara	Kurt Russell	
Unshō Ishizuka	Liam Neeson	
Shinji Ogawa	Michael Douglas Dustin Hoffman Timothy Dalton	
Takuya Kirimoto	Bradley Cooper	
Mugihito	Patrick Stewart	
Fumihiko Tachiki	Forest Whitaker Michael Rooker	
Masakazu Morita	Zac Efron	
Hiroshi Arikawa	Ian McKellen	
Kōsei Tomita	Ernest Borgnine	
Shūichirō Moriyama	Telly Savalas	
Akira Kume	Humphrey Bogart	
Katsunosuke Hori	William Hurt	
Hiroko Suzuki	Jacqueline Bisset	
Manabu Ino	Tobey Maguire	
Tamio Ōki	Christopher Plummer	
Yasuyuki Kase	Paul Bettany Ryan Reynolds	
Yuzuru Fujimoto	James Earl Jones	
Saori Yumiba	Keira Knightley	
Minoru Uchida	Henry Fonda	
Munenori Oyamada	Henry Fonda	
Tomoko Shiota	Cate Blanchett	
Mabuki Andō	Jennifer Garner	
Asao Koike	Peter Falk	
Ryō Kurosawa	Gary Cooper	
Yōsuke Kondō	William Holden	
Hōsei Komatsu	Anthony Quinn	
Nobuo Kawai	Paul Newman	
Akio Miyabe	Steve McQueen	
Akira Kimura	Glenn Ford	
Kōji Nakata	Jeffrey Hunter	
Ushio Shima	Karl Malden	
Kei Taguchi	Richard Burton	
Hikaru Urano	James Stewart	
Nobuo Tanaka	Sidney Poitier	
Shinsuke Chikaishi	Jerry Lewis	
Takao Inoue	Rock Hudson	
Aiko Konoshima	Sophia Loren	
Reiko Tajima	Kathleen Turner	
Ranko Mizuki	Ingrid Bergman	
Tatsuya Jō	Gregory Peck	
Michiko Ōtsuka	Lauren Bacall	
Hiroko Ushida	Bridgit Mendler	
Tadashi Mutō	Jesse Eisenberg	
Junya Enoki	Tom Holland	Spider-Man (Marvel Cinematic Universe)

==== Malaysia ====
Foreign-language programmes and films that air on TV2 and TVS are subtitled.

==== Pakistan ====
In Pakistan "foreign films", and series are not normally dubbed locally. Instead, foreign films, anime and cartoons, such as those shown on Nickelodeon Pakistan and Cartoon Network Pakistan, are dubbed in Hindi in India, as Hindi and Urdu, the national language of Pakistan, are mutually intelligible. However, soap operas from Turkey are now dubbed in Urdu and have gained increased popularity at the expense of Indian soap operas in Hindi. This has led to protests from local producers that these are a threat to Pakistan's television industry, with local productions being moved out of peak viewing time or dropped altogether. Similarly, politicians and leaders have expressed concerns over their content, given Turkey's less conservative culture.

==== Singapore ====
In multilingual Singapore, dubbing is rare for western programs. English-language programs on the free-to-air terrestrial channels are usually subtitled in Chinese or Malay. Chinese, Malay and Tamil programs (except for news bulletins and other live shows), usually have subtitles in English and the original language during the prime time hours. Dual sound programs, such as Korean, Japanese and Filipino dramas, exist.

==== Thailand ====
In Thailand, foreign television programs are dubbed in Thai, but the original soundtrack is often simultaneously carried on a NICAM audio track on terrestrial broadcast, and alternate audio tracks on satellite broadcast. Previously, terrestrial stations simulcasted the original soundtrack on the radio.

==== Vietnam ====
In Vietnam, foreign-language films and programs are often subtitled or voice-overed on television in Vietnamese. They were not dubbed until 1985. Rio was considered to be the very first American Hollywood film to be entirely dubbed in Vietnamese. Since then, children's films that came out afterwards have been released dubbed in theaters. HTV3 has dubbed television programs for children, including Ben 10, and Ned's Declassified School Survival Guide, by using various voice actors to dub over the character roles.

=== Europe ===
Countries using dubs only for children's media, and subtitles otherwise. Mixed areas: Countries primarily using subtitles but occasionally full-cast dubs instead. Voice-over: Countries using usually one or just a couple of voice actors while the original soundtrack persists. General dubbing: Countries using full-cast dubs. Belgium: The Dutch-speaking region primarily uses subtitles, but sometimes imports dubs from the Netherlands or produces their own dialect dubs for children's films. The French-speaking region uses full-cast dubs for all films. Slovakia and Belarus: Countries with a separate official language that occasionally produce their own dubs, but generally use dubs from other countries, since their languages share a high degree of mutual intelligibility.

==== Children's/family films and programming ====
In North-West Europe, Poland, Portugal, Balkan, Baltic and Nordic countries, generally only movies and TV shows that are intended for children are dubbed, while TV shows and movies that are intended for teenagers or adults are subtitled, although adult-animated productions (e.g. South Park and The Simpsons) have a tradition of being dubbed. For movies in cinemas with clear target audiences (both below and above 10–11 years of age), both a dubbed and a subtitled version are usually available.

==== Croatia ====
On 1 October 2008, Nova TV launched its sister channel Mini TV, the first Croatian television channel for children with programming entirely dubbed into Croatian. RTL followed suit with the launch of RTL Kockica in 2014.

Since the 2010s, the dubbing of live-action television series and films aimed at children, teenagers and young adults has been on the rise. With the launch of Nickelodeon's Croatian audio track in 2011, Studio NET was the first in Croatia to focus on "serious production of live-action dubbing," with most of Nickelodeon's major teen live-action titles such as iCarly (2007–2012), Sam & Cat (2013–2014), The Thundermans (2013–2018) and Victorious (2010–2013) receiving a Croatian dub. With the rise of streaming television in the 2020s, NET and various other studios also began producing Croatian dubs for Netflix; although the focus is still on dubbing animated series and films, a notable amount of live-action programming aimed at younger audiences has also been dubbed for Netflix, such as Chupa (2023), Geek Girl (2024), Heartstopper (2022–2024), I Woke Up a Vampire (2023), Matilda the Musical (2022) and Spy Kids: Armageddon (2023).

==== Portugal ====
In Portugal, dubbing was banned under a 1948 law as a way of protecting the domestic film industry while also aiding in Salazarist censorship efforts, as most of the population was illiterate and would therefore not understand the subtitles on foreign cultural imports. While this law was largely undone by the transition to democracy in the mid-1970s, the status quo continued for many years afterwards and animated movies, as well as other TV series for children, were shown subtitled in Portugal (along with imported Brazilian Portuguese dubs) due to the lack of interest from Portuguese companies in the dubbing industry. This lack of interest was justified, since there were already quality dubbed copies of shows and movies in Portuguese made by Brazilians. In 1994, The Lion King became the first feature film to be dubbed in European Portuguese. Currently, all movies for children are dubbed. Subtitles are preferred in Portugal, used in every foreign-language documentary, TV series and film. The exception to this preference is when children are the target audience.

==== Romania ====
In Romania, virtually all programs intended for children are dubbed in Romanian. Animated movies are shown in theaters with Romanian dubbing. However, cinemas with more screening rooms usually also provide the original subtitled version. Other foreign TV shows and movies are shown in the original language with Romanian subtitles. Subtitles are usually preferred in the Romanian market. According to "Special Eurobarometer 243" (graph QA11.8) of the European Commission (research carried out in November and December 2005), 62% of Romanians prefer to watch foreign films and programs with subtitles (rather than dubbed), 22% prefer dubbing, and 16% declined to answer. This is led by the assumption that watching movies in their original versions is very useful for learning foreign languages. However, according to the same Eurobarometer, virtually no Romanian found this method—watching movies in their original version—to be the most efficient way to learn foreign languages, compared to 53 percent who preferred language lessons at school.

==== Serbia ====
In the 21st-century, prominent dubbing/voice actors in Serbia include actors Marko Marković, Vladislava Đorđević, Jelena Gavrilović, Dragan Vujić, Milan Antonić, Boris Milivojević, Radovan Vujović, Goran Jevtić, Ivan Bosiljčić, Gordan Kičić, Slobodan Stefanović, Dubravko Jovanović, Dragan Mićanović, Slobodan Ninković, Branislav Lečić, Jakov Jevtović, Ivan Jevtović, Katarina Žutić, Anica Dobra, Voja Brajović, Nebojša Glogovac and Dejan Lutkić.

==== United Kingdom ====
Hinterland displays a not so common example of a bilingual production. Each scene is filmed twice, in the English and Welsh languages, apart from a few scenes where Welsh with subtitles is used for the English version.

==== France ====
In France, dubbing is the norm. Most movies with a theatrical release, including all those from major distributors, are dubbed. Those that are not, are foreign independent films whose budget for international distribution is limited, or foreign art films with a niche audience.

Almost all theaters show movies with their French dubbing ("VF", short for version française). Some of them also offer screenings in the original language ("VO", short for version originale), generally accompanied with French subtitles ("VOST", short for version originale sous-titrée). A minority of theaters (usually small ones) screen exclusively in the original language. According to the CNC (National Centre for Cinematography), VOST screenings accounted for 16.9% of tickets sold in France. In addition, dubbing is required for home entertainment and television screenings. However, since the advent of digital television, foreign programs are broadcast to television viewers in both languages (sometimes, French with audio description is also aired); while the French-language track is selected by default, viewers can switch to the original-language track and enable French subtitles. As a special case, the binational television channel Arte broadcasts both the French and German dubbing, in addition to the original-language version.

==== Switzerland ====
Unlike in Austria and Germany, cinemas in German-speaking Switzerland historically strongly preferred subtitled versions of foreign-language films. Swiss film distributors commissioned dual-language prints with both German and French subtitles as the primary version, with the dubbed version also shown. In recent years, however, there has been a shift towards dubbed versions, which now account for the majority of showings.

==== Hungary ====
In Hungary, dubbing is almost universally common. Almost every foreign movie or TV show released in Hungary is dubbed into Hungarian. The history of dubbing dates back to the 1950s, when the country was still under communist rule. One of the most iconic Hungarian dubs was of the American cartoon The Flintstones, with a local translation by József Romhányi. The Internetes Szinkron Adatbázis (ISzDB) is the largest Hungarian database for film dubs, with information for many live action and animated films. On page 59 of the Eurobarometer, 84% of Hungarians said that they prefer dubbing over subtitles.

==== Italy ====
Italian dubbing led to the creation of a variation of the language heavily influenced by the source language of most works, especially based on works originally in the English language: doppiaggese (or dubbese).

==== Poland ====
In the past, foreign movies were all subtitled in Polish.

In the 1980s, due to budget cuts, state-run TV saved on tapes by voicing films over live during transmission. Overall, during 1948–1998, almost 1,000 films were dubbed in Polish. In the 1990s, dubbing films and TV series continued, although often also for one emission only. In 1995, Canal+ was launched in Poland. In its first years, it dubbed 30% of its schedule, including popular films and TV series such as Friends, but this proved unsuccessful.

==== Spain ====
In Spain, dubbing has been more widespread since 1932, when the Second Republic decided to introduce it in Madrid and Barcelona. The first film dubbed into Spanish to be known was Devil and the Deep, in 1932. Dubbing, after the Spanish Civil War, was reinforced by the regulations promulgated by the Government of Francisco Franco on April 23, 1941, at its time based on Mussolini's Language Defense Law of 1938. This law had two political purposes: Nationalism through linguistic identity and, more subtly, control through censorship of foreign ideas that could be alien to national interests.

=== Latin America ===
==== Brazil ====
In Brazil, foreign programs are invariably dubbed into Brazilian Portuguese on free-to-air TV, with only a few exceptions. Films shown at cinemas are generally offered with both subtitled and dubbed versions, with dubbing frequently being the only choice for children's movies. Subtitling was primarily for adult audience movies until 2012. Since then, dubbed versions also became available for all ages. As a result, in recent years, more cinemas have opened in Brazil, attracting new audiences to the cinema who prefer dubbing. According to a Datafolha survey, 56% of Brazilian movie theaters' audience prefer to watch dubbed movies. Most of the dubbing studios in Brazil are in the cities of Rio de Janeiro and São Paulo. Because of the limited global market for Portuguese-language dubbing companies, Brazilian-made dubs are frequently exported to the rest of the Portuguese-speaking world, including Portugal itself.

The first film to be dubbed in Brazil was the Disney animation Snow White and the Seven Dwarfs in 1938. By the end of the 1950s, most of the movies, TV series and cartoons on television in Brazil were shown in its original sound and subtitles. However, in 1961, a decree of President Jânio Quadros ruled that all foreign productions on television should be dubbed. This measure boosted the growth of dubbing in Brazil, and has led to several dubbing studios since then. The biggest dubbing studio in Brazil was Herbert Richers, headquartered in Rio de Janeiro and closed in 2009. At its peak in the 80s and 90s, the Herbert Richers studios dubbed about 70% of the productions shown in Brazilian cinemas.

==== Mexico ====
Dubbing must be made in Mexico by Mexican nationals or foreigners residing in Mexico.

=== North America ===
==== French-speaking Canada ====
Like in France, dubbing is the most common and most popular translation method for films and television shows in French-speaking Canada. This became the norm in the mid-1940s.

Most films and television shows dubbed in French-speaking Canada are dubbed in a "neutral" or "international" French to be understandable by a broad Francophone audience regardless of the region and to give prestige to Canadian French. Despite the goal of being understandable to all Francophones, dubs from French-speaking Canada are not popular in France due to their own laws regarding dubs and the fact that "neutral" French is disliked by the French.

The first foreign-language film to be dubbed in joual, the Québécois French vernacular, was the 1977 film Slap Shot, released in French-speaking Canada as Lancer-frappé. The film was originally dubbed in European French as La Castagne, but this standard French dub proved unpopular and disliked by the film's writer Nancy Dowd. Universal Pictures, the film's distributor, gave the French-speaking Canada dubbing rights to Hubert Fielden, a Frenchman who lived in Quebec. Fielden decided to make the Canadian French dub in uncensored joual. The film was written by a Québécois and stars Québécois actors, but the decision to dub the film in joual was to make it resonate even further with a French-Canadian audience. The joual dub ended up being immensely popular in Quebec and Lancer-frappé became a cult classic in French-speaking Canada.

Until the 1980s, the vast majority French-language dubbed films in Quebec were imported from France. The government of Quebec, under then-premier Robert Bourassa and with the support of the then-minister of Culture and Cultural Affairs Denis Hardy, passed the Act Respecting the Cinema in 1975. The Act mandated that all foreign language films shown in Quebec must be dubbed in French. This, along with the aftermath of the Quiet Revolution and the rise of the Quebec sovereignty movement, led to the immense popularity of dubs made in French-speaking Canada in the late 1970s. The Act Respecting the Cinema was replaced by a new act of the same name in 1983 by the government of then-premier René Lévesque with the support of then-minister of Cultural Affairs Clément Richard. The new Act mandated that a foreign-language film could only be shown in Quebec if it came with a French dub. If not already dubbed, one had to be made within 60 days.

In 2003, Howard Ryshpan and Jocelyne Côté, the founders of the Québécois dubbing studio Ryshco Media, created the dubbing software DubStudio. The software was created as a way to automize the lip-synch band, the most commonly used dubbing method in use since the 1950s. According to Ryshpan and Côté, the goal of the software is to "become the global standard of dubbing methods and automated dialogue replacement." DubStudio was collaborated with the Centre de Recherche Informatique de Montréal (CRIM) who also worked on electronic directory assistance for telephones. The software detects the film or television show's dialogue, detects the length, and transforms it into phonemes. The script, already inputted into the software, is also transformed into phonemes. The software then combines the two sets of phonemes to create an electronic equivalent of a lip-synch band and then transforms the phonemes into text. DubStudio, however, does not translate the text.

The Act Respecting the Cinema regained popularity in 2007 when Mario Dumont, then-leader of the Official Opposition of Quebec and leader of the Action démocratique du Québec (ADQ) introduced Bill 193: An Act to amend the Act Respecting the Cinema. The bill proposed that foreign-language films released in Quebec must be dubbed in Québécois French. Dumont also cited a similar law in France that has taken effect since 1945. The origin of Bill 193 came after Dumont took his children to see the French dub of Shrek the Third. The film was dubbed in European French, which Dumont found incomprehensible. Bill 193 was also supported by the Parti Québécois, the same party who created the Act Respecting the Cinema that the ADQ sought to amend. The Quebec Liberal Party, who at the time held a minority government led by then-premier Jean Charest, was against the bill. Since it was adopted at the end of the parliamentary session, Bill 193 died and did not become a law. The bill only made it to the second reading.

The first television show to be dubbed in joual was The Flintstones which premiered under in French-speaking Canada under the name Les Pierrafeu in 1971. However, the most popular French-Canadian dub is the Québécois dub of the television show The Simpsons which premiered in 1991, twenty years after Les Pierrafeu. To this day, Les Simpson is the longest running French-Canadian dub of a television show. Like the film Slap Shot, the show was dubbed in joual to make it more relatable to a Québécois audience. Additionally, the American pop culture references and celebrities are localized with French-Canadian ones. Examples include replacing the Denver Broncos gridiron football team with the Montreal Alouettes, characters talking about CÉGEP (Quebec's college system), and an American politician being replaced by former prime minister of Canada Brian Mulroney. References to the French language itself are also changed, often poking fun at the different regional accents. For instance, in season 1 episode 11 "The Crepes of Wrath", the character Bart Simpson goes on a student exchange trip to France. A major recurring joke in the original episode is that no one is able to understand him because he does not speak French. In the Québécois dub, the joke is changed to Bart's Québécois accent being incomprehensible to the French.

A controversy arose in 2025 when it was announced that the French-Canadian dub would no longer be produced due to a disagreement between the dubbing company and the producers of the show. Disney, the owner of The Simpsons, awarded the rights to the Québécois dub to Corus Entertainment, who broadcasts the dub on their television channel Télétoon. However, Disney also acquired the dub from Corus to broadcast on their streaming platform Disney+. Corus claims that this decreases revenue and viewers from their own television channel. This disagreement also applies to the other Corus-produced French-Canadian dubs of Disney television shows, notably Family Guy and American Dad. Shortly afterwards, Joshua Biasotto created a petition titled Sauvons le doublage québécois des Simpsons (Let's save the Québécois dub of The Simpsons) on the website change.org. The petition received thousands of signatures within a few hours and as of November 2025 has over 31,000 verified signatures. The petition gained the support of notable Québécois figures, including, among others, Thiéry Dubé, the current French-Canadian voice of Homer Simpson, Guylaine Tremblay, a Québécois actor, and Ian Lafrenière, the Quebec's minister of Public Safety, minister responsible for First Nations and Inuit Relations, and minister responsible for Nord-du-Québec.

Like in English-speaking Canada, the Canadian Radio-television and Telecommunications Commission (CRTC) mandates French television services for the visually and audibly impaired. Unlike most of its films and television shows, French-speaking Canada uses voiceovers for described video and audio description for the visually impaired. As for the deaf community, Quebec has its own sign language: Quebec Sign Language. While most films and television shows use subtitles, dubs in Quebec Sign Language are becoming more common. Radio-Canada, the French public broadcaster of Canada, offers some news programs dubbed in Quebec Sign Language. Quebec's public broadcaster Télé-Québec has also started dubbing some of its shows in Quebec Sign Language in collaboration with the Ministry of Education and Higher Education and the Office des personnes handicapées du Québec (OPHQ).

Dubbing is also common in Indigenous languages of Canada. In 1999, the Aboriginal Peoples Television Network (APTN) launched as the first national Indigenous broadcaster in the world. Initially, 60 hours per week were dedicated to Indigenous languages, while the rest of the channel's programming was in English and French. The movies and television shows that were not originally created in an Indigenous language were given full dubs in an Indigenous language. In 2024, APTN changed its format by launching APTN Languages – a new channel dedicated entirely to programming in 18 Indigenous languages. The main channel was rededicated to English and French programming, and the Indigenous-language programs were moved to the new channel. Among the Indigenous languages on the channel include Michif: the Indigenous language of the Métis. This language originated as a mix of mainly Cree and Canadian French. The French language specifically influenced the nouns, adjectives, articles, and numbers. As of December 2025, APTN Languages airs two television shows dubbed in Michif: Michif Country and Red River Gold.

There are two labour unions that represent the dubbing industry in French-speaking Canada: Union des artistes (UDA) and the National Association of Professional Dubbers (ANDP). The UDA was founded in 1937 as the Association nationale des doubleurs professionnels to represent singers in Quebec. The union later became the UDA in 1952. Today, the UDA represents around 13,000 actors, singers, animators, and dancers across Quebec. The ANDP, which represents specifically the dubbing industry, was founded in 1976 as the Association québécoise des industries techniques du cinéma et de la television. The union adopted its current name in 2005. Over 1,250 people in the Canadian dubbing industry are represented by the ANDP.

The UDA and the ANDP first signed their first partnership agreement in 1978. Through the partnership agreement, different employees in the dubbing field are represented by different unions. Dubbers, voice directors, and dubbing translators are represented by the UDA. The sound recordists, sound mixers, video editors, audio recording technicians, video recording technicians, and non-professional staff are represented by the ANDP.

The work week for dubbers in Quebec is Monday to Friday and workdays are usually under 8 hours. The workdays are divided into three shifts: morning, afternoon, and evening. The maximum hours for the morning and evening shifts are 4 hours, and the maximum for the afternoon shift is 5 hours. During the recording session, the dubber sees the original scene and reads their lines before the take. After the take, the dubber is allowed to listen to their recording.

For a cartoon, a fiction television series, a commission, or a direct-to-video or direct-to-streaming film, dubbers make $142.57 for the first hour and $42.78 for every additional half-hour. For feature films, the rate is $154.46 for the first hour and $46.34 for every additional half-hour. Narration and voiceover make $121.48 for the first hour and $36.45 for every additional half-hour.

Voice directors work nine-hour workdays from Monday to Friday and consists of 2 or 3 recording sessions per day. They earn $87.15 per hour for cartoons, $92.41 per hour for fiction television series, $116.22 per hour for feature films, $58.26 for narration and voiceovers, $89.63 per hour for Canadian direct-to-video and direct-to-streaming films, $89.72 per hour for commissions, and $95.72 per hour for international direct-to-video and direct-to-streaming films. If a voice director owns a studio but is not directing the dub, they earn $148.52 per hour for half-hour length cartoons, narration, voiceovers, and Canadian direct-to-video and direct-to-streaming films; $237.62 per hour for hour length cartoons, narration, voiceovers, and Canadian direct-to-video and direct-to-streaming films; and $504.95 per hour for fiction television series, feature films, and commissions.

Dubbing translators do not have set working hours. They work on demand. Dubbing translators are paid $2.12 per line for cartoons and $1.64 for any additional line. For drama television series, they are paid $1.97 per line if 30 minutes long or less and $2.21 per line if over 30 minutes. The rates for feature films are $3.34 per line for the first 1,500 lines, $2.32 per line for the next 1,000 lines, and $2.01 per line for any additional lines. Rates for narration and voiceovers range from $128.37 per line for audio 7 minutes long or less to $2,053.97 for two-hour-long audio. For direct-to-video or direct-to-streaming productions, dubbing translators earn $2.91 per line for the first 1,500 lines and $1.83 for any additional line for Canadian productions and $3.02 per line for the first 1,500 lines and $1.90 for any additional line for international productions. Rates for commissions are $2.21 per line.

==== United States and English-speaking Canada ====
In the United States and English-speaking Canada, live-action foreign films are usually shown in theaters with their original languages and English subtitles, as live-action dubbed movies have not done well in the U.S. since the 1980s. The 1982 United States theatrical release of Wolfgang Petersen's Das Boot was the last major release to go out in both original and English-dubbed versions, and the film's original version actually grossed much higher than the English-dubbed version. Later on, English-dubbed versions of international hits like Un indien dans la ville, Godzilla 2000, Anatomy, Pinocchio, The Return of Godzilla and High Tension flopped at United States box offices. When Miramax planned to release the English-dubbed versions of Shaolin Soccer and Hero in the United States cinemas, their English-dubbed versions scored badly in test screenings in the United States, so Miramax finally released the films in United States cinemas with their original language. Still, English-dubbed movies have much better commercial potential in ancillary markets; therefore, more distributors would release live-action foreign films in theaters with their original languages (with English subtitles), then release both original versions and English-dubbed versions in ancillary markets.

Many films have also been dubbed into indigenous languages of the United States and Canada. Disney's Moana, set in Hawaii, was dubbed into the Hawaiian language in 2018. The Navajo language has also received dubs of many films, the first three being Star Wars: Episode IV - A New Hope (Navajo: Sǫʼtah Anah), Finding Nemo (Navajo: Nemo Hádéést'į́į́) and Fistful of Dollars (Navajo: Béeso Dah Yiníłjaa'). The Navajo dubs of Star Wars and Finding Nemo are also available on Disney Plus.

=== Oceania ===
==== Australia and New Zealand ====
Much like in North America, English dubs of foreign non-English productions in Australia and New Zealand are mostly limited to animation as well as children's media. However, these countries do not often produce English dubs domestically and prefer instead to import existing dubs from other English-speaking countries, primarily the United States and the United Kingdom.

Because over 25% of Australians speak a language other than English at home, some cinemas show foreign-language films, for example in Chinese (the most spoken language in Australia other than English). There are also Chinese-language cinemas in Australia, such as the Hoyts Mandarin cinema in Chatswood, Sydney.

Many episodes of SpongeBob SquarePants (Māori: SpongeBob Tarau Porowhā) and Dora the Explorer (Māori: Dora Mātātoa) were dubbed into Māori and shown on Māori Television to promote the Māori language among children. Disney has also started dubbing films into Māori. These films are shown in cinemas in New Zealand and some parts of Australia and then released globally on Disney+. In 2019, the film Moana was dubbed into Māori. In 2022, The Lion King (Māori: Te Kīngi Raiona) and Frozen were dubbed into Māori.

Compared to Māori, dubs into Australian Aboriginal languages are much rarer. The first film to be fully dubbed into an Aboriginal language was the Hong Kong martial arts film Fists of Fury, which received a full Nyungar dub from an independent Perth-based studio in 2021. The first Indigenous Australian cartoon, Little J & Big Cuz, is available in English and several indigenous languages, including Gija, Nyungar, Torres Strait Creole, Palawa Kani, Warlpiri, Yolŋu, Arrernte, Pitjantjatjara and Kriol.

==== French Polynesia ====
French Polynesia almost exclusively shows films and television programs in either French or English. However, in 2016, Disney's Moana became the first film to be dubbed into the Tahitian language.

== Alternatives ==
=== Subtitles ===
In Portugal, one terrestrial channel, TVI, dubbed U.S. series like Dawson's Creek into Portuguese.

=== Dubbing and subtitling ===
Netflix provides both subtitles and dubbed audio with its foreign language shows, including Brazil's dystopian 3% and the German thriller Dark. Viewer testing indicates that its audience is more likely to finish watching a series if they select to view it with dubbed audio rather than translated subtitles. Netflix now streams its foreign language content with dubbed audio as default in an effort to increase viewer retention.

=== Voice-over translation ===
In voice-over translation, unlike in dubbing, the translation is recorded over the original audio track which can be heard in the background. This method of translation is most often used in documentaries and news reports to translate words of foreign-language interviewees in countries where subtitling is not the norm. Voice-over translation with a single translator's voice used to be ubiquitous in Russian-speaking countries on films shown on cable television and sold on video, especially illegal copies. In Poland, it remains the standard localization technique on television and (as an option) on many DVDs; full dubbing is generally reserved for children's material.

== Dubbing into varieties ==
Hispanic America and Spain use different versions of dubbed films and series. Due to the variety of Spanish accents in Latin America, the dubbing for this region is made in Standard Spanish, which avoids colloquialisms and whose pronunciation, vocabulary, and grammatical features are not recognizable as belonging to any particular Latin American country. For this reason, it is made in different countries, mainly in Mexico, Argentina and Colombia, for the entire continent. In addition, some films have been dubbed to the accent of a certain region of Spanish-speaking Latin America, such as the animated movie The Incredibles, which in addition to being dubbed into European and Standard Spanish, was dubbed into the Rioplatense and Mexican varieties.

Similarly, in Flanders, the Dutch-speaking region of Belgium, cartoons are often dubbed locally by Flemish artists rather than using soundtracks produced in the Netherlands.

Sometimes, films are also dubbed into several German dialects (Berlinerisch, Kölsch, Saxonian, Austro-Bavarian or Swiss German), especially animated films and Disney films. They are as an additional "special feature" to entice the audience into buying it. Popular animated films dubbed into German variety include Asterix films (in addition to its Standard German version, every film has a particular variety version), The Little Mermaid, Shrek 2, Cars, (+ Austrian German) and Up (+ Austrian German).

Some live-action films or TV series have an additional German variety dubbing: Babe and its sequel, Babe: Pig in the City (German German, Austrian German, Swiss German); and Rehearsal for Murder, Framed (+ Austrian German); The Munsters, Serpico, Rumpole (+ Austrian German), and The Thorn Birds
