= Wheelie (disambiguation) =

A wheelie is a vehicle maneuver in which the front wheel or wheels come off the ground.

Wheelie may also refer to:

- "Wheelie" (Latto song), featuring 21 Savage
- Wheelie (Kid Phenomenon song), 2023
- Wheelie (Transformers), a Transformers character
- The title character from the Hanna Barbara cartoon Wheelie and the Chopper Bunch
- Wheelie bike
- Wheelie bin, waste container
- Wheelie, a slang term for wheelchair users

== See also ==
- Wheelies (virtual nightclub), a virtual-world nightclub
- Wheely, a vehicle for hire company
- Wheely (film), a 2018 Malaysian animated film
- Wiehle, a surname with a similar pronuciation
