= Doppiaggese =

Linguistic variety of Italian language used in film and television dubbing

Doppiaggese (often translated as dubbese) is a linguistic variety of the Italian language which appears in film and TV productions as a result of dubbing. This variation is characterized by a language heavily interefered by the source language (the foreign language spoken by the actors in the movie) and by a syntax and lexicon which have an unnatural or artificial final result in the language of arrival (the language spoken by viewers). Mostly, it is a result imposed by the need of finding a compromise between the translation and the script and that of the timing and lips of the original work.

The phenomenon "has directly influenced not only the language of Italian cinema (known as filmese), but also the Italian that is written and spoken tout court," either through the "numerous calques, especially from English, especially for the general impression of artificial formality and elimination of the typical variety of all dubs, in which the longshoreman speaks like an attorney". In most cases, caused by the pervasive influence of media in mass culture, artificial forms of doppiaggese affirmed strongly, establishing permanently in the target language, to a point where it causes the loss of perception of its original unnatural character.

The term "doppiaggese" is born as a neologism in a professional environment, seen as a halfway measure between self-ironic and pejorative.

== Characteristics ==
Also defined as a "paraliterary form of orality", doppiaggese is characterized by the strong presence of calques, sometimes accompanied by grammar or lexical mistakes, the usage of inadequate linguistic registers to the context and level of instruction of the character, and, in general, a flat and scarcely inventive style, which tends to emulate the structures of the source language. Fabio Rossi defines doppiaggese as «that hybrid form of Italian between false colloquiality (rich in calques and stereotypes), impeccable pronunciation and formalism".

The usage of doppiaggese can lead to changes to the lexicon of the commonly spoken language: some verbs that were previously unused, become, by effect of the languages used in the movies, more frequent, and, sometimes, gain meanings that originally did not have. As an example, the verb realizzare, which in doppiaggese replaces rendersi conto/capire/avere consapevolezza, calqued from the English to realize.

=== Linguistic interferences and lip syncing ===
However, it's worth specifying that sometimes it ends up being complex, if not impossible, to respect the mouth movements or the length of the speech of the actors on screen, as well as the number of syllables: some translations end up being forced to avoid ending up too different from the mimic of the actors.

From another viewpoint, as observed in a specific study dedicated to the language of TV series, most times, doppiaggese choices are derived from inadequate translations, with distortions and literal adhesion phenomena derived from English language expressions (either from British or American varieties), even when there are no lip syncing requisites. Translators have no choice but to use calques even when the equivalent Italian expression does not have any length problems: this being the case, for instance, of absolutely which is frequently and improperly translated as assolutamente sì, thus becoming a catchphrase, where the original expression would have been "certamente".

==== Calques ====
There are countless calques and typical forms of doppiaggese which, normally, as a pheonomena of profound interference, entered stably not only into the usage of filmese, but also in Italian, not only in the popular variation.

=== Hypercorrections ===
Another phenomenon stemming from doppiaggese is the usage of hypercorrections of some forms of prose, due to the poor attempts of the translators to follow the refinment of the language. An example is the excess of subjunctives in television dubs, which clearly dominates over the indicative forms in the verbs che, chi, quale (for example, 187 contro 2 in the Italian version of the film Born Yesterday by George Cukor:) in fact, the usage of subjunctive becomes automatic each time the verb apepars with inadequate relative clauses introduced by che, chi, quale, with abhorrent linguistic effects.

== Reactions ==
The usage of calques and linguistic forms typical of doppiaggese has become so widespread, even in common speak, to such an extent where, often, it is never understood as being foreign. Some forms became associated to the overarching dimensions of media: this refers to speakers whose lexicon is deeply influenced by the notable frequency in which such forms appear in the language of a television program and, in a smaller measure, that of movies. Some of these forms cause reactions of irritation and rejection, such as the case of the expression "assolutamente sì/assolutamente no" (or "assolutamente"; as an isolated adverb). As an example, the insistent use and abuse of the adverb "assolutamente", either in affirmative or negative forms, by Fedro Francioni, a contestant in the third edition of the reality show Grande Fratello. The same ferocious insistence in indulging on the intensive usage of the adverb "assolutamente" was attributed to Simona Ventura from the TV critic Aldo Grasso.

=== Satires of doppiaggese ===
In most cases, the instinctive usage of forms of doppiaggese are a source of inspiration for satires and ironic criticism. Some gags based on the peculiarities and tics found on television and cinema dubbing have become famous, such as, for instance, a dialog of a telenovela staged by Trio Lopez-Solenghi-Marchesini:

Bevi qualcosa, Pedro? Perché non bevi qualcosa, Pedro? (Do you drink something, Pedro? Why don't you drink something, Pedro?)

Also significant is the gag Chiquito y Paquito, the comic duo interpreted by Massimo Olcese and Adolfo Margiotta:

Ehi amico, dici a me? (Hey buddy, tell me?) Sì, dico a te! Fottiti! (Yes, I tell you! Fuck off!)

An example of the accumulation of linguistic tics coming from the language of television and cinema dubbing was offered by Filippo Ottoni, theatrical translator, in a speech at the Esperienze di multilinguismo in atto conference, held by Accademia della Crusca in May 2009, in which he intervened as president of AIDAC - Associazione italiana dialoghisti adattatori cinetelevisivi. In that occasion, Ottoni presented a recording, in which a young couple wakes up after spending the night together in their first casual meeting, without even knowing their respective names: an exchange of jokes during breakfast, with the contrast between the refined and admired expression of the boy (Giovanni, purist of the Italian language and follower of Accademia della Crusca) and the language the girl has («il mio nome è Sara... Sara Crusca» (my name is Sara... Sara Crusca), who follows MiBAC, the current Ministry of Culture), full, in a paroxistic manner, of tics and literary topics from mass media, and, in the aim of illustrating, according to Ottoni, "the type of language in which many Italian youths raised exclusively by TV fictions and feature films speak, affected by doppiaggese".

== Bibliography ==
- Giacomo Battiato (4 December 1991). "Stop al "doppiaggese". Il cinema italiano chiede la parola" (PDF). L'Unità. p. 19. Archived from the original (PDF) on 4 March 2016.
- Eleonora Di Fortunato e Mario Paolinelli (1996). Barriere linguistiche e circolazione delle opere audiovisive: la questione doppiaggio. Rome: AIDAC. ISBN 88-86690-09-6.
- Eleonora Di Fortunato; Mario Paolinelli (2005). Tradurre per il doppiaggio. La trasposizione linguistica nell'audiovisivo: teoria e pratica di un'arte imperfetta. Milano: Hoepli. ISBN 88-203-3385-6.
- Angela Sileo (2010). Il doppiaggio tra cinema e televisione (1950-2004). Naples: Loffredo Editore. ISBN 978-88-7564-426-0.
- Rossi, Fabio (2006). Il linguaggio cinematografico. Roma: Aracne.
- Fabio Rossi. "Doppiaggese, filmese e lingua italiana". Istituto dell'Enciclopedia italiana Treccani.
- Fabio Rossi, Cinema e lingua, Enciclopedia dell'Italiano (2010), Istituto dell'Enciclopedia italiana Treccani
- Fabio Rossi, Linguaggio dei fumetti, Enciclopedia dell'Italiano (2010), Istituto dell'Enciclopedia italiana Treccani
- Sergio Raffaelli, Lingua del film, Enciclopedia del Cinema (2003), Istituto dell'Enciclopedia italiana Treccani
- Alberto Castellano, «Doppiaggio», Enciclopedia del Cinema (2003), Istituto dell'Enciclopedia italiana Treccani
- Daria Motta, "Non ci posso credere...". L'italiano del doppiaggio televisivo, da Magazine, Istituto dell'Enciclopedia italiana Treccani
- Filippo Ottoni, Intervention of Filippo Ottoni (President of AIDAC: Italian Association of Film and Television Dialogue Adaptors, (Associazione italiana dialoghisti adattatori cinetelevisivi) at the "Esperienze di multilinguismo in atto" conference, Accademia della Crusca, May 2009 (with an example of a dialogue between two young people in which linguistic tics typical of doppiaggese abound)
