= Persona: Trinity Soul =

Japanese anime television series

- Persona Trinity Soul DVD Premium Edition cover released by NIS America

ペルソナ 〜トリニティ・ソウル〜 (Perusona ~Toriniti Sōru~)
- Anime television series
- Directed by: Atsushi Matsumoto
- Written by: Yasayuki Mutō
- Music by: Taku Iwasaki
- Studio: A-1 Pictures
- Licensed by: NA: NIS America; (Formerly)
- Original network: Tokyo MX, BS11, MBS, Animax, Chiba TV, CBC, TV Saitama, tvk
- Original run: January 5, 2008 – June 28, 2008
- Episodes: 26

Persona: Trinity Soul (Note: Persona: Trinity Soul (ペルソナ 〜トリニティ・ソウル〜, Perusona ~Toriniti Sōru~)) is a Japanese anime television series. It is a spin-off of the Persona video game series, taking place 10 years after Persona 3's events.

Produced by Aniplex and animated by its subsidiary A-1 Pictures, the series aired in Japan on Tokyo MX from January 5 to June 28, 2008. It also features music by Taku Iwasaki. In February 2010, NIS America announced it would broadcast the series in North America with the original Japanese dub.

According to the official Persona 3 Portable fanbook, Trinity Soul is considered to be an alternative entry in the series.

== Story ==
Persona: Trinity Soul takes place in 2020, approximately ten years after the end of Persona 3. It is set in Ayanagi City, a city located near the Sea of Japan, where the police force is investigating several "Reverse" cases, wherein the victims are turned inside-out. Ten years ago, Ayanagi City had been subjected to a sudden outbreak of Apathy Syndrome, which the city has since recovered from.

In the midst of the crisis, two brothers named Shin and Jun Kanzato move back to Ayanagi to see their elder brother Ryō, who is now the Superintendent of the Ayanagi City Police. It has been ten years since the three siblings last met with each other.

It was said that the mysterious incidents in Ayanagi City were linked to covert testing conducted under Keisuke Komatsubura's watch, which tried to locate all known Persona users and find the strongest by weeding them out via Persona experiments before it was disbanded.

== Characters ==
=== Kanzato family ===
Shin Kanzato (神郷 慎, Kanzato Shin)
Age: 17
Voiced by: Nobuhiko Okamoto
The seventeen-year-old protagonist. He is a second-year student at Naginomori Gakuen High School on the beginning of the anime, becomes a third year student during it. After his parents and little sister died, he and his brothers were under the care of their relatives in Tokyo, and ten years later they returned to their home town Ayanagi. Shin also has an interest in art, making clay models and is frequently seen sketching. Strangely, his art pieces resemble Personas and in one case, Igor. His birthday is January 19. His persona has the power to eliminate (cleanse) other personas with its sword. When he was seven years old his persona cleansed both his parents personas before they were completely extracted by Ayane, who almost caused both a reverse case and a fusion of both parents. Shin was deeply traumatized until he got hypnotized by Komatsubara to forget about that incident.
[Persona]: Abel(アベル)
Ryō Kanzato (神郷 諒, Kanzato Ryō)
Age: 28
Voiced by: Takehito Koyasu
Shin and Jun's brother, eldest of the three at twenty-eight. His personality is stoic to the point of being cold, even towards his younger brothers. He entered the police in order to investigate the strange incidents, becoming the youngest superintendent in history. He keeps all important details on the recent 'Reverse' cases to himself, restricting them from others in the police force. His birthday is December 18.
[Persona]: Cain(カイン)
Jun Kanzato (神郷 洵, Kanzato Jun)
Age: 14
Voiced by: Miyuki Sawashiro
The youngest of the Kanzato brothers. A second-year student at Naginomori Gakuen Middle School on the beginning of the anime, becomes a third-year student as the story progress. He began to lose the will to live after an incident that happened at the time their parents disappeared ten years before the series began. He had a twin sister, Yuki, whose dress he keeps. Oddly, Ryō overheard Jun seemingly speaking to a girl, presumably Yuki. This might indicate a spiritual body sharing, or multiple-personality disorder. He also has a certain level of perception ability and can hear the inner voices of people around him. He carries a pendant in the shape of a feather, which is a reminder of Yuki. During his visit to the beach, the water's reflection showed his twin sister summoning her Persona but not Jun. His fringe hides a scar on his forehead that came from the surgery involving him and Yuki. His birthday is February 4. It is told later that after the accident ten years ago, part of his brain was replaced with Yuki's, in an effort to prevent them both from dying (the decision was made by Ryō). His Persona is an accidental fusion of his and Yuki's.
[Persona]: Seth(セト)
Yuki Kanzato (神郷 結祈, Kanzato Yuki)
Age: deceased (would be 14)
Voiced by: Miyuki Sawashiro
The female twin of Jun. She died with her parents in a major accident ten years ago. She shares her Persona with Jun due to the fact that part of her brain was being used to replace his before her death. She sometimes takes control of Jun's body and had once been the sole inhabitant of their body after Jun's encounter with Ayane.
Haruka Kanzato (神郷 遥, Kanzato Haruka)
Voiced by: Fumi Morisawa
Mother of the Kanzato brothers. An artbook artist, she gave Yuki a 'Whale's Feather' as an amulet of happiness. She died in the Ayanagi City disaster when Ayane's Persona grabbed and nearly extracted her and Shigeru's personas, killing them.
Shigeru Kanzato (神郷 慈, Kanzato Shigeru)
Voiced by: Takuma Takewaka
Father of the Kanzato brothers. Like his wife, he was an artbook artist. He died alongside his wife Haruka when Ayane's Persona grabbed and nearly extracted his persona, killing him. It is revealed that they were involved in the same Persona research as Komatsubara.

=== Naginomori Gakuen ===
Takurō Sakakiba (榊葉拓朗, Sakakiba Takurō)
Age: 17
Voiced by: Hideki Tasaka
A classmate of Shin's who he becomes acquainted with him on the first day he attends school. He is an easy-going individual and sports a distinct afro. Surprisingly, he has a Persona, which awakens when Shin tries to do Shadow Extraction on him. Unfortunately, he showed very little ability in being able to control it, as it often flew off at random rather than fight when summoned (which became a recurring gag of sorts). Nonetheless, he does manage to master it by the end of the series. He also had a dream with Igor in it much like Shin did. He has a crush on Megumi.
Takuro's father had disappeared during the Apathy Crisis in Ayanagi City, due to unknown reasons. Takuro stated that his father shoulder his friend's debts alone. He came back in a woman's body, although Takuro was unable to accept the possibility when meeting for the first time.
[Persona]: Spartacus
Megumi Kayano (茅野めぐみ, Kayano Megumi)
Age: 17
Voiced by: Kana Asumi
A classmate of Shin's, though he actually saw her at a restaurant arguing with someone the night before he started school. She is a member of the Street Dance club and has a frank and straightforward character. She has a dislike for Shadow Extraction, and frequently scolds her friends for partaking in it. Megumi had her Persona awakened when she was still young during an accident after which her stepbrother died. Since then, she harbored a distrust towards it, believing it had chosen not to save her brother because of her inherent jealousy rather than not being fast enough. However, the growing crisis concerning Marebito eventually makes her recognize it as a protector, and she uses it for the rest of the series for the sake of her friends.
[Persona]: Diana
Kanaru Morimoto (守本叶鳴, Morimoto Kanaru)
Age: 17
Voiced by: Mai Nakahara
A somewhat timid girl who is acquainted with Shin, Megumi, and Takurō. She is very interested in Shadow Extraction, and she asked Takurō to do a Shadow Extraction on her, which seems to be a forced invoking of a Persona to create a euphoria similar to taking a drug. She suffers from occasional memory loss where she sometimes cannot remember why she is at a place or even where she is at. In the past, she and Mayuri lived in a nursing facility. She becomes addicted to Shadow Extraction and this may have caused multiple personalities due to her sudden change in attitude and manner when talking to people, as well as suddenly saying things about what a Persona is without remembering what she said. She also demonstrates a romantic interest in Shin which is later confirmed by Yuki. She is eventually revealed to be a machine, much in the same nature as Aigis from Persona 3. Unfortunately, because of her artificial nature, her working lifespan is much shorter than a human's lifespan. After severing ties with Marebito, she peacefully dies in the company of Shin.
Kanaru is unique in that she has the ability to invoke two Persona rather than the conventional one. However, the first one seen (Ashtoreth, in episode 20) proves to be the Persona of her "other personality" that is loyal to Marebito. She later invokes her own (Astarte) during a fierce fight between the Marebito and her friends, which briefly pacifies the battlefield in a stunning display of power. While most of the Persona in the series are humanoid, Kanaru's looks much simpler and resembles a jellyfish. Megumi comments that it is because Kanaru's is just a "baby Persona". Despite the death of its "master", her friends somehow manage to invoke this Persona one last time during the final battle.
[Persona]: Ashtoreth/Astarte
Yumi Tasaka (田坂悠美, Tasaka Yumi)
Voiced by: Fumie Mizusawa
Megumi's senior in the Street Dance club. She was under police protection during the period of the 'Reverse' incidents. During that time she was attacked by the Outsiders and almost had her Persona forcefully extracted. She was rescued, but suffered Post-traumatic stress disorder and was hospitalized. Her Persona is damaged from the extraction attempt.
Tōru Inui (戌井暢)
Voiced by: Tomokazu Seki
Caretaker of the student dormitory. He keeps an old dog although pets are prohibited in the dorms. He had taken footage of Personas in action with his camera. He also knows a great deal about persona users saying that there were a lot of them around him many years ago. He also carries a gun in his jacket which he never uses. He might be Ken Amada from Persona 3 under an "alias".
Mayuri Yamasaki (山咲まゆり, Yamasaki Mayuri)
Voiced by: Mayumi Sako
A mysterious transfer student and a friend of Kanaru. She lived with Kanaru in a nursing facility in the past. Strange things started to happen after she transferred to Naginomori Gakuen High School. Her true identity is Saki Tachibana, a member of the Outsiders. Her favorite food seems to be beef bowls and she can quickly finish a big bowl in seconds; the feat contradicts her composed beauty image and greatly surprised Jun and Ryō.

=== Ayanagi Police ===
Eiko Nikaido (二階堂映子, Nikaido Eiko)
Voiced by: Sanae Kobayashi
A medical examiner from the North Japan Medical Examiner's Office. Currently at the Ayanagi Police Station. She is also a longtime family friend of the Kanzato siblings. In the third episode, she visited Jun at Ryō's house and went to pick up Shin at the Ayanagi City hospital. Shin has a childhood crush on her even when she admits that she loves Ryō. She is currently investigating the case of the mysterious disappearances that occurred at Toyama Bay.
Kunio Itō (伊藤久仁雄, Itō Kunio)
Voiced by: Hisao Egawa
A sergeant and chief of the Ayanagi Criminal Affairs Department. He suspects Ryō to be hiding something about the recent "Reversed" cases before he decides to help investigate the true nature of the Apathy Syndrome crisis.
Tomohiro Narasaki (楢崎智弘, Narasaki Tomohiro)
Voiced by: Yoshihisa Kawahara
An investigator of the Ayanagi Criminal Affairs Department. He is a tall person nearing two metres. He works with Itō and is keeping watch on Ryō's actions before being sent to monitor Jun and the others from Naginomori Gakuen.
Kubo (クボ)
Voiced by: Hiroshi Naka
The vice chief of the Ayanagi Police Station.

=== Outsiders ===
A group of Persona-users (possibly a non-natural type, medically induced) who seem to use their special abilities to steal other people's Personas. The group is called "Marebito" in Japanese and carries the meaning of a "foreign stranger" and "outsider."

Tōma Shikura (紫倉統馬, Shikura Tōma)
Voiced by: Daisuke Namikawa
A member of the Outsiders, he acts as the leader of the group. Tōma seems to be a cool and collected individual, but in the third episode he shows aggressive tendencies. He was killed in battle by Ryō, and afterwards an unknown chemical is discovered in his body. His death is kept in secret and was not publicised. However, there's some within his organization who claim that they have seen him walk about.
[Persona]: Nebuzaradan
Yūji Kimoto (紀本祐史, Kimoto Yūji)
Voiced by: Nobuo Tobita
A member of the Outsiders, one of the executors of the Reverse incident. His Persona has the special ability to extract others' Personae, this ability is the cause of the 'Reverse' incidents. After being defeated by Shin's Persona, Yūji lost his Persona. He seems to be the most mentally unbalanced of the Outsiders and is often shown taking some kind of drug. He had a part-time job giving out balloons in a bear costume. Yūji is executed by Mariya after he went renegade by escaping from their compound.
[Persona]: Utnapishtim
Sōtarō Senō (瀬能壮太郎, Senō Sōtarō)
Age: 16
Voiced by: Motoki Takagi
Another member of the Outsiders. He does not like working in groups and usually moves alone. His Persona also display the Persona extraction ability. Sōtarō attempted to fight Shin, but he ended up gravely injured after Shin's Persona countered his. Killed in episode 22.
[Persona]: Gukyo
Saki Tachibana (橘花沙季, Tachibana Saki)
Voiced by: Mayumi Sako
Another member of the Outsiders, the only female member. Saki appears calm and quiet, and she moves quickly while fighting. She has an affection for Tōma. Similar to Yūji, she lost her Persona after her defeat by Shin, but before that her Persona had actually been taken in by Sōtarō's Persona. Afterwards she was seen in a mysterious device that reattachs her Persona. She appears in Naganomori Gakuen High School as transfer student named Mayuri Yamazaki, which could be her real identity. The strange incidents in school were caused by her half-berserk Persona due to overdosage of the drug. Interested in the Persona ability of Jun, she decides to keep going to school. Saki later kidnaps Yuki, in Jun's body, and activates Kanaru's persona. Killed in episode 22.
[Persona]: Nebuchadnezzar
Taiichi Udo
Voiced by: Hiroki Yasumoto
A tall man with shades and muscles.
[Persona]: Hermóðr
Wakasa Kusu
Voiced by: Tsubasa Yonaga
The older twin between himself and Shiiba. He has a small ponytail and is always smiling.
[Persona]: Shinshukuho
Shiiba Kusu
Voiced by: Tsubasa Yonaga
The younger twin between himself and Wakasa. He has short hair and is always frowning.
[Persona]: Koteitoku
Mariya Kujou (マリヤ・クジョウ)
Voiced by: Nobuyuki Katsube
The man in the wheelchair who is regarded as the mastermind behind the Outsiders. He at some point died, and allowed his persona to devour him to extend his life span. He uses the Outsiders to gather "A-levels" and during the process he becomes interested in Shin's Persona ability. His original name was Keisuke Komatsubara.
[Persona]: Gozanze

=== Returning characters ===
Akihiko Sanada (真田 明彦, Sanada Akihiko)
Voiced by: Hikaru Midorikawa
He is seen talking with Ryō on the phone in the beginning of the series. He knows about the Persona and Reverse cases as they are usually the conversation topic. He is currently working with the police force after prior events 10 years ago from Persona 3. He was one of the main character's companions in Persona 3. As of episode 14, Akihiko had officially entered the universe of Persona: Trinity Soul, seen entering the elevator of the police station behind Shin and then later talking with Inui as a member of Marebito loses control of his persona in the city square. He can't evoke his Persona anymore because he passed a certain age and doesn't take the drug which allows the forceful evoking of Persona that Ryō takes.
Igor (イゴール, Igōru)
Voiced by: Isamu Tanonaka
An old man who appeared to Shin and Jun as a fortune teller in the first episode. He is a major character from the Persona game series, as the one who fused the main characters' Personas and aided the protagonists in each Persona game on their journeys.

=== Unknown characters ===
Ayane Komatsubara
Voiced by: Mamiko Noto
A ghostly girl with red hair that appears and disappears before the Kanzato siblings. Surrounding her are "whale feathers," an object from the last artbook of the Kanzato brothers' parents. When sliced or shot by the Kanzato brothers' persona, she disappears in a cloud of whale feathers. In recent episodes, it is revealed that she is the daughter of Keisuke Komatsubara who conducted persona experiments on her and was the culprit behind the Ayanagi City disaster when he summoned her persona that affected a part of the city and gave its victims Apathy Syndrome.
Her name is first revealed to Jun during a "date". She is also responsible for removing Jun from his body and leaving Yuki unable to call their persona. Her power seems to draw from the "whale", as she refers to it, which causes the strange events isolated around the city. A clone of her, created by her father, was defeated by Jun/Yuki's Persona and the fate of Ayane is unknown, although she is presumed deceased, due to the experiments conducted on her.
[Persona]: Aditi/Devi

== Production ==
A promo video had been on the show's official website, created by A-1 Pictures.

Atsushi Matsumoto, known for his involvement in Blood+, was pitched to be director. Shigenori Soejima designed the original characters for Yuriko Ishii. Yasayuki Mutō was responsible for doing the script with Shinsuke Ōnishi, Shōgo Yasukawa and Saya Matsuda. The script was done by Yasayuki Mutō.

According to a statement released by Yutaka Omatsu, he said the show is different from the Persona 3 game as the "divergence are the many different aspects that the characters and story share."

The first opening theme song to the series is "Breakin' Through", performed by Shūhei Kita, as winner of the Animax Anison Grand Prix, while the first ending theme song was "Suicides Love Story", performed by Nana Kitade. The second opening theme and ending theme songs, from episode 14 onwards, were "Word of the Voice", performed by Flow, and "Found Me", by Yumi Kawamura, respectively.

Trinity Soul's soundtrack was composed by Taku Iwasaki.

The anime was made available in Japan via streaming services including Amazon Prime Video, Bandai Channel, Hulu, ABEMA, FOD, U-NEXT and d Anime Store.

== Media ==
=== DVD ===
Trinity Soul was sold by NIS America via DVD as an entry title with Toradora!, PandoraHearts, and Our Home's Fox Deity.

=== Novel ===
A novel adaptation was released on October 10, 2008, and on November 29, 2008. This adaptation centers more on the Marebito and their involvement in Ayanagi City in the Reverse cases.

=== Visual Book ===
The show's visual book was released on October 10, 2008. It contains more details on the story, characters and the personas used in the show.

=== Manga ===
Two manga adaptations were released. One was released via DNA Media Comics, with the other one released via Bros Comix Ex.

== Reception ==
In an anime column by Mania.com, it said that the show was good in terms of having excellent animation though it noted the huge contrast of the distrust between the Kanzato brothers and the mysterious supernatural attacks on Ayanagi City. Japanator noted that the atmosphere is very dark, similar to Darker than Black.
