= Vladislava Đorđević =

Serbian actress

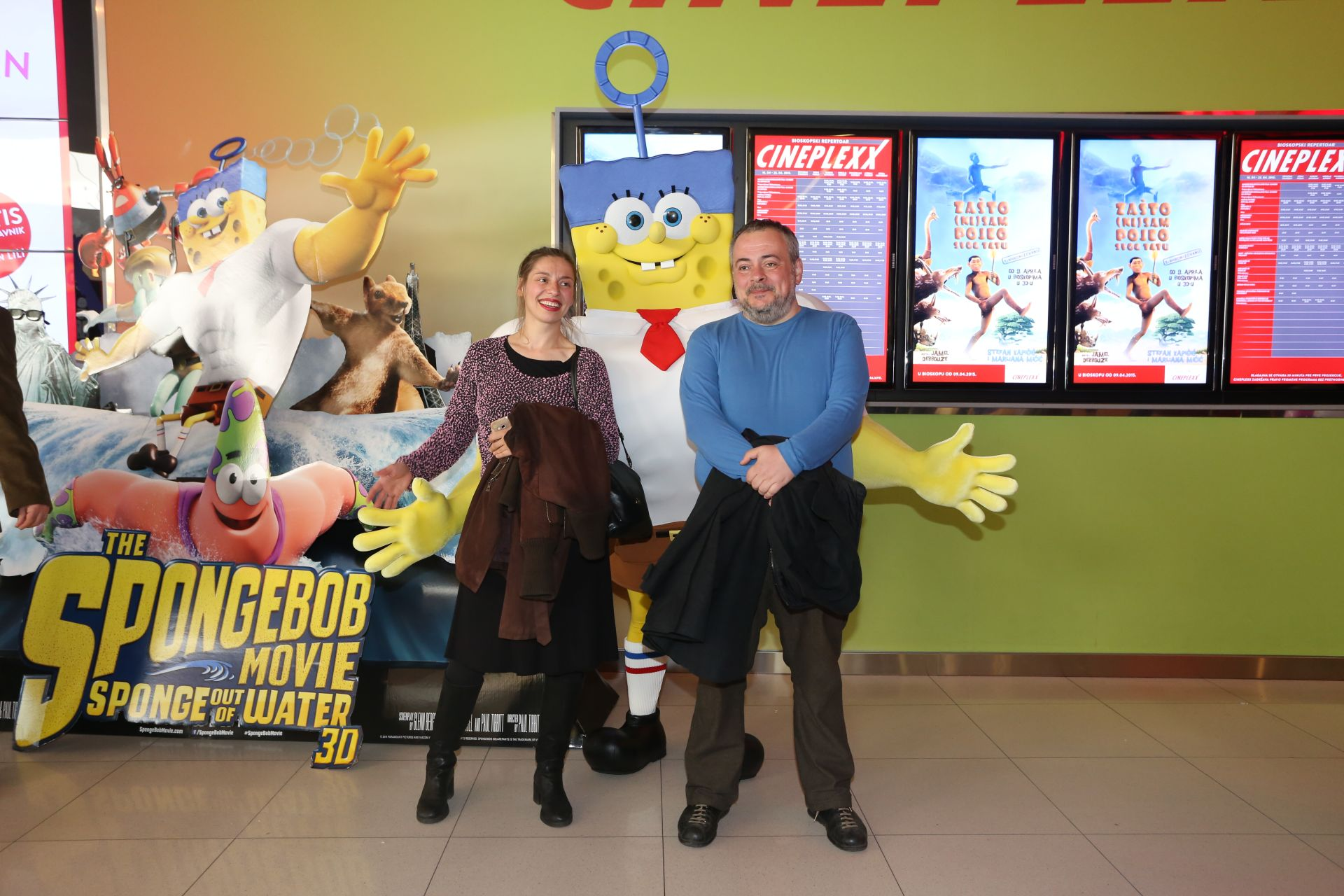
- Born: 10 May 1974 (age 51); Belgrade, SFR Yugoslavia
- Occupation: Actress
- Years active: 2000–present

Vladislava "Vaca" Đorđević (Serbian Cyrillic: Владислава "Ваца" Ђорђевић; born 10 May 1974) is a Serbian actress. She is best known for being SpongeBob's voice from the SpongeBob SquarePants series in Serbian dub.

== Biography ==
Vladislava Đorđević was born on May 10, 1974, in Belgrade, SFR Yugoslavia (now Serbia). She is a graduate of the Academy of Arts Braca Karic, class of professor Predrag Ejdus. She has also released two albums with the group Vrooom in which she was singing. She plays in the Malo pozorište Duško Radović, Atelje 212, and other theaters. She also works at the television B92, where she films drama shows, commercials and also syncs animated cartoons. For the best actress in "You're lying Melita", she was awarded with the Small Marulić in Split 2010.

== Personal life ==
Vladislava has an older sister Anja Đorđević who is a composer and interpreter.

== Serbian voice roles ==
| Dubbing year | Movie/series | Character(s) |
|---|---|---|
| 1997 | Skysurfer Strike Force (Prizor) | Lazerette, Nate's mom, etc. |
| 2002-2017 | SpongeBob SquarePants (B92) | SpongeBob, Mr. Krabs, Mermaid Man, all female roles |
| 2002 | ChalkZone | Rudy Tabootie, Penny Sanchez, Snap, Millerd Tabootie, |
| 2003 | Iron Nose | Capricia |
| 2003 | Jingle Bells (1999) | Beth |
| 2003 | O' Christmas Tree (1999) | Star, Chipmunk, Skunk |
| 2003 | Rugrats | all female roles |
| 2003 | The Ren & Stimpy Show | Stimpy |
| 2003 | We Wish You a Merry Christmas (1999) | Cindy |
| 2004 | CatDog | Dog, Winslow Oddfellow |
| 2004 | Hey Arnold! | all female roles |
| 2004 | Pippi Longstocking (1997 TV series) (Prizor) | Pippi |
| 2004 | The New Adventures of Ocean Girl | Princess Neri |
| 2004 | Thumbelina (Burbank Animation Studios) (Prizor) | Thumbelina |
| 2005 | Barbie: Fairytopia (Happy) | Dandelion |
| 2005 | Make Way For Noddy | Tessie, Dinah, Master Tubby Bear |
| 2005 | Mole's Christmas | Evil Weasel, Young Girl, Field Mice Bandmaster |
| 2005 | Pokémon Chronicles | Jessie, Ritchie, Hun, Nurse Joy |
| 2005 | Rollo and the Spirit of the Woods | Riitasointu, etc. |
| 2005-2010 | Simsala Grimm | Yoyo, birds, some female roles |
| 2005 | Stuart Little: The Animated Series | Stuart, all female roles |
| 2005 | Voltron: The Third Dimension | Allura, Haggar |
| 2006 | Barbie Fairytopia: Mermaidia | Dandelion, Delphine |
| 2006 | Cushion Kids | Baz, Bubs, Rapping River |
| 2006 | Dora the Explorer (B92) | Dora, all female roles |
| 2006 | Paw Patrol (B92) | Rubble, all female roles |
| 2006 | Inspector Gadget Saves Christmas | Penny |
| 2006 | Kangoo | Tiffany |
| 2006 | Marsupilami (S1) | Marsupilamie, Bibi, Bibu |
| 2006 | My Little Pony: The Princess Promenade | Pinkie Pie, Rainbow Dash, Daffidazey, Zipzee |
| 2006 | My Little Pony: A Charming Birthday | Razzaroo, Kimono, Rainbow Dash |
| 2006 | Open Season | Bobbie |
| 2006 | Skippy: Adventures in Bushtown | Opening theme |
| 2006 | Sonic Christmas Blast | Miles 'Tails' Prower, Scratch |
| 2006 | The Animal Train | Ben |
| 2006 | Tokyo Mew Mew | Corina, Kikki, Sardon |
| 2006 | Wild Records! | Selma, Cats, Squirrel, Parrot, Elephant etc. |
| 2007 | Barbie Fairytopia: Magic of the Rainbow | Dandelion, Glee, Lumina |
| 2007 | Los Lunnis | Lumbrela, Lulila |
| 2007 | Millionaire Dogs | Emmo |
| 2007 | Sprung! The Magic Roundabout | Ermintrude, Florence |
| 2008 | Anastasia (Golden Films) | Anastasia |
| 2008 | Say It With Noddy | Tessie, Dinah, Master Tubby Bear |
| 2009 | Ben 10 (Happy) | Gwen Tennyson |
| 2009 | Noddy In Toyland | Tessie, Dinah, Paper dolls |
| 2009 | The Penguins Of Madagascar | Mort, all female roles |
| 2009 | The Wild Thornberrys | Eliza, Marianne |
| 2013 | Khumba | Tombi, Meerkat #2 |
| 2014 | Legends of Oz: Dorothy's Return | Stenographer, Handmaiden |
| 2015 | The SpongeBob Movie: Sponge Out of Water | SpongeBob, Mr. Krabs, all female roles |
| 2016 | Ooops! Noah is Gone... | Leah |
| 2016 | The Wild Life | Tapir Rosie, Stachelschwein Epi |
| 2016 | Sheep & Wolves | Fortune-teller |
| 2016 | Zootopia | Fru Fru, Mrs. Otterton, Priscilla |
| 2017 | Deep | Maura |
| 2017 | Happy Family | Baba Yaga |
| 2017 | My Little Pony: The Movie | Princess Skystar |
| 2017 | Paddington 2 | Aunt Lucy |
| 2017 | Raven the little Rascal (TV series) | Frau Dachs |
| 2018 | Early Man | Magma |
| 2018 | Maya the Bee: The Honey Games | |
| 2018 | The Little Vampire 3D | |
| 2018 | Wheely | |
| 2019 | Elliot the Littlest Reindeer | |
| 2019 | The Snow Queen: Mirrorlands | |
