= Mayumi Sako =

Japanese actress (born 1978)

- 佐古 真弓
- Born: January 13, 1978 (age 48); Tokyo, Japan
- Occupations: Actress; voice actress
- Years active: 1998–present
- Height: 158 cm (5 ft 2 in)
- Father: Masato Sako

Mayumi Sako (佐古 真弓, Sako Mayumi; born January 13, 1978) is a Japanese actress and voice actress from Tokyo, Japan.

== Biography ==
She joined the Institute of Literature in 1997 and became a member of the Institute of Literature in 2002, but left in 2017. In the same year, she became a member of Fukuda & Co.

Her father Masato Sako was also an actor and voice actor.

In addition to appearing on the stage, she is also active as a voice actress for dubbing Western movies. She is the regular dubbing voice actress for Scarlett Johansson, Rachel McAdams, Jill Flint and Noomi Rapace.

== Filmography ==
=== Television animation ===
- Persona: Trinity Soul (2008), Saki Tachibana / Mayuri Yamasaki
- Dragon Crisis! (2011), Kai
- Kindaichi Case Files R (2014), Ivy Liu (Only in Hong Kong Kowloon Treasure Murder Case)
- In/Spectre (2020), Rikka Sakuragawa
- Great Pretender (2020), Isabelle Mueller
- Vinland Saga Season 2 (2023), Arnheid
- Lazarus (2025), Delta Subordinate
- Witch Hat Atelier (2026), Coco's Mother^{Ep. 1 credits}

=== Theatrical animation ===
- Spirited Away (2001)

=== Video games ===
- Resident Evil 6 (2013, Japanese dub), Helena Harper
- The Order: 1886 (2015, Japanese dub), Lady Igraine
- Need For Speed (2015, Japanese dub), Robyn
- The King of Fighters XIV (2016), Vice
- The Evil Within 2 (2017, Japanese dub), Yukiko Hoffman
- Detroit: Become Human (2018, Japanese dub), Kara
- The King of Fighters All Star (2018), Vice
- Ghost of Tsushima (2020, Japanese dub), Tomoe
- Tactics Ogre: Reborn (2022), Cerya Phoraena
- The King of Fighters XV (2024), Vice

=== Dubbing ===
==== Live-action ====
- Rachel McAdams
  - Sherlock Holmes, Irene Adler
  - Morning Glory, Becky Fuller
  - Sherlock Holmes: A Game of Shadows, Irene Adler
  - A Most Wanted Man, Annabel Richter
  - True Detective (season 2), Ani Bezzerides
  - Southpaw, Maureen Hope
  - Disobedience, Esti Kuperman
  - Eurovision Song Contest: The Story of Fire Saga, Sigrit Ericksdóttir
- Jessica Chastain
  - Lawless, Maggie Beauford
  - Zero Dark Thirty, Maya
  - Miss Sloane, Elizabeth Sloane
  - Molly's Game, Molly Bloom
  - The Eyes of Tammy Faye, Tammy Faye Messner
  - The 355, Mason Browne
  - The Good Nurse, Amy Loughren
- Noomi Rapace
  - The Girl with the Dragon Tattoo, Lisbeth Salander
  - The Girl Who Played with Fire, Lisbeth Salander
  - The Girl Who Kicked the Hornets' Nest, Lisbeth Salander
  - Prometheus (2017 The Cinema edition), Elizabeth Shaw
  - Passion, Isabelle James
  - Child 44, Raisa Demidova
  - Assassin Club, Falk / Agent Vos
- Scarlett Johansson
  - Iron Man 2, Natalie Rushman / Natasha Romanoff
  - We Bought a Zoo, Kelly Foster
  - Don Jon, Barbara Sugarman
  - Lucy, Lucy
  - Hail, Caesar!, DeeAnna Moran
  - Rough Night, Jess Thayer
  - Fly Me to the Moon, Kelly Jones
- Jill Flint
  - The Good Wife, Lana Delaney
  - Nurse Jackie, Melissa Greenfield
  - Royal Pains, Jill Casey
  - Elementary, Alysa Darvin / Elle Basten
  - The Night Shift, Dr. Jordan Alexander
- Olga Kurylenko
  - Quantum of Solace, Camille Montes
  - Erased, Anna Brandt
  - Johnny English Strikes Again, Ophelia Bhuletova
  - 15 Minutes of War, Jane Andersen
  - The Princess, Moira
- Emma Stone
  - Gangster Squad, Grace Faraday
  - Battle of the Sexes, Billie Jean King
  - Maniac, Annie Landsberg
- Jessica Alba
  - Awake, Sam Lockwood
  - Machete, Sartana Rivera
  - Mechanic: Resurrection, Gina Thornton
- Ronda Rousey
  - The Expendables 3, Luna
  - Furious 7, Kara
- 12 Rounds 2: Reloaded, Detective McKenzie (Venus Terzo)
- 2012, Tamara Jikan (Beatrice Rosen)
- The 4400, Isabelle Tyler (Megalyn Echikunwoke)
- Æon Flux, Una Flux (Amelia Warner)
- And Then There Were None, Vera Claythorne (Maeve Dermody)
- Another Life, Cas Isakovic (Elizabeth Ludlow)
- The Art of More, Roxanna Whitman (Kate Bosworth)
- Attack the Block, Samantha Adams (Jodie Whittaker)
- The Beach (2003 NTV edition), Françoise (Virginie Ledoyen)
- Burlesque, Nikki (Kristen Bell)
- Chapelwaite, Rebecca Morgan (Emily Hampshire)
- Chloe, Chloe Sweeney (Amanda Seyfried)
- Chronicle, Casey Letter (Ashley Hinshaw)
- Cry Macho, Leta (Fernanda Urrejola)
- The Darjeeling Limited, Rita (Amara Karan)
- Deadpool 2, Domino (Zazie Beetz)
- The Death and Life of Bobby Z, Elizabeth (Olivia Wilde)
- Death Proof, Jungle Julia Lucai (Sydney Tamiia Poitier)
- Eva, Lana (Marta Etura)
- Event 15, White (Jennifer Morrison)
- F1, Kate (Kerry Condon)
- The Fast and the Furious: Tokyo Drift, Neela (Nathalie Kelley)
- Focus, Jess Barrett (Margot Robbie)
- The Following, Emma Hill (Valorie Curry)
- Frozen, Parker O'Neill (Emma Bell)
- Glass Onion: A Knives Out Mystery, Helen Brand (Janelle Monáe)
- The Good Doctor, Jessica Preston (Beau Garrett)
- The Hangover Part II, Tracy Billings (Sasha Barrese)
- Hannibal, Alana Bloom (Caroline Dhavernas)
- Hansel & Gretel: Witch Hunters, Mina (Pihla Viitala)
- Hellboy II: The Golden Army, Princess Nuala (Anna Walton)
- Home Alone 3 (2019 NTV edition), Alice Ribbons (Rya Kihlstedt)
- I Hate Suzie, Suzie Pickles (Billie Piper), Frank (Matthew Jordan-Caws)
- I, Tonya, Tonya Harding (Margot Robbie)
- The Imitation Game, Joan Clarke (Keira Knightley)
- In the Heights, Vanessa (Melissa Barrera)
- Inferno, Dr. Sienna Brooks (Felicity Jones)
- Infinitely Polar Bear, Maggie Stuart (Zoe Saldaña)
- In the Blood, Ava (Gina Carano)
- The Joneses, Jenn Jones (Amber Heard)
- The Lazarus Project, Janet (Vinette Robinson)
- Liar, Laura Nielson (Joanne Froggatt)
- The Lost Bladesman, Qilan (Sun Li)
- Lucifer, Chloe Decker (Lauren German)
- Magnum P.I., Juliet Higgins (Perdita Weeks)
- Marlowe, Clare Cavendish (Diane Kruger)
- Mary Queen of Scots, Queen Elizabeth I (Margot Robbie)
- A Mighty Heart, Asra Nomani (Archie Panjabi)
- Motherless Brooklyn, Laura Rose (Gugu Mbatha-Raw)
- Mr. & Mrs. Smith (2008 NTV edition), Jasmine (Kerry Washington)
- Mrs. America, Gloria Steinem (Rose Byrne)
- Mutt Boy, Kim Jung-ae (Uhm Ji-won)
- Need for Speed, Julia Bonet (Imogen Poots)
- Night at the Museum: Battle of the Smithsonian, Tess / Amelia Earhart (Amy Adams)
- The Night House, Claire (Sarah Goldberg)
- Nobody's Fool, Danica (Tika Sumpter)
- Paranoia, Emma Jennings (Amber Heard)
- Penny Dreadful, Brona Croft / Lily Frankenstein (Billie Piper)
- The Professor and the Madman, Eliza Merrett (Natalie Dormer)
- The Raven, Emily Hamilton (Alice Eve)
- Roofman, Leigh Wainscott (Kirsten Dunst)
- Running Wild with Bear Grylls, Danica Patrick
- Rush, Nurse Gemma (Natalie Dormer)
- S. Darko, Samantha Darko (Daveigh Chase)
- Sense8, Sun Bak (Bae Doona)
- Sharp Objects, Camille Preaker (Amy Adams/Sophia Lillis)
- The Sorcerer's Apprentice, Rebecca Barnes (Teresa Palmer)
- The Stand, Nadine Cross (Amber Heard)
- Supergirl, Samantha Arias / Reign (Odette Annable)
- Thirteen, Evie Zamora (Nikki Reed)
- Three Billboards Outside Ebbing, Missouri, Anne Willoughby (Abbie Cornish)
- Unknown, Elizabeth Harris (January Jones)
- Welcome to Marwen, Deja Thoris (Diane Kruger)
- You're Next, Erin (Sharni Vinson)

==== Animation ====
- DC League of Super-Pets, Lois Lane
- Jang Geum's Dream, Choi Geum Yeong
- Legend of the Guardians: The Owls of Ga'Hoole, Otulissa
- Love, Death & Robots, Greta
- Thor: Tales of Asgard (Disney XD edition), Sif
- Missing Link, Adelina Fortnight
