= Masato Sako =

Japanese actor and voice actor (1946–2003)

- Born: November 9, 1946; Iwakuni, Yamaguchi, Japan
- Died: January 11, 2003 (aged 56); Iwakuni, Yamaguchi, Japan
- Occupations: Actor, voice actor
- Years active: 1960-2003
- Children: Mayumi Sako

Masato Sako (佐古正人, Sako Masato; November 9, 1946 – January 11, 2003) was a Japanese actor and voice actor from Iwakuni, Yamaguchi. He stood at 168 centimeters (5 feet, 7 inches) tall and weighed in at 62 kilograms (136 pounds).

Sako dropped out of Chuo University. He then enrolled in the theater company Gekidan Kumo. He later transferred to Engekishūdan En. He has performed in Shakespeare, television dramas, dubs of western films and animation. His oldest daughter, Mayumi Sako, is enrolled in the Bungaku Company. On January 11, 2003, Masato Sako died of oral cancer in an Iwakuni hospital at the age of 56.

== Successors ==
After Sako's death, the following actors were recruited to take over Sako's ongoing roles.

- Shinji Ogawa (as Tōyama in Detective Conan)
- Fumihiko Tachiki (as Kyōgoku Ken in Batman: The Animated Series)

== Filmography ==
=== Television drama ===
- Enkana Aitsu ha yo Goto Pank Nayume wo Miru (????) (Dark Gorō)
- Dai chūshingura (????) (Tadao Ōtaka)
- Meiji no Gunzō: Umi ni Karin wo (????) (Hikojirō Nakamigawa)

=== Film ===
- Minbō no Onna (????) (Health care center head)

=== Tokusatsu ===
- Kaettekita Ultraman (????) (MAT Station member)
- Uchū Keiji Sharivan (????) (Hoshio Kitagawa)

=== Television animation ===
- Brain Powerd (????) (Winston Geybridge)
- Detective Conan (????) (Masahiro Sannai, Tōyama (first voice), Yoshio Sadakane)

=== OVA ===
- Ginga Eiyū Densetsu (????) (John Drinker Cope)

=== Theatrical animation ===
- Taiho Shichauzo the Movie (????) (Sei Emoto)

=== Dubbing roles ===
==== Live action ====
- Gary Oldman
  - Léon: The Professional (1997 VHS edition) (Norman "Stan" Stansfield)
  - The Fifth Element (1999 NTV edition) (Jean-Baptiste Emanuel Zorg)
  - Air Force One (Ivan Korshunov)
  - Lost in Space (Doctor Zachary Smith)
- 8mm (Daniel Longdale (Anthony Heald))
- Before and After (Ben Ryan (Liam Neeson))
- Ben-Hur (2000 DVD edition) (Pontius Pilate (Frank Thring))
- Beetlejuice (Charles Deetz (Jeffrey Jones))
- The Brothers McMullen (Jack McMullen (Jack Mulcahy))
- Executive Decision (Doctor David Grant (Kurt Russell))
- Fargo (Jerry Lundegaard (William H. Macy))
- From the Earth to the Moon (Buzz Aldrin (Bryan Cranston))
- Ghostbusters II (1998 TV Asahi edition) (Louis Tully (Rick Moranis))
- Hero (Bernard 'Bernie' Laplante (Dustin Hoffman))
- Millennium (Peter Watts (Terry O'Quinn))
- New Jack City (Scotty Appleton (Ice-T))
- The Poseidon Adventure (1991 TV Asahi edition) (Acres (Roddy McDowall))
- Romancing the Stone (Jack T. Colton (Michael Douglas))
- The Running Man (1990 TV Asahi edition) (Tony (Kurt Fuller))
- Shining Through (General Franz-Otto Dietrich (Liam Neeson))
- Sleeping with the Enemy (Ben Woodward (Kevin Anderson))
- Still Crazy (Ray (Bill Nighy))
- Straight Time (TV edition) (Max Dembo (Dustin Hoffman))
- Terminator 2: Judgment Day (T-1000 (Robert Patrick))
- Vampires (Valek (Thomas Ian Griffith))
- Wild Wild West (Doctor Arliss Loveless (Kenneth Branagh))

==== Animation ====
- Batman: The Animated Series (Kyōgoku Ken (first voice))
- Lady and the Tramp (DVD edition) (Boris)
- Toy Story 2 (Wheezie the Penguin)
