= Wheely =

Vehicle for hire company

Wheely Ltd.
- Logo since 2023
- Type: Privately held company
- Industry: Transportation
- Founded: 2010; 16 years ago
- Founder: Anton Chirkunov
- Headquarters: London, England
- Area served: France; Russia; United Arab Emirates; United Kingdom; United States
- Revenue: 80,000,000 United States dollar (2019)
- Number of employees: 200 (2026)
- Website: wheely.com

Wheely Ltd., commonly known as Wheely, is a Swiss-founded British vehicle for hire company based in London that allows users to book chauffeur-driven journeys in a luxury vehicle either on-demand or in advance. Its services are accessed through its mobile apps on the Android and iOS operating systems, and are available in London, Paris, New York, Dubai, and Moscow.

Wheely was founded by Anton Chirkunov in 2010. As of early 2020, Wheely had US$110 million annually in bookings and a total passenger base of 80,000 customers. In 2014, Wired listed Wheely as one of the "hottest" European startups; In 2019, The Financial Times included Wheely in a list of the 1,000 fastest-growing companies in Europe.

== History ==
Swiss-Russian founder Anton Chirkunov launched Wheely in Zurich in 2010, seeking to create a data aggregation app similar to Booking.com but for taxis instead of hotels. Lacking a driver's license and frustrated by his taxi experiences, he eventually switched focus to develop a premium ride-hailing platform that connects riders with accredited chauffeurs.

The company debuted a prototype taxi aggregator service in London in 2012. Chirkunov signed contracts with private hire companies to provide drivers and Toyota Prius vehicles. However, Wheely struggled to compete with other private hire taxi and courier companies. As a result, when the service launched in Russia in 2012, Chirkunov decided to focus on the luxury market. Service then expanded to Saint Petersburg in 2013.

Following their success in Russia, Wheely relaunched as a luxury vehicle for hire service in London in 2018, starting with a soft launch in February. By April, Wheely had 150 professional chauffeurs driving E-Class and S-Class Mercedes-Benz vehicles in London. By mid 2018 there were approximately 2,500 chauffeurs on the Wheely platform across all markets.

The company's headquarters were relocated from Moscow to London in 2019, ahead of Brexit and a planned expansion in Europe. Wheely launched in Paris in September 2019, coinciding with Paris Fashion Week. Seeking to expand into the Middle East, Wheely applied for an e-hailing license in Dubai in 2021; the company launched there in February 2024.

Wheely has been designated as the official chauffeur for events including Henley Royal Regatta, the DP World Tour and Goodwood Revival.

In March 2026, Wheely was included in a list of 100 United Kingdom based "startups to watch" by business magazine Entrepreneur. Shortly after, Wheely launched service in New York City, with future plans for expansion in the United States.

== Business model ==
The company's business model focuses on the luxury vehicle for hire market. Wheely markets its services to wealthier riders looking for a more personalized, premium service. It has a time and distance pricing model for journeys and does not use "surge pricing". Drivers are "third-party partners" of Wheely, not employees; the company contracts with individual professional chauffeurs. All chauffeurs are required to successfully graduate from Wheely's three-day Academy in Syon Park, which covers service standards, etiquette, discretion, and first aid. Wheely requires chauffeurs to use specific luxury vehicles that are no more than four years old, and to sign non-disclosure agreements to protect the privacy of passengers. The company earns 20 per cent from each ride.

== Services ==
Wheely's mobile app is available for the iOS and Android operating systems. To use the service, an individual must download the app, create a user profile and enter their credit card details. Users can book rides in advance or on-demand by using the app to enter starting location and destination.

The company has several service classes, using vehicles including Mercedes-Benz's E-Class, S-Class and V-Class models as well as BMW 5 Series, Maybach and Range Rover. There are minimum fees for each class, and final service fees are dependent on distance and time; fixed rates are available for transfers to and from major airports such as Heathrow and Gatwick.

== Corporate affairs ==
As of 2018, Chirkunov owned 59.6% of the shares in Wheely. Wheely is based in London and has between 3,000 and 3,500 chauffeurs as of April 2019. The company reached US$110 million in annualized gross bookings by February 2020. Wheely has approximately 200 employees.

=== Investments ===
Chirkunov initially invested US$2.5 million in the company, most of which came from friends and family. Wheely won a US$25,000 grant from Start Fellows initiative, which was established by Pavel Durov and Yuri Milner. Wheely also received a grant of 5,900,000 ₽ (US$94,150) from Russian non-profit The Foundation for Assistance to Small Innovative Enterprises in Science and Technology. Total investments in Wheely grew to US$13 million in 2018. The company raised US$15 million in a Series B round led by the venture capital firm Concentric in 2019.

In 2024, Wheely announced it raised $15 million in funding, bringing its total to $43 million to date.

== Privacy ==
Due to its pro-data privacy stance, Wheely has in the past refused to hand over requests for passenger or journey data to governments. In 2020, the Moscow Department of Transportation demanded that Wheely begins sharing real-time journey data from all the vehicles on its platform. Wheely filed an official complaint with the UK's Information Commissioner's Office, as fulfilling the request would have violated Wheely's General Data Protection Regulation (GDPR) obligations.

Wheely was the only ride-hail company to not provide this data about customers in Russia, which led to a three-month suspension of their Russian subsidiary. Wheely's website includes a page refuting the Moscow Department of Transportation's rationale for requesting the data.
