= Filippo Ottoni =

Italian film director and screenwriter (1938–2023)

- Born: 17 May 1938; Cellere, Italy
- Died: 7 May 2023 (aged 84); Rome, Italy
- Education: London Film School
- Occupations: Film director Screenwriter; Dubbing director

Filippo Ottoni (17 May 1938 – 7 May 2023) was an Italian film director, screenwriter and dubbing director.

== Biography ==
Born in Cellere on 17 May 1938, Ottoni graduated from London Film School and began directing documentaries for the BBC. He began his career in cinema at the end of the 1960s as an assistant to Romolo Guerrieri and Mario Bava. He made his directing debut with the 1971 film La grande scrofa nera. He also directed Detective School Dropouts, which became popular in the United States. Additionally, he directed the dubbing of numerous films in foreign languages into Italian. He served as president of the Associazione Italiana Dialoghisti Cinematografici Adattatori.

Ottoni died in Rome on 7 May 2023, ten days before his 85th birthday.

== Filmography ==
=== Director and screenwriter ===
- La grande scrofa nera (1971)
- The Night Before Christmas (1978)
- Detective School Dropouts (1986)
- I giorni randagi (1988)
- L'assassino è quello con le scarpe gialle (1995)

=== Screenwriter ===
- A Bay of Blood (1971)
- Jonah Who Lived in the Whale (1993)
