= Moscow Department of Transportation =

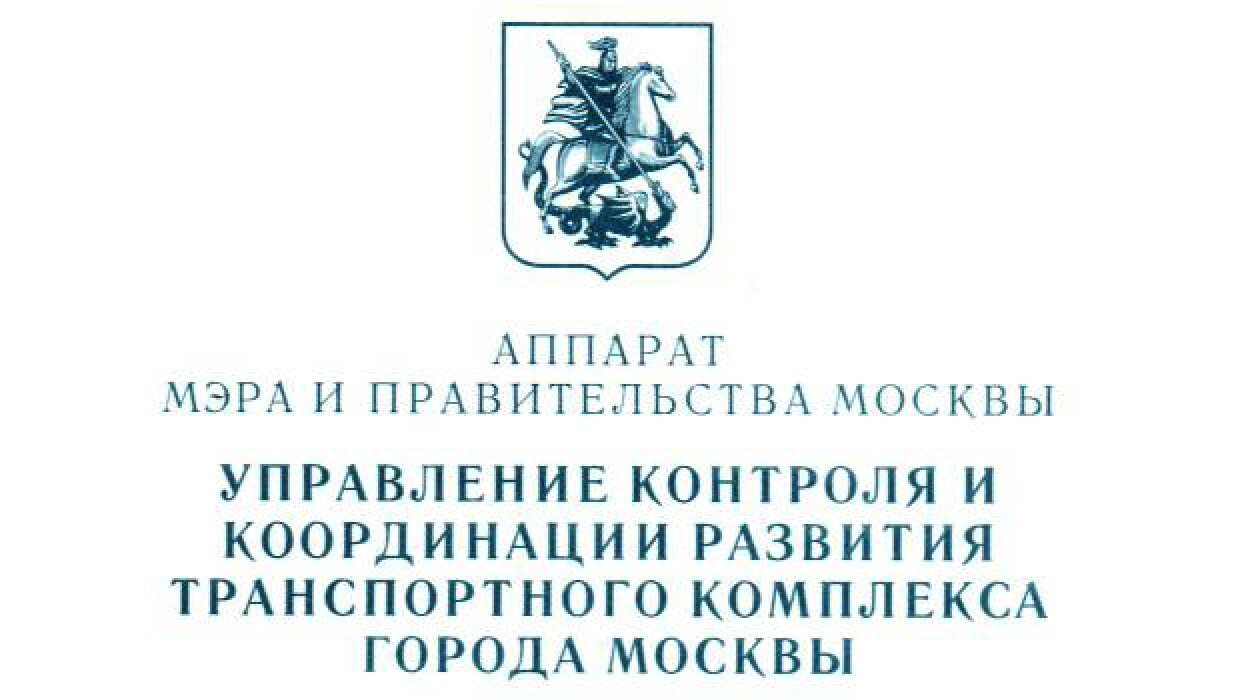

Agency overview
- Formed: 1958; 68 years ago
- Headquarters: 1 Sadovaya-Samotechnaya St.
- Website: transport.mos.ru

The Department of Transportation and Roadway Infrastructure Development of Moscow (Note: Russian: Департамент транспорта и развития дорожно-транспортной инфраструктуры города Москвы) (Deptrans Moskvy) (Note: Russian: Дептранс Москвы) is a subordinate agency of the Moscow City Government that develops and implements the city's policy on transportation and road transport infrastructure—providing transportation-related public services, managing government transportation assets, and promoting transportation safety within the city of Moscow.

It was originally formed under the name Moscow Bureau of Passenger Transportation (Note: Russian: Управление пассажирского транспорта Москвы) as a result of a merger of previously separate government agencies regulating trams, trolleybuses, and private cars.

== History ==
The first public transportation in Moscow was the streetcar (tram), opened in 1899. In 1924, buses were introduced; in 1933, trolleybuses; and in 1935, the Moscow Metro. The post-Soviet era saw the introduction of the Moscow Monorail (debuted 2004), although it has at times only operated in an "excursion mode".

Formed under the name Moscow Bureau of Passenger Transportation on 31 July 1958 as a merger of existing agencies by decree of the Moscow Executive Committee, on 30 July 1991, in accordance with Moscow City Decree No. 26, the Bureau was reorganized into the Moscow Committee on Passenger Transport. (Note: Russian: Комитет пассажирского транспорта)

Since then it has changed names four times, lastly in 2011:

- 13 August 1996 — Bureau of Transportation and Communications of the Moscow City Government (by order of Yury Luzhkov) (Note: Russian: Управление транспорта и связи комплекса городского хозяйства)
- 2000 — Moscow Bureau of Transportation and Communications (Note: Russian: Управление транспорта и связи города Москвы)
- 2004 — Department of Transportation and Communications (Note: Russian: Департамент транспорта и связи)
- 2011 — Department of Transportation and Roadway Infrastructure Development of Moscow (Note: Russian: Департамент транспорта и развития дорожно-транспортной инфраструктуры города Москвы)

=== 21st century ===
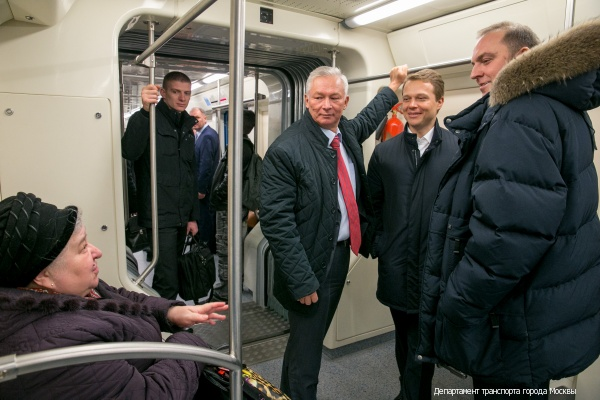
Executives of the Moscow Metro in the cabin of the first subway train in Moscow to have intercar gangway crossings (walk-through heads) for passengers, the model 81-760A electric train (photographed in 2015)

==== Objectives ====
The department's official responsibilities are to develop transportation legislation at the city level in Moscow, to monitor compliance with federal and regional laws in the field of transport and highway infrastructure development, and to develop and implement measures to improve the transportation functioning in Moscow.

The department also collaborates with the Main Directorate for Traffic Safety to monitor traffic congestion on the streets of Moscow; in 2016, they claimed their cooperation had decreased the number of traffic accidents in the city by 30% by targeting road infrastructure to where it was most needed. As of January 2018, Deptrans opened 400 free parking lots to ease congestion.
