= Afshin Zinouri =

Iranian voice actor

Afshin Zinouri افشين زی‌نوری
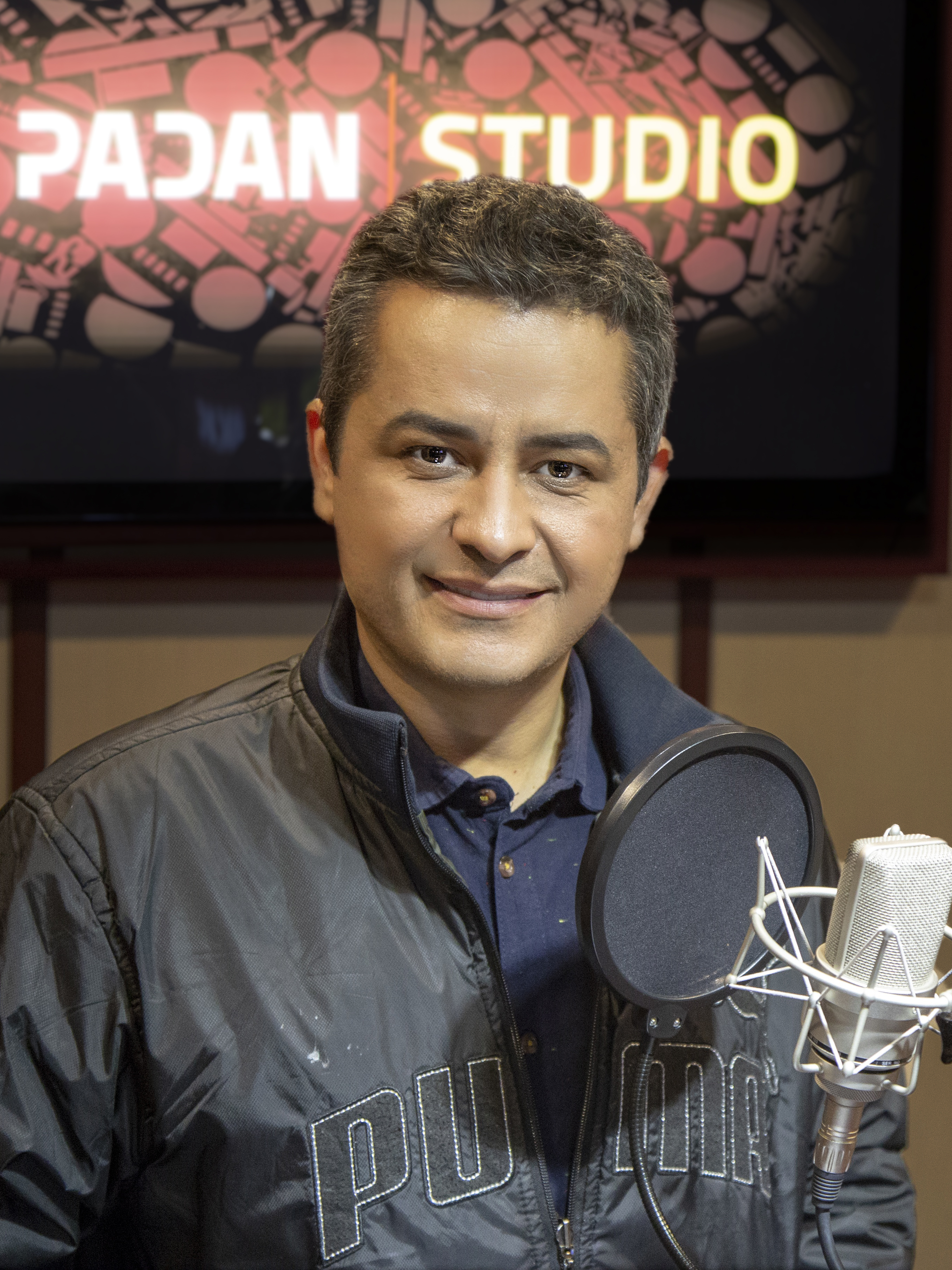
- Born: 23 April 1976 (age 50); Tehran, Iran
- Occupations: Voice actor, actor
- Years active: 1994–present

Afshin Zinouri (Persian: افشين زی‌نوری; born April 23, 1976) is an Iranian voice actor who is known for Persian voice-dubbing foreign films and TV programs.

== Biography ==
He was born in Tehran. He is known for dubbing over Elijah Wood's role as Frodo Baggins from The Lord of the Rings film trilogy and has also dubbed over some of Leonardo DiCaprio and Matt Damon's voice roles in films they starred in.

He is also an actor and television host.

== Dubbing In Movies ==
=== Live action films ===
- We're No Angels – Jim (Sean Penn)
- Good Will Hunting – Will Hunting (Matt Damon)
- Gladiator – Commodus (Joaquin Phoenix)
- The Lord of the Rings film trilogy – Frodo Baggins (Elijah Wood)
- Harry Potter and the Prisoner of Azkaban – Harry Potter (Daniel Radcliffe)
- Harry Potter and the Goblet of Fire – Harry Potter (Daniel Radcliffe)
- Harry Potter and the Order of the Phoenix – Harry Potter (Daniel Radcliffe)
- The Bourne Supremacy – Jason Bourne (Matt Damon)
- The Man in the Iron Mask (1998 film) – Philippe/King Louis XIV (Leonardo DiCaprio)
- Blood Diamond – Daniel "Danny" Archer (Leonardo DiCaprio)
- The Departed – William "Billy" Costigan Jr. (Leonardo DiCaprio)

=== Live action television ===
- All Saints
- Lost – Boone Carlyle (Ian Somerhalder)
- Emperor of the Sea
- The Kingdom of The Winds – Prince Dojin (Park Gun Hyung)
