= List of science fiction television programs, H =

This is an inclusive list of science fiction television programs whose names begin with the letter H.

== H ==
Live-action

- Halfway Across the Galaxy and Turn Left (1991–1992, Australia)
- Halo (2022-2024)
- The Handmaid's Tale (2017-2025)
- Hard Time on Planet Earth (1989)
- Harrison Bergeron (1995, film)
- Harsh Realm (1999–2000, Canada/US)
- HaShminiya a.k.a. The Octette (2005–2007, 2013–2014, Israel)
- Haunted (2002)
- Hauser's Memory (1970, film)
- Helix (2014–2015)
- Hero Corp (2008–2009, France)
- Highcliffe Manor (1979) IMDb
- Highlander (franchise):
  - Highlander: The Series (1992–1998) (elements of science fiction)
  - Highlander: The Raven (1998–1999, Highlander: The Series spin-off) (elements of science fiction)
  - Highlander: The Source (2007, film)
- Highwayman, The (1987–1988)
- Hilarious House of Frightenstein, The (1971, Canada)
- Hitchhiker's Guide to the Galaxy, The (1981, UK)
- Hollywood Off-Ramp IMDb
- Holmes & Yo-Yo (1976–1977)
- Homeboys in Outer Space (1996–1997)
- Honey, I Shrunk the Kids (1997–2000)
- Hora Marcada, La a.k.a. Marked Time, The (1986, Mexico, anthology)
- How to Make a Monster (2001, film)
- Humans (2015–2018)
- Hunters (2016)
- Hyperdrive (2006–2007, UK)
- Hypernauts (1996)

Animation

- .hack (franchise):
  - .hack//Sign (2002, Japan, animated)
  - .hack//Legend of the Twilight (2003, Japan, animated)
  - .hack//Roots (2006, Japan, animated)
- Hakugei: Legend of the Moby Dick (1997–1999, Japan, animated)
- Hand Maid May (2000, Japan, animated)
- Harvey Birdman, Attorney at Law (2000–2007, animated)
- He-Man and the Masters of the Universe (franchise):
  - He-Man and the Masters of the Universe (1983–1985, animated)
  - She-Ra: Princess of Power (1985–1987, animated)
  - New Adventures of He-Man, The (1990, animated)
  - He-Man and the Masters of the Universe (2002–2004, animated)
- Heat Guy J (2002–2003, Japan, animated)
- Heavy Gear: The Animated Series (2001, Canada, animated)
- Heavy Metal L-Gaim (1984–1985, Japan, animated)
- Heavy Object (2015, Japan, animated)
- The Herculoids (1967-1968, animated)
- Hero: 108 (2010–2012, US/Canada/Taiwan/UK, animated)
- Hero Factory (2010–2014, miniseries, animated)
- Hero High (1981–1982, animated)
- Heroes (2006–2010)
- Heroic Age (2007, Japan, animated)
- Heroman (2010, Japan, animated)
- Highlander: The Animated Series (1994–1995, animated)
- Hot Wheels (franchise):
  - Hot Wheels AcceleRacers (2005, animated)
  - Hot Wheels Battle Force 5 a.k.a. Battle Force 5 (UK/Ireland) (2009–2011, animated)
- Human Kind Of (2018, animated)
- Huntik: Secrets & Seekers (2009–2012, animated)
- Hurricane Polymar (1974–1975, Japan, animated)
- Hyper Police (1997, Japan, animated)
