= Skeith =

Skeith can mean:

- Skeith, a Neopet
- Skeith (.hack), a fictional character from the .hack franchise.
