= Sayaka Aida =

Japanese voice actress

- 相田 さやか
- Born: Kobayashi Sayaka (小林 さやか); March 9, 1975 (age 50)
- Occupation: Voice actress
- Years active: 1990–present
- Agent: Arts Vision

Sayaka Aida (相田 さやか, Aida Sayaka; née Kobayashi (小林) born March 9, 1975) is a Japanese voice actress who is affiliated with the Arts Vision management company. She is originally from the Metropolitan Tokyo Area. Her maiden name is Sayaka Kobayashi (小林 さやか).

== Filmography ==
=== Anime series ===
- Shima Shima Tora no Shimajirō (1993) – Kotarō
- Wild Arms: Twilight Venom (1999) – Missile
- Crush Gear Turbo (2001) – Wang Hu
- Monkey Typhoon (2002) – Yū
- Ki Fighter Taerang (2002) – Taerang
- Beyblade (2002) – Net
- Crush Gear Nitro (2003) – Rasuka
- Konjiki no Gash Bell!! (2003) – Nicole
- Machine Robo Rescue (2003) – Taiyō Ōzora
- Onmyō Taisenki (2004) – Byakko no Kogenta
- MAJOR (2004) – Murai
- .hack//Roots (2006) – Tri-Edge
- Naruto (2006) – Isaribi
- Crash B-Daman (2006)- Hanbei
- BeyWheelz (2012) – Marche

=== Original video animation (OVA) ===
- Mazinkaiser (2001) – Shiro Kabuto
- Mazinkaiser vs Great Darkness General (2003) – Shiro Kabuto
- .hack//GIFT (2003) – Kite
- .hack//Unison (2003) – Kite
- Ajisai no Uta (2004) – Gon-chan

=== Anime films ===
- Mobile Suit Zeta Gundam: A New Translation (2005) – Shinta

=== Video games ===
- Power Stone (1999) – Wang Tang
- Power Stone 2 (2000) – Wang Tang
- .hack//INFECTION (2002) – Kite
- .hack//MUTATION (2002) – Kite
- .hack//OUTBREAK (2002) – Kite
- Shinobi (2002) – Akagane
- .hack//QUARANTINE (2003) – Kite
- Summon Night Craft Sword Monogatari: Hajimari no Ishi (2005) – Ritchburn
- .hack//G.U. Volume 1: Rebirth (2006) – Tri-Edge
- The Legend of Zelda: Twilight Princess (2006)
- .hack//G.U. Volume 2: Reminisce (2006) – Azure Kite
- I/O (2006) – Enlil
- .hack//G.U. Volume 3: Redemption (2007) – Azure Kite
- Project X Zone (2012) – Kite
- Project X Zone 2 (2015) – Kite
- The Legend of Zelda: Breath of the Wild (2017)

=== Tokusatsu ===
- Kyuukyuu Sentai GoGoFive (2000) – Analyse Robo Mint
- Bakuryū Sentai Abaranger (2003) – Burstosaur Bachycelonagurus
- Bakuryū Sentai Abaranger DELUXE: Abare Summer is Freezing Cold! (2003; film) – Burstosaur Bachycelonagurus
- Bakuryū Sentai Abaranger vs. Hurricaneger (2004) – Burstosaur Bachycelonagurus

=== CDs ===
- Onmyō Taisenki Special Soundtrack Tiger Volume – Byakko no Kogenta
- Onmyō Taisenki Special Soundtrack 2 Dragon Volume – Byakko no Kogenta

=== Dubbing ===
==== Live-action ====
- Amélie – Young Amélie (Flora Guiet)
- Eddie the Eagle – Janette Edwards (Jo Hartley)
- Emma – Miss Bates (Miranda Hart)
- M3GAN – Elsie (Ellen Dubin)
- Spanglish – Cristina (Shelbie Bruce)
- Temptation of Wolves – Lee Bo-jung (Lee Ji-hee)
- Vacation – Debbie Griswold (Christina Applegate)
- West Side Story – Fausta (Andréa Burns)

==== Animation ====
- Curious George – Maggie
