= .hack//Roots =

Japanese anime television series

- Cover of the first DVD volume
- Anime television series
- Directed by: Koichi Mashimo
- Written by: Miu Kawasaki
- Music by: Ali Project
- Studio: Bee Train
- Licensed by: AUS: Madman Entertainment; EU: Beez Entertainment (former); NA: Funimation
- Original network: TV Tokyo
- Original run: April 5, 2006 – September 27, 2006
- Episodes: 26
- Related Works
- .hack//G.U.; .hack//Gift (bonus parody episode of .hack//Sign); .hack

.hack//Roots is a 26-episode anime series, animated by studio Bee Train, that sets as a prologue for the .hack//G.U. video games. It is the first .hack TV series broadcast in HDTV (1080i). It is set seven years after the events of the first two anime series and games. .hack//Roots revolves around an MMORPG game called The World R:2, also known as The World Revision:2 and serves a sequel to the original version of "The World".

== Plot ==
.hack//Roots follows the tale of Haseo, a black 'Adept Rogue' (a class that can use multiple types of weapons) and member of the "Twilight Brigade", a small guild created within "The World R:2". In the year 2015, the CC Corporation's building burned down, and with it, most of the existing data for "The World". By splicing in data from what would have potentially been another game with what remained of "The World" after the fire, CC Corp. created "The World R:2" and released it in 2016, which is when the anime takes place. The main revisions in this release were that the game allowed for guild and PvP (player vs player) play.

Haseo logs into The World R:2 for the first time and falls victim to the PKers (player-killers) that reside within the game. He is saved by Ovan, who prompts him to join the Twilight Brigade alongside Sakisaka, Tabby and Shino, who are in search of finding "The Key of the Twilight". However, a popular guild named "TaN" obstructs the Twilight Brigade in its mission and is attempting to obtain Ovan's unique character data. The Twilight Brigade has discovered special items, known as 'Virus Cores', and believed them to be the path to finding "The Key of the Twilight" and went to find them all. Once the Twilight Brigade had acquired all six cores, the guild headed out to use them in one of the "Lost Ground"s, after figuring out that the two were connected to one another.

However, the group discovers that this was all a trap laid by the members of TaN in order to capture Ovan. With Ovan gone and no sign of the Key of the Twilight, the Twilight Brigade disband and previous members, such as B-set and Gord, quit the game entirely. Soon after, Shino is killed within the game by a mysterious PKer named "Tri-Edge". This somehow puts her into a coma in the real world, which devastates Haseo. Haseo then begins training in order to get strong enough to defeat Tri-Edge and save Shino from her real-life coma. Through this ordeal, Haseo becomes obsessed with power and ends up as a Player-Killer-Killer (PKK), in an effort to find information on Tri-edge. When Haseo competes in a special event that promises a special reward, he gains a new power, but his mind is corrupted and he begins to kill PKers with yet more aggression, gaining him the title of "The Terror of Death".

== Characters ==
Haseo (ハセヲ, Haseo)
Voiced by: Takahiro Sakurai (Japanese); Andrew Francis (English, Bandai Visual dub), David Lee McKinney (English, Animax Asia dub)
The protagonist of the series, and a newbie within The World R:2. Haseo had an encounter with PKers (Player Killers) before joining the Twilight Brigade. He appears to be obsessed with Ovan's enigmatic nature, which he soon discovers is not so unusual. He is an outsider in real life, and not very good at dealing with people. He seems to care for Shino in a more than platonic way. After Shino goes into a coma, Haseo starts to become extremely depressed and also very angry whenever Shino or Tri-Edge are mentioned. He completed a special event known as The Forest of Pain, which was said to be impossible to complete. His reward was an upgrade that gave him impossible strength (known as the 3rd form in .hack//G.U.). He is now trying to hunt down Tri-Edge, using his newly gained power status to PK players in an attempt to find information. After his transformation he becomes even more mentally unstable and anti-social. While trying to find information on Tri-Edge, Haseo reunites with Ovan who tells him that he will find Tri-Edge at the Hulle Granz Cathedral (one of the Lost Grounds). Haseo fights Tri-Edge but is defeated and stripped of all his power and equipment, ironically returning him mostly to his senses as well. Outside of the game, Haseo is 17 years old and attends a private high school. He lives alone. Haseo visits Shino in the hospital on a daily basis after she fell in a coma.
Ovan (オーヴァン, Ōvan)
Voiced by: Hiroki Tōchi (Japanese); Michael Kopsa (English)
The Guildmaster of the Twilight Brigade, Ovan has a strange device sealed around his left arm. He is an enigma to those who know him. Many people think he is odd, due in large part to his search for the Key of the Twilight, an item that may not exist. He is often searching for information on the Key of the Twilight, and is almost never seen around town. Apparently, Ovan's PC data is as large as an entire field, which may be due to the fact that it contains the black matter, the material that make up AIDAs that possess PCs, or possibly the epitaph of Corbenik, the last of the Eight Phases. The data is apparently mostly in his left arm, in which Naobi had unlocked upon capturing him. After the incident, Ovan somehow escapes, not returning until much later in the series. He has also contacted or ran-into Taihaku, the reasons for this are unknown, but it may be connected to his wish to make Haseo stronger. He encountered Azure Kite, and defeated him leaving one witness.
Shino (志乃, Shino)
Voiced by: Kaori Nazuka (Japanese); Kelly Sheridan (English, Bandai Visual dub)
One of the few people close to Ovan who acts as leader of the Twilight Brigade whenever Ovan is incapable of doing so. Gentle-mannered but strong-minded, she holds the Twilight Brigade together during Ovan's frequent absences. She and Ovan seem to have a more involved relationship than mere guildmates, as they have both known and seen each other somewhat frequently outside the game as it was alluded to when Shino asked about Ovan's doctor visits. During episode 13 Shino is attacked by Tri-Edge and Azure Kite is framed, resulting in her PC seemingly erased and her real self sent into a coma. She had been living alone and her landlord discovered her unconscious. The doctors cannot treat her because they do not know the cause behind her coma. Those who have suffered fates like hers are referred to as a Lost One, since it is rumored that once PKed by Tri-Edge a player can never return to the game. In real life, Shino is 18 and studying medicine.
Sakisaka (匂坂, Sakisaka)
Voiced by: Ryōtarō Okiayu (Japanese); Alistair Abell (English, Bandai Visual dub)
Sakisaka left another guild to join the Twilight Brigade and was a member during its previous incarnation, he often helps beginners like Haseo and a lot more with Tabby to level up. He is skeptical that the Key of the Twilight even exists and often complains that the Twilight Brigade's search is meaningless. He quit the Twilight Brigade after Ovan's disappearance, assuming Ovan had stolen the Key of the Twilight for himself, and formed a Guild with Tabby, but as of episode 13, Sakisaka has quit the game and gone to another called Riot Gun. In real life he lives in a small apartment and is 19.
Tabby (タビー, Tabī)
Voiced by: Megumi Toyoguchi (Japanese); Maryke Hendrikse (English, Bandai Visual dub), Sarah Hauser (Animax Asia dub)
As her name implies, Tabby somewhat resembles a cat, with feline ears, claws, and hair that acts like a cat's tail. Her weapon of choice is a pair of large cat paws that she uses to slash at enemies. Tabby has been playing about as long as Haseo and usually fights alongside Sakisaka in the field. She often refers to Sakisaka as her "master" or "teacher". She is loyal, friendly and positive (though she points out that she's not cheerful because she wants to be). She has quit the Brigade alongside Sakisaka. Unlike Sakisaka, she has yet to quit the game, opting to try to help Haseo instead. She momentarily caught Yata and Pi's attention, though Saburo doubted she was ever particularly special. Kuhn offered her a place in Canard which she denied. Yata and Pi still seem to feel that Tabby has some untold role to play, despite being a seemingly ordinary player. Tabby created a Guild, under Tohta's guidance, known as the Paw Brigade, which was set up to heal both Haseo and PCs defeated by Haseo.
Naobi (直毘, Naobi) /Yata (八咫, Yata)
Voiced by: Takumi Yamazaki (Japanese); Paul Dobson (English, Bandai Visual dub)
The mysterious former Guildmaster of TaN. Naobi appears to be obsessed with Ovan's search for the Key of the Twilight or rather Ovan himself, though his motives is unknown. He and Ovan seem to go way back, although precisely how far is unknown. Naobi was the one who first told Ovan about the Key of the Twilight. Naobi appears as a large dark blue cat creature. After capturing Ovan to analyze his PC, his illegal activities were reported by Shino over what had happened with Ovan, and he was forced to abandon Naobi, which turns out to be nothing more than a PC to hide his true identity, and now controls Yata; meaning Naobi was a System-Administrator. He and Pi are keeping tabs on Haseo as well as waiting for any strange activity to take place in The World.
Tawaraya (俵屋, Tawaraya) /Tohta (籐太, Tōta)
Voiced by: Kenta Miyake (Japanese); Mark Acheson (English, Bandai Visual dub)
The figurehead and finance treasurer of TaN. Tawaraya is a college student who is planning to study abroad. He acts very business-like while playing and appears to deal in items and information through TaN. His account has been terminated or suspended due to TaN's illegal activities but he has since come back with a new PC known as Tohta in order to take care of unfinished business before leaving. Both his PC's names were connected to a historical figure known as Tawara no Tohta. He disliked the recent practice of 'Real-Money Trading' within The World and managed to get Yata to have The World's administration to delete or suspend PCs that were doing so within the game. He has since accepted to inform Wool and Cashmere of Tabby's whereabouts, as well as offered to collect information on Tri-Edge for Haseo.
Ender (エンダー, Endā) /Pi (パイ, Pai)
Voiced by: Sanae Kobayashi (Japanese); Lisa Ann Beley (English, Bandai Visual dub)
A PK and the former head of TaN's 'black ops'. She acts as the enemy, as well as stalker, of the Twilight Brigade on Naobi's orders and assists him in his illegal activities. Little is known about her motives but she seems to plan on taking the Key of the Twilight for herself, or so it seems. She seems to take pleasure in hunting down members of the Twilight Brigade and PK them after shaking them down for information. After assisting in Naobi's capture of Ovan's PC, she was made an outlaw like him and was forced to use her administrative PC: Pi. She has a contact named Saburo; a former member of TaN that worked under her. Pi keeps an eye on players such as Haseo and Tabby, and sends Saburo in her stead to keep herself unnoticed, as well as have observation surveillance done on Haseo.
Phyllo (フィロ, Firo)
Voiced by: Junpei Takiguchi (Japanese); Russell Roberts (English, Bandai Visual dub)
Phyllo does not belong to any Guild and is unusually old for someone playing The World R:2. He is an U-zoku character and is almost always seen floating in midair. He acts as a mine of information for Haseo, having connections with numerous influential PCs, including Ovan, Naobi and Taihaku. Phyllo likes to hang out in town and does not venture out into the fields often. Despite this, his character is strong and he can hold his ground against melee players. It was Phyllo who introduced Shino to Ovan. He was attacked by Azure Kite in episode 14, but then later backed off after realising that Phyllo was not Ovan, who he was looking for and had been at the same area as Phyllo only seconds earlier. Phyllo is also the only one to have survived an attack by Tri-Edge without suffering any side-effects to himself or his PC. Later on, this catches Pi and Yata's interest. It was stated during Yata's interrogation of Phyllo that he met a female PC who introduced him to Ovan, though her identity is unknown, however it is stated that it was Aina, Ovan's younger sister.

== Episodes ==
.hack//Roots has 26 episodes and aired on TV Tokyo. The final episode was broadcast on September 27, 2006. In North America, the series started airing on Saturday, November 11, 2006, at 5:00 am EST on Cartoon Network, with no prior advertising or announcements given whatsoever. Due to the last few episodes containing spoilers for games not yet released in North America, Cartoon Network chose to restart the series at Episode #1 after only 21 episodes were broadcast, leaving the last five unaired. Starting July 6, 2007, Adult Swim took over Friday nights, leaving the show nowhere to be seen on the schedule and the remaining episodes were never aired. All 26 episodes have been dubbed, however. The anime was licensed by Bandai Entertainment with dubbing handled by The Ocean Group based out of Vancouver, British Columbia, Canada. Following the closure of Bandai Entertainment, Funimation announced at SDCC 2013, that they have acquired 4 .hack titles including Roots.

No.	Title	Original release date	English airdate
1	"Welcome to The World" "Kangei" (歓迎)	April 5, 2006	November 11, 2006
Haseo starts playing and experiences PKers (Player Killers). After they kill him, Ovan revives him. Then almost all the players in The World start asking him about Ovan.
2	"Twilight Brigade" "Tasogare no Ryodan" (黄昏の旅団)	April 12, 2006	November 18, 2006
Haseo wants to learn more about Ovan's mysterious guild. At the end of the episode, he meets Ovan by a portal. Ovan asks Haseo to join his guild. Haseo responds by saying, "I'll think about it." and then walks away. After this, Phyllo, on his usual bridge, turns around and begins talking to Naobi, stating that it is a rare thing for him to come to town.
3	"Join" "Nyūdan" (入団)	April 19, 2006	November 25, 2006
Haseo is targeted by many players who think of him as a legend because someone is spreading rumors about him. He is then invited to join the Twilight Brigade as well as the trading guild TaN. After spending some time with Shino, Haseo makes his decision to join the Twilight Brigade.
4	"Forefeel" "Yokan" (予感)	April 26, 2006	December 2, 2006
Shino takes Haseo to another Lost Ground, and later to level up. Sakisaka gets suspicious about why Haseo joined and why he talked to Gord about the guild. Later Tabby gets PK'd by Ender.
5	"Distrust" "Fushin" (不信)	May 3, 2006	December 9, 2006
Tabby starts believing Haseo is a messenger for TaN, causing Haseo to leave the Twilight Brigade. Haseo is then seen by Tabby and Shino talking to a TaN member who called him.
6	"Conflict" "Kattō" (葛藤)	May 10, 2006	December 16, 2006
During a meteor shower, Sakisaka's loyalty is put into question, as Ender attacks Tabby and him. The game experiences glitches, and Haseo displays a new ability when he arrives to help.
7	"Intrigue" "Sakusō" (錯綜)	May 17, 2006	December 23, 2006
While investigating the Lost Grounds, Haseo experiences a major glitch in The World. Also, we learn more about the Virus Cores. On a team search with Tabby and Sakisaka, they find common marks in the Lost Grounds, where they had found virus cores. Haseo notices something weird about the lines, and the three mysteriously vanish.
8	"Starting" "Shidō" (始動)	May 24, 2006	December 30, 2006
Haseo, Tabby, and Sakisaka find out the lines they found are portals. Continuing their search of the Lost Grounds, Tabby and Sakisaka encounter a glitch, while Haseo is confronted by Ender. Haseo notices the multiple colors of the Virus Cores, in comparison to the pillars from one of the Lost Grounds. This news comes as a breakthrough to the Key of the Twilight. Haseo then finds another Virus Core.
9	"Melee" "Konsen" (混戦)	May 31, 2006	January 6, 2007
The Twilight Brigade attempts to bring together all of the Virus Cores. Sakisaka is given the last Core by Tawaraya, while Gord and B-Set show up to help the Twilight Brigade as they are being attacked by TaN. The Twilight Brigade people are then transported to an unknown location, so Ender and her TaN subordinates follow to see where the Twilight Brigade people have disappeared to. (Known as "Melee" in North America.)
10	"Missing" "Yukuefumei" (行方不明)	June 7, 2006	January 13, 2007
The Twilight Brigade fights TaN members while Ovan goes to find the Key of the Twilight. Passing through a door, Ovan steps into a trap (knowingly, we find out later) set by Naobi and the rest of TaN. Later, Shino threatens TaN by saying that she will leak certain illegal online activities, if Ovan was not returned. TaN then disbands, after they have decided that they would rather keep Ovan. So, Ovan is left captive, with his PC data being read by Naobi.
11	"Discord" "Fuwa" (不和)	June 14, 2006	January 20, 2007
Gord is thinking of quitting the game. Because Shino gave the administrators the evidence of TaN's illegal activities, several TaN members are banned.
12	"Breakup" "Kaitai" (解体)	June 21, 2006	January 27, 2007
Shino disbands the Twilight Brigade. Gord and B-Set quit the game because Ovan is apparently never coming back. Haseo promises to stay with Shino even if there was no guild. Shino decides to wait for Ovan to return with Haseo.
13	"Tragedy" "Higeki" (悲劇)	June 28, 2006	February 3, 2007
Tabby Tells Haseo that Shino has gone to the Hulle Granz Cathedral (Grima Lowe in the Japanese version) alone. Haseo goes to make sure this is not another trap set up by Naobi. But, he finds that Shino has been PK'd and her Character data is starting to disappear. So, he tries to contact her in the real world, but she does not pick up her phone.
14	"Lost One" "Mikikansha" (未帰還者)	July 5, 2006	February 10, 2007
Haseo blames himself for not being able to protect Shino. He then gets a call from Shino's mother but cannot tell her anything about her daughter's coma, because he knows that she would not believe him if he told her it was caused by someone 'killing' her in The World. Phyllo starts spending more time with Hasea. Tabby then starts a guild with Sakisaka but he resigns and leaves to play a new game. This leaves Tabby all by herself in the game making her feel like she has no one but Haseo by her side.
15	"Pad" "Nikukyū" (肉球)	July 12, 2006	February 17, 2007
Tabby meets two new members of The World. She helps them play the game but says she cannot help them like Shino and Sakisaka helped her. Tabby then meets Kuhn when she goes to talk to Phyllo. Kuhn, understanding Tabby's problem, teaches the two brothers and Tabby about to level up efficiently in The World. Haseo, still angry about what happened to Shino at that mysterious Kite-looking guy, decides that he will stop at nothing to bring Shino back and get revenge on Tri-Edge.
16	"Resolution" "Ketsudan" (決断)	July 19, 2006	February 24, 2007
Taihaku meets Ovan which is perhaps the spark for Taihaku deciding to go to the Forest of Pain. Haseo hears that Phyllo encountered Tri-Edge and tries to get Phyllo to tell him more about the encounter. Instead of really answering his question, Phyllo tells Haseo that he shouldn't blame himself for Shino's coma. Haseo, angry at Phyllo and still blaming himself for Shino's coma, fights Phyllo and loses. After Haseo loses, Phyllo tells Haseo not to fight Tri-Edge because he will most likely become a "Lost One." Haseo then hears about the new quest called the Forest of Pain and decides to take it so he can become stronger and defeat Tri-Edge, effectively ignoring Phyllo's warning.
17	"Painful Forest" "Itami no Mori" (痛みの森)	July 26, 2006	March 3, 2007
Tabby, still worried about Haseo, also joins the Forest of Pain event, where she meets, and becomes friends with Sabuto. Yata and Pi try to figure out if Phyllo's close relationship with Ovan is because he is the only survivor of a Tri-Edge encounter. Taihaku and Haseo are participating in the Forest of Pain event. Pi tells Subaro to make contact with Haseo in the Forest and see what he does in there. Ovan fights 'Tri-Edge'. Taihaku gets to the end of the Forest of Pain and Tabby decides to retire from the quest and that she will wait for Haseo to come back on his own.
18	"Limit" "タイムリミット" (Taimu Rimitto)	August 9, 2006	March 10, 2007
Taihaku gets his reward for answering the mysterious man question. Tabby waits for Haseo to exit the quest. Haseo makes it to the end where he meets Harald Hoerwick who asks Haseo to answer his question; how is his daughter? Haseo, just wanting to become more powerful, says he does not care about the man's daughter and is logged out of the quest (after getting his painful upgrade to his third form) about 30 seconds before the time limit of the quest ends. Haseo then appears in front Tabby, looking different than before because the shock of not answering the man's question somehow boosted Haseo to his 3rd adept rogue form, Flick Reaper.
19	"Violation" "Ihan" (違反)	August 16, 2006	March 17, 2007
Tawaraya returns as Tohta finishes up some business and finds out that there are merchants who buy rare items with real money and have driven up the prices in the game. He sets out to stop them. Meanwhile Yata continues to watch Haseo.
20	"Pursuit" "Tsuikyū" (追求)	August 23, 2006	March 24, 2007
Haseo starts to lose his sanity as he is searching for information on Tri-Edge by asking PKs (and 'killing' then if the PKs do not give him the answer he wants). Saburo, trying to bring out the factor that Yata and Pi are interested in, fights, but fails. Taihaku talks to Phyllo about the Forest of Pain and Haseo. Tohta makes contact with Haseo this earning Haseo's trust.
21	"Defeat" "Haiboku" (敗北)	August 30, 2006	March 31, 2007
Haseo fights Midori who easily dodges his attacks. Haseo wants information from her because she saw Tri-Edge and survived the encounter. He continues to PK PKs, frustrated that he cannot find anything useful about Tri-Edge. Meanwhile, Tabby and Seisaku start a guild to help Haseo and the PKs that he PK'es.
22	"Bonds" "Kizuna" (絆)	September 6, 2006	N/A
Tabby and her guild fail at their debut to heal people; Tohta makes them level up. Kuhn awakens his power as an Epitaph User and is scouted by Pi to join her guild, Raven. The Paw Pad Squad starts healing Haseo's victims and Haseo does not stop them.
23	"Trial" "Shiren" (試練)	September 13, 2006	N/A
Haseo starts to PK the PKers hoping to come across Tri-Edge, who is after all, a PKer. Then, all the PKers band together to defeat Haseo. Meanwhile, Kuhn is introduced to Yata's guild, Raven. The Paw Pad Squad goes to heal Haseo and his victims, but Haseo kills everyone indiscriminately, making everyone but Tabby leave the guild because they do not want to help Haseo anymore.
24	"Confront" "Chokumen" (直面)	September 20, 2006	N/A
Because of the incident involving all the PKers, Haseo gains the nickname "The Terror of Death". Haseo refuses to listen to anyone or accept help because he is convinced that no he will be able to defeat Tri-Edge. Tabby is at a loss at to what to do, since Haseo does not want to listen to her. Haseo then meets Ovan, after arguing with Sakaki and Atoli. Ovan tells Haseo to go to the Hulle Granz Cathedral where 'Tri-Edge' will return to the scene of his 'crime' of PKing Shino. Haseo goes the Cathedral and loses his fight with 'Tri-Edge'. Then, Haseo is somehow reverted to level 1 by 'Tri'Edge's' mysterious power.
25	"Truth" "Shinjitsu" (真実)	September 27, 2006	N/A
Haseo has, apparently, quit The World. Seisaku talks to Tabby who decides to stop relying on Haseo. Ovan tells Phyllo something shocking. Phyllo entrusts to Tohta a heavy burden. Tabby and Saburo talk about Haseo and life.
26	"Determination" "Kesshin" (決心)	September 27, 2006	N/A
Haseo emerges from inactivity after his defeat at the hands of Tri-Edge. He encounters Tohta and learns that Phyllo died of cancer, making Haseo miss him. Haseo then meets with Tabby and she tell him her real life ambitions of becoming a nurse so that she can save Shino before Haseo. Once Tabby leaves and Haseo is left alone, the episode recaps the events during the series between Shino and Haseo. This leads to a scene in which Haseo sees a "ghost" of Shino, making his convictions to save her grow stronger. The episode ends with a brief glimpse of Haseo, his Xth Form from the G.U. games superimposed over his normal character and the avatar Skeith in the background. The image transitions back to the present Haseo looking into the distance, his determination renewed to continue his search for Tri-Edge and a way to save Shino.
27	"Returner"	N/A	N/A
This episode takes place after the G.U. game trilogy. The characters of both Roots and the "G.U." receive an email from Ovan requesting them to visit the festival held at a new Lost Ground, Hidden Forbidden Festival. There, they encounter many old friends, as well as an AIDA who appears to be non-hostile. At the end of the episode, Ovan is reunited with his sister Aina, who has been comatose since before the beginning of both Roots and G.U. This episode was shipped to people who had completed all three .Hack//G.U games as a reward and was thus not included in the original series. It was only made available to the Japanese customers, and there are no foreseeable plans to bring "Returner" to other parts of the world.

== Music ==
=== Singles ===
Silly-Go-Round Single was released on May 10, 2006. It contains the opening theme "Silly-Go-Round" along with the song "Angel Gate". Lyrics, composition and arrangement were done by Yuki Kajiura was performed by FictionJunction Yuuka

Silly-Go-Round Tracklist
No.	Title	Lyrics	Music	Length
1.	"Silly-Go-Round" (Opening theme)	Yuki Kajiura	Yuki Kajiura
2.	"Angel Gate"
3.	"Silly-Go-Round (instrumental)"
4.	"Angel Gate (instrumental)"
Total length:				20:50

Boukoku Kakusei Catharsis Single was an album single by ALI PROJECT and was released on 2006. The song was composed by Mikiya Katakura and lyrics were done by Arika Takarano.

No.	Title	Lyrics	Music	Length
1.	"Boukoku Kakusei Catharsis" (亡國覚醒カタルシス)	Arika Takarano	Mikiya Katakura	4:45
2.	"Mizuki Kyouka" (水月鏡花)			4:20
3.	"Boukoku Kakusei Catharsis (instrumental)" (亡國覚醒カタルシス (instrumental))			4:35
4.	"Mizuki Kyouka (instrumental)" (水月鏡花 (instrumental))			4:16
Total length:				17:41

=== Original soundtracks ===
There are currently two soundtracks released for .hack//Roots, called .hack//Roots OST I and .hack//Roots OST II.

- .hack//Roots OST I track list

No.	Title	Lyrics	Length
1.	"God Diva"		4:15
2.	"From Midst of Town"		4:13
3.	"Young Knight and Priestess"		2:31
4.	"Indian Summer"		1:55
5.	"Little Reliance"		1:34
6.	"In The World"		5:03
7.	"Friendly Like in Childhood"		2:11
8.	"Be Elegant"		1:16
9.	"白堊病棟" (Hakua Byōtō / Whitewashed Hospital)		5:10
10.	"Indulgence"		3:05
11.	"Shining of Breast"		3:02
12.	"Immoral Cascade"		2:30
13.	"殉教者の指" (Junkyōsha no Yubi / The Martyr's Finger)		4:20
14.	"Lost Ground"		3:10
15.	"Sluggish Heart"		2:55
16.	"Dwindled Bible"		2:25
17.	"Wolf in Winter"		1:57
18.	"Silly-Go-Round [TV Ver.]" (Opening Theme)	Yuki Kajiura	1:36
19.	"亡國覚醒カタルシス [TV Ver.]" (Boukoku Kakusei Catharsis [TV. Ver.])	Arika Takarano	1:35

- .hack//Roots OST II track list

No.	Title	Length
1.	"KING KNIGHT"	4:16
2.	"illness and ruins"	2:14
3.	"ash wednesday"	2:43
4.	"no fragrance"	3:12
5.	"get gold"	2:29
6.	"obliged with virus"	2:17
7.	"forest cruise"	2:08
8.	"onetime killer"	1:53
9.	"huge knives"	1:54
10.	"Maisou no Mori no Tasogare Saka (埋葬の森の黄昏坂)"	4:39
11.	"give honour to our fellow"	3:01
12.	"early times"	2:15
13.	"cultural pride"	1:58
14.	"the last statement"	2:22
15.	"new species"	1:37
16.	"eternal solitude"	2:13
17.	"northern ground"	2:52
18.	"children's requiem"	1:49
19.	"isolation"	3:28
20.	"out of order"	1:37
21.	"final catastrophe"	2:52
22.	"Yogore Naki Akui (汚れなき悪意)"	4:42
23.	"previous notice"	0:33

== Reception ==
Chris Beveridge of Mania gave the series a B+.
