= Characters of the .hack franchise =

Characters of the Japanese media franchise

Promotional illustration for .hack//Link featuring most of the series' leads as seen in the bottom from left to right: Kite, Tokio and Haseo, Tsukasa. In the middle row: BlackRose, Tsukasa and Subaru. In the top: Orca, Balmung, Ova, Atoli and Fluegel.

.hack comprises "Project .hack" and ".hack Conglomerate". It is a Japanese multimedia franchise primarily developed by CyberConnect2 and published by Bandai. The franchise is set on an Earth with an alternate history. In this timeline, a new version of the Internet arises following a major global computer network disaster in 2005. Central to the premise is a mystery about the wildly popular in-universe video game, The World. As most of the story takes place within The World, characters typically play and interact as their avatars.

The first four video games follow a newcomer called Kite, who goes on a quest to revive his friend, who fell into a coma after his character was killed by an unknown creature. Bee Train also produced an anime series focused on a player named Tsukasa, who has no memory of his identity outside of the game and cannot leave The World. In 2006, Cyber Connect 2 and Bee Train produced two new series: .hack//G.U. and .hack//Roots. The two series involve a returning player by the name of Haseo who, after the loss of his guild, goes on a quest to find the player killer (PK) Tri-Edge who sent his friend Shino into a coma. The latest game by CyberConnect2 is .hack//Link, where Tokio Kuryuu is transported into The World: RX and time-travels across the previous storylines to restore frozen players.

.hack was conceived by CyberConnect2 with the idea of creating a fictional MMORPG in order to simulate a realistic story. The initial characters were designed by Yoshiyuki Sadamoto, while later installments involved additional artists. The critical reception to the original characters has been positive for their designs and realistic traits. The G.U. characters received mixed responses due to Hero's anti-heroic characterization but praise for his growth.

== Creation and design ==
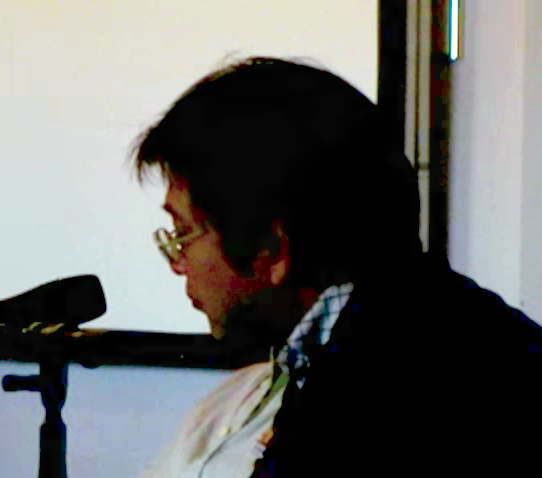
Yoshiyuki Sadamoto designed the characters from the first .hack series and remained as a supervisor for the G.U. trilogy.

Development for .hack began in early 2000 with the aim of creating a distinctive product that would shock and surprise the player. CyberConnect2's president, Hiroshi Matsuyama, played a key role in developing the concept for the series. A number of core ideas, including "slaying dragons or being a thief in London" were explored but rejected in favor of an "offline/online game". The developers looked at a number of MMORPGs such as Phantasy Star Online, Ultima Online, and Final Fantasy XI for inspiration, and drew influences from the prior works of character designer Yoshiyuki Sadamoto (Neon Genesis Evangelion) and scenario writer Kazunori Itō (Ghost in the Shell). Matsuyama stated that the team was proud of having Sadamoto design the cast, despite his lack of previous involvement in gaming, and said that working with him was a great opportunity. Itō noted that casting the player into the role of a subscriber to The World creates a unique story-telling situation that draws the player deeper into the plot.

Sadamoto's character designs follow the fantasy theme, drawing influence from the sword and sorcery subgenre in particular. Character designs also draw on Celtic imagery: Director Mashimo acknowledged similarities between Bear's design and William Wallace from Braveheart, an example of a Celtic warrior. All the characters are given distinctive patterns resembling tattoos that represent Wave, an aspect of the fictional gameplay.

Seiichiro Hosokawa was the lead artist for the .hack//G.U. game trilogy. While CyberConnect2 designed the characters for .hack//G.U., Sadamoto returned as supervisor. As a result, some aesthetics from Haseo's character design featured in the original trailers were removed from the finished product. The trilogy also made a major change by distancing the protagonist, Haseo, from the player in an effort to appeal more to players.

== Main characters ==
=== The World ===
The following is a list of the main characters from the first version of the massively multiplayer online role-playing game The World:

- Aura (アウラ) is an advanced AI that takes the form of a young girl whose white hair, skin, and garments give her a ghostly appearance. She was created by Harald Hoerwick to be a symbol of the daughter he could have had with his deceased lover. She is the perfect AI and the spirit of The World. Since her awakening by Tsukasa, she has been fleeing the clutches of Skeith, as witnessed by Orca, Kite, and several other fictional players. She intends to take in and collect player information by data-draining the current AI control program, Morganna. In response, Morganna intentionally keeps Aura in her sleep-like state. After Morganna's plot to keep Aura asleep by using Tsukasa in .hack//Sign fails, Aura awakens and becomes hunted by Morganna's phases to prevent her from developing Data Drain. Aura manages to cultivate this power into an installation book, which is acquired by Kite. Aura becomes data-drained afterward and is scattered throughout The World. She communicates with Kite and other in-game players through corrupted emails, which leads to the defeat of most of the phases. During the final battle, Aura is scattered again and merges with Morganna to complete the Ultimate AI. She becomes an omnipresent yet mostly silent force within The World for some time. She later sets out to perfect herself by giving two in-game players, Shugo and Rena, chibi versions of their avatars, Kite and Blackrose, in a contest and giving birth to another AI, Zefie. This helps Shugo reach his goal of becoming a hero. Aura's eventual disappearance causes the decline of The World. Consequently, the CC Corp develops Project GU to recreate her. Voiced by: Maaya Sakamoto (Japanese); Lia Sargent (English)
- Albireo (アルビレオ, Arubireo) is the main character of the first volume of the novel .hack//AI buster and a central character in the second volume. In the fictional game, Albireo is a powerful Long Arm character who mostly keeps to himself as a solo player. Outside of the game, Albireo is Kazushi Watarai, a system administrator and debugger for CC Corporation. His job is to work out any glitches in the game and delete any system anomalies. He hunts vagrant AI Lycoris as part of his job, though he later meets and befriends her, unaware of her true nature. With the help of newbie player Hokuto, he helps her regain various pieces of data; when completed, Lycoris realizes that she cannot continue to exist and forces Albireo to delete her. Albireo reappears in .hack//AI buster 2, chasing after Tsukasa, though he soon runs into Macha and is rendered comatose for several months. He is forced to resign from CC Corporation as he is blamed for causing the Twilight Incident. He then meets Hokuto's player, Haruka Mizuhara, and they begin a live-in relationship.
- Balmung (バルムンク, Barumunku), also referred to as Lord Balmung and "Balmung of the Azure Sky", is a legendary player in The World. He earned fame with his Blademaster character by defeating the game event One Sin, which was thought unbeatable, with his partner Orca, causing them to be known as "The Descendants of Fianna". Balmung received his title and white wings, which allow his avatar to float and jump higher than other characters. Balmung truly loves The World and plays it very seriously. He is formal and assertive in his views and sometimes appears arrogant. He follows a strict moral code of doing good in The World, investigates disturbances, and refuses to associate with .hackers. In .hack//Legend of the Twilight, he is much more carefree with new players, though completely businesslike with his associates. Voiced by: Nobuyuki Hiyama (Japanese); Crispin Freeman (English); Doug Erholtz (.hack//Infection)
- Bear (ベア, Bea) is a large, burly Blademaster. He wears relatively little clothing, and most of his body and face are covered in blue wave tattoos resembling Celtic woad. Having played computer games for over thirty years, he uses The World to relax while helping new players and to interact with his estranged son. He enjoys interacting with Mimiru and BT, having met BT in person. Outside of the game, he is a famous novelist named Ryo Sakuma (佐久間 亮, Sakuma Ryō) and enjoys reading and going to the theater. He later becomes the guardian of An Shouji, the player behind Tsukasa, and supports her financially as she attends boarding school. Voiced by: Kazuhiro Nakata (Japanese); Paul Mercier (English)
- BlackRose (ブラックローズ, Burakkurōzu) is a female heavy blade with a tough-as-nails attitude who can be a bit full of herself at times. Clashing with Kite, she attempts to conceal that she's as new to the game as he is. They gradually warm up to each other, and Kite balances her shortcomings. She is searching for a cure for her brother, who was put in a coma by a data bug. Outside the game, she is a tennis player and high-school student named Akira Hayami. Voiced by: Masumi Asano (Japanese); Wendee Lee (English)
- BT is a Wavemaster featured in .hack//Sign. Her avatar has blonde hair and dresses in light green robes. BT focuses her attention on finding the "Key of the Twilight" and seems unconcerned with Tsukasa's predicament. She often meets with Bear and Crim both online and in person. The name BT comes from her favorite food, a BLT sandwich, but without the lettuce, which she hates. Outside the game, she is a former model named Machiko who works at a dispatch company in the Tohoku region. Voiced by: Akiko Hiramatsu (Japanese); Donna Rawlins (English)
- Crim (クリム, Kurimu) is a long arm featured in .hack//Sign. His avatar is a male with spiky blue hair, a red jacket, flared red and yellow pants, and a wave symbol on his chest. Crim plays as a very happy-go-lucky character, easygoing and sociable. He enjoys testing his skills against strong opponents and is always ready to help anyone in need. He founded the Crimson Knights with Subaru, though he eventually leaves. He is very close to Subaru and knows that she is handicapped. He is a businessman outside the game and frequently makes international business trips. Voiced by: Shinichiro Miki (Japanese); Lex Lang (English)
- Cubia is a monster in The World, the 'opposite side' of the mystical "Twilight Bracelet", born during its creation. It constantly attempts to prevent Kite from progressing until it is finally defeated, which results in the destruction of the bracelet. .hack//XXXX features Cubia with a human avatar who befriends Kite. Cubia returns in G.U. as the anti-Epitaph, with power equal to all eight Epitaph PCs. It spreads throughout the internet, causing malfunctions worldwide.
- Elk is a shy Wavemaster who only finds comfort in working with Mia, showing loyalty and concern for her as her condition worsens. He eventually accepts Kite and his companions, and they work together. In the next version of The World, Kaoru Ichinose (一ノ瀬薫), the player behind Elk, creates Endrance (エンデュランス) the Temptress. Endrance obsessively plays the game, logging off only to sleep, and is cold towards other players while interacting with a small cat, which he believes to be the reincarnation of Mia. The cat is actually an AIDA feeding off his emotions. Haseo destroys the AIDA while fighting Endrance, who falls into a deep depression until he becomes connected to Haseo in a similar format, devoting his life to what he believes he owes. Voiced by: Mitsuki Saiga (Japanese); Brianne Siddall (English)
- Gardenia (ガルデニア, Garudenia) is a quiet Long Arm and a romantic with a great love for flowers, which she shares with Kite. Though she seems mysterious, she is not part of the conspiracy that Kite is battling. Recruiting Gardenia in the game is optional; it is done by reading a message board post from her "groupies" and visiting their meeting place. She resembles the character "Mimika", whom Mimiru saw use "Ap Crystal" in the episode "Intermezzo", but, contrary to popular belief, she is not one of the three players who controlled Mimika. Voiced by: Yumi Touma (Japanese); Carolyn Hennesy (English)
- Harald Hoerwick (ハロルド・ヒューイック, Harorudo Hyūikku) is the German programmer responsible for creating The World. He meets his unrequited love interest, Emma Wielant, at a seminar for anthroposophy. Harald was grief-stricken when she died in a car accident, and he created a virtual daughter, Aura, as an expression of his love. His plan to use Aura to gather data on humanity goes awry when the program designed to nurture Aura, Morganna, decides to bend its own programming to stay in existence. Obsessed with completing Aura, he decides to rid himself of his physical body and become part of The World. Morganna traps Harald and restricts him to inaccessible areas, leaving him as "The Broken Man", where he loops dialogue expressing his regrets and the error he made in creating Morganna. He eventually helps Bear and his companions get on the right path to Aura, but Morganna deletes him soon afterward. Remnants in the form of a stone tablet appear to Kite, giving him clues on how to proceed, before being destroyed by Cubia. The next version of The World also features remnants that appear to belong to Haseo. Voiced by: Takumi Yamazaki (Japanese); Crispin Freeman (English)
- Helba (ヘルバ, Heruba) is a professional hacker of extraordinary skills both in and out of The World. She plays an edited Wavemaster (magic-using) character with a white dress with purple triangular designs and hides her eyes behind a red visor. She provides help and information to some of the main characters in the storylines, though she usually works in the background. Helba's name comes from the long-lost, widely distributed text, "The 'Epitaph of Twilight'. She created the Net Slum from a disused town in the game, which serves as a sanctuary for vagrant AI, trash data, and other illegal items. It is suspected that she made a brief appearance in the second episode of .hack//Liminality outside of the game as Kaoru Asaba, a strange woman who helped Yukichin. The information book .hack//analysis, which compiles various information regarding characters and The World, mentions that she is a working single mother with a little girl. Voiced by: Yumi Tōma (Japanese); Mary Elizabeth McGlynn (English)
- Kite (カイト, Kaito) is the main character of the .hack//Games series. He plays a Twin Blade character who is kind, considerate, and courteous to those he meets, even those who hinder his quest to save the coma victims. Kite is a close school friend of Yasuhiko, who plays online as Orca, and joined The World to meet with him there. Soon after, Yasuhiko is placed in a coma by Skeith, and Kite receives the Twilight Bracelet from Aura, allowing him to Data Drain. Following clues set by Aura, Kite defeats the various phases and cubis, destroying the bracelet. Aura eventually gives him a new bracelet called the Dawn Bracelet. In .hack//G.U., Haseo gets a message from BlackRose that indicates that she and Kite met offline and that she has feelings for him. Voiced by: Sayaka Aida (Japanese); Mona Marshall (English)
- Marlo plays a blademaster who has a negative personality and has difficulty showing gratitude. He was a loner until he joined up with Kite. He seems to like Kite because Kite tolerates his rotten personality. Voiced by: Nobuyuki Hiyama (Japanese); Robert Martin Klein (English)
- Mia (ミア) plays a Blademaster in The World, with the appearance of an anthropomorphic cat with purple fur and long rabbit-like ears. She has the strange ability to see Kite's bracelet. While she thinks of herself as a hacker with advanced skills, she is actually an incarnation of the phase, Macha. She is close to Elk because of Elk's resemblance to Tsukasa, a friend from the previous incarnation, and she is constantly searching for an item called "Aromatic Grass". As Kite defeats each phase, she loses her memory and begins to wander the root towns. As The World becomes more corrupt, she eventually awakens as Macha the Temptress. She is destroyed and later revived by Aura. Mia is captured and killed after the Project G.U. (a.k.a. Project Roots) staff remove the Temptress data from her. The original Macha is an AI character created by Morganna to follow Tsukasa and make sure that he never leaves the game. She eventually turns on Morganna and sacrifices herself to save Tsukasa and the others. After Macha was data-drained and killed, her data was reconfigured as Mia. Voiced by: Minami Takayama (Japanese); Debra Rogers (English); Kari Wahlgren (.hack//Sign)
- Mimiru (ミミル) appears in .hack//Sign. She is a 15-year-old girl who plays a female Heavy Blade, which appears as a teenage girl dressed in an armored bikini top and a short skirt, with large greaves on her legs (an outfit similar to BlackRose's). Mimiru plays a tanking character who is poor at planning and following through. Nevertheless, she has a big heart and an even bigger attitude. She meets Tsukasa and soon gains his trust and friendship. She also teams with Bear, whom she refers to as an "old man", and spends considerable time attempting to learn about his career outside of the game. She eventually meets Tsukasa outside of the game as An Shouji, and they go shopping in Shimokita. She is an only child and has few friends. Her father works at a company that manufactures semiconductors. Voiced by: Megumi Toyoguchi (Japanese); Amanda Winn-Lee (English)
- Mistral (ミストラル, Misutoraru) is a Wavemaster character with bright pink hair and an eternally cheerful personality. She joins Kite's campaign in order to search for treasure and plays the game for recreation with no secret agenda. She is a stereotypical noob: hopelessly enthusiastic, begging to be given rare treasures, and using many emoticons in her messages. Near the end of the game, she goes "off-line" in order to give birth. Voiced by: Atsuko Enomoto (Japanese); Sandy Fox (English)
- Moonstone is a Twin Blade character who is obsessed with increasing his character strength. The strong, silent type, he often speaks in one-word phrases or short sentences. He has a great deal of respect for other strong characters and is the first character to send the player his address through email. Voiced by: Yasunori Masutani (Japanese); Lex Lang (English)
- Morganna Mode Gone (モルガナ・モード・ゴン, Morugana Mōdo Gon) is an AI system created by Harald Hoerwick to oversee the birth of Aura by gathering personality data from The World and allowing herself to be absorbed into Aura. However, Morganna attempts to stall the growth of Aura in order to prolong her own existence, resulting in many of the events in the .hack series. In .hack//Sign, she imprisoned Tsukasa in The World and tried to use his negative emotions to prevent Aura from waking, but she failed. She is able to bend her programming by succumbing to a paradox and eventually overcomes her programming to take on the persona of the Cursed Wave from the Epitaph of Twilight. She exists everywhere in The World with the exception of glitched areas; when she is damaged, The World becomes corrupted. Unable to keep Aura sealed, Morganna tries to kill her with the Eight Phases (her creations, which contain part of her data). Morganna is merged with Aura to create the Ultimate AI. Voiced by: Rie Tanaka (Japanese); Valerie Arem (English)
- Natsume (なつめ) is a twin-bladed sword with the same model as the A-20 of .hack//Sign. She is obsessed with gaining more power and fears that she will always be inadequate. Despite this, she has an upbeat nature and is a good teammate. Outside of the game, she is a ninth-grade student who plays The World to gain confidence. To gain her as a party member in the game, one must read her weapon-hunt request and help her acquire a rare sword. Voiced by: Maaya Sakamoto (Japanese); Lia Sargent (English); Kate Higgins (.hack//G.U. Last Recode)
- Nuke Usagimaru is the host of a battle-commentary show where he tries to tackle a powerful monster solo, providing humorous commentary and physical comedy while others watch. Though his gaming attempts often result in failure, Nuke takes it in stride and is always using his past experiences to improve on future shows. Nuke acts in a flashy way even in normal situations. His closest friends in the game are Kite, whom Nuke sees as the ultimate straight man and his ideal partner, and Rachel, who acts as his editor via e-mail. Nuke's character class is "long arm," and his dress is something like that of a clown. Later, by the time of .hack//G.U., it is implied that he and Rachel have become somewhat famous. Voiced by: Nobuyuki Hiyama (Japanese); Derek Stephen Prince (English)
- Orca (オルカ, Oruka) is a high-level male Blademaster played by a fourteen-year-old boy named Yasuhiko. Orca is given the title "Orca of the Azure Sea" after beating an event thought to be unbeatable with Balmung. Orca has been known to lend his strength to fledgling players of The World. After having his friend Kite join the game, he is given the Book of Twilight by Aura due to his reputation. Orca was originally meant to be the true keeper of the Twilight Bracelet, but he is Data Drained by Skeith, leaving Yasuhiko in a coma until Kite helps complete Aura. Voiced by: Yasunori Masutani (Japanese); Kirk Thornton (English)
- Piros (ぴろし, Piroshi) is a heavy axeman with a huge body and a proportionally small head. Piros believes he is the true protagonist of the story and has an odd speech pattern. He involves Kite in his misadventures, which are usually the result of his naivety. Although he can be very childish at times, Piros is a graphics designer and programmer outside the game. Voiced by: Masaya Onosaka (Japanese); Daran Norris (English)
- Rachel is a Blademaster who is greedy and money-obsessed and is always scheming for ideas to make money in The World. She drags Kite into helping with her schemes, which usually fail. Despite her obsession with money, Rachel does not accept anything that is low in quality. Voiced by: Aya Hisakawa (Japanese); Julie Ann Taylor (English)
- Rena Kunisaki (国崎 玲奈, Kunisaki Rena) is a player who wins a special chibi version of BlackRose's avatar in a contest developed by Aura. She originally plays as a female Blademaster named Brigit but becomes bored with The World until she learns of the exploits of Kite and his companions. She then plays with her twin brother, Shugo, using her new character to support him in becoming a hero. The two work to reunite Aura with her daughter, Zefie. Voiced by: Mai Nakahara (Japanese); Allison Keith (English)
- Sanjuro (砂嵐 三十郎) is a Heavy Blade character modelled after a samurai, played by an American man who loves watching Japanese Samurai films and discussing their merits. He is an optional NPC and can only be found if the player reads his message board entry and helps him find a rare weapon. Voiced by: Yasunori Masutani (Japanese); Steven Jay Blum (English)
- Silver Knight (銀漢, Ginkan) is a Blademaster who is the second-in-command of the Crimson Knights under Subaru. His avatar is an edited version of the standard Crimson Knight design, with the addition of full chest and back armor plates, helmet horns, and red eyes. He possesses a strong sense of justice but is extremely naïve, and can be influenced and used as a tool. He is extremely overprotective of Subaru. Silver Knight also appears in the .hack//Legend of the Twilight anime, where he helps Shugo until his character is deleted by the Cerulean Knights. He makes a third appearance in .hack//Roots, where he offers Haseo his assistance after stating that he has been in a similar situation; Haseo refuses. Voiced by: Isshin Chiba (Japanese); Douglas Rye (English)
- Shugo Kunisaki (国崎 秀悟, Kunisaki Shugo) is a player who wins a special chibi version of Kite's avatar in a contest developed by Aura. He originally believed that he had outgrown video games, but after winning the contest along with his twin sister Rena, the two joined The World. He lacks planning skills and has difficulty turning down the requests of others. Aura gives him a version of Kite's Twilight Bracelet that does not harm humans. Aura's plan is to motivate Shugo by allowing him to be a hero after meeting and talking to him using another player's character in the past. Voiced by: Junko Minagawa (Japanese); Bryce Papenbrook (English)
- Skeith (スケィス, Sukeisu),also known as Skeith the Terror of Death, is the first phase that Morganna creates. He absorbs Sora using Data Drain and is then sent to find Aura. His avatar appears as a humanoid seemingly made of rounded rock with floating disjointed appendages and a two-piece ring-shaped horn. Skeith carries a red staff, upon which he 'hangs' (similar to crucifixion) his victims prior to data-draining them. He resides in an amnesic Sora until Aura is found. Skeith seals Sora within his staff and drains Orca, which places Yasuhiko in a coma. Kite later fights and defeats Skeith. Skeith is recreated with the other phases as part of CC Corporation's plan to reconstruct Morganna, though the plan backfires. Based on Sora's condition, the corporation gave him the ability to fuse with players. The seven phases absorb the consciousness of their players and escape into the network. (The seventh, Tarvos, had already been stolen and hidden halfway through the plan), where they waited for the right person to "connect to". Skeith eventually becomes part of Haseo, a new character created by the player of Sora, from whom Skeith had his data drained. Haseo can use Skeith to data drain opponents.
- Sora (楚良) is a Twin Blade player-killer who seeks out attractive female characters and attempts to obtain their addresses. Outside of the game, he is Ryou Misaki, a 10-year-old fourth-grade student. He interacts with Mimiru, who finds him to be a nuisance, and BT, who exchanges information with Sora and is often on the receiving end of his player-killer activities. Sora searches for interesting activities, which leads him to Tsukasa and the Key of the Twilight, Aura. He eventually comes into contact with Morganna and works with her until he becomes bored. She has Skeith Data Drain absorb him, causing Misaki to fall into a coma. Skeith uses Sora's avatar, which is covered in rags and has no memory of past events, to track down Aura. Sora's avatar is later absorbed into Skeith's wand until he is freed by Kite. Misaki awakens from his coma after Morganna is destroyed and later becomes the main protagonist in .hack//G.U. as the creator of the character Haseo. Voiced by: Hiroshi Yanaka (Japanese); Dave Wittenberg (English)
- Subaru (昴) is a female heavy axeman with blue-green hair, a puce-colored tattoo on her forehead, and rudimentary wings on her back. She first joins The World hoping to make friends, though she knows nothing of the game and wanders around for hours. She eventually meets Crim, who teaches her to stand up against other players, and the two form the Crimson Knights to bring order; it is heavily implied they are a couple. She later comes into contact with Tsukasa and forms a somewhat sibling-like bond with him, acting like a devoted older sister. Outside of the game, she is Mariko Misono (御園 真理子, Misono Mariko), a paraplegic girl who enjoys the illusion of mobility in The World. At the end of the series, she meets An Shouji, Tsukasa's player; and they become good friends outside the game. Voiced by: Kaori Nazuka (Japanese); Kim Mai Guest (English)
- Tsukasa (司) is the protagonist of the .hack//Sign anime series. While his body is in a coma, his consciousness remains active in The World through his Wavemaster persona. His avatar is a young, silver-haired boy clad in gray robes. Morganna uses Tsukasa's negative emotions to poison Aura and prevent her awakening. Tsukasa is distant at first, but he eventually connects with Mimiru, Subaru, and Bear. Aura is eventually awakened, allowing Tsukasa to log out. Outside of the game, Tsukasa is a girl named An Shouji (荘司杏, Shōji An), who was raised by an abusive father after the death of her mother. The abuse caused her to dissociate from her gender. After waking from her coma, Ryo Sakuma, the player behind Bear, becomes Shouji's legal guardian and allowing her to go to a boarding school. She meets with Mariko, Subaru's player, and the two begin an offline friendship. Voiced by: Mitsuki Saiga (Japanese); Brianne Siddall (English)
- Wiseman is a wavemaster with a calm and collective attitude and an excellent perspective on business. He is greedy like Rachel, but he shows it indirectly, and his attitude causes people to think that he is holding back information. Outside of the game, he is Takumi Hino, a ten-year-old boy who enjoys collecting trading cards and playing soccer. Voiced by: Takumi Yamazaki (Japanese); Steven Jay Blum (English)
- Zefie (ゼフィ, Zefi) is a vagrant AI and Aura's daughter. She is separated from Aura and becomes attached to Shugo when she smells Aura's scent on his bracelet. She always vies for Shugo's affections and is rude to all who try to stop her. She can control The World and avatar appearances however she sees fit. At first, Zefie is selfish, spoiled, and rude, but she matures through her interactions with Shugo and Rena.

=== The World R:2 ===
The following is a list of the main characters from the second version of The World.

- Haseo (ハセヲ, Haseo) is an Adept Rogue "player killer killer" and the main protagonist of the .hack//G.U. video game series and the .hack//Roots anime series. He is hunted by player killers (PKs) upon entering the game until he joins Ovan of the Twilight Brigade. Ovan eventually disappears, and Haseo's friend Shino is placed into a coma by Tri-Edge. Haseo attempts to find power, which leads him to Harald, who gives him power. He eventually tries to face Tri-Edge, though he is completely reset after being data drained. Haseo agrees to assist Yata and Pi, two system administrators of The World R:2, in their efforts to discover the reason behind recent attacks on players and a sudden increase in AIDA activity. Haseo gains an avatar named Skeith by awakening him, acquiring the ability to call Skeith and wield his abilities. Outside of the game, he is Ryou Misaki, a social outcast who played the PK character Sora in the original series .hack//Games until he was placed into a coma by Skeith and awoke with amnesia. During the story, he matures, enjoys the company of others, and seeks to protect everyone. However, in .hack//LINK, during Tokio's journey in the 2017 timeline, Haseo declined Shino's invitation to rebuild the Twilight Brigade. Voiced by: Takahiro Sakurai (Japanese); Yuri Lowenthal (English); Andrew Francis (.hack//Roots)
- Artificially Intelligent Data Anomaly, shortened to AIDA, is described as a bug or virus, thought to have come from the disappearance of Aura, and defies all system parameters in The World. AIDA afflicts players in the .hack//G.U. series by attacking them and causing them to gradually become insane or for their physical bodies to fall into comas. The eight Epitaph users are partially immune to these effects and fight AIDA. The bad, viral instances of AIDA are deleted at the end of the game series, though it is stated that good instances exist and try to exist happily. AIDA may only be stopped by the Epitaph users' ability to "data drain", an illegal program originally given to Kite by Aura that CC Corp believes also causes AIDA.
- Alkaid is a female Twin Blade known as the "Former Emperor of the Demon Palace". She is part of Icolo's guild and takes part in the arena battles. She fights with Haseo after an argument and loses when Skeith fights for Haseo, thinking him a cheater. She later teams up with Haseo to enter the Holy Palace tournament to see Sirius. While searching for information, she is PKed by an AIDA-infected Bordeaux and placed into a coma until the fight with Cubia. Outside the game, she is Chika Kuramoto, a 16-year-old Japanese girl who lives in Sapporo, Hokkaido, and is on her high school library council. She values reading and reads both Chinese classics and Western contemporary fiction. In the Japanese version, her name is Youkou (揺光 Youkou), the Japanese name for the star Alkaid. Voiced by: Masumi Asano (Japanese); Erin Fitzgerald (English)
- Atoli (アトリ, Atori) is a Harvest Cleric, a pacifist, and a member of the Moon Tree guild. She has feelings for Haseo, which he initially reciprocates due to her avatar's similarity to Shino. She is later revealed to be an Epitaph user. At the end of the .hack//G.U. trilogy, she is heartbroken in the belief that Haseo has reunited with Shino and is surprised when Haseo runs to her. Outside the game, she is Chigusa Kusaka, a 16-year-old girl who lives in the Chiba Prefecture. During middle school she was bullied frequently by her fellow students and treated poorly by her parents, who would often criticize her for her loud and noisy attitude as well as her poor grades and her desire to wear designer clothing. This led her to attempt suicide on more than one occasion, attributed by several cut marks on her left wrist. It was while browsing on several suicide forums that she met Sakaki who suggested she join in playing The World R2. Voiced by: Ayako Kawasumi (Japanese); Bridget Hoffman (English)
- Azure Kite, a.k.a. Azure Flame Kite, from Kite of the Azure Flame, is a Twin Blade-type character who resembles a corrupted, stitched-together version of Kite. He is mute, carries two triple-edged blades known as the Empty Skies, has access to the Data Drain skill, and can fast-travel after turning into a blue light. He is an AI created by Aura that exists to destroy computer viruses and AIDA. Haseo mistakes him for the "Tri-Edge", and fights him; Atoli is scattered but later reforms, though he loses an arm to Ovan. He later joins with Haseo after Cubia is defeated. Voiced by: Sayaka Aida (Japanese); Mona Marshall (English)
- Endrance is a mature version of Elk and an Epitaph user who controls Macha. He is the Emperor of the Demon Palace and is one of the most beautiful and mysterious characters in the game, with many fans. He is cold toward others except for a cat he believes to be the reincarnation of Mia. Endrance initially dislikes Haseo but develops feelings for him when he asks for his help. Outside the game, he is a 20-year-old hikikomori. Voiced by: Mitsuki Saiga (Japanese); Liam O'Brien (English)
- Kuhn (クーン, Kūn) is a Steam Gunner and the Epitaph user who controls Magus the Propagation. He is lighthearted, jovial, and flirts with female avatars, but is also calm and responsible. Kuhn comes in contact with Haseo through the growing AIDA infection. Outside of the game, he is Tomonari Kasumi, who played Sieg in the original version of The World and was the boyfriend of .hack//Liminality protagonist Mai Minase. Kuhn implies that she broke up with him due to his immaturity. Voiced by: Shinichiro Miki (Japanese); Johnny Yong Bosch (English) Louis Chirillo (.hack//Roots)
- Ovan (オーヴァン, Ōvu~an) is a steam gunner who leads the Twilight Brigade. He is guarded with his personal details, except for Shino, who knows him outside the game. Ovan's arm is encased in a lock, concealing a black hatchet-like weapon, which is revealed to be the AIDA known as Tri-Edge, who has been placing users into comas. Ovan seeks to purge the system to save the first victim of the Tri-Edge, his little sister Aina. This requires working with Haseo to defeat Corebenik and activate the Rebirth. Ovan then falls into a coma but awakens to help Haseo defeat Cubia. He reunites with Aina in the OVA "Returner".Voiced by: Hiroki Tochi (Japanese); Jamieson Price (English); Michael Kopsa (.hack//Roots)
- Tri-Edge (トライエッジ, Torai Ejji) is a legendary player killer, whose victims, "The Lost Ones", never log back into the game, and the players are left comatose. His name comes from the fact that he leaves a triple-pronged sign at the location where he defeats his victim. Azure Kite is mistaken for Tri-Edge (due to his triple-bladed twin-blades), but it turns out to be AIDA<Tri-Edge>, an AIDA that infects Ovan's avatar. It forms on his arm and sometimes takes control of him.
- Phyllo is a character owned by Antares, bequeathed to him by an old man who helped Haseo in the first episodes of .hack//Roots. In "Reminisce", he leads Haseo to the Great Temple of Caerleon Medb, which contains weapons that can help destroy AIDA. Voiced by: Junpei Takiguchi (Japanese); Russell Roberts (English)
- Pi is a tribal grappler and an epitaph-PC who controls Tarvos the Avenger. She is a subordinate of Yata and a member of G.U.; outside the game, she is a system engineer for CC Corp named Reiko Saeki, the younger sister of Project G.U.'s former leader Jun Bansyoya. She is also behind the PKer Ender, a character she uses to garner information as a subordinate of Naobi, one of Yata's alter egos. Voiced by: Sanae Kobayashi (Japanese); Jessica Strauss (English) Lisa Ann Beley (.hack//Roots)
- Sakubo (朔望, Sakubō) is supposedly a PC played by two people: Saku, who speaks Kansai-ben, and Bo, a shy and quiet player. Saku is an alternate personality of Bo (albeit the much more forward of the pair) and is obsessed with Endrance. They control the avatar, Gorre. Voiced by: Megumi Toyoguchi (Japanese); Erin Fitzgerald (English)
- Yata (八咫, Yata) is a Macabre Dancer and the Epitaph-PC who controls Fidchell the Prophet. He is a system administrator for CC Corp, assigned to investigate and deal with the AIDA that have appeared in The World R:2 through the G.U. organization. Yata prefers to monitor the situation from his headquarters, the Serpent of Lore, and tends not to reveal his motives. His regard for players is questionable, though his subordinates Pi and Kuhn act more ethically. Outside of the game, Yata is 17-year-old Takumi Hino, who played Wavemaster Wiseman in the original .hack series, as well as the PCs Nala and Naobi. Voiced by: Takumi Yamazaki (Japanese); Steven Jay Blum (English); Paul Dobson (.hack//Roots)

=== The World R:X ===
The following is a list of the main characters from the portable version of "The World".

- Tokio Kuryuu (トキオ, Tokio) is a 14-year-old boy who is very fond of games. He was invited to play Saika's special copy of The World R:X and is directly sent into The World itself. He is a Doubleware, a special kind of human able to use Real Digitalize technology to physically enter a virtual space. Tokio works to retrieve the Chrono Core to open the Akashic Record, forced to do so by Saika but also indebted to Kite, who saved him. In 2014, during the Akashic Line's closed beta test, Tokio succeeded in rescuing an NPC to clear an event. For an instant, he was successfully Real Digitalized by Jyotaro Amagi's test program, becoming the only Doubleware to be discovered by the game. Although he did not understand this at the time, this direct contact left a lasting impression on both him and the NPC (later revealed to be AIKA). Voiced by: Yūko Sanpei
- Saika Amagi (彩花, Saika) is a transfer student in Tokio's class who becomes famous for her excellence in academia and athletics. She tricks Tokio into playing The World R:X to retrieve the chrono core for her. She is secretly Jyotaro Amagi's cousin and adopted sister. An e-mail from Jyotaro (that was actually sent by Geist) instructed her to collect the chronocores to extract him from The World. Voiced by: Ami Koshimizu
- Toki-grunty (トキ★ランディ) is a cow-like grunt that stays in Grand Whale and acts as Tokio's guide.
- AIKA is a mysterious girl who resembles Saika and appears in Tokio's dreams. Prior to knowing her identity, Tokio referred to her as "princess". She granted Tokio the X-Form, encouraging him to continue fighting for those whom he cherished. She serves as a guide throughout the game, accompanying Tokio, who is the only one who can see her. In 2014, AIKA was created as an event NPC in Jyotaro Amagi's online game Akashic Line, subconsciously modeled after his late aunt Ayaka Amagi. During the game's closed beta test, Tokio rescued her to clear an event, and this direct contact left a lasting impression on both him and the NPC. In 2017, she became fused with benevolent AIDA, retaining the memories of the NPC and the personality of AIDA, forming a new type of AI. She was later retrieved by Saika in order to find Jyotaro. In the final battle, AIKA sacrificed herself to purify Aura's corrupted data and disappeared. However, Helba suggested that AIKA might exist somewhere in The World. Voiced by: Ami Koshimizu
- Death Queen Aura, a.k.a. Queen of Demise, is Aura while she was infected by Geist's virus, carried by Tokio. Due to the infection, Aura becomes crazed and tries to ensnare the entire world into her network as a twisted expression of love. She began creating monsters called Legion that spread throughout The World, corrupting data and beginning the process of Twilight to digitally realign humanity. Tokio and the Twilight Knights developed a vaccine program to save her, but succumbed to her power until AIKA interfered. AIKA merges with Aura to restore her memories, which disappear. She's last seen, presumably within her own mind, in her child form with AIKA holding her hands. Voiced by: Maaya Sakamoto (Japanese); Lyon Smith (English)
- Ayaka Amagi (天城綾香, Amagi Ayaka) was Saika's mother and Jyotaro's aunt who died ten years before the events of the series. Her death was one of Jyotaro's reasons for realizing the Immortal Dusk plan.

==== Schicksal ====
- Genius (ジーニアス)
- No. 1, Flügel (フリューゲル))
- No. 2, Metronom (メトロノーム)
- No. 3, Cello (チェロ)
- No. 4, Klarinette (クラリネッテ)
- No. 5, Orgel (オルゲル)
- No. 6, Posaune (ポザオネ)
- No. 7, Trommel (トロンメル)
- No. 8, Geist (ガイスト)

== Supporting characters ==
=== The World ===
- Mai Minase (水無瀬舞, Minase Mai) is the main protagonist of the first episode of .hack//Liminality and the girlfriend of Tomonari Kasumi, the player behind Sieg and Kuhn. Tomonari introduces her to The World, but they are soon attacked by Skeith. While Mai is able to awaken from her coma, Tomonari does not, leading her to investigate the incident and aid Junichiro Tokuoka to help save The World from outside the game during the battle against Cubia. Voiced by: Sanae Kobayashi (Japanese); Michelle Ruff (English)
- Yuki Aihara (相原有紀, Aihara Yuki), known online as Yuki-chin, is the main protagonist of the second episode of .hack//Liminality. She is an acquaintance of Sieg (Tomonari Kasumi) and aids Mai Minase in order to prevent CC Corp from destroying The World and endangering the comatose victims of the game. Voiced by: Saeko Chiba (Japanese); Sherry Lynn (English)
- Kyoko Tohno is the main protagonist of the third episode of .hack//Liminality. Voiced by: Aya Hisakawa (Japanese); Jane Lanier (English)
- Alph, a Wavemaster
- Mistral is a Wavemaster and one of the original Dothackers. She is the first player to join Kite and BlackRose and is fun-loving and reliable. Outside the game, she is a married office worker named Mayumi Kurokawa. Voiced by: Atsuko Enomoto (Japanese); Sandy Fox (English)
- Mireille is a Wavemaster who uses the same avatar as Mistral and is a friend and ally of Rena and Shugo. She loves treasure hunting and is knowledgeable about The World. Her true identity is Mirei Kurokawa (黒川深鈴, Kurokawa Mirei), the daughter of Mayumi Kurokawa (Mistral). Voiced by: Yuki Matsuoka (Japanese); Sandy Fox (English)
- Hotaru is a Wavemaster who plays on the Japanese servers in hopes of improving her Japanese. She is shy and soft-spoken, becomes friends with Shugo and Rena, and enjoys raising Grunties. A drama audio stated that Hotaru is a boy. Voiced by: Ayako Kawasumi (Japanese); Carrie Gordon (English)
- Ouka (凰花, Ōka) is a werewolf, a limited-edition class offered in the expansion of The World. She is called "Ouka of the Divine Fist" due to her famous strength. She is an acquaintance of Mireille. Voiced by: Yuki Kaida (Japanese); Paula Tiso (English)
- Reki (レキ, Reki) is a Wavemaster, known outside the game as Satoshi Fujio. He is a history major who could not find work in his field, so he joined CC Corp as the assistant to system administrator Balmung. Fujio frequently acts as a proxy for his boss, who likes to participate in his planned events. Voiced by: Souichiro Hoshi (Japanese); Derek Stephen Prince (English)
- Kamui (神威) is a female Long Arm and the leader of the Cobalt Knights; outside the game, she is Saki Shibayama (柴山咲, Shibayama Saki), the successor of Kazushi Watarai (Albireo) as CC Corp's system debug administrator. She possesses a strong sense of justice, influenced by Watarai's sudden resignation. Voiced by: Sakiko Tamagawa (Japanese); Melodee M. Spevack (English)
- Magi is a Wavemaster; outside the game, she is Saki Shibayama's assistant. Voiced by: Asako Shirakura (Japanese); Amanda Winn Lee (English)
- Hokuto is a wavemaster and the personal account of player W.B. Yeats. She is an ally of Albireo and witnesses the defeat of the One Sin by Balmung and Orca. Her real name is Haruka Mizuhara, a translator with a strong interest in Celtic literature and poetry.
- Komiyan the Third (コミヤン3世, Komiyan Sansei) is a Blademaster; outside the game, he is a classmate of Rena and Shugo. They find him obnoxious both in and out of The World. Voiced by: Masami Kikuchi (Japanese); Brian Silva (English)
- Morti (モルティ, Moruti) is an AI that appears in the anime version of .hack//Legend of the Twilight Bracelet as an antagonist. Voiced by: Maaya Sakamoto

=== The World R:2 ===
- Adamas, a Blade Brandier
- Aihara, Salvador is a TV celebrity that hosts an online show called Online Jack, which investigated the case of the Lost Ones and the Doll Syndrome. These appear during the .hack//G.U. games in the "News Capture" zone of the false internet. Voiced by: Masashi Ebara (Japanese); Daran Norris (English)
- Aina Indou is Ovan's little sister and his first victim. Her character is hidden in an area of The World called "The Creators Room," but she escapes from it and becomes a ghost who appears intermittently. She awakens from her coma after the Rebirth, and on seeing Haseo, she blames him for her brother's coma but later realizes her mistake and helps him. She is reunited with Ovan in the OVA "Returner". She also appears years later in .hack//Quantum with the same character model. Voiced by: Atsuko Enomoto (Japanese); Rachel Hirschfeld (English) Jenny Kwan (.hack//G.U. Last Recode)
- Antares is a blade brandisher known as "The Legendary Emperor" due to his arena ranking, until he is defeated by Taihaku. He is also the founder of Icolo. He takes Haseo under his wing, although Haseo does not call him "master" until after the fight with Cubia. Outside the game, he is Mikihisa Ogata. Voiced by: Shinpachi Tsuji (Japanese); Kirk Thornton (English)
- Asta is an Edge Punisher, a player-killer who pairs with Iyoten to hunt and kill beginner players. Outside the game, she is Tatsumi Hori. Voiced by: Yoko Honna (Japanese); Sandy Fox (English) Kate Higgins (.hack//G.U. Vol.3) Tabitha St. Germain (.hack//Roots)
- Azure Balmung is a creation of Aura, made to hunt anomalies in The World. He looks like a wounded version of Balmung. He joins Haseo at the end of the fight with Cubia. Voiced by: Nobuyuki Hiyama (Japanese); Crispin Freeman (English)
- Azure Orca is a creation of Aura, made to hunt anomalies in The World. He looks like a wounded version of Orca and is mute. He joins Haseo at the end of the fight with Cubia. Voiced by: Yasunori Masutani (Japanese); Kirk Thornton (English)
- Bordeaux (ボルドー, Borudō) is a Blade Brandier, an established player-killer who usually parties with Negimaru and Grein. She is also a member of Kestrel and well respected in the PK community. She is obsessed with gaining fame by defeating the terror of death. In Vol. 2, Bordeaux is infected by an AIDA, which enhances her fighting capabilities. Outside the game, she is Nina Kircheis, a German-Japanese 14-year-old middle-school student. She gives Haseo her member address at the end of the game. Voiced by: Akiko Hiramatsu (Japanese); Mary Elizabeth McGlynn (English) Alison Matthews (.hack//Roots)
- Gabi (がび, Gabi) is an Edge Punisher and the laissez-faire Guildmaster of Kestrel. Although his guild is overrun with PKs, he is not a PK himself. He is an old friend of Kuhn's. Outside the game, he is Daijirou Washio. Gabi is extremely quick, owing to the hacked PC that Daijirou uses to play. Voiced by: Kōji Ishii (Japanese); D.C. Douglas (English)
- Gaspard (ガスパー, Gasupaa) is a Shadow Warlock and a member of Canard who assists in helping new players. He is sensitive and clumsy, and he plays for fun. He and Silabus were the only members of Canard at the start of the G.U., and he respects former Canard member Kuhn. Outside of the game, he is a 13-year-old middle school student named Maki Kouta. Gaspard's favorite part of The World is the card game feature called "Crimson VS.", which is not available in the first volume. Voiced by: Akiko Yajima (Japanese); Dave Wittenberg (English) Richard Ian Cox (.hack//Roots)
- Hiiragi (柊, Hīragi) is a macabre dancer and the leader of the Fifth Division of the Moon Tree Guild, appearing in Volume 2 of .hack//G.U.. He is one of Sakaki's followers. Outside of the game, he is Yuki Fumihiko, a 22-year-old closeted homosexual. Voiced by: Taiki Matsuno (Japanese); Doug Erholtz (English)
- Kaede (楓, Kaede) is a Blade Brandier and third platoon leader of Moon Tree, with a kind and sincere attitude. She is one of the many supporters of Zelkova in his conflict with Sakaki and often opposes Sakaki's decisions. Outside the game, she is Kyouko Kaga, and she gives Haseo her member address in volume 3. Voiced by: Sayaka Ohara (Japanese); Kari Wahlgren (English)
- Matsu (松, Matsu) is an Adept Rogue, the seventh platoon leader of Moon Tree, and a supporter of Sakaki. He was once a famous PK, but has since grown ashamed of this and no longer uses his Edge Punisher form. Outside the game, he is Shingo Kudou. Voiced by: Hiroshi Yanaka (Japanese); Dave Wittenberg (English)
- Natsume (なつめ, Natsume) is a Twin Blade and former .hacker from the original games who returns in Vol. 3 as a chaotic PK with a split personality. She is in search of Tri-Edge, which she believes to be a weapon, and holds a seven-year obsession for Kite. Haseo gets her member address after clearing the Chaotic PK side quest. Outside the game, she is Natsume Oguro. Voiced by: Maaya Sakamoto (Japanese); Lia Sargent (English); Kate Higgins (.hack//G.U. Last Recode)
- Nala (楢, Nara) is Lord Partizan, the fourth division leader of Moon Tree, who appears in Volume 2 of .hack//G.U.. He holds a neutral position within the guild and is used by Yata. Outside the game, he is Takumi Hino. Voiced by: Takumi Yamazaki (Japanese); Steven Jay Blum (English)
- Piros the 3rd (ぴろし3, Piroshi3) is the same .hacker Piros from the original games. He is Lord Partizan, Guildmaster of the coincidentally named Project GU (Graphics Umai meaning "Good at Graphics"; in the English adaptation, "Graphics Unbelievable") guild. Piros searches for Tri-Edge with Haseo, but for his own reasons. Outside of the game, he is Hiroshi Matsuyama, a graphics designer for The World. Voiced by: Masaya Onosaka (Japanese); Daran Norris (English)
- Sakaki (榊, Sakaki) is an edge-puncher and the second division leader of Moon Tree, famous throughout The World. He appears to be part of a sinister plot, resulting in tension between Zelkova and himself. He tries to create an ideal world by dominating the minds of people through the eight phases and the internet. Sakaki is a role model for Atoli, who is obsessed with him. Outside of the game, he is a 10-year-old elementary school student named Uike Tooru. He briefly replaces Yata as leader of GU in Vol. 3 before being killed by Azure Kite and going into a coma. He awakens with no memories of what happened after the rebirth of the internet. Voiced by: Katsuyuki Konishi (Japanese); Crispin Freeman (English)
- Silabus (シラバス, Shirabasu) is a Blade Brandier and Guildmaster of Canard at the start of G.U. (when the only other member is Gaspard). He eventually gives the position to Haseo. He is in awe of former Canard member Kuhn. Outside of the game, he is a 19-year-old university student named Morino Yuuichi and started using the internet at age 9. Voiced by: Daisuke Sakaguchi (Japanese); Sam Riegel (English); Reece Thompson (.hack//Roots)
- Shino is a Harvest cleric, a friend of Haseo, and a devoted friend of Ovan. She was a member of the Twilight Brigade, a guild Ovan led to search for the 'Epitaph of Twilight' in The World: R2, and introduced Haseo to Ovan. When she is mysteriously PKed by Tri-Edge, saving Shina from a coma becomes Haseo's primary motivation to continue playing The World: R2. Outside of the game, she is a nursing student named Shino Nanao. Voiced by: Kaori Nazuka (Japanese); Kari Wahlgren (English); Kelly Sheridan (.hack//Roots).
- Sirius (天狼, Tenrō) is a tribal grappler and one of the current members of Icolo, and thus Emperor of the Holy Palace, ranked between Endrance and Taihaku. He is arrogant and generally unlikable. He is later infected with AIDA and fights Haseo in the arena. It is then revealed that the Orca and Balmung associated with him were mirages created by Atoli's infected avatar. Outside the game, he is known as Min Myeon-Do. Voiced by: Isshin Chiba (Japanese); Michael McConnohie (English)
- Sophora (槐, Enjū) is a Twin Blade and the sixth division leader of Moon Tree, appearing in .hack//G.U. volume 2. Sophora appears to support Sakaki and seems to be the player behind Nanase from .Hack//Alcor. Voiced by: Houko Kuwashima (Japanese); Lia Sargent (English)
- Tabby (タビー, Tabī) is a tribal grappler who joined the Twilight Brigade around the same time as Haseo and sought to aid his quest to revive Shino. Outside of the game, she is Moe Kubo, who stopped playing at the end of .hack//roots anime to study nursing but returns in vol. 3 to help out for one day. She later offers her extended help. Voiced by: Megumi Toyoguchi (Japanese); Stephanie Sheh (English); Maryke Hendrikse (.hack//Roots)
- Taihaku (太白, Taihaku) is a steam gunner and guildmaster of Icolo, making him the Emperor of the Sage Palace and one of the most powerful characters in The World. Outside of the game, he is Keisuke Kurokai. Voiced by: Kazuhiro Nakata (Japanese); D.C. Douglas (English); Ross Douglas (.hack//Roots)
- Zelkova (欅, Keyaki) is a flick reaper and guildmaster of Moon Tree, who appears as a young child with horns on his head. Zelkova is an expert hacker who created the Netslum in The World R:2. It is often assumed that he is the same person as Helba from The World, as they're both expert hackers, lead Net Slum, know Yata (a.k.a. Wiseman), and understand the inner workings of the game. Voiced by: Akiko Kimura (Japanese); Wendee Lee (English)

== Reception ==
Jeremy Dunham of IGN was impressed by the game's commitment to preserving the illusion of online gameplay and praised the character designs and inclusion of the Japanese voice track, but criticized the camera manipulation, shortness, and lack of difficulty. A Game Informer reviewer praised the way the game captures the sense of community that a real MMORPG offers.

Regarding the cast of .hack//Sign, an Anime Academy reviewer writes that the anime's depiction of the game-world setting is realistic and accurate. Reviewers appreciated the English voice acting: Lauren Synger from DVD Vision Japan feels that "everyone was very appropriate to their characters", particularly noting that Brianne Sidal did an excellent job capturing Saiga's Tsukasa.

IGN suggested that the storyline of GU could be streamlined by allowing e-mail access within The World. Despite deriding the "filler" story of Rebirth, Sullivan found Reminisce to be much more enjoyable due to its more mature storyline. Mania found Haseo's skills useless in combat but liked his relationship with the Twilight Brigade, as it allows the cast to be explored personally since the premise focuses on player interaction. Both Haseo and Atoli's actors, Takahiro Sakurai and Ayako Kawasumi, were highly praised for their work in the OVA. ANN enjoyed Kawasumi's vocal range of emotions with Atoli but had mixed thoughts about how Sakurai can make Haseo more likeable, notwithstanding his otherwise striking performance.
