= List of .hack//Sign episodes =

Originally, .hack//Sign was broadcast in Japan on TV Tokyo between April 4, 2002, and September 25, 2002. The same year Victor Entertainment released the entire score in three albums, along with a single containing the opening and ending of the series.

In North America .hack//Sign was licensed and distributed by Bandai Entertainment, and dubbed by PCB Productions, who are known for their adaptations of fare like Geneshaft. The dub aired on Cartoon Network's Toonami between February 1, 2003, and March 1, 2004. The series was also released on DVD, spanning six volumes. The limited edition ran from March 4, 2003, to March 16, 2004, followed by the regular edition from March 18, 2003, to March 16, 2004. A recap episode called Evidence and the DVD only episode Intermezzo were included in the sixth volume, and Unison was only included in its limited edition. Following the multimedia concept of the franchise, Bandai also acquired the license for the .hack games, the first one being released the same month the anime series began broadcast.

The multimedia approach is shown through the DVD release as well. The limited edition not only included the three soundtrack albums of the series, but also the soundtrack of .hack//Liminality and a demo disc of the first game. The series was compiled three times. The first DVD boxset was released on October 26, 2004, by the name .hack//Sign – Complete Collection, and the second, more affordable one on August 22, 2006, by the name .hack//Sign: Anime Legends Complete Collection. Neither of these releases contains the OVA episode "Unison". The third, named .hack//Sign: The Complete Series, was released by Funimation in 2015. This release contains the OVA episode "Unison".

== Episode list ==
No.	Title	Original release date	English air date
1	"Role Play"; Transliteration: "rouru purei" (Japanese: ロールプレイ)	April 4, 2002	1 February 2003
Tsukasa wakes up to find himself in The World, but he has no idea why he is there or who he is. The situation worsens when he discovers he is trapped in the game.
2	"Guardian"; Transliteration: "gadeian" (Japanese: ガーディアン)	April 11, 2002	8 February 2003
Mimiru and Bear are concerned about Tsukasa's inability to log out. Meanwhile, the Crimson Knights treat him as an illegal character. Tsukasa shows his guardian monster to Mimiru and Bear.
3	"Folklore"; Transliteration: "denshou" (Japanese: 伝承)	April 18, 2002	15 February 2003
BT suggests Tsukasa is related to the legendary item, the Key of the Twilight and Sora suspects it. Bear tells Subaru that Tsukasa may be a victim.
4	"Wanted"; Transliteration: "shimeitehai" (Japanese: 指名手配)	April 24, 2002	22 February 2003
Tsukasa's guardian has been uncontrollably attacking characters. Wanting to talk with him, Subaru gives the order to make him a 'wanted' on all servers of The World.
5	"Captured"; Transliteration: "toriko shuu" (Japanese: 虜囚)	May 1, 2002	29 March 2003
Tsukasa learns to control his guardian while hiding. Silver Knight and Sora plot a double-cross for the Knights to arrest Tsukasa.
6	"Encounter"; Transliteration: "enkaunto" (Japanese: エンカウント)	May 8, 2002	5 April 2003
In captivity, Subaru talks with Tsukasa and she finds out just how real The World has become to him. She decides to release him, but they are interrupted as Sora arrives to 'rescue' him.
7	"Reason"; Transliteration: "riyuu" (Japanese: 理由)	May 15, 2002	12 April 2003
Mimiru meets an inexperienced player, A20, and helps her to learn the ways of The World. Through her, Mimiru answers her own question of why she plays the game.
8	"Promise"; Transliteration: "yakusoku" (Japanese: 約束)	May 22, 2002	19 April 2003
Wanting to meet up with Tsukasa once more, Mimiru sends him mail asking him to meet at a certain place. She intends to wait there, for however long, until he appears. BT meets Crim and ask for his help in searching for the Key of the Twilight.
9	"Epitaph"; Transliteration: "epitafu" (Japanese: エピタフ)	May 29, 2002	26 April 2003
The investigation into the Key of the Twilight begins, and it seems they will get the help of the hacker Helba. Tsukasa encounters a player who asks him to watch her Puchiguso, (Grunty in the English version) who becomes sicker.
10	"Compensation"; Transliteration: "daishou koui" (Japanese: 代償行為)	June 5, 2002	3 May 2003
Bear deals with being an inadequate father when BT tells him that may explain his concern for Tsukasa. Subaru and Tsukasa become closer, while BT and Crim delve further into BBS clues concerning the Key of the Twilight.
11	"Party"; Transliteration: "pateii" (Japanese: パーティー)	June 12, 2002	10 May 2003
Mimiru and Bear take on a non-fighting quest, forming a party with Tsukasa. Sora plans to pursue him.
12	"Entanglement"; Transliteration: "sakusou" (Japanese: 錯綜)	June 19, 2002	17 May 2003
Tsukasa is shocked to see Aura covered in vines, as Morganna asks him if he really wants to return to the world. Bear and Subaru discuss what will happen to Tsukasa's player when and if he wakes up.
13	"Twilight Eye"; Transliteration: "tasogare no me" (Japanese: 黄昏の眼)	June 26, 2002	24 May 2003
The players have figured out how to open the Twilight Eye, and to follow the path it reveals. BT and Crim are going in, but BT is plotting something with Sora. With the help of Helba, Bear, Mimiru and Tsukasa follow them.
14	"Castle"; Transliteration: "gyaku shiro toshi" (Japanese: 逆城都市)	July 3, 2002	31 May 2003
After opening the Eye, BT, Crim, Bear, Mimiru and Tsukasa find a hidden area in search for the key. They find a fragmented AI version of "Harald Hoerwick". After speaking to him, the place begins to collapse. Bear falls down from the bridge and Tsukasa sacrifices himself to save Mimiru from the guardian whom Macha summons. Tsukasa logs off from the game immediately following the data drain.
15	"Evidence"; Transliteration: "shou" (Japanese: 証)	July 10, 2002	7 June 2003
An overview of the series so far using a series of flashbacks.
16	"Depth"; Transliteration: "shinen" (Japanese: 深淵)	July 17, 2002	14 June 2003
Tsukasa logs in and entering Morganna's domain. He learns that he survived in the place and begins to doubt his own existence. Tsukasa finds Subaru and she reassures him of the situation.
17	"Conflict"; Transliteration: "konfurikuto" (Japanese: コンフリクト)	July 24, 2002	21 June 2003
BT asks Crim to meet outside the game and is rejected. She is upset at Subaru. Later, she joins some characters who want her help only to find out they have tricked her. Tsukasa rescues her and recognizes the meaning of her name.
18	"Declaration"; Transliteration: "sengen" (Japanese: 宣言)	July 31, 2002	28 June 2003
Silver Knight foils every attempt Subaru makes to meet Tsukasa and his friends, believing that someone of her stature and responsibility should have nothing to do with any illegal character. When Subaru becomes aware of this and realizes how far they have deviated from their original purpose, she decides to disband the Crimson Knights.
19	"Recollection"; Transliteration: "tsuioku" (Japanese: 追憶)	August 7, 2002	5 July 2003
Subaru wanders The World, recalling her first steps in the game and how she and Crim founded the Crimson Knights. Subaru is attacked by another character and Tsukasa finds her injured. As they spend time together, Subaru recalls her memory.
20	"Tempest"; Transliteration: "arashi" (Japanese: 嵐)	August 14, 2002	12 July 2003
Tsukasa and Subaru arrive to the domain, only to find Aura gone. Meanwhile, the others follow Bear's suggestion to finalize the search for the Key of the Twilight. Subaru tells Mimiru about Aura, but she thinks she should not have left Tsukasa alone. Morganna forces Tsukasa to stay on the bed.
21	"Despair"; Transliteration: "zetsubou" (Japanese: 絶望)	August 21, 2002	19 July 2003
Macha realizes her mistake, when Tsukasa becomes catatonic. When a group of distorted monsters appear in The World, the others decide to visit Helba and AI Harald.
22	"Phantom"; Transliteration: "yuurei" (Japanese: 幽霊)	August 28, 2002	26 July 2003
Bear, Mimiru and Subaru travel to another fragment of the AI Harald, encounter another unbeatable monster, but are saved by Balmung. From Harald, they learn about Aura and Tsukasa.
23	"The Eve"; Transliteration: "zenya" (Japanese: 前夜)	September 4, 2002	2 August 2003
Tsukasa manages to pass through the gate with the others, when Crim tells him about Subaru's condition. The gate appears and they enter, except Subaru who is waiting for Tsukasa.
24	"Net Slum"; Transliteration: "netto suramu" (Japanese: ネットスラム)	September 18, 2002	16 August 2003
Tsukasa arrives and the party reaches Net Slum, Helba's domain. Helba reveals Morganna's plan, and Tsukasa reveals to Subaru that he is a girl in real life. The party plans to defend Subaru from Morganna, since Morganna wants Tsukasa to be in despair. Tsukasa decides that he wants to meet Subaru in real life.
25	"Catastrophe"; Transliteration: "katasutorofu" (Japanese: カタストロフ)	September 18, 2002	23 August 2003
While Subaru, Tsukasa and the party arrive at the cathedral, Morganna sends Sora and four guardians after them. Macha sacrifices herself to save the others, before Morganna transports Tsukasa, Subaru and Mimiru to an unknown area.
26	"Return"; Transliteration: "kikan" (Japanese: 帰還)	September 25, 2002	30 August 2003
Sora sacrifices himself to distract Morganna, allowing Tsukasa, Subaru, Mimiru and the awakened Aura to escape. Tsukasa, now confirmed to be a girl, logs out from the game and wakes up from the coma. She meets Subaru's player in a wheelchair.

== OVAs ==
No.	Title	Original release date	English release date
27	"Intermezzo"	28 March 2003	7 June 2003
Two years before the events of the series, Mimiru is playing as an earlier character. She and her selfish companion meet a Long Arm named Mimika, a character controlled by three girls. Mimika sacrifices herself, teaching Mimiru the meaning of the game.
28	"Unison"	24 October 2003	N/A
One month after the events of .hack//Quarantine, Tsukasa returns to "The World" for the first time, while the revived Sora joins the others. The episode ends with everyone celebrating the party at Net Slum hosted by Helba.
