= .hack =

Japanese multimedia franchise

.hack logo

.hack (pronounced "Dot Hack") is a Japanese series that encompasses two projects: Project .hack and .hack Conglomerate. They were primarily created and developed by CyberConnect2, and published by Bandai Namco Entertainment. The series features an alternative history setting in the rise of the new millennium regarding the technological rise of a new version of the internet following a major global computer network disaster in the year 2005, and the mysterious events regarding the wildly popular fictional massively multiplayer online role-playing game The World.

== Project .hack ==
Project .hack was the first project of the .hack series. It launched in 2002 with the anime series .hack//Sign in April 2002 and the PlayStation 2 game .hack//Infection in June 2002. Project developers included Koichi Mashimo (Bee Train), Kazunori Itō (Catfish) and Yoshiyuki Sadamoto (Gainax). Since then, Project .hack has spanned television, video games, manga and novels. It centers mainly on the events and affairs of the prime installment of The World. The franchise began internationally when Bandai announced .hack//Infection, which was released in 2003 and .hack//Sign got an English dub, which was released on Cartoon Network in the same year.

=== Games ===
Cardback of the .hack//Enemy collectible card game

- .hack, a series of four PlayStation 2 games that follow the story of the .hackers, Kite and BlackRose, and their attempts to find out what caused the sudden coma of Kite's friend, Orca, and BlackRose's brother, Kazu. The volumes included .hack//Infection, .hack//Mutation, .hack//Outbreak and .hack//Quarantine.
- .hack//frägment, the first .hack massively multiplayer online game (online role-playing game). It was released only in Japan, the online servers began on November 23, 2005, and ended on January 18, 2007.
- .hack//Enemy, a collectible card game created by Decipher Inc. based on the .hack series. It was discontinued after running five separate expansions between 2003 and 2005.

=== Anime ===
- .hack//Sign is an anime television series directed by Kōichi Mashimo and produced by studio Bee Train and Bandai Visual. It consists of twenty six original episodes and three additional ones, released on DVD as original video animations. The series focuses on a Wavemaster (magic user) named Tsukasa, a player character in the virtual reality game. He wakes up to find himself in a dungeon in The World, but he suffers amnesia as he wonders where he is and how he got there. The situation gets worse when he discovers he cannot log out and is trapped in the game. Tsukasa embarks with other players on a quest to find the truth behind the abnormal situation. The series is influenced by psychological and sociological subjects, such as anxiety, escapism and interpersonal relationships. The series premiered in Japan on TV Tokyo between April 4, 2002, and September 25, 2002. It was later broadcast across East Asia, Southeast Asia, South Asia, and Latin America by the anime television network, Animax; and across the United States, Nigeria, Canada, and the United Kingdom by Cartoon Network, YTV, and AnimeCentral (English and Japanese) respectively. It is distributed across North America by Bandai Entertainment.
- .hack//Legend of the Twilight is a miniseries adaptation of the manga series written by Tatsuya Hamazaki and drawn by Rei Izumi. The series was directed by Koichi Mashimo and Koji Sawai, and produced by Bee Train. Set in a fictional MMORPG, The World, the series focuses on twins Rena and Shugo, who receive chibi avatars in the design of the legendary .hackers known as Kite and BlackRose. After Shugo is given the Twilight Bracelet by a mysterious girl, the two embark on a quest to find Aura and unravel the mystery of the Twilight Bracelet. The anime series features many of the same characters as the manga version, but with an alternative storyline. It was localized as .hack//Dusk, among other names, in fan translations prior to the official English release.
- .hack//Liminality is a set of four DVD OVAs included with the .hack video game series for the PlayStation 2. Liminality is focused on the real world as opposed to the games' MMORPG The World. Separated into four volumes; each volume was released with its corresponding game. The initial episode is 45 minutes long and each subsequent episode is 30 minutes long. The video series was directed by Koichi Mashimo, and written by Kazunori Itō with music by Yuki Kajiura. Primary animation production was handled by Mashimo's studio Bee Train which collaborated for the four games as well as handled major production on .hack//Sign. Liminality follows the story of Mai Minase, Yuki Aihara, Kyoko Tohno, and ex-CyberConnect employee Junichiro Tokuoka as they attempt to find out why players are falling into comas when playing in The World.
- .hack//Gift, a self-deprecating, tongue-in-cheek, OVA that was created as a "gift" for those who had bought and completed all four .hack video games. It was released under Project .hack. In Japan, it was available when the Data Flag on the memory card file in .hack//Quarantine was present, whereas the American version included Gift on the fourth Liminality DVD. It is predominantly a comedy that makes fun of everything that developed throughout the series, even the franchise's own shortcomings. Character designs are deliberately simplistic.

=== Novels ===
- .hack//AI buster, a novel released under Project .hack, in 2002. It tells the story of Albireo and a prototype of the ultimate AI, Lycoris, and of how Orca and Balmung defeated "The One Sin" and became the Descendants of Fianna.
- .hack//AI buster 2, a collection of stories released under Project .hack. It involves the characters of AI Buster and Legend of the Twilight Bracelet: ".hack//2nd Character", ".hack//Wotan's Spear", ".hack//Kamui", ".hack//Rumor" and ".hack//Firefly". "Rumor" was previously released with the Rena Special Pack in Japan.
- .hack//Another Birth, a novel series released under Project .hack. It retells the story of the .hack video games from BlackRose's point of view.
- .hack//Zero, a novel series released under Project .hack. It tells the story of a Long Arm named Carl, of what happened to Sora after he was trapped in The World by Morganna, and of Tsukasa's real life after being able to log out from The World.
- .hack//Epitaph of Twilight, a novel series telling the story of Harald Hoerwick's niece, Lara Hoerwick, who finds herself trapped in an early version of The World.

=== Manga ===
- .hack//Legend of the Twilight, a manga series released under Project .hack. It tells the story of two player characters Shugo and Rena, as they win a mysterious contest that earns them chibi character models of the legendary .hackers Kite & BlackRose.

== .hack Conglomerate ==
.hack Conglomerate is the current project of .hack by CyberConnect2 and various other companies and successor to Project .hack. The companies include Victor Entertainment, Nippon Cultural Broadcasting, Bandai, TV Tokyo, Bee Train, and Kadokawa Shoten. It encompasses a series of three PlayStation 2 games called .hack//G.U., an anime series called .hack//Roots, prose, and manga. .hack Conglomerate focuses on times and installments after the original The World MMORPG.

=== Games ===
- .hack//G.U. is a series of three video games (Vol. 1 Rebirth, Vol. 2 Reminisce, and Vol. 3 Redemption) released for the .hack Conglomerate project. Taking place in the installment of The World R:2 in the year 2017, the series focuses on the player Haseo's search for a cure after his friend was attacked by a player known as Tri-edge, which led to his eventual involvement with Project G.U, and the mysterious anomalies called AIDA that plague The World R:2. A remastered collection was released on November 3, 2017, for the PlayStation 4 and PC that included all three previous volumes and added a new 4th volume called Reconnection.
- .hack//Link, a PSP game released under the .hack Conglomerate project. It was claimed to be the last game in the series; the game centers on a youth named Tokio in the year 2020, who is given a free copy of The World R:X by the popular but mysterious new classmate Saika Amagi. Contains unplayable characters from .hack and .hack//G.U. video games.
- .hack//Versus, a PS3 game released under the .hack Conglomerate project. The game is the first .hack fighter game, which is bundled with the film .hack//The Movie.
- .hack//Guilty Dragon, a card-based mobile game for Android and iOS, it was exclusive for Japan. Its services began from October 15, 2012, and ended on March 23, 2016.
- .hack//G.U. The Card Battle is a trading card game similar to that of .hack//Enemy released under the .hack Conglomerate project. Unlike .hack//Enemy, the game was made by the original creators of .hack//G.U.. There are two sets of rules, one based on the mini game in the G.U. series, Crimson VS, and the one specifically designed for the trading card game. This game won the Origins Award for Best Trading Card Game of 2003.
- New World Vol. 1: Maiden of Silver Tears, an Android & iOS game released under the .hack Conglomerate project. it was a Japanese exclusive mobile game, it served as a reboot to the franchise. Services began on January 8, 2016, and ended on December 20, 2016.
- .hack//Z.E.R.O., a new game announced in 2026.

=== Anime ===
- .hack//Roots is an anime series released under the .hack Conglomerate project. It follows Haseo and his joining (and subsequent exploits with) the Twilight Brigade guild. It also shows his rise to power and how he becomes known as "The Terror of Death". Towards the end of the series we see the start of .hack.//G.U. This series is the last in the .hack anime series to be licensed by Bandai Entertainment.
- .hack//G.U. Trilogy, a CGI movie adaptation of the .hack//G.U. video games released under the .hack Conglomerate project.
- .hack//G.U. Returner, a short follow up OVA and the conclusion to .hack//Roots released under the .hack Conglomerate project. It tells the story about the characters of .hack//G.U. in one last adventure.
- .hack//Quantum, a three part OVA series from Kinema Citrus and the first in the anime series of .hack to be licensed by Funimation.
- .hack//The Movie, a CGI movie, announced on August 23, 2011. On January 21, 2012, it was launched in theaters throughout Japan. The movie takes place in the year 2024, where a reboot of The World under the name FORCE:ERA is released to a new generation of players.
- Thanatos Report, OVA in .hack//Versus unlocked after finishing Story Mode.

=== Novels ===
- .hack//Cell, a novel series released under the .hack Conglomerate project, written by Ryo Suzukaze. .hack//CELL takes place at the same time as .hack//Roots. The main premise of the story covers the happenings that Midori and Adamas witness and experience in The World R:2, an extremely popular MMORPG that is a new version of the original game, The World. Midori meets numerous characters from .hack//Roots (most notably Haseo) and .hack//G.U. (such as Silabus and Gaspard). The main plot centers around Midori selling herself out to would-be PKers, and some real-world events that center around the girl who also bears the name Midori (Midori Shimomura) who is in a coma. It is later revealed that Midori is a sentient PC, a result of the "virtual cell" that was taken from Midori Shimomura's blood. After Midori Shimomura awakens from her coma, she enters The World R:2 with a PC identical to Midori. Tokyopop has obtained the rights to .hack//CELL and was released on March 2, 2010.
- .hack//G.U., a novel series adaptation of the three .hack//G.U. Video games released under the .hack Conglomerate project.
- .hack//bullet, a web novel that follows Flugel after the events of .hack//Link.

=== Manga ===
- .hack//4koma, a yonkoma manga series most of the 4-Koma is filled with gags and parodies centring mostly around the main characters of the original .hack video game series and the .hack//G.U. video games series.
- .hack//Alcor, a manga series released under the .hack Conglomerate project. It focuses on a girl called Nanase, who appears to be quite fond of Silabus, as well as Alkaid during her days as empress of the Demon Palace.
- .hack//GnU, a humorous manga series released under the .hack Conglomerate project. It revolves around a male Blade Brandier called Raid and the seventh division of the Moon Tree guild.
- .hack//G.U.+, a manga adaptation series loosely based on the three .hack//G.U. video games, released under the .hack Conglomerate project.
- .hack//XXXX (read as "X-Fourth"), a manga adaptation series released under the .hack Conglomerate project. The manga is loosely based on the four original .hack video games.
- .hack//Link, manga series released under the .hack Conglomerate project. It occurs three years after the end of .hack//G.U. in a new version of The World called The World R:X. It focuses on a player named Tokio and a mysterious exchange student named Saika.

== Other appearances ==
A few characters from the franchise appear in the Nintendo 3DS games Project X Zone and Project X Zone 2.
