= .hack (video game series) =

Video game series

- Genre: Action role-playing
- Developer: CyberConnect2
- Publisher: Bandai
- Creator: Hiroshi Matsuyama
- Producers: Hirotaka Watanabe; Daisuke Uchiyama
- Artist: Yoshiyuki Sadamoto
- Writer: Kazunori Itō
- Composer: Chikayo Fukuda
- Platform: PlayStation 2
- Original release: Infection: JP: June 20, 2002; NA: February 11, 2003; PAL: March 26, 2004; Mutation: JP: September 19, 2002; NA: May 6, 2003; PAL: June 18, 2004; Outbreak: JP: December 12, 2002; NA: September 9, 2003; PAL: September 10, 2004; Quarantine: JP: April 10, 2003; NA: January 13, 2004; PAL: December 10, 2004; frägment: JP: November 23, 2005
- Parent series: anime series
- Spin-offs: G.U. Link

.hack (/dɒt hæk/) is a series of single-player action role-playing video games developed by CyberConnect2 and published by Bandai for the PlayStation 2. The four games, .hack//Infection, .hack//Mutation, .hack//Outbreak, and .hack//Quarantine, all feature a "game within a game", a fictional massively multiplayer online role-playing game (MMORPG) called The World which does not require the player to connect to the Internet. Players may transfer their characters and data between games in the series. Each game comes with an extra DVD containing an episode of .hack//Liminality, the accompanying original video animation (OVA) series which details fictional events that occur concurrently with the games.

The games are part of a multimedia franchise called Project .hack, which explores the mysterious origins of The World. Set after the events of the anime series, .hack//Sign, the games focus on a player character named Kite and his quest to discover why some users have become comatose in the real world as a result of playing The World. The search evolves into a deeper investigation of the game and its effects on the stability of the Internet.

Critics gave the series mixed reviews. It was praised for its unique setting and its commitment to preserve the suspension of disbelief, as well as the character designs. Simultaneously, it was criticized for uneven pacing and a lack of improvement between games in the series. The commercial success of the franchise led to the production of .hack//frägment—a Japan-only remake of the series with online capabilities—and .hack//G.U., another video game trilogy which was released for the PlayStation 2 between 2006 and 2007.

== Gameplay ==
The player's party, consisting of Kite, BlackRose, and Wiseman, is battling a monster. The red reticle shows which enemy is currently being targeted. Players may attack in real time by pressing the X button.

.hack simulates an MMORPG; players assume the role of a participant in a fictional game called The World. The player controls the on-screen player character Kite from a third-person perspective but first-person mode is available. The player manually controls the viewing perspective using the game controller. Within the fictional game, players explore monster-infested fields and dungeons, and "Root Towns" that are free of combat. They can also log off from The World and return to a computer desktop interface which includes in-game e-mail, news, message boards, and desktop and background music customization options. The player may save the game to a memory card both from the desktop and within The World at a Save Shop. A Data Flag appears on the save file after the player completes the game, allowing the transfer of all aspects of the player character and party members to the next game in the series.

The series is typical of action role-playing games, in which players attack enemies in real time. The game's action pauses whenever the menu is opened to select magic to cast, items to use, or skills to perform. The player directly controls Kite and the other characters are controlled by artificial intelligence. The player may either provide the computer-controlled characters with guidelines ("attack", "first aid", "magic", etc.) or issue direct commands. Most hostile creatures are contained within magic portals and combat will not begin until the player character approaches the portal and releases the monsters inside. Kite possesses a unique ability called "Data Drain" which allows him to transform these enemies into rare items. Many boss monsters are known as "Data Bugs"—enemies with corrupted data which gives them infinite health. Data Drain is used to repair the damaged monsters' data and render them vulnerable but its use increases Kite's level of infection, randomly causing harmful side effects. The infection can be cured by defeating enemies without Data Drain.

Root Towns are non-combat areas of The World where the player may restock items, buy equipment, or chat and trade with other players of The World. In many towns, the player may also raise a sentient, pig-like creature called a Grunty, which can be ridden in fields and in later games raced for prizes. A blue portal called the Chaos Gate is used to travel between towns (called "servers") and to access the fields and dungeons where battles occur. A three-word password system controls the characteristics of each area; attributes such as the prevalence of monsters or items change depending on the properties of each word in the password phrase. Certain plot-related areas have restricted access, but the player character has an ability called "Gate Hacking" which allows him to access these areas using "Virus Cores" obtained through Data Drain.

== Plot ==
=== Setting ===
The .hack games are set in an alternate history Earth, in the year 2010. After a computer virus called "Pluto's Kiss" crashes nearly every computer in the world, access to the Internet is closed to the general public to address security concerns. After two years without the Internet and online games, a MMORPG called The World is released. It becomes the most popular online game of all time with over 20 million unique players. Shortly before the events portrayed in the .hack games, a number of users become comatose as a result of playing The World. However, the developers blame their condition on cyberterrorism.

The World was developed by a German programmer named Harald Hoerwick; its backstory is based on the Epitaph of Twilight, an epic poem by Emma Wielant. Her death inspired Hoerwick to create the game. Elements of the poem are coded into the game's programming. The hidden purpose of Hoerwick's game is to develop the ultimate artificial intelligence (AI), which is capable of making decisions for itself. To this end, Hoerwick inserted functions into the system which monitor and extract behavioral data from millions of the game's players to aid in the AI's learning process. After Hoerwick's death, these pieces of code became black boxes to the current developers, who cannot fathom their purpose, yet are critical to the proper functioning of the game.

=== Characters ===
The main protagonist of .hack is Kite, a new player of The World whose friend Orca becomes comatose under mysterious circumstances. Kite is joined by nearly twenty other players in his quest to solve the mystery of the coma victims. The players who have the greatest impact on the success of Kite's mission are BlackRose, a fellow newbie to The World whose brother is also in a coma; Balmung, a legendary player who seeks to eliminate sources of corruption in the game he loves; and Wiseman, an information broker who becomes a key strategist for Kite's team. Helba, a professional hacker, and Lios, a reluctant system administrator, also aid in Kite's efforts to rescue the coma victims. Two non-human characters play important roles in the story: Aura seeks to complete her growth into the ultimate AI, while Morganna, an AI who rebels against her task of nurturing Aura, acts as the unseen primary antagonist.

=== Story ===
In .hack//Infection, Kite's friend Orca invites him to play The World. In the first dungeon they visit, they encounter a girl in white, Aura, being chased by a humanoid monster. Aura tries to entrust Orca with an item called "the Book of Twilight", but the monster attacks him, crashing The World's servers. Kite's player discovers that Yasuhiko, Orca's player, has fallen comatose after the attack, and resolves to discover the cause. Kite meets BlackRose, who takes him to a cathedral where they are attacked by a headless swordsman. The legendary player Balmung appears and defeats it, but the monster revives itself as a Data Bug. The Book of Twilight then activates, altering Kite's character data and giving him the Twilight Bracelet. He uses its Data Drain to correct the swordsman's code, allowing Balmung to kill it. Balmung accuses Kite of causing the viral infection spreading through the game, and leaves. Kite and BlackRose decide to cooperate to help the coma victims. After investigating a number of leads, Kite and BlackRose track down Skeith, the creature that put Orca into a coma. They defeat Skeith. The remnants of Skeith attracts a much larger enemy named Cubia, which defeats Kite and his party. Helba then drives Cubia away.

In .hack//Mutation, Kite and BlackRose encounter system administrator Lios, who declares Kite's bracelet to be an illegal hack. He tries to delete Kite's character data, but fails due to Kite's data being encrypted by the Book of Twilight. Helba intervenes, and convinces Lios to observe Kite for the time being. Lios directs them to an area where they find Innis, a monster with powers similar to Skeith's. Upon defeating Innis, Kite receives an e-mail from Aura, who reveals that she is an AI. They travel to an area to meet her; but Cubia attacks them, and they repel the monster with difficulty. Short on leads, they contact Wiseman, who is intrigued by Kite's bracelet. He suggests that Skeith and Innis are based on the "Cursed Wave", an antagonistic force featured in the poem Epitaph of Twilight, upon which The World is based. Wiseman helps grant them access to Net Slum, a place known as a paradise for hackers and wandering AIs. Upon arrival, another Cursed Wave monster called Magus attacks them. They defeat it and return to the Root Town, where they discover that the computer virus has spread to The World's main servers and into the real world.

In .hack//Outbreak, Balmung realizes that he cannot end the situation on his own, and joins Kite's quest. BlackRose tells Kite that her brother became comatose under similar circumstances as Orca, which renews both characters' determination. Wiseman formulates a plan to combat the Cursed Wave, enlisting Helba's assistance. Their teamwork destroys the Wave monster Fidchell, but the aftermath causes networks in the real world to malfunction. Aura contacts Kite again, but their meeting is cut short by Cubia's reappearance. Lios, observing Cubia's power, agrees to join Kite, Helba, and the others to combat the Cursed Wave. In the resulting operation, the team pools their resources to defeat another Wave monster called Gorre, with no repercussions in the real world.

.hack//Quarantine sees the current server becoming increasingly unstable. To fix the problem, Helba replaces it with a copy of the Net Slum. At the bottom of a dungeon, Kite encounters Mia, a member of his party. He discovers that Mia is actually another Cursed Wave monster named Macha, whom he reluctantly defeats. Meanwhile, Cubia grows stronger, and Kite's team barely fends off its latest attack. In contrast, Operation Orca is a success as they destroy Tarvos, the next Wave monster. Kite seeks the advice of Harald Hoerwick, the creator of the game who survives beyond death through his AI incarnations. Aura appears and hints that Cubia is the "shadow" of Kite's Twilight Bracelet. Cubia ambushes them and destroys the AI Harald. In their final battle, Kite recalls Aura's hint and has BlackRose destroy the bracelet, causing Cubia to fade away. Without the bracelet, the final Wave member, Corbenik, ambushes the party in Net Slum Root Town. With the aid of the spirits of the coma victims, Kite penetrates Corbenik's barrier. Aura sacrifices herself to end the battle, restoring the network to normal and reviving all the coma victims.

== Development ==
Release timeline
2002	.hack//INFECTION - Part 1 (PS2)
2002	.hack//MUTATION - Part 2 (PS2)
2002	.hack//OUTBREAK - Part 3 (PS2)
2003	.hack//QUARANTINE - Part 4 (PS2)
2004
2005	.hack//frägment (PS2/PC)
2006	.hack//G.U. Vol. 1: Rebirth (PS2)
2006	.hack//G.U. Vol. 2: Reminisce (PS2)
2007	.hack//G.U. Vol. 3: Redemption (PS2)
2008
2009
2010	.hack//Link (PSP)
2011
2012	.hack//Versus (PS3)
2013
2014
2015
2016
2017	.hack//G.U. Last Recode (PS4/PC)

Development for .hack began in early 2000 with the aim of shocking and surprising the player and creating a distinctive product. CyberConnect2's president Hiroshi Matsuyama played a key role in developing the concept for the series. A number of core ideas, including "slaying dragons or being a thief in London" were explored, but these were rejected in favor of an "offline/online game". Matsuyama said that this would give young gamers an opportunity to experience online play without paying monthly fees or needing powerful Internet connections. The developers looked at a number of MMORPGs such as Phantasy Star Online, Ultima Online, and Final Fantasy XI for inspiration, and drew influences from the prior works of character designer Yoshiyuki Sadamoto (Neon Genesis Evangelion) and scenario writer Kazunori Itō (Ghost in the Shell). Itō noted that casting the player into the role of a subscriber of The World creates a unique story-telling situation which draws the player deeper into the plot.

From the start of its development, .hack was envisioned as a four-part series intended to mirror the four-volume story arcs found in manga. Matsuyama theorized that the act of transferring saved data across the four volumes would help to create a sense of the human drama embodied by the games' story and invest the player into the narrative. The games were developed simultaneously alongside other elements of Project .hack such as .hack//Sign to emphasize the multimedia aspect of the franchise. The three-month gap between each game's release allowed the developers to make minor changes in response to criticisms. The games were packaged with bonus DVDs featuring episodes of .hack//Liminality, an original video animation (OVA) series that depicts events that occur concurrently with the games. The developers intended the OVA series to depict fictional events happening in the real world outside the game. Players in Japan who purchased all four games were rewarded with .hack//Gift, an OVA parodying the .hack series. After the completion of the series, the development team produced .hack//frägment, a game using the same engine as the .hack series with an online multiplayer component. The aims of .hack//frägment were to allow the developers to watch player interactions in an online environment and to gauge interest in an online .hack game.

== Reception ==
Aggregate review scores
Game	Metacritic
Infection	75/100
Mutation	76/100
Outbreak	70/100
Quarantine	70/100

By April 2004, the games had sold 1 million units in Japan and the United States. By March 2004, sales of the .hack games exceeded 1.73 million, with 780,000 copies sold in Japan.

Critics gave the series mixed reviews. .hack//Infection received the most positive reviews of the series; critics were intrigued by the games' unique premise. Jeremy Dunham of IGN was impressed by the game's commitment to preserve the illusion of online and praised the character designs and the inclusion of the Japanese voice track, but criticized the camera manipulation and the game's shortness and lack of difficulty. A Game Informer reviewer praised the way it captures the sense of community that a real MMORPG offers.

Many reviewers cited the game's unusual setting as the counterbalance to the mediocre gameplay, repetitive environments and poor camera control. Overall, the first game was moderately well received, with reviewers overlooking gameplay flaws because of a compelling story. Christian Nutt of GameSpy awarded if four stars out of five and commended Bandai for breaking new ground and Cyber Connect 2 for providing an engrossing RPG experience. Gary Steinman of Official U.S. PlayStation Magazine wrote, "[a]t its core, .hack is not a good game", calling the battle systems "wildly unbalanced" and the graphics "spectacularly underwhelming", but said the "mind-bending" story allowed him to look past its obvious flaws and anticipate future games in the series. Greg Kasavin of GameSpot was less forgiving, deriding .hack//Infection as a sub-par version of Kingdom Hearts.

.hack//Mutation also received mixed reviews, and many critics complained that little was done to address the problems of its predecessor. Fennec Fox of Gamepro said that game, "is simply an extension of Infection", with "muddy graphics, questionable control, and a story concept that's just interesting enough to keep you going." Greg Kasavin of GameSpot gave it a rating of 6.7 out of 10 and wrote, "not only does it bring you exactly the same sort of repetitive hack-and-slash gameplay, but it's also similarly short and simple and once again offers little in the way of plot or character development." Nutt found the second game to be more addictive than the first, despite its numerous shortcomings such as obvious padding towards the end of the story. He praised the "mixture of cool story and viscerally engaging RPG gameplay", the accelerating story, gameplay progression and memorable boss battles. Other reviewers were encouraged by the MMORPG-oriented details that contribute to the game's presentation and built excitement for the future of the series. IGN also named .hack//Mutation as PlayStation 2 Game of the Month for May 2003.

.hack//Outbreak represented a shift in the critical reception of the series as reviewers grew tired of the incremental or nonexistent improvements between titles. Kasavin rated it 6.4 out of 10, and wrote that it "just doesn't make for a satisfying experience". Dunham gave it an overall rating of 8.4 out of 10, praised the battle system and wrote that there had been a great improvement in the artificial intelligence of ally characters and enemies, although he was disappointed by the lack of any other changes. Nutt awarded .hack//Outbreak three stars out of five, writing that the game's "extremely challenging enemies and lots of solo missions give the game an edge that keeps it from becoming boring". However, he criticized the four-part game structure, observing, "we are paying Bandai $200 for one game" and that "the extreme lack of improvements from volume to volume is ... downright exploitative of the fans".

Some critics called the final game, .hack//Quarantine, a satisfying conclusion to a mediocre series, while others said it is a confusing mess of poor pacing and plot holes. Dunham awarded the game 8.3 out of 10 and called the plot twists "shocking and clever". Kasavin rated it 6.1 out of 10 and wrote that, "[o]n its own merits, Quarantine isn't a bad game, and [loyal players] should find it to have a satisfying conclusion that, sure enough, leaves the possibility for further adventures in The World". He also called Bandai's decision to add 60 to 80 hours of padding to the game, split it into four full-priced products, and release these as a series disappointing. Nutt was similarly disappointed with the final game, awarding it two stars out of five. He wrote that the story was well-presented and excellent, but that it was only present in the game's first and last quarters. He was satisfied by the game's ending and loved its story, style, and characters, but grew tired of the game's "endless chains of chambers, these easily-defeated enemies, this total lack of strategy". The Game Informer reviewer hoped to see a more effective implementation of .hack's concept in the future. Japanese magazine Famitsu Weekly gave the .hack games scores in the 29 to 30 out of 40 range, indicating average reviews. However, the Japanese Computer Entertainment Supplier's Association (CESA) honored the series for its combination of different fictional media including games, anime, radio, and manga into a compelling whole at the 2002–2003 CESA Awards.

== Related media and legacy ==
The .hack video games are part of a multimedia franchise that includes novels, manga, and anime series. Set before the events of the video games, .hack//Sign is an anime television series that establishes The World as a setting. .hack//Another Birth is a series of novels that retells the story of the games from BlackRose's perspective. .hack//XXXX is a manga adaptation of the games' story with changes to some elements, such as Cubia acting as a player character. The first official sequel to the games is the manga and anime series .hack//Legend of the Twilight, which began serializing on July 30, 2002. It tells the story of Shugo and Rena—regular players who win avatars of Kite and BlackRose in a contest—and their exploration of The World and its secrets. .hack//G.U. is a series of video games also released in multiple parts that forms the centerpiece of .hack Conglomerate, a new project set seven years after the events of Project .hack with a new version of The World.

=== Music ===
.hack//Game Music Perfect Collection

Soundtrack album by Chikayo Fukuda
- Released: JP: April 23, 2003; NA: March 16, 2004
- Genre: Video game soundtrack
- Length: Disc 1: 68:50; Disc 2: 71:27: NA: 69:08
- Label: JP: Victor Entertainment

The games' soundtrack, titled .hack//Game Music Perfect Collection, was released as a double album in Japan on April 23, 2003. It features 68 compositions by Chikayo Fukuda, Seizo Nakata, and Norikatsu Fukuda. A special edition of this soundtrack includes a third disc featuring sound effects and clips used in the games. The album was released with fewer tracks in North America as .hack//Game Music Best Collection. Patrick Gann of RPGFan wrote that the second disc, which contains music for cutscenes and special events, was stronger than the first disc's generic town and battle themes. He called the soundtrack "techno meets opera", singled out the volume intro tracks for particular praise. Gann noted that the North American release functions as a "Best of" album, but felt that "a lot of solid music [is] missing" in this release. Other reviewers were less enthusiastic; Paul Koehler of RPGamer called the music "particularly bland" and IGN's Dunham lamented that the second installment did not introduce many new pieces. However, he concluded that "the melodious piano and oboe themes were still brawny enough to convince us that we needed to buy the soundtrack sometime in the near future".

.hack//Game Music Perfect Collection

Disc 1
No.	Title	Length
1.	"Title"	0:47
2.	"Desktop"	1:41
3.	""The World" Top Page"	1:32
4.	"Δ Server Aqua Capital Mac Anu"	2:14
5.	"Θ Server Highland City Dun Loireag"	2:24
6.	"Λ Server Cultural City Carmina Gadelica"	2:07
7.	"Σ Server Aerial City Fort Ouph"	2:10
8.	"Ω Server Relic City Lia Fail"	1:49
9.	"Puchiguso Farm"	1:24
10.	"Prairie Rain Field Normal ~ Battle"	2:22
11.	"Wasteland Field Normal ~ Battle"	2:37
12.	"Earth Field Normal ~ Battle"	2:09
13.	"Wilderness Field Normal ~ Battle"	3:09
14.	"Snowfield Night Field Normal ~ Battle"	2:37
15.	"Desert Field Normal ~ Battle"	2:43
16.	"Scorching Field Normal ~ Battle"	2:15
17.	"Forest Field Normal ~ Battle"	2:32
18.	"Stone Wall Dungeon Normal ~ Battle"	2:41
19.	"Cave Dungeon Normal ~ Battle"	2:44
20.	"Castle Dungeon Normal ~ Battle"	2:18
21.	"Flesh Wall Dungeon Battle"	1:37
22.	"Phase 1: Skeith"	2:37
23.	"Phase 2: Innis"	2:27
24.	"Phase 3: Magus"	2:21
25.	"Phase 4: Fidchell"	2:29
26.	"Phase 5: Gorre"	2:22
27.	"Phase 6: Macha"	2:37
28.	"Phase 7: Tarvos"	2:37
29.	"Phase 8: Corbenik (Stage 1~2)"	2:54
30.	"Phase 8: Corbenik (Stage 3)"	2:34

Disc 2
No.	Title	Length
1.	"Vol. 1 Opening"	1:33
2.	"Aura's Theme"	2:52
3.	"BlackRose's Theme"	1:59
4.	"Hidden Forbidden Holy Ground"	1:01
5.	"First Time at the Holy Ground with BlackRose"	1:51
6.	"Balmung's Entry and the Virus Bug"	2:11
7.	"Mia's Theme"	1:10
8.	"Piros' Theme"	1:32
9.	"Cubia's Birth"	1:28
10.	"Vol 1. ~ Vol. 3 Staff Roll"	4:04
11.	"Airship Brigade"	1:33
12.	"800 Significant Seasons Bonus Track: Panta"	1:36
13.	"Vol. 2 Opening"	1:33
14.	"Vol. 1 Recollection (Cubia's Birth)"	1:14
15.	"Lios ~ Helba"	2:33
16.	"Net Slum"	1:41
17.	"Aura and Cubia"	0:53
18.	"Cubia - Stages 1~3"	2:20
19.	"Inverted Castle City"	1:31
20.	"Inverted Castle City ~ Angolmore"	1:17
21.	"800 Significant Seasons Bonus Track: Tempest"	1:38
22.	"Vol. 3 Opening"	1:30
23.	"Kite and Blackrose in Λ Town"	1:36
24.	"Sora and Skeith"	0:56
25.	"Puchiguso's Theme"	1:32
26.	"Puchiguso's Race Victory Melody"	0:42
27.	"Flying Creature"	1:34
28.	"800 Significant Seasons Bonus Track: Cyan and Princess Teria"	2:07
29.	"Vol. 4 Opening"	1:29
30.	"Macha's Appearance"	1:10
31.	"Mia's Death"	1:59
32.	"Cubia Stage 4"	2:15
33.	"Drain Heart"	2:52
34.	"Ending"	2:55
35.	"Vol. 4 Staff Roll"	3:11
36.	"Recurring Illusions of Mia's Resurrection"	3:14
37.	"800 Significant Seasons Bonus Track: Tail Concerto"	2:30
38.	"800 Significant Seasons Bonus Track: .hack Mix"	2:23

.hack//Game Music Best Collection

No.	Title	Length
1.	"Δ Server Aqua Capital Mac Anu"	2:12
2.	"Prairie Rain Field Normal ~ Battle"	2:20
3.	"Aura's Theme"	2:49
4.	"BlackRose's Theme"	1:57
5.	"Hidden Forbidden Holy Ground"	0:59
6.	"Balmung's Entry and the Virus Bug"	2:09
7.	"Mia's Theme"	1:07
8.	"Piros' Theme"	1:30
9.	"Θ Server Highland City Dun Loireag"	2:22
10.	"Phase 1: Skeith"	2:35
11.	"Vol. 1 Recollection (Cubia's Birth)"	1:11
12.	"Lios ~ Helba"	2:30
13.	"Phase 2: Innis"	2:25
14.	"Λ Server Cultural City Carmina Gadelica"	2:04
15.	"Forest Field Normal ~ Battle"	2:29
16.	"Net Slum"	1:39
17.	"Phase 3: Magus"	2:18
18.	"Σ Server Aerial City Fort Ouph"	2:08
19.	"Phase 4: Fidchell"	2:26
20.	"Puchiguso's Theme"	1:29
21.	"Phase 5: Gorre"	2:20
22.	"Macha's Appearance"	1:09
23.	"Phase 6: Macha"	2:35
24.	"Ω Server Relic City Lia Fail"	1:46
25.	"Cubia Stage 4"	2:14
26.	"Phase 7: Tarvos"	2:34
27.	"Phase 8: Corbenik (Stage 1~2)"	2:51
28.	"Drain Heart"	2:48
29.	"Ending"	2:52
30.	"Vol. 4 Staff Roll"	3:09
31.	"Recurring Illusions of Mia's Resurrection"	3:10

=== .Hack//frägment ===
.hack//frägment is a multiplayer online game based on the fictional MMORPG, The World. It was released only in Japan on November 23, 2005 and online service ended on January 18, 2007, after being extended two months because of its popularity. Famitsu Weekly gave .hack//frägment a cumulative score of 29 out of 40 over four reviews, much like its reviews of the main series. The game was never released outside of Japan because it was only intended for a Japanese audience. The game uses a modified version of the engine used in the .hack video game series and thus its gameplay differs from those games in a few ways. Players explore areas and fight monsters in real time but the game does not pause when the menu is opened. Due to this change it is now possible to assign items, messages and skills to hotkeys like in many other online games. Players may still use the skill "Data Drain" to weaken monsters and collect rare items. The user interface and control scheme are otherwise mostly unchanged.

Players may create their characters based on a number of preset body shapes and color schemes and may choose a class (such as Wavemaster or Twin Blade), character name and bonus stat points. In online mode, players may enter a lobby and search for a maximum of two other players to join them on an adventure. The game includes an expanded communication interface that allows players to chat, send e-mail, post to an in-game Bulletin Board System, and receive server news updates. It is possible to establish ad hoc chat rooms separate from the public-access ones. Guilds are permanent, exclusive chat rooms for members, and can also be used to set up a storefront to sell items to online players.

In offline mode, players may use the same character that they use for online mode, and any skills, items and levels they gain will carry over into online mode. Players may invite or create characters from the .hack games, .hack//Sign, and .hack//Legend of the Twilight into their party. The "story mode" of .hack//frägment is similar to that of the .hack games, though it does not feature any of the antagonists from the original games, and the scenario is an entirely non-canon what-if story.

Players may also install a companion program on their PC called "Area Server", which allows them to create fields and dungeons for players to visit online. As players clear fields and dungeons on a user's Area Server, the Area Server gains experience points and levels. Once the server reaches a certain level, it is possible for custom areas to become "corrupted", much like in the events of the .hack games. Players can visit a corrupted area by breaking into it with virus cores obtained from using the Data Drain skill on enemies, and can defeat a data bug boss enemy at the bottom of the corrupted dungeon. Once the boss monster has been defeated, the area corruption is cleared.

Since the game's official online service was closed in 2007, a private server has been created by fans of the game, along with a fan translation into English.
