= Hiroshi Morioka =

Japanese anime director and artist

Hiroshi Morioka (守岡博)
- Occupations: Anime director and artist
- Employer: Bee Train

Hiroshi Morioka (守岡博, Morioka Hiroshi) is a Japanese anime director and artist. Primarily working alongside director Koichi Mashimo at Bee Train animation studio, he's come on scene in his work with some notable productions by Bee Train including the anime adaptation of Clamp's Tsubasa Chronicle and the third segment Field Test in Batman: Gotham Knight.

== Filmography ==
=== Director ===
- Hyouge Mono: Episode Director
- Hanasaku Iroha: Episode Director
- Psychic Detective Yakumo: Episode Director
- Phantom ~Requiem for the Phantom~: Episode Director
- Blade of the Immortal: Episode Director
- Batman: Gotham Knight Segment Field Test
- El Cazador de la Bruja: Episode Director
- Tsubasa Chronicle: Co-General Director for season 2 and Episode Director for both seasons
- Spider Riders: Episode Director
- Madlax: Episode Director
- Meine Liebe: Episode Director
- Metabots: Episode Director
- Avenger
- .hack//Liminality: Episode Director for Volume 3
- .hack//SIGN: Episode director
- Bakusou Kyoudai Let's & Go: Episode Director

=== Assistant and Unit Director ===
- Tsubasa Chronicle: Assistant Director
- Avenger: Unit Director
- .hack//Legend of the Twilight: Unit Director
- .hack//SIGN: Unit Director
- You're Under Arrest!: Unit Director

=== Storyboard Artist ===
- Hyouge Mono
- Psychic Detective Yakumo
- Phantom ~Requiem for the Phantom~
- Blade of the Immortal
- Murder Princess
- Tsubasa Chronicle
- IGPX: Immortal Grand Prix
- Scrapped Princess
- Madlax
- Immortal Grand Prix
- NieA under 7

=== Animation Director ===
- Batman: Gotham Knight Segment Field Test
- IGPX: Immortal Grand Prix

=== Sound Department ===
- You're Under Arrest!: Voice director
