= Bee Train Production =

Japanese animation studio

BEE TRAIN Production Inc.
- Native name: ビィートレイン株式会社
- Type: Kabushiki kaisha Animation studio
- Industry: Animation (Anime)
- Genre: various
- Founded: Tokyo, Japan June 5, 1997
- Founder: Kōichi Mashimo
- Headquarters: Kichijōji, Musashino, Tokyo, Japan
- Number of locations: 3 (Kokubunji, Kichijōji, Karuizawa)
- Key people: Kōichi Mashimo, CEO; Kenji Horikawa, Director
- Products: Arc the Lad (1999); Noir (2001); .hack//Sign (2002); Madlax (2004); Tsubasa Chronicle (2005–06); .hack//Roots (2006); El Cazador de la Bruja (2007)
- Total equity: ¥10,000,000
- Number of employees: 70 (April 2007)
- Parent: Production I.G (1997–2006)
- Divisions: Bee Train Digital (defunct); Studio Road; C-Station (2009–12); D-Station (defunct)

Bee Train Production (ビィートレイン株式会社, Biītorein Kabushikigaisha), commonly referred to simply as Bee Train, is a Japanese animation studio founded by Kōichi Mashimo in 1997. Since their involvement with Noir, .hack//Sign, and Madlax (among other series) they have a strong following in the yuri fandom for being involved in series portraying strong female leads with speculatively ambiguous relationships.

== History ==
The studio Bee Train was founded on June 5, 1997, by Kōichi Mashimo, who was previously a director at Tatsunoko Productions and the founder of Mashimo Jimusho, a small freelance staff working for other studios. Originally, Bee Train was a subsidiary of Production I.G along with Xebec but in February 2006, it ended its relationship and became independent.

Koichi Mashimo's goal when he founded Bee Train was to create a "hospital for animators", an animation studio interested in nurturing young talents and artistic quality of production rather than in corporate strategies and profit. This studio-as-hospital approach was allegedly invented by Mashimo during his prolonged stay in an intensive care unit (after a severe skiing accident) and has been Bee Train's official strategy ever since.

The first projects published by the studio in 1999 were anime adaptations of video game franchises popular in Japan: PoPoLoCrois, Arc the Lad, Wild Arms: Twilight Venom, and Medabots. Later, Bandai Visual joined forces with Bee Train to produce an anime OVA based on the famous .hack video game series. Simultaneously, they decided to promote the games with an anime television series, that aired in 2002 as .hack//Sign and is among Bee Train's most famous works. The OVA became known as .hack//Liminality and its four episodes were added as bonus material to each of the original four games of the franchise. In 2006, Bee Train produced .hack//Roots, a prequel anime to the .hack//G.U. games and a spiritual successor to Sign.

Bee Train's first independent project was Noir. Aired in 2001, the series was produced at the same time as Sign and became the first installment of Bee Train's "girls-with-guns" trilogy. After Noir had become widely successful in Japan, France, the United States, Germany, and other Western countries, the second series, Madlax, was produced in 2004 and the third, El Cazador de la Bruja, went on air in April 2007. Although the "girls-with-guns" series are considered Bee Train's and, particularly, Mashimo's signature works, the original idea belonged to their common executive producer Shigeru Kitayama.

From 1997 on, the studio's headquarters were located in Kokubunji, Tokyo, although in 2001, it moved to another part of the city. Two more studio locations were acquired in 2004 (in Karuizawa, Nagano) and 2006 (Kichijōji, Musashino, Tokyo).

The company has been dormant since 2012 due to Kōichi Mashimo's retirement from the anime industry. The official website was removed in 2024.

== Style ==
One frequent technique that Mashimo uses as part of his studio-as-hospital strategy is brainstorming new anime concepts with his colleagues in the state of alcohol intoxication. For example, according to him, that is how the idea of the supernatural connection between the two female leads of Madlax was born.

Another typical Bee Train gesture is to invite Japanese voice actors who have already worked on some of their projects to voice the characters similar to the ones they voiced before. For example, this list includes Hōko Kuwashima (Kirika Yuumura in Noir, Margaret Burton in Madlax), Aya Hisakawa (Chloe, Limelda Jorg, Jodie Hayward in El Cazador de la Bruja), and Kaori Nazuka (Subaru in .hack//Sign, Shino in .hack//Roots).

The famous Japanese composer and music producer Yuki Kajiura has created musical scores for multiple projects by Bee Train since Noir (whose appeal lay to a large degree in its soundtrack). Kajiura has provided music for Sign, Liminality, Madlax (as part of FictionJunction Yuuka), Tsubasa Chronicle, and recently El Cazador de la Bruja. When explaining his preference for Kajiura's work, Mashimo once commented that "she's a storyteller who just happens to know how to write music". Another frequent collaboration is that between Bee Train and the musical duo Ali Project (Noir, Avenger, .hack//Roots). Generally, the music plays a just as important role in Bee Train's works as visuals and dialogue do, sometimes even drowning the latter (heard, for example, in .hack//Sign, Avenger, and Madlax).

== Works ==
=== In the works ===
Year	Title	Type	Eps	Director	Writer	Composer
1999	Popolocrois Monogatari	TV	25	Kōichi Mashimo	Aya Matsui	Kow Otani
1999	Arc the Lad	TV	26	Itsuro Kawasaki	Akemi Omode	Michiru Oshima
1999	Wild Arms: Twilight Venom	TV	22	Itsuro Kawasaki	Hideki Mitsui; Itsuro Kawasaki; Aya Matsui; Akemi Omode; Chinatsu Houjou; Hideki Mitsui; Kenji Kamiyama	Kow Otani
1999	Medabots (first season)	TV	52	Tensai Okamura	Ryōta Yamaguchi	Osamu Tezuka
2001	Noir	TV	26	Kōichi Mashimo	Ryoe Tsukimura	Yuki Kajiura
2001	Captain Kuppa Desert Pirate	TV	26	Kōichi Mashimo	Kōichi Mashimo	Hayato Matsuo
2002	.hack//Sign	TV	26	Kōichi Mashimo	Kazunori Ito; Hiroaki Jinno; Kōichi Mashimo; Kirin Mori; Akemi Omode; Mitsuhiko Sawamura; Michiko Yokote	Yuki Kajiura
2002	.hack//Liminality	OVA	4	Kōichi Mashimo	Kazunori Ito	Yuki Kajiura
2002	.hack//Gift	OVA	1	Kōichi Mashimo	Kazunori Ito	Yuki Kajiura
2003	Avenger	TV	13	Kōichi Mashimo	Hidefumi Kimura	Ali Project
2003	.hack//Legend of the Twilight	TV	12	Kōichi Mashimo; Koji Sawai	Akatsuki Yamatoya; Satoru Nishizono	Yuji Yoshino; Yoko Ueno
2003	Immortal Grand Prix	TV	5	Kōichi Mashimo	Kōichi Mashimo; Yuki Arie	Fat Jon
2004	Madlax	TV	26	Kōichi Mashimo	Yōsuke Kuroda	Yuki Kajiura
2004	Meine Liebe	TV	13	Kōichi Mashimo	Akemi Omode	Yoshihisa Hirano
2005	Tsubasa Chronicle (first season)	TV	26	Kōichi Mashimo	Hiroyuki Kawasaki	Yuki Kajiura
2006	Meine Liebe wieder	TV	13	Shinya Kawamo	Akemi Omode	Yutaka Minobe
2006	.hack//Roots	TV	26	Kōichi Mashimo	Kazunori Ito; Miu Kawasaki	Ali Project
2006	Spider Riders	TV	52	Kōichi Mashimo; Takaaki Ishiyama	Yōsuke Kuroda	Fumitaka Anzai; Nobuhiko Nakayama
2006	Tsubasa Chronicle (second season)	TV	26	Kōichi Mashimo; Hiroshi Morioka	Hiroyuki Kawasaki	Yuki Kajiura
2007	Murder Princess	OVA	6	Tomoyuki Kurokawa	Tatsuhiko Urahata	Yasufumi Fukuda
2007	El Cazador de la Bruja	TV	26	Kōichi Mashimo	Kenichi Kanemaki	Yuki Kajiura
2007	Spider Riders: Yomigaeru Taiyou	TV	26	Kōichi Mashimo	Yōsuke Kuroda	Fumitaka Anzai; Nobuhiko Nakayama
2008	Blade of the Immortal	TV	13	Kōichi Mashimo	Hiroyuki Kawasaki	Kow Otani
2008	Batman Gotham Knight: Field Test	Video	1	Hiroshi Morioka	Jordan Goldberg	Christopher Drake
2009	Phantom ~Requiem for the Phantom~	TV	26	Kōichi Mashimo	Gen Urobuchi; Yōsuke Kuroda; Hideki Shirane; Noboru Kimura; Tatsuya Takahashi; Yukihito Nonaka	Hikaru Nanase
2010	Halo Legends: Homecoming	OVA/ONA	1	Koji Sawai	Hiroyuki Kawasaki	Martin O'Donnell
2010	Psychic Detective Yakumo	TV	13	Tomoyuki Kurokawa	Hiroyuki Kawasaki	R・O・N
2011	Hyouge Mono	TV	39	Koichi Mashimo	Hiroyuki Kawasaki	Kow Otani

== Other divisions ==
Bee Train Digital was Bee Train's small special effects and other works area that has mostly provided additional production support to projects such as effects, finishing and photography work for .hack//SIGN, .hack//Liminality, Avenger, and Murder Princess. It also created the special effects for Toaru Majutsu no Index and 2D works in ending theme of Canaan. Studio Road, which resides within the studio's offices, provides animation finishing services for Bee Train and several other studios. Through the 2009–2010 year, two new divisions were added. C-Station Department, which served as its animation design department and D-Station Department, which was reorganized from Bee Train Digital, is the digital production and digital photography works. In 2012, C-Station broke away from Bee Train becoming independent and D-Station has since been delisted by the company.
