= Kōichi Mashimo =

Japanese anime director

Kōichi Mashimo (真下 耕一)
- Born: June 21, 1952 (age 74); Tokyo, Japan
- Education: Sophia University
- Occupations: Anime director and screenwriter
- Years active: 1975–2012
- Known for: Bee Train animation studio

Kōichi Mashimo (真下 耕一, Mashimo Kōichi; sometimes credited as Kouchi Mashimo or Kouichi Mashimo) (born June 21, 1952) is a Japanese former anime director and the founder of the animation studio Bee Train. Since the creation of the studio, Mashimo directed or otherwise participated in a large number of the studio's works, for example, as a member of the art or sound department.

== Biography ==
Kōichi Mashimo was born in Tokyo, Japan and from his early years showed interest in photography, under the influence of his father. Mashimo studied jurisprudence at Sophia University and during his fourth university year, he participated in the making of several television commercials. However, this was a rather disappointing experience, and on November 6, 1975, he applied for a position of Hiroshi Sasagawa's assistant director in Tatsunoko Production. The first anime series he worked on was Time Bokan (1975–76).

In the mid-1980s, while still working for Tatsunoko, Mashimo survived a severe alpine skiing accident. During his stay in an intensive care unit, he came up with an idea of a "hospital for animators", an animation studio whose primary goal would be fostering and self-actualization of talented artists rather than commercial success and money. Some time after that, he founded a small freelance studio called Mashimo Jimusho that was mainly producing in-between animation for larger companies. In 1997, Mashimo presented his studio-as-hospital concept to Mitsuhisa Ishikawa, the president of Production I.G, who was so impressed with it that he immediately agreed to sponsor Mashimo. The new subsidiary has become known as Bee Train and in February 2006, it ended its relationship with I.G and became independent.

== Approach and style ==
Mashimo generally storyboards all the anime he directs. As one of the leading and only regular on-staff directors at Bee Train, most series are fully directed by him. As Bee Train has expanded, more directors have been able to handle episode direction under Mashimo's supervision, such as Tsubasa Chronicle.

Mashimo is known for frequently hiring Yuki Kajiura to compose for his projects. Their first project being Eat-Man, then going onto Noir, as well as .hack//Sign, Liminality, and Tsubasa Chronicle. Besides Kajiura, many Mashimo and Bee Train's projects bring back voice actors and crew members. Some noted cast members include: Maaya Sakamoto (.hack//SIGN, Blade of the Immortal, Tsubasa Chronicle), Sanae Kobayashi (Madlax, .hack//Roots, .hack//Liminality), as well as noted crew members such as character designer Minako Shiba, Satoshi Oshawa, and artist and director Kōji Sawai, as well as writers such as Hiroyuki Kawasaki.

Mashimo believes in giving music prominence in his works, rather than using it as background noise.

Some of Mashimo's major projects have featured strong female protagonists. The famous "girls with guns" trilogy (Noir, Madlax, El Cazador de la Bruja) have all featured female characters in lead roles. One of his earlier films, The Weathering Continent, also featured a young woman who takes matters into her own hands to save her people. Others such as Madlax have also been known to contain subtle hints at lesbian relations.

Mashimo once remarked that he would like to have met the photographers Richard Avedon, Jeanloup Sieff, and Helmut Newton and film directors John Ford and Alfred Hitchcock. Mashimo is particularly fond of the French movie Les Aventuriers (1967) and has even named a character in Madlax after the protagonist of that film.

== Filmography ==
Year	Anime	Job
1975	Time Bokan	Assistant director, episode director
1978	Gatchaman II	Director
1979	Gatchaman Fighter	Director
1981	Golden Warrior Gold Lightan	Chief director, episode director, storyboards
1981	Kaitei Daisensou: Ai no 20.000 Miles	Episode director
1983	Mirai Keisatsu Urashiman	Chief director
1985	Night on the Galactic Railroad	Storyboards
1986	Ai City	Director
1987	Dirty Pair: Project Eden	Director, general superintendent
1988	F	Director, script
1988	Dominion	Director, script, special advisor
1989	Dragon Warrior	Script
1990	Robin Hood no Daiboken	Director
1992	The Weathering Continent	Director, script
1993	The Irresponsible Captain Tylor	Director, episode director, script, supervisor, storyboard
1996	Sorcerer Hunters	Director
1997	Eat-Man	Director, storyboards, scripts
1998	Xenogears	Animation movie producer
1999	Arc the Lad	Special thanks
1999	Popolocrois	Director, script
1999	Wild Arms: Twilight Venom	Director, planning
2001	Noir	Director, storyboards, sound director, music director
2001	Captain Kuppa	Director, Series Composition
2002	.hack//Sign	Director, script, storyboards, sound director, soundtrack supervisor, off-line editor
2002	.hack OVAs: .hack//Intermezzo, .hack//Unison, .hack//Gift	Director, storyboard
2002	.hack//Liminality	Director, soundtrack supervision, animation director
2002	.hack//Infection	Staff member: Bee Train
2002	.hack//Mutation	Staff member: Bee Train
2002	.hack//Outbreak	Staff member: Bee Train
2002	Wild Arms 3	Event scene direction
2003	Avenger	Director
2003	.hack//Legend of the Twilight	Director, general superintendent
2003	.hack//Quarantine	Staff member: Bee Train
2003	Immortal Grand Prix	Director, script
2004	Madlax	Director, script, storyboards
2004	Ginyuu Mokushiroku Meine Liebe	Director, script
2005	Tsubasa Chronicle (first season)	Director, storyboards
2006	Ginyuu Mokushiroku Meine Liebe wieder	planner
2006	.hack//Roots	Director, supervision, soundtrack supervision, consulting producer
2006	.hack//G.U. vol. 1//Rebirth	Staff member: Bee Train (G.U. grand design)
2006	.hack//G.U. vol. 2//Reminisce	Staff member: Bee Train (G.U. grand design)
2006	Spider Riders	Director, storyboards
2006	Tsubasa Chronicle (second season)	Director (co-director: Hiroshi Morioka)
2007	.hack//G.U. vol. 3//Redemption	Staff member: Bee Train (G.U. grand design)
2007	El Cazador de la Bruja	Director, storyboards
2007	Spider Riders: Yomigaeru Taiyou	Director
2007	Murder Princess	Planner
2008	.hack//G.U. Returner	Director
2008	Blade of the Immortal	Director, storyboard artist (episode 1)
2008	Batman Gotham Knight: Field Test	Segment producer
2009	Phantom ~Requiem for the Phantom~	Director, storyboards (episode 1; ending animation #2)
2010	Halo Legends	Segment executive producer: Origins I Segment director: "Homecoming" (co-director Kōji Sawai)
2011	Hyouge Mono	Director, storyboard, episode director

== General references ==
- Katoh, Hidekazu (May 2007). "Tsubasa - Reservoir Chronicle". Newtype USA. Vol. 5, no. 5. A.D. Vision. pp. 26–33. ISSN 1541-4817.
- Yuki, Masahiro (May 2007). "The Official Art of .hack//Roots". Newtype USA. Vol. 5, no. 5. A.D. Vision. pp. 101–107. ISSN 1541-4817.
