= Koji Sawai =

Japanese anime director and artist

Kōji Sawai (澤井 幸次)
- Born: September 14, 1955 (age 71); Tokyo, Japan
- Education: Toyo University
- Occupations: Anime director and artist
- Employer: Tatsunoko Production (1980-1982?)
- Known for: Ranma ½ and .hack//Sign

Kōji Sawai (澤井 幸次, Sawai Kōji) is a Japanese anime director and artist known for directing Ranma ½ and .hack//Sign.

== Biography ==
Kōji Sawai was born on September 14, 1955, in Tokyo Japan. While attending Toyo University, Sawai had ambitions to become a manga artist and would later join Tatsunoko Productions as an artist and director, which would include working with Koichi Mashimo on The Irresponsible Captain Tylor, as well as other projects. After serving two years he left Tatsunoko to become a freelance director and has been working since.

== Filmography ==
Year	Anime	Job
1980s
1985	Shōwa Ahōzoshi Akanuke Ichiban!	director
1986	Maison Ikkoku	storyboard artist
1987	The Real Ghostbusters	storyboard artist
1988	F	director, script
1989	Mobile Police Patlabor	animation director
1990s
1990	Ranma ½	episode director, script, storyboard
1993	The Irresponsible Captain Tylor	episode director, storyboard
1994	The Irresponsible Captain Tylor (OAV)	episode director, storyboard (co-director Koichi Mashimo)
2000s
2002	.hack//Sign	episode director, storyboards
2003	Avenger	episode director, storyboard
2003	.hack//Legend of the Twilight	director, sound director, storyboards
2003	Trigun	Artist management
2003	Wolf's Rain	episode director
2003	Immortal Grand Prix	storyboard
2004	Madlax	episode director, storyboards
2004	Trigun	artist management
2005	Tsubasa Chronicle (first season)	episode director, storyboards
2006	.hack//Roots	episode director, storyboards
2006	Spider Riders	episode director, storyboards
2006	Tsubasa Chronicle (second season)	storyboards
2007	El Cazador de la Bruja	episode director, storyboards
2007	Spider Riders: Yomigaeru Taiyou	director
2008	.hack//G.U. Returner	storyboard
2008	Blade of the Immortal	episode director, storyboard artist
2009	Phantom ~Requiem for the Phantom~	episode director, storyboards
2010s
2010	Halo Legends	segment director and storyboard artist: "Homecoming" (co-director Koichi Mashimo)
2010	Psychic Detective Yakumo	storyboards and episode director
2011	Hyouge Mono	storyboards and episode director
2012	Hyouge Mono	storyboard and episode director
2020s
2023	The Misfit of Demon King Academy II	storyboard for episode 4
