= Popolocrois (TV series) =

Japanese anime television series

- First DVD cover

ポポロクロイス物語 (Poporokuroisu Monogatari)
- Genre: Sword and sorcery
- Created by: Yosuke Tamori
- Anime television series

Popolocrois Monogatari
- Directed by: Koichi Mashimo
- Produced by: Noriko Kobayashi; Tomiyo Hiruta
- Written by: Koichi Mashimo; Kenji Horikawa; Akemi Omode; Aya Matsui; Hideki Mitsui
- Music by: Kow Otani
- Studio: Bee Train; Production I.G
- Original network: TV Tokyo
- Original run: October 4, 1998 – March 28, 1999
- Episodes: 25
- Anime television series

PoPoLoCrois
- Directed by: Kazuhiro Ochi
- Produced by: Norio Yamakawa; Tetsuya Watanabe; Hideaki Miyamoto
- Written by: Reiko Yoshida
- Music by: Kōichirō Kameyama
- Studio: TMS Entertainment
- Original network: TV Tokyo
- Original run: October 5, 2003 – March 28, 2004
- Episodes: 26

Popolocrois Monogatari (Japanese: ポポロクロイス物語, Hepburn: Poporokuroisu Monogatari; "Popolocrois Story") is a Japanese animated anime television series, based on the manga series PopoloCrois created by Yohsuke Tamori, broadcast on TV Tokyo. There have been two different series, broadcast in 1998–1999 and 2003–2004. The first series is about the adventure after the defeat of the Ice Demon: a girl named "Hyuu" came to Popolocrois, and the second series is 15 years after Maira's defeat. The second anime series features brand new characters, along with some of the old ones.

The main character for the second series is Pinon, who is the son of Pietro and Narcia. The second series is based on the fourth PlayStation 2 game in Japan, PoPoLoCrois: Adventure of Beginnings (Japanese title: Popolocrois Hajimari no Bouken; official English Title: Popolocrois: A New Departure), and the fifth PlayStation 2 game Popolocrois: Law of the Moon Adventure (Japanese title: Popolocrois Tsuki no Okite no Bouken; official English title: Popolocrois: Enchanted Lunar Tale).

== Characters ==
=== First series ===
Pietro PakaPuka
Voiced by: Ai Orikasa
The son of the King of Popolocrois, King Paulo, and Sania, one of the daughters of the Ryu clan (which are dragons). He has blond hair, and unlike the game, he wears the clothes that he had in the first two PlayStation games, at the beginning of Popolocrois Monogatari II and in the beginning of the PSP game (with no cape and no crown). It seems like Pietro is still 10 years old rather than 12 because of his childish personality, but he cares deeply about the kingdom.
Narcia
Voiced by: Yuri Shiratori
She is able to fly without a broom and has a crush on Pietro, and she has less childish personality than Pietro in the beginning. Narcia is able to turn into Kai with her Golden Key, but even though they are the same person, they have split personality. Narcia turns into Kai when she is deeply shy or when she is too scared in some situation, but most of the time she prefers to be just herself.
Kai
Voiced by: Yuri Shiratori
Kai is a human-kind that Narcia can transform into, thanks to the help of the Golden Key. Kai shows up in the beginning of the first episode as "Tobikera", which is the stripped dragon form that it's shown from Kai's attack in the game "Dino". She has a complete personality change, it's very weird because she also refers herself as Narcia, so she speaks about all the things that Narcia knows in a different way.
Shirokishi
Voiced by: Masashi Ebara
Shirokishi literally translates to ¨White Knight¨. Shirokishi is first shown as he is traveling to find the King Knight Sword. Shirokishi speaks in an old-samurai dialect and shows great respect toward Pietro and Narcia. He is extremely skilled in swordsmanship despite his appearance, and also he's very kind and likes to help others (which was the main reason to help everyone he finds in trouble).
Hyuu
Voiced by: Eri Miyajima
She mysteriously appeared in Flornel Forest after GamiGami Maou (Japanese name for "GamiGami Devil") had failed to transfer his castle with Popolocrois castle, causing a mysterious beam to strike Flornel Forest which opened a way for Hyuu, Sanda, and Ston to come to Popolocrois. She has a blue hair with a pony tails on each side and one in the back, she has the mysterious "Wind-kind" crest in her chest. Hyuu is selfish and always state that wind-kinds should be alone and free, but she shows that she wants affection. She is "loved" by GamiGami because he is under a love spell toward Hyuu, but she actually wants to be with Pietro and actually wants to stay with him forever.
Sanda
Voiced by: Takashi Nagasako
Sanda (サンダ) is a little, fat pink monster that follows Hyuu, he seems to be fascinated by the new world he came into, especially by the food. Both Sanda and Ston are able to transform into giants, Sanda turns into a fat, outgoing giant that wears red Chinese clothes, and is able to create thunders just by the friction of his fingers and control them. Sanda also has the mysterious "Wind-kind" emblem. Sanda is supposed to be the Japanese pronunciation of "thunder".
Ston
Voiced by: Uchida Takeshi
Ston is a yellow, narrow monster that follows Hyuu, Ston always refers Hyuu as a "selfish little girl" but still follows her. Both Sanda and Ston are able to transform into giants, Ston turns into a tall, very pale giant that wears blue clothes, Ston is able to create Gusts by just blowing, and also he can create windstorms. Ston also has the mysterious "Wind-kind" emblem. Ston is supposed to be the Japanese pronunciation of "storm".
GamiGami Maou
Voiced by: Furuta Arata
Also known as GamiGami Devil. He lives in a swamp within his "junk castle", also with his humanlike robots. GamiGami tries to take over the Popolocrois kingdom (which he actually does later in the series), but Pietro and Narcia see GamiGami as a minor threat because of their previous adventures.

=== Second series ===
Pinon PakaPuka
Voiced by: Omi Minami
He has short vanilla white hair, wears a white shirt, pants, vest, with the PakaPuka Emblem, also carries around King Paulo's sword (later, he carries the dragon sword). He is the son of Pietro and Narcia and the new prince of Popolocrois, he is very passive in the beginning of the series and just want to read books and study in the castle rather than practice swordplay, go to school, and make friends. He is often compared to his father, Pietro, because everyone expects him to be as great as Pietro was when he was young, but Pinon hates the fact everyone is expecting too much from him. Later, Pinon becomes courageous and starts to stand up for himself, but gets a little discouraged in tough situations, but he is now a man with a strong heart and wants to be a king who can create a world without sadness. Pinon uses the power of the Wind Seirei to use a tornado attack (or an attack that resembles the "Wind Cutter"/"Kaze no Yaiba" tech) with his sword. At first he is not mastering it well, but he is able to use it consistently during the fight with Zephys. He actually falls for Luna at the first sight, and he accepts her identity as a water sprite. He is always the one who comfort her when she got very sad.
Luna (Lunattress Andolink)
Voiced by: Tomoe Hanba
She has a long aqua blue hair, wears a white dress along with a white bandana, and the Golden Key as her necklace. She was first shown when Pinon tried to save Papuu when it was stuck on a little island just off shore, Luna saved Pinon when he almost drowned. Luna seems to know about Pinon but Pinon has no idea why. Later on in the series, Luna reveals her true form when Pinon was once again drowning in the sea, a Mermaid-like Water Sprite. According to Pion (and Marco), when she is in her true form, she is very bright and beautiful. Luna is supposed to be the Princess of the Ocean Sprites but got into a fight with her mother, running away to the Popolocrois beach. Such caused Seilene, her mother to be possessed by Zephys. She is also very kind to others, even to the water sprites who serve her, and she loves them even if they were turned into dark sprites by Zephys. The fact that dark sprites can never turned back to once they were and her mother need to sacrifice herself to seal Zephys that saddens her very much, even after the incident, but she is OK now because Pinon always comfort her when she wanted to cry. She actually loves Pinon, knowing him since very small, and the prime reason she wants to be on land, and she sometimes get jealous when Punpun flirts with Pinon (which Pinon often reluctant to do so). In the last episode, she became the heir after her mother died, and she held hands with Pinon in the ending like Pinon's parents did.
Marco
Voiced by: Wataru Takagi
He wears a brown armless shirt, and has tanned skin with three white stripes on his face, a pony tailed hair pointing up, and carries a little axe. He is the son of Leona and quite possibly of the White Knight, he lives in the Flornel Forest, away from Takinen Village with his mother. He is not quite intelligent but still has guts to do something. Marco uses the power of the Fire Seirei to use a fire attack with his axe.
King Pietro
Voiced by: Akio Ōtsuka
Now the once crowned prince of Popolocrois has become the new king of the kingdom. Pietro has the same brown hair along with beards, he wears the crown of wisdom that was passed down to the kingdom, a dark olive robe with white outlines, with the Pakapuka emblem. Pietro is a strong and wise king like his father, and still the skilled swordsman he was. Now he lives with Narcia in the Kingdom.
Seirei
Seirei is compromised in kanji of "sei"(holy) + "rei"(spirit). There are 4 different elements: fire, water, earth and wind. One by one they all are threatened by the spirit of darkness (Yasm), but Pinon saves them from being sealed; they repay him by becoming weird animals and accompanying him. There is "Hirarin", the green "Cat-Bat", (Wind); "Bobo", the red "Pig-Bird" (Fire); and "Chappi", the blue creature (Water). After the first arc, the seirei just disappear and appear out of nowhere...
Prince Kogoto
Voiced by: Koki Miyata
He is an adopted child of GamiGami. He is an older brother of PunPun and respects GamiGami. His character looks like the GamiGami well. He builds a robot and plots world conquest.
Princess PunPun
Voiced by: Rumi Shishido
She is an adopted child of GamiGami. She is a younger sister of Kogoto and respects GamiGami. She is strong-minded and is irritable. She loves Pinon and always fights for her love (more like a fangirl) with Luna.
Sielene Andolink
Voiced by: Emi Shinohara
Seilene is the Queen of the Ocean Sprites, who is also the mother of Luna. Before the series begins, Luna wanted to venture onto the land. However, her mother refused because she wanted to shade her daughter from the law of the moon. However, her daughter disliked that and she ran away from home. Such have made a hole on her heart which then used by Zephys to possess her (however, she said it is her stubbornness that caused Zephys able to be possess her) after the defeat of Yasm. After being possessed, she cursed the whole population in Popolocrois (except the trio) to turn into stone under the control of Zephys. Then, she commended the trio who visited her to find the Moon Drop, which she later called Gaude and Pannya to steal it from the trio to her. Then, she arrived at the Petrification Island to undo the Law of the Moon in the Ephemeral Temple. After the abolishment of the Law of the Moon, Zephys left her body for the Ocean half and Sielene become unconscious. After being escorted back to the Croconesia, she came back to her senses and have a walk with Luna on the land for the first and only time. She was astonished and happy to see that her daughter has become stronger and kinder than before she walked on the land. In the final battle with Zephys, Sielene choose to sacrifice herself to reinstate the Law of the Moon in the Aventurine Temple, which has become her resting place because the slab in the Petrification Island stated that the one who commit a sin must atone for it inside the temple walls.
Yasm
Voiced by: Kazuhiro Nakata
Yasm is the Spirit of Darkness; he devised a plan to destroy the balance of the world by capturing the seirei and sealing their powers. He is first defeated by Pinon with the power of the moon from Papuu. He immediately returned to the human world as a sand dragon, but was again destroyed by Luna's Golden key. There is a mystery behind Yasm, because all the elementals had no human names to begin with, so there is a chance that another was controlling Yasm's plan.
Zephys
Voiced by: Jun Karazawa
She was the first king of all sprites when the time only sprites exist. As time flows, the race of humans and dragons appeared and they took place where sprites used to live. Such angered Zephys and she threw a war on the other races to drive them out, and such hatred turned her into the sprite of darkness. Seeing her action, the god used the power of Creation of the wills of light, Duon, to split her into the Ocean half and the Forest half, and sealed them near the Emphemeral (Utakata) Temple on the Petrification Island and near the Aventurine (Isago) Temple in Popolocrois respectively, with only the soul of Zephys able to escape. This created the Law of the Moon (this is the reason why Narucia will turn into air when she touches sea water and Luna will turn into sand when she goes to the land without the golden key). Initially, Zephys created Yasm to weaken the moon so that she can revive. However, such plan fails after Pinon, Luna and Marco destroyed Yasm. She used Seilene, the queen of Ocean sprites and the mother of Luna to break the Moon Drop thus deactivating the Law of the Moon, as well as the seal of the two halves of her body, then she left Seilene to her Ocean half. She was very tough to deal with even just in the half form, let alone the full form. She even turned all water sprites into dark sprites as her army. When Seilene sacrificed herself to reactivate the Law of the Moon, Zephys was split into two once again. However, some of her body part stayed and wanted to kill Luna for revenge, only to be destroyed by Pinon with the Wind Cutter.
Gaude
Voiced by: Taiten Kusunoki, Seiko Tamura (young)
Gaude is an Ocean Sprite who is the henchmen of Zephys. In the past, his mother rescued a human boy from being drowned in the seashore, which caused her death (turned into sand because of violation of the Law of the Moon for walking onto the land). Such incident has planted his hatred towards the Law of the Moon and determined to abolish it in any costs, even if it means to work with the Queen of the Dark Sprites. Gaude normally uses a giant crab mecha to fight others and transportation, and it is also used to destroy the Darkart to render the group of Pinon immobile. During the final fight on the seas between the Petrification Island and the Demon Channel, after the Ocean half is unsealed, Marco cried for her Mum since he thought he may lose her forever. At this point, Gaude also cried because he is also doing what he has done to save his own mother. A sudden twist in his mind caused him to rescue Pinon and the gang from falling into the Demon Channel, which he fall into it instead. He laughed at himself ironically and met his end after he called her mother for the last time.
Elena Pakapuka
Voiced by: Yuko Minaguchi
Introduced in the second arc. She is King Pietoro's little sister, and Pinon's aunt. This is the same Elena from the game series, the 3-year-old child that admired Pietoro and Narcia. Now she is 18 years old and now is the boss of her own ship, The Dakart, and she travels around the world for fun. She is an excellent swordsman (skilled enough to do the same technique that Pietro uses, "Wind Cutter"/"Kaze no Yaiba") and very commanding, but kind and gentle toward the trio (Pinon, Luna, and Marco) and cares for them, she doesn't like Pinon calling her "obasan" (Aunt) because calling an 18-year-old girl an aunt isn't really flattering, so she prefers Pinon calling her "Oneesan" (Big Sister).

== Music ==
=== First series ===
The soundtrack of the first series was composed by Kow Otani, who has composed the soundtracks of many other well known anime series and video games.

- Opening theme: Natsu Kikyuu (夏気球; lit. 'Summer Balloon') by Rie Otsuka (大塚 利恵)
- Ending themes:

1. Kaze no Mahou (風の魔法; lit. 'Magic of the Wind') by Fumi Oto (大藤 史) (Eps: 1-24)
2. Kaze no Mahou (風の魔法; lit. 'Magic of the Wind') by Eri Miyajima (宮島 依里) (Ep: 25)

- Insert songs:

1. "シークレット・カーニバル"/"Secret Carnival" by Kitamura Takako (北村岳子) (Ep: 4)
2. "The 男のロマン"/"The Otoko no Roman" ("Man's Romance") by Furuta Arata (古田新太) (Eps: 7, 8, 11, 16)
3. "わたしぼっち"/"Watashi-bocchi" ("By Myself") by Miyajima Eri (宮島依里) (Ep: 8)
4. "君がいてくれる"/"Kimi ga Ite Kureru" ("You'll Be There for Me") by Orikasa Ai (折笠愛) (Ep: 11)
5. "空を見上げて"/"Sora wo Miagete" ("Look Up to the Sky") by Dounowaki Kyoko (堂ノ脇恭子) (Ep: 15)

=== Second series ===
- Opening themes:

1. "トロイメライ"/"Toroimerai" ("Träumerei") by Rurutia (ルルティア) (Eps: 1-13)
2. "ともだちの歌"/"Tomodachi no Uta" ("Song of Friends") by CORE OF SOUL (Eps: 14-26)

- Ending themes:

1. "月千一夜"/"Tsuki Sen'ichi-ya" ("1001 Nights in the Moon") by Rurutia (ルルティア) (Eps: 1-13)
2. "桜見丘"/"Sakuramioka" ("Hill for Watching Cherry Blossoms") by Local Bus (Eps: 14-26)
