= Captain Kuppa =

Japanese anime television series

砂漠の海賊！ キャプテンクッパ (Sabaku no Kaizoku! Kyaputen Kuppa)
- Genre: Action, Adventure, Science-fiction
- Anime television series
- Directed by: Kōichi Mashimo
- Produced by: Ken Suekawa
- Written by: Kōichi Mashimo
- Music by: Hayato Matsuo
- Studio: Bee Train Production
- Licensed by: NA: Enoki Films
- Original network: NHK BS2
- Original run: August 13, 2001 – February 11, 2002
- Episodes: 26

Captain Kuppa: Desert Pirate (砂漠の海賊！ キャプテンクッパ, Sabaku no Kaizoku! Kyaputen Kuppa; "The Desert Pirate! Captain Kuppa") is a 26-episode anime series that aired from 2001 to 2002.

Produced by Bee Train Production, it was licensed in English by Enoki Films. The anime aired on NHK BS2 on August 13, 2001. In 2002, Enoki Films announced on its website that it had licensed the series.

== Characters ==
- Kuppa (クッパ) - The main character, Kuppa is an 11-year-old boy.
- Yukke (ユッケ) - A 14-year-old girl, Yukke is Kuppa's sister
- Samgetan (サムゲタン Samugetan) - The object of Yukke's affections
- Bibmba (ビビンバ Bibinba) - He heads a crime organization called Pulcogi.
- Dram (ドラム Doramu) - Kuppa's assistant robot.
- Jet (ジェット Jetto) - Yukke's assistant robot.
