= .hack//Liminality =

OVA series

- Logotype of the .hack franchise: a hexagon with use of bitstream vera sans bolded font (basic Microsoft Windows font). Work based on logotypes from officials web sites.
- Original video animation
- Directed by: Koichi Mashimo (general director); Masayuki Yoshihara (#1); Koji Sawai (#2); Hiroshi Morioka (#3)
- Studio: Bee Train
- Released: June 20, 2002 – April 12, 2003
- Runtime: 45 minutes (#1); 27 minutes (#2); 30 minutes (#3–4); 132 minutes (total)
- Episodes: 4
- Related works
- .hack video games; .hack//Sign; .hack//GIFT; .hack//Legend of the Twilight

.hack//Liminality is an OVA series directly related to the .hack video game series for the PlayStation 2, with the perspective of Liminality focused on the real world as opposed to the games' MMORPG The World. Liminality was separated into four volumes; each volume was released with its corresponding game. The initial episode is 45 minutes long, while subsequent episodes are 30 minutes long. The video series was directed by Koichi Mashimo, written by Kazunori Itō with music by Yuki Kajiura. Primary Animation production was handled by Mashimo's studio Bee Train which collaborated for the four games as well as handled major production on .hack//Sign.

== Releases ==
The games were packaged with DVDs featuring episodes of .hack//Liminality, an original video animation (OVA) series that depicts events that occur concurrently with the games. The OVA series was meant to give perspective on fictional events happening in the "real world" outside the game.

- "Vol. 1: In the case of Mai Minase" (with .hack//Infection)
- "Vol. 2: In the case of Yuki Aihara" (with .hack//Mutation)
- "Vol. 3: In the case of Kyoko Tohno" (with .hack//Outbreak)
- "Vol. 4: Trismegistus" (with .hack//Quarantine)

== Plot ==
=== In the case of Mai Minase ===
Mai Minase and her boyfriend, Tomonari Kasumi, are taken to a hospital due to both of them collapsing while playing an MMORPG called The World at the G-study clubhouse. Despite Mai waking up shortly after arriving at the hospital, Tomonari remains in a coma. It is soon revealed that she heard a certain sound (which is also present at important points in .hack//Sign) shortly before collapsing. She meets Junichiro Tokuoka, a former employee of CC Corp, and they investigate Tomonari's coma. After examining Tomonari's The World account—Sieg—the investigation leads Mai and Tokuoka to break into G-study in order to attempt to recreate the same situation so that they can find out why Mai and Tomonari collapsed. The mysterious sound starts up again when they enter a field. When Tokuoka faints, Mai rushes them both outside. A splash of rainwater wakes Tokuoka. The two pledge to find out what CC Corp is hiding and what it will take to wake everyone up.

=== In the case of Yuki Aihara ===
Tokuoka and Mai are on their way to meet with Yuki Ahara in Yokohama. Tokuoka gets stuck in traffic, and Mai goes to the library in Tokyo to attempt to look up information, where she hears the mysterious sound. Meanwhile, Yuki is watching a movie when suddenly "THE WORLD" flashes on the screen, the power goes out, and employees attempt to evacuate the building. Yuki attempts to escape with an unnamed woman, but they both get stuck in an elevator shaft. At the same time, Mai comes across Harald Hoerwick (the creator of The World), and the Epitaph of Twilight. Later, she contacts Kyo, and finds out that fires have broken out all over Yokohama, and that there is no cell phone service. Yuki and the woman escape the building and discover that many cars have crashed outside. Finally, Tokuoka arrives in Yokohama to meet Yuki six hours late. Mai finally gets through to Tokuoka, and Kyo gets through to Yuki. It is discovered that Kyo knows quite a bit about the Epitaph of Twilight.

=== In the case of Kyoko Tohno ===
Tokuoka meets with Kyoko Tohno to discuss the mysteries in The World as well as the legends surrounding the Epitaph of Twilight. After receiving a phone call from a person working under the alias Bith the Black, Tokuoka and Kyoko realize that they have been watched by Helba's agentsfor an extended period based on emails sent to Mai and Yuki. The team begins to put together the puzzle behind Emma Wielant, the author of the Epitaph. After a chance run in with Kyoko's Father, they discover that he was contacted by Bith as well, working under another alias "Ichiro Sato."

Ichiro explains that Harald Hoerwick had used the game Fragment, the precursor to The World, to create a tribute to Emma's Epitaph of Twilight. He goes on to say that the incidents involving the coma victims were created as a result of Harald attempting to bring the real world into the online world, creating a hazy barrier between the two worlds, a concept called "Liminality." Ichiro says that CC Corp intends to shut down the servers of The World, thereby destroying any possible clues to awakening the coma victims. Tokuoka and Kyoko agree to meet with him on Christmas Eve at Urayasu to help him.

=== Trismegistus ===
Tokuoka, Kyoko, Yuki, and Mai learn from Ichiro that Harald Hoerwick's game Fragment had actually been a program to create an "Ultimate A.I." The system to create this A.I. became self autonomous, delaying the birth of the A.I. to keep itself from finishing its purpose and ceasing to exist. Ichiro enlists Tokuoka and his team to ensure the A.I.'s creation.

They sneak into a CC Corp data station at night. Ichiro hacks into the security system, allowing Tokuoka to begin collecting data. The security system is activated when Yuki buys a coffee from a vending machine, alerting security staff. Ichiro enlists the help of Yuki and Kyoko to buy Tokuoka and Mai some time. After the data is compiled, Tokuoka logs into The World using Tomonari Kasumi's account, Sieg. Suddenly, the server begins to malfunction and crash as CC Corp begins deleting their servers. Tokuoka realizes that if they complete this, everybody who is currently fighting will fall into a coma and the Ultimate A.I. will never be born. As he struggles to come up with a solution, Ichiro announces that they're out of time.

Later, it is revealed that the Ultimate A.I. was born and that there is enough evidence against CC Corp to bring them to court. The group celebrates their victory.

== Music ==
=== Theme songs ===
The music and lyrics of all opening themes and the one ending theme were composed by Yuki Kajiura, and were performed by See-Saw.

- Openings
1. Edge
2. A Thousand and One Nights (千夜一夜, Sen'yaichiya)
3. The Tale You Were In (君がいた物語, Kimi ga Ita Monogatari)
4. Memory (記憶, Kioku)
- Ending: Twilight Sea (黄昏の海, Tasogare no Umi)

=== CDs ===
.hack//Liminality Original Soundtrack Plus

Soundtrack album by Yuki Kajiura
- Released: September 21, 2002
- Genre: Anime soundtrack
- Languages: English, Japanese
- Label: Victor Entertainment

The .hack//Liminality Original Soundtrack Plus is a two disc set composed by Yuki Kajiura. The first disc is a 12 cm CD containing tracks of the OVA series and the second disc is an 8 cm CD titled .hack//Liminality Bonus Single and is the single for the opening themes: Thousand and One Nights and Edge. The third track, "Grandpa's Violin", is the violin piece that plays in the background when An Shouji and Mariko Misono meet for the first time at the end of episode 26 of .hack//Sign, Return. It was released on September 21, 2002, in Japan and in North America it was released with the third .hack//Sign Limited Edition DVD. A single by See-Saw titled Kimigaita monogatari/Emerald Green (君がいた物語/Emerald Green) was a single for the OVA series and was released on January 22, 2003.

Liminality Original Soundtrack
No.	Title	Length
1.	"Liminality #1"	1:07
2.	"Sweet Memories"	2:44
3.	"Grandpa's Violin"	2:27
4.	"Suspicion"	2:27
5.	"Comfort"	1:48
6.	"Tokuoka"	2:19
7.	"Liminality #2"	1:42
8.	"Mai"	3:29
9.	"Epitaph"	3:00
10.	"Humiliation"	2:13
11.	"School Days"	2:36
12.	"Liminality #3"	1:14
13.	"Talkin' About Mystery"	2:22
14.	"Don't Know But it Was Love"	1:51
15.	"Friendship"	1:01
16.	"Unforgettable"	2:22
17.	"Sweet Memories #2"	1:54
18.	"Together"	2:03
19.	"Illegal Entry"	1:11
20.	"Liminality #full version"	4:15

Bonus Single
No.	Title	Length
1.	"Thousand and One Nights" (Senya Ichiya (千夜一夜))	4:48
2.	"Thousand and One Nights (Karaoke)" (Senya Ichiya (Karaoke) (千夜一夜 (Karaoke)))	4:48
3.	"Edge (TV-Edit)"	1:30
4.	"The Sea of The Twilight (TV-Edit)" (Tasogare no Umi TV-Edit (黄昏の海 TV-Edit))	1:32
