= Minako Shiba =

Japanese animator and illustrator (1971–2021)

- 芝美奈子
- Born: February 15, 1971; Kanagawa Prefecture, Japan
- Died: March 2021
- Education: Chiyoda College of Technology
- Occupations: Animator, character designer
- Notable work: Black Butler; Kamigami no Asobi; Yowamushi Pedal; Hikaru no Go

Minako Shiba (Japanese: 芝美奈子, Hepburn: Shiba Minako; 2 February 1971 - March 2021) was a Japanese animator, character designer, and illustrator. She was known for her contributions to animated series such as Hikaru no Go, Black Butler, and Yowamushi Pedal, where she served as lead character designer or animation director.

== Life and career ==
Minako Shiba was born in Kanagawa Prefecture in 1971 and graduated from Chiyoda College of Technology. She was a fan of video games, and initially wanted to work in the video game industry, but decided to become an animator instead. After college, she initially worked with the studio J.C.Staff, and later worked with the studios C-ZOO and P.A. Works.

Shiba died in March 2021 at the age of 50.

== Filmography ==
- Noir (TV series)
- Black Butler
- Hikaru no Go
- Kamigami no Asobi
- Yowamushi Pedal
- Tsubasa: Reservoir Chronicle
- .hack//SIGN
- Madlax
- Rental Magica
- Red Data Girl
- Tegami Bachi
- Phantom ~Requiem for the Phantom~
- Hypnosis Mic -Division Rap Battle- Rhyme Anima
- Dr. Stone
- Blood+
