= Meine Liebe =

Video game series

吟遊黙示録 マイネリーベ (Gin'yū Mokushiroku Meine Liebe)
- Genre: Fantasy, Historical
- Video game

Tanbi Musō (Beautiful Dream) Meine Liebe
- Developer: Mobile21
- Publisher: Konami
- Genre: Dating sim
- Platform: Game Boy Advance
- Released: April 26, 2001
- Manga

Meine Liebe ~Eien naru Musō Kyoku~ (Eternal Dream Music)
- Written by: Rei Izawa
- Published by: Hakusensha
- English publisher: Chuang Yi (Singapore)
- Magazine: Bessatsu Hana to Yume
- Original run: November 2004 – May 2006
- Volumes: 4
- Anime television series
- Directed by: Koichi Mashimo
- Written by: Hiroyuki Kawasaki; Akemi Omode
- Music by: Yoshihisa Hirano
- Studio: Bee Train
- Original network: Animax
- Original run: November 4, 2004 – February 3, 2005
- Episodes: 13
- Video game

Meine Lieblingsfach
- Developer: Konami
- Genre: Dating sim
- Platform: PlayStation 2
- Released: September 22, 2004
- Novel

Gin'yū Mokushiroku Meine Liebe Unmei no Deai (Encounter of Fate)
- Written by: Shinobu Gotou
- Illustrated by: Rei Izawa
- Published by: Hakusensha
- Published: August 2005
- Anime television series

Meine Liebe ~Wieder~
- Directed by: Shinya Kawatsura
- Written by: Akemi Omode
- Music by: Yutaka Minobe
- Studio: Bee Train
- Original network: Animax
- Original run: January 22, 2006 – April 13, 2006
- Episodes: 13
- Video game

Meine Liebe II~Hokori to Seigi to Ai~ (Pride, Justice & Love)
- Developer: Konami
- Genre: Dating sim
- Platform: PlayStation 2
- Released: February 9, 2006

Gin'yū Mokushiroku Meine Liebe (吟遊黙示録 マイネリーベ; abbreviated to Meine Liebe, which is German for My Love) is a series of dating sims by Konami for the Game Boy Advance and PlayStation 2.

Meine Liebe has been adapted into an anime series produced in 2004 by the studio Bee Train, which was broadcast across Japan by the anime television network, Animax. In 2006 a sequel was produced by the name of Gin'yū Mokushiroku Meine Liebe wieder (吟遊黙示録マイネリーベ ヴィーダー, My Love Again), which was also broadcast across Japan by Animax.

The story follows the lives of students at an elite academy of the fictional European country of Kuchen in 1937.

Other adaptations consist of a four volume Meine Liebe manga and a novel; as well, several drama CDs have been released.

== Settings ==
The entire story takes place in a country called Kuchen, a fictional country located in the Atlantic Ocean, to the coasts of France and south of Britain. The word "kuchen" is the German word for "cake", and most of the places and people are also German-based. Other notable cities are Kirsche ("cherry"), Erdbeere ("strawberry") and Mürbe ("shortcrust").

Kuchen is a monarchy. The king of Kuchen decided that his country would not get involved in the disheveled politics of a world between two world wars. The king is aided by several scholars with strong backgrounds and logical minds, who earned recognition from the Kuchen church. They are men with a noble rank who graduated from the prestigious Rosenstolz academy.

Rosenstolz (German for "pride of the rose") academy is a boarding school which students from wealthy families attend. The academy is open to all genders, though only the boys have a dorm on the academy's ground. Rosenstolz is located in a peaceful town, though its grounds stretch over parts of the surrounding wilderness and forest. The gardens are well tended, consisting of a flourishing greenhouse, stables and narrow channels and fountains.

It is known that the students in Rosenstolz are expected to learn fencing, horseback riding, world history and Kuchen history, science and languages. The academy has one special class that's called the Strahl candidate's class (Strahl being German for ray), where all the prominent young men study hard in the hopes of becoming the king's councilors. Until headmaster Werner's reform, only those who were born to the right social class could study there.

The academy is said to welcome everyone. Amongst the academy's alumni are the current headmaster Bartholomew, councilor Gerald, Victor Gryffith, Josef Torger and the king. It is known that Beruze and headmaster Werner did not go to Rosenstolz.

== Story ==
The main hero of the anime is Orpherus, a young man who believes in a country ruled by its people and whose older sister was killed in an act of terrorism two years prior. Orpherus (nicknamed Orphe) is surrounded by his friends and rivals and together they struggle to make their dream come true – being the king's advisers.

=== First season ===
The first season begins by introducing the characters, their past and their ambitions. Orpherus, Eduard, Camus, Ludwig and Naoji are five noblemen who attend the prestigious Rosenstolz academy and a part of the Strahl class – a class for potential candidates for the advisory positions in the royal palace in the small European country of Kuchen. Isaac is an English writer who visits Kuchen. While still students, the five noblemen are forced to deal with corrupted politicians, secret agents, attempted murder and ambitious individuals from both inside and outside of school who threaten to break the fragile peace in their country, and even assassinate the king.

=== Second season ===
The five Strahl candidates return to their final year in Rosenstolz, but troubles are far from over. The previous headmaster disappears without saying a word and the new headmaster has a revolutionary idea that threatens to tear the academy apart. But there are troubles not only inside the academy. The king is hiding information, Lui's mother is depressed and Lui himself is being accused of severe treason. While on the run Orphe is nearly shot once again, and Ed finds out that figures from their past have once again arrived at Kuchen. Now the five of them must prove Lui's innocence while stopping a hideous ploy to sell Kuchen to foreign hands.

== Main characters ==
Orpherus Fürst von Marmelade nahe Görz (オルフェレウス)

Voiced by: Takahiro Sakurai

Orpherus is nicknamed Orphe by most of the people around him. His title Fürst, means he is a prince, but neither the anime nor the manga show that he is really royalty and therefore suggest he is the ruler of a "principality" royal and noble ranks as in German custom. Orphe is not the son of a king called a "Prinz" (prince) in German he is called "Fürst"(prince) indicating his place as the first of his house, as his parents do not appear and he is the presumed head and "first" of his house. The household employs a butler and Orphe had an older sister named Robertine, who died when he was 15. Orphe was devastated after her death, and has the habit of caressing the pendant that Robertine's fiancé gave her and which Orphe took from the rubble of the explosion site. He blames himself for not accompanying her to buy the wedding dress, despite the fact that she insisted on going alone.
Orphe is a very idealistic person. Isaac reprimands him on this, saying that he is unconnected to today's society and that words alone would not stifle the sparks of war. According to his way of thinking it can be said that he is also an idealist. He likes politics and holds women in higher regards than most of the men in his time. He's prone to winning and strives to excel in everything he does. He decided to become a Strahl candidate after meeting the king as a boy.
Eduard Markgraf von Sekt nahe Braunschweig (エドヴァルド)

Voiced by: Tomokazu Seki, Drama voice by: Shotaro Morikubo

Eduard is nicknamed "Ed" by most of the people around him. His title, Markgraf means Marquis. His father had an illegal affair with a woman of a lower rank, resulting in Ed and Erika (Ed's little sister). After his mother died, his father took him into his house. However, he was already married with three girls, all of whom were older than Ed. Henriette Braunschweig, Ed's stepmother, hated Ed because she wasn't able to give birth to a male heir to the Braunschweig family assets, going as far as telling her daughters not to speak with their two half siblings. Eventually Ed's father had Erika removed from the house to appease his wife, and her whereabouts are unknown. Ed is still burdened by this because he had promised his sister that he would protect her, and was unable to fulfill that promise.
Ed's appearance is unlike that of the other nobles in the series. He goes with his neck uncovered, he is more tanned than the others and has an earring. Ed is very cheerful and likes to take things easy. He is also the comic relief throughout the series, with his attempts at meditation and kendo. He makes friends easily and wears his heart on his sleeve, though he does not care what other people think about him. He is a good swordsman but is not above using his fists in a fight, another thing that distinguishes him from the other nobles.
Ludwig Herzog von Mohn nahe Liechtenstein (ルードヴィッヒ)

Voiced by: Toshihiko Seki, Drama voice by: Akira Ishida

Ludwig is often nicknamed as Lui by the people around him, though most still refer to him as Ludwig because they are afraid of him or revere him. His title Herzog is the second highest title among the nobles, and means Duke. His father is a Duke as well, but his mother is the king's sister, making the king of Kuchen his uncle. His other uncle on his mother's side is the king's (rebellious) younger brother, Helbert. His uncle on his father's side is Camus' father, making the two of them cousins. It is known that he has two housekeepers named Augusta and Clemence, a younger sister and a younger brother. Also, he is left-handed.
Lui appears cold-hearted most of the time. He is very arrogant and yet he knows what is expected of him by his rank and position in the world of those times, and accepts it with cold indifference. He often leaves his friend shocked at his words when he voices his thoughts. However, Lui is a good judge of character and seems to know what to say to help the people he is fond of in order to solve problems on their own. He likes challenges, as long as they are fair towards both ends. Lui claims that he is not like the others, insinuating that he is cold hearted and calculated, and compares himself to Orphe by saying that he can not grasp an opportunity and fight for it like Orphe does. Isaac reprimands Lui for his way of thinking, claiming that it was too dangerous.
Camus Pfalzgraf von Silvaner Lüneburg (カミユ)

Voiced by: Soichiro Hoshi, Drama voice by: Kōki Miyata

Camus does not have a nickname like the others, but due to Japanese pronunciation it is often thought that he is nicknamed "Camu", however that is not so. Camus' rank of Pfalzgraf is the lowest of the nobles and means Count palatine. Camus has an elder sister and an elder brother named Leohart, who is especially protective of him and has watched over him ever since the day he was born.
Camus possesses a special ability, something akin to empathy. He is able to talk to flowers and under his care they bloom more wildly than any place else (his mansion consists of huge gardens that he tend to himself). This ability also enables him to tell a person's mood. He can tell when someone is upset or angry, like he knew that Isaac was angry at the Strahl class when he visited the academy even though Isaac was smiling. He also receives visions of future events, but when he warns the people involved he is usually feared instead of heeded. Due to this ability he is often feared, misunderstood or mocked.
Naoji Ishizuki (石月ナオジ)

Voiced by: Akira Ishida, Drama voice by: Tomokazu Sugita

Naoji is the only one who does not have a rank, and is in fact not a noble. Naoji was born in Japan to a prestigious family. His father sent him to Kuchen to turn him into an educated and experienced man, but also to protect him from the impending war in Japan (World War II). Without his knowledge, a Kuchen citizenship application was submitted in his name by his father, something he is very upset over. He is staying with a man named Foster, who was like a father to Naoji's mother.
Naoji has a younger sister, a grandfather and a non-Japanese grandmother. His grandmother was born in Kuchen to a Dukedom and was described to be a true lady with perfect education. She met Naoji's grandfather when he was studying abroad and all but eloped with him to Japan. Throughout the anime series, Naoji is the only one who speaks the common Japanese dialect, while the rest of the characters speak in an extremely polite and somewhat archaic dialect to distinguish between them.
Isaac Cavendish (アイザック)

Voiced by: Takehito Koyasu

Isaac is a British spy who works undercover in Kuchen. Since Kuchen insisted on remaining neutral despite the time and era being just between two world wars, the British government wanted to know if Kuchen can be influenced (by force if necessary) to support their side. So Isaac is sent, and for nearly a year he works in Kuchen in the disguise of an author, though he is not the only secret agent who works undercover in Kuchen.
Isaac actually received the title "Sir" for his service to his country. His parents were fallen noblemen that, due to poverty, were thrown out of their manor, something that affected his sister very much. He has three younger siblings: a sister named Rosa and two younger brothers. At some point after they were thrown out of their manor Isaac was left to take care of his younger siblings and was separated from his parents. He joined the army to earn money and support the family during World War I (he calls that time "hell"), and due to his outstanding conduct in battle was recruited to the secret services.
Isaac has a motorcycle and usually carries a revolver. Also, he seems to have strange connections with some of the alumni of Rosenstolz academy.

== Media ==
=== Anime ===
The anime from Bee Train studio was directed by Koichi Mashimo and had Minako Shiba as the character designer. The first season of the anime was aired on the Animax network in November 2004 and the second season in January 2006. Though adapted from a dating sims game, the anime pushed aside the main character of Erika, and she makes only brief appearances during the series. The thirteen Meine Liebe episodes were released on DVD by Geneon Entertainment from February 4, 2005, to August 10, 2005, with Marvelous Entertainment Inc. releasing the last two episodes Geneon Entertainment released the thirteen Meine Liebe – wieder episodes on DVD from February 24, 2006, to August 25, 2006. The anime is also licensed in German by Tokyopop Germany. The first series is currently streaming on Viewster.

=== Manga ===
Written and illustrated by Rei Isawa with character designs by Kaori Yuki, a manga adaption titled Meine Liebe (マイネリーベ 〜永遠なる夢想曲(トロイメライ), Meine Liebe: Eien naru Traumerei) was serialized in Bessatsu Hana to Yume. Hakusensha collected the chapters into four tankōbon and published them from January 19, 2005, to May 19, 2006. The series focuses on a good-natured girl named Erika Kraus, who attends the Rosenstolz Academy to find her brother.

Meine Liebe is licensed in Singapore for an English-language release by Chuang Yi, and in Germany by Tokyopop Germany.

=== Volume list ===
No.	Release date	ISBN
01	January 19, 2005	978-4-592-18897-1
02	August 19, 2005	978-4-592-18889-6
03	February 17, 2006	978-4-592-18893-3
04	May 19, 2006	978-4-592-18896-4

=== Novel ===
"Encounter of Fate" (吟遊黙示録マイネリーベ 運命の出会い, Gin'yuu Mokushiroku Meine Liebe Unmei no Deai)

A novel named Encounter of Fate was serialized on Betsuhana magazine in August 2005, 2006. This novel was authored by Shinobu Gotou, with illustrations by Rei Izawa and the cooperation of Kaori Yuki. The novel has 230 pages.

=== Drama CDs ===
Geneon Entertainment released four Meine Liebe drama CDs. The first was published on March 10, 2005 The second followed on April 1, 2005.

Geneon Entertainment released the first Meine Liebe Wieder drama CD on April 21, 2006. The second was released on June 23, 2006.

- Drama CD 3, ploy, was released on 13/5/2005
- A special drama CD, special vacation for the Strahl candidates, was released on 10/8/2005

Of note is that although the voice actors for Orpherus and Isaac remained unchanged, Akira Ishida voiced Ludwig instead of reprising his role as Naoji in the anime version.

== Related items ==
Several character CD's were published after the second season, each performed by the voice actor of that character:

- Orpherus character CD (21/7/2006)
- Eduard character CD (21/7/2006)
- Camus character CD (21/7/2006)
- Ludwig character CD (25/10/2006)
- Naoji character CD (25/10/2006)
- Isaac character CD (25/10/2006)
