= Kazuhiro Nakata =

Japanese voice actor

- 中多 和宏
- Born: Nagasaki Prefecture, Japan
- Occupation: Voice actor

Kazuhiro Nakata (中多 和宏, Nakata Kazuhiro; born Kazuhiro Nakata (中田 和宏, Nakata Kazuhiro)) is a Japanese voice actor affiliated with Ken Production. He played Bear in .hack//Sign and Fei-Wang Reed in Tsubasa: Reservoir Chronicle.

== Biography ==
He became interested with voice acting, while studying university, when at one point he was assigned to be a chairman of a radio drama production at the festival.

== Filmography ==
=== Television animation ===
- Mobile Suit Victory Gundam (1993) – Duker Iq
- Mobile Fighter G Gundam (1994) – Gentle Chapman
- Mobile Suit Gundam Wing (1995) – Rashid Kurama
- Virtua Fighter (1995) as Lee Coleman
- After War Gundam X (1996) – Nomoa Long
- Cowboy Bebop (1998) – Morgan
- Gear Fighter Dendoh (2002) – Altair the Black Knight
- Kasumin (2001) – Kirinobito
- .hack//Sign (2002) – Bear
- Witchblade (2006) – Masaya Wado
- Fate/stay night (2006) – Sōichirō Kuzuki
- Demonbane (2006) – Ness
- Baccano! (2007) – Senator Manfred Beriam
- Idolmaster: Xenoglossia (2007) – Joseph Shingetsu

==== Unknown date ====
- .hack//Roots (????) – Taihaku
- Argento Soma (????) – Colonel Kilgore
- Atashin'chi (????) – Karasawa-sensei (First)
- Bleach (????) – Jiroubou Ikkanzaka, Kagine-sensei
- B'TX (????) – Karas
- Corrector Yui (????) – Virus
- Crayon Shin-chan (????) – Billy Tachibana, Ohta
- Detective Conan (????) – Cedar Forest Governmental Person) Tomidokoro (episode 86)
- Elemental Gelade (????) – Beazon
- Full Metal Panic! (????) – Bryant
- Grappler Baki (????) – Kosho Shinogi
- Great Teacher Onizuka (????) – Hajime Fukuroda
- Grenadier ~The Smiling Senshi~ (????) – The Jester/Kaizan Doshi
- Heat Guy J (????) – Misha
- Initial D Fourth Stage (????) – Tomoyuki Tachi
- Irresponsible Captain Tylor (????) – Cryburn
- Kiteretsu Daihyakka (????) – Saigō Takamori
- Konjiki no Gash Bell!! (????) – Toyama-sensei
- Kotencotenco (????) – The Baron
- Mahōjin Guru Guru (????) – Captain
- Naruto (????) – Shiin
- Nintama Rantarou (????) – Tamasaburō, Kuen Castella
- Outlaw Star (????) – Ron MacDougall
- Rurouni Kenshin (????) – Shikijō
- Saiunkoku Monogatari (????) – Kijin Kou
- Shaman King (????) – Karim
- Shin Hakkenden (????) – Kajiya Yagami
- Shōnen Onmyōji (????) – Byakko
- Slayers Next (????) – Halcyform
- Legend of Heavenly Sphere Shurato (????) – Kūya, the King Dappa
- Tsubasa Chronicle (????) – Fei Wong Reed
- Yu-Gi-Oh! Duel Monsters GX (????) – Ikkaku Tachibana
- Brave Command Dagwon (????) – Demos
- The Secret of Twilight Gemini (????) – Priest
- Rockman EXE series (Doctor Regal, Laserman, Kyuuma Hoshida)
- Sakigake!! Otokojuku (????) – Kiyomi Tsubakiyama

=== OVA ===
- Armor Hunter Mellowlink (????) – Sukarupesu
- Gundam Wing: Endless Waltz (1997) – Rashid Kurama
- Giant Robo (????) – Blood Furen
- Urotsukidōji (????) – D-9
- M.D. Geist (????) – Geist) (Director's Cut version)
- M.D. Geist II: Death Force (????) – Geist
- Mazinkaiser: Shitou! Ankoku Daishogun (????) – Dante
- Phantom - The Animation (????) – Scythe Master
- The Silent Service (1995) – Harold D. Baker

=== Theatrical animation ===
- Mobile Suit Gundam Wing: Endless Waltz Special Edition (1998) – Rashid Kurama
- Gundress (1999) – Seremu
- Rockman EXE: The Program of Light and Darkness (2005) – Doctor Regal, Nebula Grey
- Fate/stay night Unlimited Blade Works (2010) – Sōichirō Kuzuki

=== Video games ===
- Crash Bandicoot 2: Cortex Strikes Back (1997) – Doctor N. Gin
- Crash Bandicoot: Warped (1998) – Doctor N. Gin
- Ehrgeiz (1998) – Vincent Valentine
- Crash Team Racing (1999) – Doctor N. Gin
- Valkyrie Profile (1999) – Belinas, Wraith
- Crash Bandicoot: The Wrath of Cortex (2001) – Doctor N. Gin
- Crash Nitro Kart (2003) – Doctor N. Gin
- Samurai Shodown V Special (2004) – Zankuro Minazuki
- Super Robot Wars MX (2004) – Altair
- Suikoden IV (2004) – Clay
- Crash Twinsanity (2004) – Doctor N. Gin
- Elemental Gelade: Matoe, Suifū no Tsurugi (2005) – Beazon
- Shadow of the Colossus (2005) – Dormin (male voice)
- Xenosaga Episode III: Also sprach Zarathustra (2006) – Suou Uzuki

=== Drama CDs ===
- Kao no Nai Otoko (xxxx) (Hisashi Kiriyuu)
- Manatsu no Higaisha 1 & 2 (xxxx) (Yuuichi Ookura)
- Pinky Wolf (xxxx) (Masakazu Kuroki)
- Stanley Hawk no Jikenbo ~AMBIVALENCE . Katto~ (xxxx) (Stanley)

=== Dubbing roles ===
==== Live-action ====
- Hugo Weaving
  - The Matrix – Agent Smith
  - The Matrix Reloaded – Agent Smith
  - The Matrix Revolutions – Agent Smith
- The 13th Warrior – Edgtho (Daniel Southern)
- 2 Fast 2 Furious (2006 TV Asahi edition) – Carter Verone (Cole Hauser)
- Alarm für Cobra 11 – Die Autobahnpolizei – André Fux (Mark Keller)
- Alive – Carlitos Páez (Bruce Ramsay)
- Armageddon (2002 Fuji TV edition) – Tucker (Anthony Guidera)
- Babylon 5 – Jeffrey Sinclair (Michael O'Hare)
- Big Trouble – Eddie Leadbetter (Johnny Knoxville)
- Casino Royale – Le Chiffre (Mads Mikkelsen)
- D-Tox – Noah (Robert Patrick)
- Deep Rising – Mamooli (Cliff Curtis)
- Deep Rising (2000 TV Asahi edition) – T-Ray Jones (Trevor Goddard)
- Demon Knight – Roach (Thomas Haden Church)
- Deuce Bigalow: Male Gigolo – Detective Charles Fowler (William Forsythe)
- Die Hard with a Vengeance – Rolf (Robert Sedgwick)
- Die Hard with a Vengeance (TV edition) – Gunther (Timothy Adams)
- End of Days – Monk (Mo Gallini)
- Falling Down (1997 TV Asahi edition) – Detective Lydecker (D. W. Moffett)
- The Fast and the Furious – Johnny Tran (Rick Yune)
- The Firm – Ray McDeere (David Strathairn)
- High Incident – Sergeant Jim Marsh (David Keith)
- The Messenger: The Story of Joan of Arc – Gilles de Rais (Vincent Cassel)
- Mission: Impossible (1999 Fuji TV/2003 TV Asahi editions) – Max's Companion (Andreas Wisniewski)
- Natural Born Killers – Mickey Knox (Woody Harrelson)
- Platoon (2003 TV Tokyo edition) – Doc (Paul Sanchez)
- RoboCop – Dick Jones (Ronny Cox)
- The Rock (2000 TV Asahi edition) – Seal Reigert (Marshall Teague)
- Shaolin Soccer – Whirlwind Leg (Mok Mei Lam)
- She-Wolf of London – Pitak (Pete Lee-Wilson)
- Space Jam – Larry Bird
- Tokyo Raiders – Detective Lam Kwai-yan (Tony Leung Chiu-wai)
- Tomorrow Never Dies (2002 TV Asahi edition) – Stamper (Götz Otto)
- True Romance – Drexl Spivey (Gary Oldman)
- Twin Peaks – Tommy "Hawk" Hill (Michael Horse)
- Ultraman: Towards the Future - Ryugulo
- The Untouchables – Frank Nitti (Billy Drago)

==== Animation ====
- The Batman – James Gordon (first voice)
- Hello Kitty's Furry Tale Theater – Grinder
- Codename: Kids Next Door – Mr. Fizz
- Justice League – Mongul
- Looney Tunes – Marvin the Martian

=== Other ===
- Peter Pan's Flight (Giant Octopus)
