= List of .hack media =

This is a list of media related to the .hack multimedia franchise. The series encompasses anime, manga, novels, and video games. There are also two collectible card games based on the series.

== Games ==
=== Video games ===
Title	Original release date		
Title	Japan	North America	PAL region
.hack//Infection	June 20, 2002	February 11, 2003	March 26, 2004
Notes: Released on the PlayStation 2; Part of the .hack series
.hack//Mutation	September 9, 2002	May 7, 2003	June 18, 2004
Notes: Released on the PlayStation 2; Part of the .hack series
.hack//Outbreak	December 12, 2002	September 9, 2003	September 10, 2004
Notes: Released on the PlayStation 2; Part of the .hack series
.hack//Quarantine	April 10, 2003	January 13, 2004	December 10, 2004
Notes: Released on the PlayStation 2; Part of the .hack series
.hack//frägment	November 23, 2005		
Notes: Released on the PlayStation 2; Online play available with PlayStation 2 network adaptor
.hack//Chat			
Notes:.hack//Chat (.hack//チャット) is a chat client that uses the MetagateX plug-in to move 64-bit avatars and chat in real time.
.hack//MOBILE			
Notes:.hack//MOBILE is a cellphone game only released in Japan.
.hack//G.U. Vol. 1 Rebirth	May 18, 2006	October 24, 2006	
Notes: Released on the PlayStation 2; Part of the .hack//G.U. series
.hack//G.U. Vol. 2 Reminisce	September 28, 2006	May 8, 2007	
Notes: Released on the PlayStation 2; Part of the .hack//G.U. series
.hack//G.U. Vol. 3 Redemption	January 18, 2007	September 8, 2007	
Notes: Released on the PlayStation 2; Part of the .hack//G.U. series
.hack//Link	March 4, 2010		
Notes: Released on the PlayStation Portable
.hack//Versus	June 28, 2012		
Notes: Fighting game released on the PlayStation 3, bundled with .hack//The Movie.
.hack//G.U. Vol. 4 Reconnection	November 1, 2017	November 3, 2017	November 3, 2017
Notes: Released on the PlayStation 4; Part of the .hack//G.U. series, bundled in .hack//G.U. Last Recode

=== Collectible card game ===
Title	Original release date		
Title	Japan	North America	PAL region
.hack//ENEMY	2003	2003	
Notes: Card game based on Project .hack
.hack//G.U. The Card Battle			
Notes: Card game based on .hack Conglomerate

== Anime and film ==
Title	Original release date		
Title	Japan	North America	PAL region
.hack//Sign	April 4, 2002	February 1, 2003	May 10, 2004 (DVD)
Notes: TV series following Tsukasa, a player trapped within the game
.hack//Liminality	June 20, 2002	February 11, 2003	March 26, 2004
Notes: OVA series detailing events occurring in the real world concurrently to the .hack games; Each episode was released as a bonus DVD with its corresponding game (in Japan, only the special edition game with the extra DVD)
.hack//Gift	April 10, 2003	January 13, 2004	December 10, 2004
Notes: One episode OVA parodying the .hack series; In Japan, players who bought all four games were mailed this DVD.; In the North American and European releases, it was included on the fourth Liminality disc. This can be accessible by highlighting data and then ".hack//Gift". After highlighting it, the six scenes appear on the screen.
.hack//Legend of the Twilight	January 8, 2003	May 25, 2004 (DVD)	July 24, 2006 (DVD)
Notes: Sequel to the .hack games, following Shugo and Rena
.hack//Roots	April 5, 2006	November 11, 2006	July 16, 2007 (DVD)
Notes: TV series following Haseo, a new player to the game, and his adventures with the Twilight Brigade; The last five episodes were never broadcast in North America
Online Jack	November 23, 2005	October 24, 2006	
Notes: Animated shorts included in the .hack//G.U. games that follow Salvador Aihara, a reporter investigating "Doll Syndrome"
.hack//G.U. Trilogy			
Notes: Feature-length, computer-generated film which adapts the events of .hack//G.U. with some modifications
.hack//G.U. Returner			
Notes: A short follow up video and the conclusion to .hack//Roots released under the .hack Conglomerate project. It tells the story about the characters of .hack//G.U. in one last adventure.
.hack//Quantum			
Notes: A three part OVA series from Kinema Citrus and the first in the anime series of .hack to be licensed by Funimation.
.hack//The Movie			
Notes: A CGI movie, announced in August 23, 2011. On January 21, 2012, it was launched in theaters throughout Japan.

== Manga ==
Title	Original release date		
Title	Japan	North America	PAL region
.hack//Legend of the Twilight	July 30, 2002	September 9, 2003	February 19, 2004
Notes: Sequel to the .hack games, following Shugo and Rena
.hack//Rena Special Pack			
Notes: Special edition of .hack//Legend of the Twilight with Rena figurine, Grunty keychain, bonus info, and .hack//Rumor, a short story also featured in .hack//AI buster 2
.hack//G.U.+	June 23, 2006	February 12, 2008	
Notes: Five-volume manga adaptation of .hack//G.U. with changes; (JP) ISBN 4-04-713829-0, (US) ISBN 1-4278-1381-7 (Vol. 1); (JP) ISBN 4-04-713863-0, (US) ISBN 978-1-4278-0636-9 (Vol. 2); (JP) ISBN 4-04-713906-8, (US) ISBN 1-4278-0768-X (Vol. 3); (JP) ISBN 4-04-715009-6, (US) ISBN 1-4278-1502-X (Vol. 4); (JP) ISBN 4-04-715210-2, (US) ISBN 1-4278-1710-3 (Vol. 5)
.hack//XXXX	September 7, 2006	June 2008	
Notes: Manga adaptation of the .hack games with changes
.hack//GnU			
Notes: Short, comical sidestory featuring Raid, a new player
.hack//4koma	March 26, 2007	March 30, 2010	
Notes: Collection of yonkoma comics originally published in .hack//G.U. The World, a magazine published by Bandai; Also features sidestories "Peaco's Story", "Gaspard's Go, Go The World!", and "Gabiman"
.hack//Alcor	March 26, 2007	December 1, 2009	
Notes: Short sidestory about Nanase and her rival, Alkaid, also called "Battle Overture"; (JP) ISBN 4-04-713908-4, (US) ISBN 1-4278-1596-8
.hack//LINK: Twilight Knights	March 26, 2009	June 29, 2010	
Notes: Sequel to .hack//G.U., following Tokio, a boy who is physically drawn into The World R:X

== Novels ==
Title	Original release date		
Title	Japan	North America	PAL region
.hack//AI buster		January 1, 2006	
Notes: Novel about Albireo, a debugger who meets a vagrant AI
.hack//AI buster 2		February 7, 2006	
Notes: Collection of short stories: ".hack//2nd Character/Haruka Mizuhara's Situation", ".hack//Wotan's Spear", ".hack//Kamui", ".hack//Rumor", and ".hack//Firefly"
.hack//Zero	May 2003		
Notes: Novel about Carl, a female player who encounters an AI version of Sora
.hack//Another Birth		June 13, 2006	
Notes: Novelization of the .hack games, from BlackRose's perspective
.hack//Epitaph of Twilight	April 26, 2008		
Notes: Novelization of the Epitaph of Twilight, a central document in the series
.hack//CELL	November 2005	March 2, 2010	
Notes: Novel about Midori, a "professional victim"
.hack//G.U.	April 1st, 2007	February 10, 2009	
Notes: Four-volume novelization of .hack//G.U. with changes; The Terror of Death (JP) ISBN 978-4-04-422207-9, (US) ISBN 1-4278-1381-7; Borderline MMO (JP) ISBN 978-4-04-422208-6, (US) ISBN 978-1-4278-1382-4; Harald's Archetype (JP) ISBN 978-4-04-422209-3; 8-Dimensional Thoughts (JP) ISBN 978-4-04-422210-9

== Other ==
Title	Original release date		
Title	Japan	North America	PAL region
Let's Meet Offline			
Notes: CD drama based on Legend of the Twilight depicting the main characters meeting offline
.hack//the visions			
Notes: Compilation artbook contains .hack//Sign, .hack//Legend of the Twilight, and the .hack games illustrations which were originally shown in different issues of Newtype during 2002
.hack//analysis			
Notes: Companion book for Project .hack
.hack//The World			
Notes: Magazine with news about .hack
Encyclopedia .hack			
Notes: Companion book for Project .hack
.hack//G.U. The World			
Notes: Magazine with news about .hack//G.U.
.hackey			
Notes: Monthly free promotional newsletter about .hack
.hack//G.U. Perfect Guide Book			
Notes: Companion book for .hack Conglomerate
First Login			
Notes: CD drama based on Roots depicting Haseo's first time in The World
End of The World			
Notes: The End of The World is the Terminal Disc that comes with .hack//G.U. Vol.1 Rebirth.
