= Avenger (TV series) =

Japanese anime television series

- Genre: Science fiction
- Anime television series
- Directed by: Koichi Mashimo
- Produced by: Shinichi Ikeda; Kōji Morimoto; Tetsurō Satomi
- Written by: Hidefumi Kimura
- Music by: Ali Project
- Studio: Bee Train
- Licensed by: NA: Bandai Entertainment
- Original network: TV Tokyo
- Original run: 1 October 2003 – 24 December 2003
- Episodes: 13

Avenger (stylized as AVENGER) is an anime series, produced by Bandai Visual and Bee Train, and directed by Koichi Mashimo. It is set on post-apocalyptic colonized Mars. The 13-episode series premiered across Japan between 1 October 2003 and 24 December 2003 on the TV Tokyo network. It was later licensed for North American distribution by Bandai's distributive unit across the region, Bandai Entertainment.

== Plot ==
The story is set on a colonized Mars at some unspecified point in the future. Following the destruction of Earth, the majority of the human population is divided up into a number of small domed city-states. Those who live outside the domes in the harsh wildernesses of the planet are known as Barbaroi. Resources are scarce, and supplies are divided out between cities based on the outcome of gladiatorial battles between representative fighters from each city. Adding to the problems of the colonists, no children have been born on Mars for a decade. The cause of the infertility is unknown, but people have turned to child-size robots called dolls as a substitute for the presence of children in their lives. And a red moon, Earth's moon, hangs over Mars, drawn towards the red planet after the destruction of Earth and ravaging it with lunar storms caused by gravitational fluctuations between Mars and its unwelcome satellite.

The protagonist of the story is Layla Ashley, a barbaroi gladiator from Serena City with a mysterious and tragic past and follows her quest to defeat Volk, the ruler of Mars. She is accompanied on her journey by Nei, a strange "doll" whom she shares a deep emotional connection with, and Speedy, a doll breeder (or repairman) from the same city she's from.

== Characters ==
Layla Ashley (レイラ・アシュレイ)
Voiced by: Megumi Toyoguchi (Japanese); Deborah Sale Butler (English)
A silent, brooding young woman. As a young child, Layla became the only survivor of a colony ship which was shot down and destroyed by Volk over Mars-(under his orders) to prevent its human cargo from further taxing the planet's already stretched resources, with the ship's destruction having caused her parents deaths; she then sustained a huge scar on her back after the escape pod she was place into crash landed on Mars. She was taken in and trained to fight by Cross-(her former mentor and legal guardian) in order to learn the art of gladiator battles, and is now determined to avenge her parents and the other passengers of the colony ship by defeating Volk in a gladiator battle.
Volk (ヴォルク)
Voiced by: Hiroshi Yanaka (Japanese); Jamieson Price (English)
One of the "Original Dozen," the first colonists to arrive on Mars, Volk's life has been greatly extended by science. Ruler and representative gladiator of Volk City, he is the closest thing to an overall ruler Mars has, and it was he who chose to destroy the refugee ship on which a young Layla was a passenger. He feels his responsibility very deeply, and takes every action for the greater good of Mars and its people. Their well-being is his greatest concern, and he will commit whatever sin he has to in order to ensure it. It's been implicated throughout the series that he and Westa are in a romantic relationship and have been lovers even before they were on Mars.
Westa (ウェスタ)
Voiced by: Sumi Shimamoto (Japanese); Wendee Lee (English)
Another of the Original Dozen, Westa wields authority alongside Volk, but has a much more peaceful approach to solving problems. She cares a great deal for the people of the planet, and her concern for them, combined with the fact that she does not age due to the same life-lengthening technology as Volk, has caused many of them to revere "Goddess Westa" almost as a deity. There are some implications throughout the series that she and Volk are lovers.
Nei (ネイ)
Voiced by: Mika Kanai (Japanese); Elisa Fiorillo (English)
A real 10-year-old human girl with different colored eyes. It's a mystery as to how she was born because Mars hasn't produced any children for a decade. She accompanies Layla everywhere, and is the only person or thing the stoic Layla seems to care for as the two girls have a strong bond with each other. Layla saw through Nei's disguise because she's been living outside the domed cities for so long, and has been living in the wild. Nei has been disguised and acting like a doll so she won't cause any trouble or attention to herself. She's been acting like a doll for so long that it has become a part of her a little bit. Nei follows Layla because she can act like herself and not like a doll around her. She has short blond hair-(which later turns light pink near the end of the series), and her eyes are green (right) and purple (left). In the last episode, it was revealed that "she" was mistaken for a "he". Nei is actually a female.
Speedy (スピーディ)
Voiced by: Shinichito Yanaka (Japanese); Rick Robles (English)
An 18-year-old "doll breeder," Speedy has a friendly, affable personality. Speedy finds himself drawn to Layla after watching her victory in a gladiator battle at the dome city he lived in. He is also curious about Layla's mysterious doll, Nei.
Cross (クロス)
Voiced by: TBA (Japanese); TBA (English)
The only other remaining member of the Original Dozen besides Volk, Westa and Jupiter, Cross (formerly known as Ares) left the dome cities after a disagreement with Volk-(who is later revealed to be his older brother) and lived in the wilds. He adopted Layla after the colony ship she and her parents were aboard was destroyed and trained her in gladiator combat.
Garcia
Voiced by: Katsuyuki Konishi (Japanese); Scott Burnett (English)
A barbaroi gladiator, Garcia encounters Layla early in her journey when she briefly became the representative gladiator of a dome city. Layla defeats Garcia in combat, but chooses to spare his life. Their paths cross again several times afterwards, including one incident in which Garcia assists Layla and her party in fighting off the vicious hunter dolls pursuing Nei.
Pan (パーン)
Voiced by: Isshin Chiba (Japanese); Terrence Stone (English)
Jupiter
Voiced by: Kazuhiro Nakata (Japanese); Kim Strauss (English)

== Anime ==
No.	Title	Original release date
1	"Dome"	October 1, 2003
2	"Doll"	October 8, 2003
3	"Child"	October 15, 2003
4	"Adult"	October 22, 2003
5	"Silhouette"	October 29, 2003
6	"Reflection"	November 5, 2003
7	"Barbaroi"	November 12, 2003
8	"Pilgrim"	November 19, 2003
9	"Goddess"	November 26, 2003
10	"Frozen"	December 3, 2003
11	"Lunatic"	December 10, 2003
12	"Match"	December 17, 2003
13	"Outer"	December 24, 2003

== Soundtrack ==
The music for Avenger was composed and performed by Japanese duo Ali Project, which has also contributed music to several, other anime series, including Clamp School Detectives, Noir, Princess Resurrection and .hack//Roots. The series opening "Lunar Eclipse Grand Guignol" (月蝕グランギニョル Gesshoku Guran Ginyoru) and ending ("Mirai no Eve") themes and the score overall are considered by some fans and reviewers to be among the show's most memorable elements. An Original Soundtrack album was released in Japan in 2003.

Avenger Original Soundtrack (Avenger O.S.T.), VICL-61218
No.	Title	Length
1.	"Gesshoku Grand Guignol (月蝕グランギニョル)"	4:22
2.	"Koufuku no Zouhei (幸福の臓篦)"	4:43
3.	"Babylon Café (バビロン・カフェ)"	6:50
4.	"MOTHER"	5:17
5.	"Horobi no Hakobune (滅びの方舟)"	3:41
6.	"Agape (アガペー)"	2:49
7.	"Matenrou no Uro (摩天楼の虚)"	2:43
8.	"Muku naru Shi (無垢なる士)"	2:35
9.	"Shoujo Junketsu (少女殉血)"	4:54
10.	"Ningyoutsukai (人形使い)"	2:06
11.	"Trompe-l'oeil Meikyuu (トロンプイユ迷宮)"	2:43
12.	"Eien-teki Heisoku (永遠的閉塞)"	2:19
13.	"Kuroi no Ko-Doll (黒衣の小ドール)"	2:10
14.	"Mayu (繭)"	3:52
15.	"Kinyoku to Bi (禁欲と美)"	2:12
16.	"Torawareta Tamashii (囚われた魂)"	2:40
17.	"Akai Hoshi (赤い星)"	2:11
18.	"Jigoku no Kisetsu (地獄の季節)"	5:02
19.	"until the end of the world"	3:19
20.	"Mirai no Eve (未來のイヴ)"	4:32
Total length:		1:11:00
