= Phantom of Inferno =

Japanese adult visual novel game

- Japanese DVD cover of Phantom of Inferno
- Video game
- Developer: Nitroplus
- Publisher: Nitroplus (PC): JP: Digiturbo (DVD, Xbox 360); JP: PrincessSoft (PS2); NA: Hirameki (DVD)
- Genre: Eroge, Visual novel
- Platform: PC, DVD, PS2, Xbox 360
- Released: February 25, 2000: Original PC; JP: February 25, 2000; JP: September 17, 2004 (Integration) DVD; JP: October 26, 2001; NA: September 10, 2002 PS2; JP: May 22, 2003 Remake Xbox 360; JP: October 25, 2012 PC; JP: August 30, 2013; WW: September 6, 2026
- Light novel
- Written by: Gen Urobuchi
- Illustrated by: Konchiki
- Published by: Kadokawa Sneaker Bunko
- Original run: June 1, 2002 – December 1, 2002
- Volumes: 2
- Original video animation

Phantom – The Animation
- Directed by: Keitaro Motonaga
- Written by: Shoji Harimura
- Studio: Earth Create, KSS
- Licensed by: US: Media Blasters
- Released: February 27, 2004 – November 26, 2004
- Episodes: 3
- Anime television series

Phantom: Requiem for the Phantom
- Directed by: Kōichi Mashimo
- Produced by: Nobuhiro Osawa
- Written by: Yōsuke Kuroda
- Music by: Hikaru Nanase
- Studio: Bee Train
- Licensed by: AUS: Madman Entertainment; NA: Funimation Entertainment; UK: Manga Entertainment
- Original network: AT-X; TV Aichi; TV Osaka; TV Tokyo
- English network: US: Funimation Channel
- Original run: April 2, 2009 – September 24, 2009
- Episodes: 26
- Manga

Phantom: Requiem for the Phantom
- Written by: Nitroplus
- Illustrated by: Masaki Hiragi
- Published by: Media Factory
- Magazine: Monthly Comic Alive
- Original run: May 23, 2009 – March 23, 2010
- Volumes: 3

Phantom of Inferno (also known as Phantom -PHANTOM OF INFERNO-) is an adult visual novel game created by Nitroplus, directed and written by Gen Urobuchi. It was distributed in North America by Hirameki International, a subsidiary of the Japanese visual novel publisher Hirameki. The game was released for PC in Japan in 2000, followed by a DVD version in 2001 and a PS2 port in 2003. It was distributed in North America as an AnimePlay DVD title in 2002. The story can follow either a dark action-drama path or a romantic drama depending on the player's choices. A remake for the Xbox 360 was released in 2012 and ported to PC in 2013. It was released on Steam with English and Chinese translations in 2026.

== Plot ==
Phantom is an interactive (choose your own adventure) video game that has been adapted into a three-part OVA anime series, a 26-episode television anime series, and a three-volume manga.

=== Video game ===
Phantom of Inferno follows the life of a 15-year-old Japanese boy who is kidnapped after witnessing the murder of a reporter. His memories are erased, and he is given the choice of joining 'Inferno' or dying. After joining the organization, he is given the name 'Zwei' (German for 'two') and is trained by 'Ein' (German for 'one'). Ein is also known as 'Phantom', the title given to Inferno's top assassin.

Inferno is described as the 'United Nations of crime syndicates'. As Zwei progresses through training and various missions, deceit and betrayal occur even within Inferno, gradually placing him in increasing danger. Along the way, Zwei meets a girl named Cal Devens and, although he tries to protect her, she is eventually drawn into Inferno and becomes the assassin Drei (German for 'three').

The game is divided into three chapters. The first chapter deals with Zwei being trained as a killer and has two main routes: the Ein route and the Claudia route. Regardless of the route chosen, the chapter ends with Scythe escaping and Ein presumably dead, unless the player chooses to escape back to Japan. The second chapter begins one year after the events of the first chapter and deals with Claudia's plan to bring the Godoh group into the organization, Scythe's revenge, and the introduction of Cal Devens. It contains the Cal route and the final Claudia route.

=== Phantom - The Animation ===
The OVA series follows Zwei as he travels to America, where he witnesses an assassination that leads to his memory loss and indoctrination into Inferno. Although it is not as extensive as in the game, the OVA depicts Zwei's training before he joins Ein in an assassination. While it follows a different path, deceit and betrayal tear Inferno apart and place Ein and Zwei on opposite sides, eventually leading to a climactic battle between them at the end of the anime.

== Release history ==
Phantom of Inferno was released on PC on February 25, 2000.

A DVD version with added voice acting but with the sex scenes removed was released on October 26, 2001. A port to the PlayStation 2, based on the DVD version, was released on May 22, 2003.

Phantom Integration, an updated PC version with a new ending but without voice acting, like the original PC release, was released on September 17, 2004.

In 2010, Nitroplus announced that the game would be remade for the Xbox 360, featuring the same scenario but based on the character designs created for the anime series by Bee Train. Character designs by Minako Shiba, Yoko Kikuchi, Tomoaki Kado, Yoshimitsu Yamashita, and Yoshiaki Tsubata were introduced into the 360 version. The cast of the anime series also reprised their roles for the updated version. It was released on October 25, 2012, and ported to PC on August 30, 2013. A Steam release with English and Chinese translations was launched on September 6, 2026.

== Anime series ==
Nitroplus and Kadokawa Shoten adapted the story into an anime series produced by Bee Train and directed by Koichi Mashimo, titled Phantom: Requiem for the Phantom. Staff members include writer Yosuke Kuroda, who co-wrote and supervised the scripts with staff writers Gen Urobuchi, Hideki Shirane, Noboru Kimura, Tatsuya Takahashi, and Yukihito Nonaka. Character designs were provided by Bee Train artists Yoshimitsu Yamashita, Mutsumi Sasaki, Minako Shiba, Yoshiaki Tsubata, Tomoaki Kado, and Yoko Kikuchi.

The series features music by Hikaru Nanase and theme songs by Kokia and Ali Project.

The series premiered on April 2, 2009, and ended on September 24, 2009, on TV Tokyo. It was subsequently broadcast on AT-X, TV Aichi, and TV Osaka. The anime series was also made available for Internet streaming by FUNimation Entertainment. The complete series was released in English on two DVD sets on January 18, 2011.

The series made its North American television debut on February 8, 2010, on the Funimation Channel.

== Characters ==
- Zwei (Reiji Azuma 吾妻 玲二)

The title character of the story, Zwei was an ordinary tourist from Japan before witnessing an Inferno assassination in America and being kidnapped. He was able to elude his pursuers long enough for them to realize that he possessed a natural survival instinct suited to becoming an assassin. His memory was erased through a combination of drugs and hypnotherapy, after which he became the second-generation Phantom. The name Zwei is a code name indicating that he is the second experimental assassin created by Scythe Master. Through Claudia, one of the three top executives of Inferno, Zwei is able to learn his true identity as Reiji Azuma. When he returns to Japan, he goes back to using this name. When his killing intent manifests in the anime, his eyes turn green with orange in the center. In the video game, Zwei is voiced by Kōsuke Okano. In the original video animation, Zwei is voiced by Takahiro Sakurai in Japanese and David Keefir in English. In the anime television series, Zwei is voiced by Miyu Irino in Japanese and Newton Pittman in English.

- Ein (Elen)

An assassin whose skill earned her the codename "Phantom", a designation given only to Inferno's best killer. She was found by Scythe Master and became his first test subject for his assassin-processing treatment. She has no memories of her past and is incredibly apathetic. When she escapes to Japan, she changes her name to Elen and claims to be Reiji's twin sister, Eren Azuma (吾妻 江蓮). A long and rigorous investigation by her and Reiji traces her history back to Ulaanbaatar, Mongolia, although the trail ends there. Elen is nevertheless able to find some peace in the area. In the OVA, she is shown to have an older brother, and it is suggested that the village where she lived was massacred. While her name is spelled and pronounced "Elen" in the video game, it is erroneously spelled and sometimes pronounced "Eren" in the anime. In the video game, Ein is voiced by Omi Minami. In the original video animation, Ein is voiced by Omi Minami in Japanese and Mela Lee in English. In the anime television series, Ein is voiced by Ayahi Takagaki in Japanese and Lindsay Seidel in English.

- Claudia McCunnen

A beautiful executive of Inferno who is quick to befriend and manipulate Zwei. Although she appears to have good intentions, she quietly manipulates Inferno and its actions. This cunning and two-faced nature is never shown in the OVA. In the video game, Claudia is voiced by Kikuko Inoue. In the original video animation, Claudia is voiced by Kikuko Inoue in Japanese and Cindy Robinson in English. In the anime television series, Claudia is voiced by Aya Hisakawa in Japanese and Colleen Clinkenbeard in English.

- Lizzie Garland

Claudia's loyal childhood friend and bodyguard. In the video game, Lizzie is voiced by Ai Orikasa. In the original video animation, Lizzie is voiced by Ai Orikasa in Japanese and Megan Hollingshead in English. In the anime television series, Lizzie is voiced by Akeno Watanabe in Japanese and Shay Moore in English.

- Scythe Master (Helmut von Giuseppe)

A scientist with sadistic delusions of grandeur. He is the creator of Ein, Zwei, Drei, and the members of the Zahlenschwestern. He is referred to as Master Scythe in the OVA dub. In the video game, Scythe Master is voiced by Ken Narita. In the original video animation, Scythe Master is voiced by Kazuhiro Nakata in Japanese and Dave Mallow in English. In the anime television series, Scythe Master is voiced by Isshin Chiba in Japanese and Kent Williams in English.

- Isaac Wisemel

A brutal executive of Inferno and leader of the Los Angeles gang known as the "Bloodies". In the original video animation, Isaac is voiced by Shinpachi Tsuji in Japanese and Kirk Thornton in English. In the anime television series, Isaac is voiced by Hideo Ishikawa in Japanese and Rick Keeling in English.

- Raymond McGuire

A quiet and calculating Colombian drug lord whom the other executives of Inferno are quick to obey. His family name is erroneously spelled "McGwire" in the OVA and the anime. In the original video animation, Raymond is voiced by Sho Hayami in Japanese and Steve Staley in English. In the anime television series, Raymond is voiced by Susumu Chiba in Japanese and J. Michael Tatum in English.

- Mio Fujieda (藤枝 美緒)

A young girl who is unaware that her father is a boss in the yakuza. Reiji attends her high school when he and Elen escape back to Japan. Mio soon finds herself developing feelings for him. In the video game, Mio is voiced by Junko Asami. In the anime television series, Mio is voiced by Ami Koshimizu in Japanese and Leah Clark in English.

- Drei (Cal Devens)

A young girl who tries to hire Zwei, believing him to be a killer for justice, using money she had unknowingly stolen from Inferno. Zwei tries to hide her from Inferno but is unsuccessful and, in an attempt to save her life, asks her to become his assistant as he had been to Ein. After an attempt on his life, Zwei believes her to be dead and is forced to leave America and go into hiding. Cal believes that she was abandoned by Zwei and is manipulated by an exonerated Scythe, who turns her feelings into hatred for Zwei and trains her as his third assassin, Drei. Her clothing and situation—a teenage girl trying to hire an assassin to avenge her murdered sibling, beginning to fall in love with the assassin, and learning the art of killing herself—are very similar to those of the character Mathilda from the film Léon. In the anime, she is a fan of old films. Her method of dueling, in which she waits until the music from the pocket watch Reiji gave her has stopped, is a reference to For a Few Dollars More. In the video game, Drei is voiced by Satomi Kōrogi. In the anime television series, Drei is voiced by Miyuki Sawashiro in Japanese and Brittney Karbowski in English.

- Zahlenschwestern

Six girls who all underwent Scythe Master's finalized assassin-creation process. They are nearly as skilled as the first three and take far less time to train because the process used to create them was based on data from the original three. They all wear white carnival masks, similar to those worn by Zwei and Ein during one of their missions, and are named Vier, Fünf, Sechs, Sieben, Acht, and Neun. "Zahlenschwestern" means "Number Sisters."

== Routes ==
Unlike standard visual novels, in which the player usually focuses on a single girl near the beginning and then explores her story in greater depth, the story is more interleaved in Phantom of Inferno. The game is divided into three chapters, and each chapter has different routes that affect the sequence of events and vary the scenes and endings.

=== Chapter 1 ===
==== Ein's route ====
To get on Ein's route, simply think about her on the first night and call to her on the night of the final test. After returning from the bodyguard assignment, save Ein, do not let her go, and console her in the motel room. At the final confrontation at the compound, Reiji attempts to shoot Scythe, but Ein jumps into the way, taking the bullet for him. Scythe then escapes.

==== Claudia's route ====
To get on Claudia's route, the player must learn to drive the F40 and sleep with Claudia during the bodyguard assignment. The player must also choose to save Ein but instead plan to return to Inferno. During the final confrontation at the compound, Reiji is shot at by an unknown sniper, and the two play a game of cat and mouse to try to discover each other's position. Seeing someone's shadow behind him, Reiji turns and fires, hitting Ein, who had not fired even though she had gotten the drop on Reiji. Scythe then shoots Reiji and is about to finish him off when Lizzie arrives and saves his life. Scythe still manages to escape, however.

=== Chapter 2 ===
The events in chapter 2 are determined by which route the player took in chapter 1, as well as whether the player partially or completely finished those routes. Cal's path is necessary for several of the chapter 2 endings.

==== Cal's route ====
Cal's route is very strict because a single deviation will cause the game to treat it as if the player had never met Cal in the first place. Generally speaking, all the options in Cal's route will be "Cal or something else", and the player must choose the Cal-related option, such as going shopping with her. If the player turns her down once, or simply chooses not to trust her at the beginning, the story immediately assumes that the player never met her. Depending on the player's decisions, this may seem rather odd; choosing not to go shopping with Cal, for instance, completely removes her from any further scenes, almost as if she went shopping but never came back.

The exception is if the player chooses not to accept Cal's confession, in which case she will still appear in the game afterward. However, the player will not be able to get the Southbound ending and will instead be relegated to a dead end where Ein shoots the player in the desert warehouse.

If the player completed Claudia's path in chapter 1 and starts on Cal's path in chapter 2, the player must choose which path to complete. The player has the option to go to Claudia's house, which puts them on Claudia's route in chapter 2, or not, which puts them on Cal's route.

==== Ein's route ====
Reaching chapter three may be tricky, since it requires a specific set of circumstances. The player must have completed both Ein's and Cal's paths, confirmed the sniper's identity, and discovered the identities of the attackers at the harbor. After the loft is bombed, the player must choose "Hide". The player will then meet up with Ein at the warehouse and escape southward. However, Cal is still alive and believes that Reiji lied to her. She is then discovered by Scythe, who encourages this belief, which forms one of the crucial plot points of chapter three.

== Endings ==
According to the official PS2 game guidebook, the endings are as follows:

=== Chapter 1 ===
The Endless Nightmare: Reiji successfully escapes back to Japan and resumes his normal, everyday life with his family. One day, he catches a glimpse of Ein amidst a crowd, apparently having survived and presumably sent to terminate him. However, Reiji is not completely sure whether what he saw was real or merely a figment of his imagination, for he now feels as if he is living in a dream and cannot escape the fear that he will wake up in the "real world", where he is an assassin.

=== Chapter 2 ===
The End of a Long Dream: To get this ending, the player must follow Claudia's path in chapters 1 and 2, but not meet Cal, and then choose not to shoot Lizzie when she draws her gun. Reiji then goes to the warehouse in the desert and waits for Ein to find and kill him, which she does, lamenting his death and the scar left in her heart.

Southbound: To get this ending, the player must complete Ein's path in chapter 1 but not fully complete Cal's path in chapter 2, and must also identify the sniper and attackers at the harbor. Reiji goes to the warehouse in the desert and waits for Ein to kill him, but Ein asks Reiji to kill her instead, as Scythe has no more use for her and she sees no other purpose in her life. Neither is able to kill the other, and they finally vow to head south this time to start a new life together, having headed north during their failed attempt to run away from Inferno in chapter 1. This can be considered Ein's happy ending and is more or less the same as the path to chapter 3, but because Reiji has no complete relationship with Cal, the two simply head south to start a new life together.

Fugitives: This ending requires the player to follow the full Cal path in chapter 2 but not finish Ein's path in chapter 1 or Claudia's path in chapter 2. After the loft is bombed, the player must select "Hide". Cal then arrives back from her shopping trip, and Reiji vows to escape with her and start a new life together.

Vengeful Spirits: This ending requires the player to follow the full Cal path in chapter 2. After the loft is bombed, the player should select "Kill everyone". Reiji goes berserk and storms Inferno HQ, killing more than 20 men and McGuire in the process before dying of multiple wounds, as he believes Inferno has taken Cal away from him. However, Cal was not in the apartment during the explosion. She waits faithfully for him to return as he promised, finally accusing him of lying to her after the third morning.

At this point, the alternative option "Hide" simply causes Reiji to hide at the warehouse in the desert and wait for Ein to kill him, which she does not do. Instead, the two flee to Japan, progressing the game from Chapter 2 to Chapter 3. It is nearly identical to "The End of a Long Dream" ending.

From Atop the Hill: There are two variations of this ending. Both require the player to finish Claudia's route in chapters 1 and 2 completely and finish by selecting "Shoot Claudia" at the hangar. One version requires the player not to have met Cal or to have broken off the relationship early on, while the other requires the player to have gone as far as possible with the Cal route in addition to Claudia's route. Reiji remembers that he vowed to survive at all costs and shoots Claudia at the hangar, bringing her body and the disk back to Inferno.

Five years later, Inferno has united all the underworld kingpins in America and is poised to conquer the new century. The kingpins are then shot by Scythe's elite team, the Zahlen Schwestern, as part of Reiji's plan to take over Inferno and manipulate the criminal underground for himself. He is able to do this because the Zahlen Schwestern were created based on Ein's data, and, as he once tried to communicate with Ein, he manages to communicate with the Zahlen Schwestern and gain their trust. Reiji then shoots Scythe. If the player also completed the Cal route, Lizzie reports that Cal managed to assassinate McGuire in Colombia. Reiji gives her the title of Phantom, as she became his best assassin in the five years since the hangar incident. If the player did not meet Cal, she is simply not mentioned. In both variations, Lizzie is disgusted with what Reiji has become and leaves the organization for the country, where she starts a bar. Reiji finally visits Claudia's grave at a small cemetery on top of a lonely hill, looking down at the city below.

If the player is playing the DVD version, the player receives the first part of the ending password here. The ending password unlocks several extras, such as production trailers, television commercials, nearly all of the FMV sequences, and the soundtrack. However, the English-translated DVD version has the "Gun Gallery" locked for unknown reasons. The gun gallery is used to showcase all the guns in the game.

The Woman in the High Castle: Unlike "From Atop the Hill", this ending has only one version regardless of whether the player met Cal. Reiji chooses to accept his fate and allow Claudia to shoot him, helping her by pretending to try to shoot her. Reiji dies in Claudia's arms, telling her that she needs to live, reclaim everything that was stolen from her, and take revenge on Inferno.

One year later, Claudia has become involved with the new No. 2 man of the Gambino family and is slowly manipulating both him and the family for her own purposes. However, she still keeps the .38 Special cartridge from the bullet that she shot Reiji with and cannot seem to get rid of it or forget what she did that morning in the hangar. As she stands at a window looking down at the city below, she vows to become stronger or risk losing to someone like her previous, merciless self.

This ending also gives the player the first part of the ending password.

=== Chapter 3 ===
Road of the Cerulean Sky: This can be considered Ein's "true ending". To obtain this ending, do not fully complete Mio's path in chapter 3, and at the final choice, choose to go after Elen. Reiji finds her in the church, and after a tearful reunion, they get married there. Reiji insists on fighting Cal and manages to get Elen to promise that she will leave and wait for him and that he will definitely return to her. Cal arrives at the appointed time and takes out the pocket watch that Reiji bought for her two years earlier from a street vendor while they were preparing for the counter-sniping operation. She places it on the altar, opens it, starts the music, and sets the stage for the duel. When the music stops, both reach for their guns, but Reiji is faster and Cal suffers a fatal wound. As she lies dying in Reiji's arms, Cal forgives him for everything. Shortly afterward, the Godoh group sends 19 men to assault the church. Reiji nearly runs out of ammunition but is saved by the sudden appearance of Elen, and they manage to escape.

Scythe arrives after the sun has set with the Zahlen Schwestern and manages to get Shiga to back off and let him handle the situation. In the ensuing battle, Elen shoots Scythe, and all the members of the Zahlen Schwestern are killed. When the semester starts, Mio, who was rescued from the ruins by Shiga, who of course insists that it was a kidnapping motivated by money, cannot help but feel that it was a dream. Regardless, she resolves to live her life and meet the challenges of tomorrow.

Meanwhile, Elen and Reiji begin a long and arduous investigation into Scythe and Elen's past, trying to discover her identity. In the 2012 remastered edition, it is revealed that Lizzie, who was shot by Cal in the duel for Mio, survived and killed McGuire, effectively putting an end to Inferno after learning of McGuire's intentions to send men after Elen and Reiji. They eventually trace Elen's past to a Hong Kong brothel that handled young girls and then to Ulaanbaatar, Mongolia, where the trail runs cold. Eventually, a young translator advises them to go to the grasslands and look at the sky to find Ein's homeland. With no other options, they do so, and Elen discovers that this place really is her homeland. She ends the investigation, stating that she is satisfied simply to be there with Reiji.

This ending gives the player the second part of the ending password.

Cherry Blossom Avenue: This is Mio's only ending. Elen and Cal meet at the church to duel. Cal puts her pocket watch on the altar and says that once the music stops, they will shoot. Reiji appears at the last moment in an attempt to stop the fight, but the girls ignore him and fight as they do in the "Dusty Desert Trail" ending. When Elen throws a survival knife at Cal, which Cal does not notice, Reiji fires a bullet to make Cal move and avoid being killed and once again tries to reason with her, but to no avail, as Cal has no intention of making peace.

Shiga and 20 of Godoh's men arrive at the church and start shooting at the three assassins. Cal kills her way out, and Reiji persuades Elen to leave through the back door while he stays behind. When Reiji runs out of ammunition, Mio runs into the church and persuades him to use her as a hostage so that he can escape alive. Shiga orders the men to stop shooting, and Reiji and Mio safely get out and run to the school. Shiga and his men follow them but encounter Scythe Master and the Zahlen Schwestern, who also want to enter the school and kill Reiji. Shiga refuses to retreat, and the groups begin fighting each other. Meanwhile, Reiji and Mio talk in the school about various subjects. Shiga soon finds them and says that he is the only survivor. Reiji persuades him to take Mio away while he stays behind to deal with the Zahlen Schwestern. Mio initially refuses to flee but accepts Reiji's explanation when he promises to return to her once the fight is over.

While they are fleeing, Mio and Shiga are nearly killed by one of the assassins, but Reiji kills her from the window, allowing the two to reach the parking lot. Scythe notices them and orders the assassins to eliminate them. Shiga notices that the car has been sabotaged and will explode if the ignition is turned on. He removes the bomb from his car and orders Mio to hide behind a wall while he risks his life to check whether the car is safe. One of the assassins then shoots Shiga, severely wounding him, but he manages to kill the assassin and drive Mio away. When they are far enough away to be safe, Shiga dies from his wounds, unable to tell Mio not to trust Reiji.

Cal watches Shiga and Mio from a distance, satisfied because her help is not needed. Elen then appears and points a gun at Cal, saying that she considers her to be the greatest threat around. Meanwhile, Reiji manages to kill the remaining assassins but finds himself weaponless in front of Scythe's gun. Scythe compliments Reiji and calls him his best assassin, one who unfortunately was not obedient enough. During their conversation, Scythe calls Ein and Drei failed experiments. At this moment, Cal sneaks up behind Scythe and kills him for insulting her. She then tells Reiji that she will let him live for now because she owes Mio, but promises to kill him and Ein in the future.

Reiji later visits Mio, and they spend a night together, talking about various subjects and sleeping together. The next morning, Reiji leaves her because they come from different worlds. Later, Reiji meets with Mio's grandfather, the head of the Godoh group, and tells him to end his life of criminal activity for Mio's sake. The Godoh head refuses, so Reiji coldly threatens to kill everyone affiliated with the group before leaving him in shock. Later, Reiji and Elen watch Mio visiting Shiga's grave from afar at the cemetery. Elen asks Reiji if he is really sure about taking on the Godoh group for the sake of one girl, and Reiji answers that he will stay there a little longer. The final scene shows cherry blossom petals falling all around Mio as she declares that she will look toward the future with optimism.

Dusty Desert Trails: This can be considered Cal's "true ending". As with "Road of the Cerulean Sky", do not fully complete Mio's path and, at the last choice, choose to go after Drei. In this ending, Reiji rescues Mio, and they part without explanation because Reiji is still trying to prevent her from becoming involved in the situation. Cal returns and finds Mio gone and calls Reiji. Taunting her over the phone, Reiji arranges a duel at the church in one hour, intending to deliberately lose. As the music box stops and Cal is about to fire, Elen appears and forces Cal to dodge and miss. The two girls then duel, with Elen about to win, but Reiji jumps in front of Cal, blocking the knife with his back and fainting. Cal is stunned that Reiji would do something like this for her, and Elen explains that this is what he wished for.

Godoh's men attack the church, and Elen convinces Cal to take Reiji and escape through the back while she holds them off. After the sun has set, Scythe arrives at the church with the Zahlen Schwestern and marvels at the mound of corpses. Meanwhile, Cal has hidden in the school with Reiji and has reverted to her happy personality from before she became Drei. She demands that Reiji have sex with her, but just as they are about to start, three members of the Zahlen Schwestern launch a surprise attack and are taken out by Cal almost instantly. Cal then tries to draw out the other three, but one of them searches the building for Reiji and falls into his trap. Just as Reiji is about to help Cal, Scythe shoots him. Cal blows up the last two members of the Zahlen Schwestern using the chemistry lab but is forced to drop her guns when Scythe uses Reiji as a hostage. Scythe is about to shoot Cal when Elen, who has suffered fatal wounds from the battle with Godoh's men, shoots him. Elen then dies in Cal's arms.

An unspecified amount of time later, Reiji and Cal have become well-known freelance assassins known as "Phantom". They hitch a ride on a truck heading to the desert town of Santa Madelia, presumably somewhere in Mexico, as one of the gangsters there uses the term "gringo". Their target is the town's gang boss, with the whole town there to protect him. They make plans to go on holiday after the job and think about how they will always be together.

This ending gives the player the last part of the ending password.

- There is also an additional "bad" ending exclusive to Phantom Integration that can be found in Chapter 3. To acquire this ending, the player must have completely fulfilled Cal's path in chapter 2 (choose to make love to her) and then choose to search for Ein in chapter 3. This follows the "Road of the Cerulean Sky" ending until the duel between Reiji and Cal. Here, Reiji is unable to keep his promise to Elen and hesitates to shoot Cal, allowing her to win the duel. Cal stands there and wonders why Reiji did not shoot. A moment later, she is interrupted by Scythe, who arrives at the church with the Zahlen Schwestern in tow. Scythe is pleasantly surprised by the outcome of the match and compliments Cal. However, she appears dissatisfied and impulsively betrays Scythe, causing a shootout between her and the Zahlen Schwestern. Time passes until nightfall, and Cal is lying wounded on a beach, presumably having won the battle at the church. Ein arrives at the scene a moment later, seeking revenge against Cal for killing Reiji. However, Cal makes no attempt to defend herself and simply lies there, appearing regretful about the events that transpired. Elen, in turn, loses her motivation to carry out her vengeance and looks sorrowfully at the night sky. Nothing they do now will bring Reiji back, so both can do nothing but lament their loss.
