= IGPX =

Japanese anime television series

- Japanese cover of the first DVD volume

IGPX インモータル・グランプリ (Ai Jī Pī Ekkusu: Inmōtaru Guranpuri)
- Genre: Action; Mecha; Sports (combat, motorsport)
- Created by: Production I.G; Cartoon Network
- Anime television series

Immortal Grand Prix (microseries)
- Directed by: Koichi Mashimo
- Produced by: Eric P. Sherman; Maki Terashima-Furuta; Kaeko Sakamoto; Satoshi Kanuma
- Written by: Koichi Mashimo; Yuuki Arie; Eric P. Sherman; Dave Wittenberg; Jason DeMarco; Sean Akins
- Music by: Ninja Tune
- Studio: Bee Train
- Licensed by: NA: Discotek Media
- English network: US: Cartoon Network (Toonami)
- Original run: September 15, 2003 – September 19, 2003
- Episodes: 5
- Anime television series
- Directed by: Mitsuru Hongo
- Produced by: Jason DeMarco; Hidekazu Terakawa; Kenji Ōta; Kunihisa Oki
- Written by: Mitsuru Hongo
- Music by: Ninja Tune
- Studio: Production I.G
- Licensed by: NA: Discotek Media
- Original network: TV Asahi (#1–24); Cartoon Network (#25–26)
- English network: US: Cartoon Network/Adult Swim (Toonami)
- Original run: October 5, 2005 – July 2, 2006
- Episodes: 26
- icon

IGPX: Immortal Grand Prix (Japanese: IGPX インモータル・グランプリ, Hepburn: Ai Jī Pī Ekkusu: Inmōtaru Guranpuri) refers to two American-Japanese anime series co-produced by Production I.G and Cartoon Network. The first is a "microseries" consisting of five 5-minute episodes, and the second is a 26-episode animated series loosely related to the first.

== IGPX microseries ==
The Immortal Grand Prix is a tournament between teams of gun-wielding mechs. As Team Velshtein is injured, the random drawing chooses Team Suzaku, led by pilot Takeshi Noa, as the one to face Team Sledge Mamma, a trio of cybernetically enhanced cyborgs. At first, Team Suzaku does not have weapons because their mechanic U-Matsu forgot them. Amy delivers weapons from Velshtein, but Team Suzaku has a hard time controlling them. Amy's cat co-pilot Luca takes control and knocks Timmer out of his mech. Liz, out of ammo, uses her capoeira image training. She is eventually at the mercy of an opposing pilot and surrenders. The Sledge Mamma mechs shoot at Takeshi, but Amy jumps in to save him and is knocked out of the game. After being kicked around by the Sledge Mamma mechs, Takeshi reveals his plan. Using his ninjatō and shuriken, he knocks Dimmer and Yammer out of their mechs and wins. However, the series ends on a bitter note as Velshtein's owner Hamgra blackmails Team Suzaku to merge their teams and allow him to add cybernetic enhancements to their pilots, or else he will make them pay for the weapons they borrowed. The conflict is left unsolved due to the end of the microseries.

=== English cast ===
- Beau Billingslea – Yammer
- Steve Blum – Cunningham
- Sandy Fox – Amy
- Steve Kramer – Timmer
- Lex Lang – Metoo
- Wendee Lee – BT
- Julie Maddalena – Luca
- Michael McConnohie – Dimmer
- Jamieson Price – Hamgra
- Michelle Ruff – Suzaku
- Joshua Seth – Takeshi Noa
- Julie Ann Taylor – PA
- Kirk Thornton – Umatsu
- Kari Wahlgren – Liz

== IGPX TV series ==
The IGPX TV series made its hour-long premiere on November 5, 2005, at 10/9c. The series is set in 2049 and revolves around the Immortal Grand Prix, or IGPX, which is a team-based mecha-motorsport racing/combat sport-hybrid circuit. The sport is so popular that an entire city has been built for the racing industry, where competitions take place on a huge 60-mile (97 km) track. An IGPX race consists of two teams of three pilots: a forward (usually places first or second), a midfielder (usually places third or fourth), and a defender. The mechs are high-tech fighting machines driven by humans, race at speeds greater than 350 mph (560 km/h). The IGPX also contains fighting elements; attacking the opposing team to disable their mechs (thus preventing them from winning the race) is not only legal, but also expected and the primary popularity of the sport.

Each IGPX race consists of three laps, and each lap has specific rules and objectives

- This initial lap serves as a reconnaissance phase for the teams. Combat is prohibited and speed limits are enforced. Teams focus on establishing their positions on the track, evaluating the course conditions, and setting up their overall strategy. Pilots can troubleshoot any issues with their mechs during this lap.
- The second lap serves as a combat phase for the teams.. Teams activate their mech's "Battle Mode" and are allowed to engage in hand-to-hand combat. Teams are prohibited from using attacks with parts that completely detach from the mechs (intentionally or unintentionally). Mid-race 30-second repairs are permitted during this lap using specialized pit machines called "running skeletons". Each team can only utilize the running skeleton once per race.
- The final lap serves as a racing phase for the teams. Speed inhibitors are removed, allowing Teams to activate their mech's "Speed Mode"; this transforms the mech into a more streamlined, F1-style race car, greatly increasing speed. However, activating Speed Mode comes at the cost of losing all combative and defensive capabilities.

The scoring system awards points to teams based on their finishing positions in a race. The top three teams receive the most points: 15 for first place, 7 for second, and 5 for third. Lower positions receive fewer points, with the bottom three teams getting 3, 2, and 1 point respectively. Racers who are knocked out or otherwise do not finish the race receive no points. The first team to eliminate all three of the opposing team's mechs before crossing the finishing line automatically wins the match. For example, if Team Satomi wins against Team Skylark, with Satomi's pilots placing 1st and 3rd and one retiring, and Skylark's pilots placing 2nd, 4th, and another retiring, Satomi would receive 20 points (15 + 5 = 20) and Skylark would receive 10 points (7 + 3 = 10).

Team Satomi, a group of pilots, won the IG-2 championship, qualifying them for the IG-1 league. Team Satomi will now compete against the existing pilots in the IG-1 league.

The anime is Toonami's first ever original television series.

=== English cast ===
- Haley Joel Osment – Takeshi Jin
- Hynden Walch – Amy Stapleton
- Michelle Rodriguez – Liz Riccaro
- Kari Wahlgren – Luca, Michiru Satomi
- Steve Blum – Alex Cunningham
- Louise Chamis – Jane Rublev
- Peter Cullen – Opening Narration
- Erik Davies – Ricardo Montazio
- Doug Erholtz – Zanak Strauss
- Michael Forest – Hans
- Crispin Freeman – Bjorn Johassen
- Barbara Goodson – Misaki
- Mark Hamill – Yamma
- Lance Henriksen – Andrei Rublev
- Kate Higgins – Jessica Darling
- Megan Hollingshead – Judy Ballasteros
- Tom Kenny – Benjamin Bright
- William Frederick Knight – Ichi
- Lex Lang – Dew
- Mela Lee – Max Erlich
- Wendee Lee – Sola
- Julie Maddalena – Jesse Martin
- Dave Mallow – Glass Jones, MC
- Tony Oliver – Edgeraid Coach
- Michelle Ruff – Elisa Doolittle
- Stephanie Sheh – Bella Demarco, Yuri Jin
- Brianne Siddall – Johnny Lipkin
- Steve Staley – River Marque
- Karen Strassman – Fantine Valjean
- Kim Strauss – Sir Hamgra
- Julie Ann Taylor – Boy A
- Kirk Thornton – Mark Ramsay
- Cristina Vee – Sage Rublev
- Andre Ware – Dimma
- Dave Wittenberg – Frank Bullitt, Jan Michael, Timma

=== IGPX promotions ===
- A promotional DVD featuring the Comic-Con early cut of episode 1 ("Time to Shine"), the IGPX trailer, music, and a screensaver was distributed with Anime Insider v. 26 (November 2005) and Nintendo Power v. 198 (December 2005).
- Special editions of the U.S. DVD volume 1 release came with a puff pack artbox, a Team Satomi T-shirt, the first episode from the microseries and team stickers, one for each of the teams from season one.

=== Allusions ===
- Fantine Valjean's name is an allusion to the characters Fantine and Jean Valjean in the book Les Misérables by Victor Hugo. Likewise, Team Skylark member Elisa has the same name as the main character of Pygmalion by George Bernard Shaw and as the leading lady in My Fair Lady.
- Andrei Rublev bears the name of a Russian iconographer.
- In the episode "Cat vs. Dog", the owner of Team Edgeraid bears a striking resemblance to Gendo Ikari from Neon Genesis Evangelion. The man also sits with his hands crossed over his face, which was notably done by Gendo and has since been done in many other anime series. This character insertion was probably due to Production I.G working on both IGPX and the Evangelion movies.
- In "Cat vs. Dog", the mecha of Team Edge Raid have GITS painted on their arms. This is a reference to Ghost in the Shell, a franchise animated by Production I.G, who also animated IGPX. Team Satomi's mechs have the word Absolute painted on their arms, a nod to the "Absolution" spaceship featured in the Toonami commercial bumpers.
- In the final episode of IGPX, Team Black Egg's symbol is shown on the TV located on one of the triple towers that surround the track, which only shows team emblems for IG-1. This suggests that Black Egg has regained their spot in IG-1, replacing Team Skylark after they are demoted to IG-2.
- In the eighth episode of Reideen, a banner titled "Satomi" hangs in the city that Saiga Junki (the main protagonist) lives in. Production I.G's studio created both the IGPX and Reideen anime series. Both series were directed by Mitsuru Hongo.

== Production ==
Koichi Mashimo co-wrote and directed the microseries, while Bee Train animated it under supervision of Production I.G., and Bandai Entertainment acted as the North American distributor. The full-length anime series was handled by director and writer Mitsuru Hongo and was animated by Production I.G itself, with Bee Train returning for in-between animation. Production I.G president Mitsuhisa Ishikawa joined on as producer for the series. It was the first time he had worked on a joint U.S.-Japanese production, due to the Pokémon companion franchise.

The series' English dub was produced by Bang Zoom! Entertainment in Burbank, California, who directed and recorded the actors while Toonami handled the final mixing for the dub.

The program returned to the Toonami block on April 28, 2013, at 2 a.m. ET on Adult Swim. On November 21, 2014, anime distributor Discotek Media announced their license to the TV series and re-released both cuts (including Toonami cut and Production I.G cut) of the series on DVD on February 9, 2016. Discotek announced a Blu-ray version on October 17, 2023, which was released on May 28, 2024. Diskotek Media's HD remastered version of the first two episodes of the show were aired commercial-free on Adult Swim on November 5, 2023, as part of the daylight saving time bonus hour on the Toonami block to celebrate the show's 18th anniversary since its initial run on Cartoon Network (Note: This was due to the Toonami block ending prematurely that night.) and to promote its Blu-ray release. The show returned in full to the Toonami block with the HD remastered version on November 12, 2023, with the second season began airing on September 27, 2026.

== Media ==
An IGPX video game was released on September 12, 2006, for the PlayStation 2 by Bandai.
