= .hack//Sign =

Japanese anime television series

- Tsukasa (front), Aura (right), Subaru (left).
- Genre: Isekai; Adventure
- Anime television series
- Directed by: Kōichi Mashimo
- Written by: Kazunori Itō
- Music by: Yuki Kajiura
- Studio: Bee Train
- Licensed by: AUS: Madman Entertainment; EU: Beez Entertainment (former); NA: Crunchyroll
- Original network: TXN (TV Tokyo)
- English network: CA: YTV; SEA: Animax Asia; UK: AnimeCentral; US: Cartoon Network (Toonami)
- Original run: April 4, 2002 – September 25, 2002
- Episodes: 26
- Original video animation

.hack//Intermezzo, .hack//Unison, .hack//Gift
- Directed by: Kōichi Mashimo
- Studio: Bee Train
- Released: 2002 – 2003
- Episodes: 3
- Related works
- .hack video games; .hack//Liminality; .hack//Legend of the Twilight
- icon

.hack//Sign (stylized as .hack//SIGN and pronounced "dot hack sign") is a Japanese anime television series directed by Kōichi Mashimo, and produced by studio Bee Train and Bandai Visual, that makes up one of the four original storylines for the .hack franchise. Twenty-six original episodes aired in 2002 on television and three additional bonus ones were released on DVD as original video animation. The series features each characters designed by Yoshiyuki Sadamoto, and written by Kazunori Itō. The score was composed by Yuki Kajiura, marking her second collaboration with Mashimo.

The series is influenced by psychological and sociological subjects, such as anxiety, escapism and interpersonal relationships. The series focuses on a Wavemaster (magic user) named Tsukasa, a player character in a virtual reality massively multiplayer online role-playing game called The World. He wakes up to find himself in a dungeon in The World, but he suffers from short-term memory loss as he wonders where he is and how he got there. The situation gets worse when he discovers he is trapped in the game and cannot log out. From then on, along with other players, Tsukasa embarks on a quest to find the truth behind his abnormal situation.

The series premiered in Japan on TV Tokyo from April 4 to September 25, 2002. It was broadcast across East Asia, Southeast Asia, South Asia and Latin America, by the anime television network, Animax, and across the United States, Nigeria, Canada and United Kingdom, by Cartoon Network, YTV and AnimeCentral (English and Japanese) respectively. It was distributed across North America by Bandai.

The storyline moves at a leisurely pace, and has multiple layers—the viewer is often fed false information and red herrings, potentially leading to confusion until the true nature of events is revealed towards the end of the series. It relies on character development and has few action scenes; most of the time character interaction is presented in the form of dialogue. English language reception to the series has been generally positive, but some of these sources have criticised the series as a result of its slow pacing and character-driven storyline.

== Synopsis ==
=== Setting ===
The series is set in a fictional 2009, introducing a computer virus called Pluto's Kiss as the cause of a massive Internet shutdown. The results are described as catastrophic: traffic lights shut down, planes collide in midair, and the American nuclear missiles are nearly launched. As a consequence, cyberspace is subjected to severe restrictions. The virus affects all operating systems except for one, Altimit OS, the only operating system immune to all computer viruses.

Displaying ornate buildings and numerous canals lined by decorative walkways, Mac Anu (Delta Server's Root Town) is reminiscent of Venice.

Two years later free access to the networks recovers, bringing with it the release of The World: the first online game since Pluto's Kiss, developed for Altimit OS. The World is portrayed as a fantasy setting wherein player characters can be different classes, adventure by themselves to go searching through dungeons or join with others and form parties, fight monsters and level up, collect new items and participate in special events. At the center of each server is a Root Town, which contain shops, a save point, and the Chaos Gate that players use to travel between servers in the game.

Harald Hoerwick is introduced as the creator of The World. He secretly designed the game as a virtual womb in order to create the ultimate artificial intelligence (AI), by receiving emotional and psychological data from the players. His motivation is revealed to be the death of Emma Wielant, a German poet with whom he was in love; the AI, who was named Aura, would serve as the "daughter" they never had. Harald left the gathering of the required data for Aura's development at the care of the core system of The World itself, an omnipresent AI called Morganna Mode Gone. The storyline of .hack//Sign, set in early 2010, revolves around the premise of Morganna attempting to stall the growth of Aura indefinitely, after realizing that she will lose her purpose once Aura is complete.

=== Plot ===
The series follows the story about Tsukasa being mind-trapped into the game. Despite being a "fantasy quest type adventure", it does not rely on action sequences. Instead, the show is driven by mystery, slowly revealing its secrets to the viewer while paying much attention to the individual characters. Questions like what happened to Tsukasa in the real world, who he really is, and why he cannot log out are driving points of the story.

Soon after the beginning of the series, Tsukasa is led to a hidden area. There he meets Morganna, depicted as a voice without physical appearance, and Aura, who appears as a young girl clad entirely in white, floating asleep above a bed. The storyline introduces Morganna as an ally, but her real intentions are unknown at this point.

As the story progresses many characters are introduced, some who want to help, some who have ulterior motives. Then more questions arise as to "what is happening in the game itself, who are these various characters, what are their true goals and what will happen to Tsukasa". All the while he is seen struggling with his increasingly dire situation as well as his own social and emotional shortcomings. Tsukasa isolates himself, but eventually he begins to get closer to other players, and builds strong relationships with some of them; the most important is the one born between him and Subaru, a kind and thoughtful female Heavy Axeman.

In the meantime, the series follows the quest for the Key of the Twilight (黄昏の鍵, Tasogare no Kagi), a legendary item rumored to have the ability to bypass the system in The World. Some characters want the Key to gain the power this supposedly confers. Others believe the item will provide Tsukasa with a way to log out. Despite their reasons for seeking it, everyone agrees that it is related to Tsukasa in some way, as he is also a factor bypassing the system in the game. His body being in a coma in the real world adds a sense of urgency to the quest.

Near the end of the series, Tsukasa's real-life identity takes a more central place in the storyline, particularly in relation to his growing bond with Subaru. The series shows his fear and insecurity as he confesses to her that he is probably a girl in the real world. It is also at this point when Tsukasa is told Morganna's plan by a highly skilled hacker called Helba. Morganna conceived the plan to link Aura to a character who could corrupt her with negative emotional data, placing her in a state where she would never awaken. The chosen character was Tsukasa, as his mind was filled with distressful memories of his real life. Helba also suggests that when Aura is able to awaken, "the Key of the Twilight will take form".

The story reaches the climax, when Tsukasa confronts Morganna. He declares that he is no longer afraid of her or of reality, and will log out because there is someone he wants to see. This statement triggers Aura's awakening, allowing Tsukasa to log out. The last scenes feature an emotional encounter between Tsukasa's real-life self, who is shown to actually be a girl, and the real-life player behind Subaru.

=== Characters ===
Clockwise from top-left: Helba, Bear, Crim, Sora, BT, Subaru, Tsukasa and Mimiru

The primary characters in the series are Tsukasa, BT, Bear, Mimiru and Subaru (as depicted in the intro of the series).

Tsukasa is the protagonist of the story and plays a Wavemaster. At the start of the series he is seen waking up to find himself trapped in The World, unable to log out. He is initially depicted as a cynical introvert who tends to avoid others as much as possible, but his character development shows him growing to realize there are people who care about him. One of these people is Subaru, a female Heavy Axeman introduced as the leader of the Crimson Knights, a player organization designed to fight injustice (such as player killing) in The World. Most of the time Subaru is the only character preventing the Crimson Knights from running wild; she knows that they must be restrained from abusing their power. She eventually joins in the search of a way to help Tsukasa, and builds a close relationship with him.

Also close to Tsukasa is Mimiru, a Heavy Blade who is poor at planning things out and following through on them. She is the first player to meet Tsukasa, and later forms a bond with him and vows to protect him. She usually hangs out with Bear, trying to solve the mystery of Tsukasa's inability to log out. Bear is an older player of the game and plays a Blademaster. He appears as cool and collected, always willing to help out newbies. He also conducts research in the real world on Tsukasa. One of Bear's acquaintances is BT, a plotting and scheming Wavemaster.

BT teams up with Crim and Sora to find the Key of the Twilight. Crim is a powerful Long Arm, friend of Subaru who founded the Crimson Knights organization with her, but afterwards left it as he found it did not match his personality. Amiable, easygoing and sociable; he prefers to keep the real world and the game separate. Crim's stated goal when playing is simply to have fun, although he never turns down a chance to help somebody in need. Sora is a Twin Blade player killer who enjoys hunting players down, especially attractive female ones, and demanding their Member Addresses in exchange for their lives. He sees Tsukasa as the strongest link to the Key of the Twilight, and starts working with BT in the quest for it.

== Concept and design ==
The project development began in early 2000 as a joint effort between Bandai and CyberConnect2, with the original idea of producing an online game. In online games people can interact with each other and create their own stories. The producers wanted to design a game that would offer the players the same experience, but they later thought it would be more appealing with its own storyline, like in standard offline role-playing video game. According to Daisuke Uchiyama, sub-leader of Bandai's video game planning department, the result was a challenge to the RPG genre itself: an offline RPG, entitled .hack, set in a simulated MMORPG named The World.

For The World's design, writer Kazunori Ito did an extensive research on online games available at the time: the staff played titles such as Phantasy Star Online, Final Fantasy XI, and Ultima Online. Nevertheless, according to Hiroshi Matsuyama (president of CyberConnect2), they were not actively looking to make the fictional game seem like a real-life one. Instead, the idea was to create a "gigantic game system that, if the CC Corporation (the creators of The World in the game) actually existed, it would make sense for them to be behind" [emphasis added]; a game described by Matsuyama as largely "futuristic and alien".

As the project started shortly before the PlayStation 2's release, the authors seized the opportunity to make the .hack game on the new platform. This decision allowed them to develop into unexpected directions. Shin Unozawa, general manager of Bandai's game department, suggested dividing the game into four parts and release them in three-month intervals. The idea being to follow the four panel manga style as well as to keep sales constant throughout the year. Taking advantage of the PlayStation 2's capability to read DVD-Video, the authors also decided making an OVA series (.hack//Liminality) comprised by four episodes, one to go with each game. Nevertheless, they still felt the need to bolster the project with something more, therefore they decided to produce .hack//Sign, a TV show timed to air with the first game's release. For Kōichi Mashimo it was a hectic schedule: he was directing both animated projects, and was also in the midst of developing the Noir anime series.

=== Imagery ===
The real-world scenes' raw presentation denotes the predominance of The World over reality.

The virtual environment depicted in .hack//Sign draws on medieval imagery: settings range from a Venice-like city to a Gothic stone church, passing by settlements such as villages and castles; the series' scenery shows examples of Celtic art. Natural landscapes such as forests and tundras complete the setting design, which overall displays the fantasy theme seen in most MMORPGs.

Sadamoto's character designs follow the fantasy theme as well, drawing influence from the sword and sorcery subgenre in particular. Character designs also draw on Celtic imagery: Director Mashimo acknowledged similarities between Bear's design and Mel Gibson in his role as William Wallace, an example of Celtic warrior. All the characters are given distinctive patterns resembling tattoos, the visual representation of a fictional gameplay aspect called Wave.

In contrast with The World's scenery, real-world sequences are minimalist in their presentation. They display faces frequently obscured by shadows or hidden by extreme angles. The dialogue is not heard, but shown through title cards: when someone speaks the screen blacks out and a line of red or blue text appears with the dialogue. The combination of visual and acoustic noise makes reality appear as "some kind of less authentic, alternate channel".

=== Music ===
Yuki Kajiura provides a soundtrack permeated by the Celtic style and gaming theme of the series. The songs feature synthesizer and strings compositions, as well as vocals consisting of English chanting. Celtic influence is prominent in themes such as "Key of the Twilight" and "Open Your Heart". Performed by Emily Bindiger, "Key of the Twilight" blends a pulsing drum and bass mix with guitar intonations. "Open Your Heart", on the other hand, combines Bindiger's contralto vocals with an uilleann pipes solo. The .hack//Sign soundtrack also features vocals by Yuriko Kaida. "Mimiru" has her humming across a saxophone melody performed by Kazuo Takeda; in "Das Wandern" she sings over a lone piano.

European influence is prominent in instrumental pieces as well, "Foreigners" being a prime example. Reminiscent of a classic Irish diddy, the track comprises a flute dancing across a tribal-like percussion set. Orchestral music includes pieces such as "Fear" and "Kiss". "Fear" features an electronic melody wrapped around a digital-beat groove, mixed with a distant voice uttering "feeaarr!". Combining "the childlike humanity into a frightening digital reality", the song is an "analogy to the series' plot". "Kiss" is a theme that entirely features traditional symphony, although only using a few performers. It is a violin and piano mix, used to set mood in the series.

The opening theme of the series is "Obsession". Performed by Kajiura's musical group See-Saw, the track features an electric guitar and rapid electronic beat. The closing theme is "Yasashii Yoake" (優しい夜明け; "gentle dawn"), also performed by See-Saw. It is a blend of Japanese vocals, an Irish bouzouki, acoustic guitars and percussion. Both themes were released as a single on May 22, 2002, by Victor Entertainment. Three original soundtracks with vocals Emily Bindiger, with music and arrangement (and lyrics in vocals themes) by Yuki Kajiura were released. The first original soundtrack was released in North America with the limited edition of the first .hack//Sign DVD. This album is a mix of vocal themes and BGM. Most of the vocal songs and a couple of BGM tracks have strong Celtic influence. The BGM is completed with tracks with noticeable console-RPG style. The second original soundtrack was released in North America with the limited edition of the second .hack//Sign DVD. All of the tracks are fairly slow, with catchy beats. The final music soundtrack was titled ".hack//Extra Soundtrack". In North America this soundtrack was included with the limited edition of the fourth .hack//Sign DVD.

Discs

Obsession/Yasashii Yoake by See-Saw
No.	Title	Length
1.	"Obsession"	4:28
2.	"Yasashii Yoake" (優しい夜明け)	5:08
3.	"Obsession (Karaoke)"	4:28
4.	"Yasashii Yoake (Karaoke)" (優しい夜明け (Karaoke))	5:09
Total length:		19:13

.hack//Sign Original Soundtrack 1
No.	Title	Vocals	Length
1.	"Yasashii Yoake TV-SIZE"		1:31
2.	"The World"	Emily Bindiger	5:02
3.	"Kiss"		1:48
4.	"Key of The Twilight"	Emily Bindiger	3:45
5.	"Valley of Mist"		3:34
6.	"Where The Sky is High"		2:46
7.	"Fake Wings"	Emily Bindiger	2:35
8.	"Interlude"		2:05
9.	"Fear"		2:40
10.	"Aura"	Emily Bindiger	3:04
11.	"Before Dawn"		1:54
12.	"Foreigners"		2:07
13.	"BT"		2:36
14.	"A Stray Child"	Emily Bindiger	2:47
15.	"Sit Beside Me"		3:20
16.	"Magic and Sword"		2:19
17.	"A Bit of Happiness"		2:30
18.	"Silent Life"		4:08
19.	"Obsession (TV-MIX)"		1:35
Total length:			52:16

.hack//Sign Original Soundtrack 2
No.	Title	Vocals	Length
1.	"Open your Heart"	Emily Bindiger	3:31
2.	"Smallest Delight"		2:33
3.	"Labyrinth"		2:23
4.	"In the Land of Twilight, Under the Moon"		3:45
5.	"In your Mind"		3:03
6.	"Bear"		2:14
7.	"Echoes"		2:07
8.	"Cyber-Slum"		3:32
9.	"Strangers"		2:11
10.	"Where you Are"		1:26
11.	"Limits"		2:35
12.	"Broken Wings"		1:17
13.	"Mimiru"	Yuriko Kaida	3:34
14.	"Useless Chatting"		2:26
15.	"Secret Project"		2:21
16.	"Say Goodbye"		1:52
17.	"To Nowhere"	Emily Bindiger	3:15
18.	"End of The World"		3:11
19.	"Das Wandern""	Yuriko Kaida	1:26
20.	"Open your Heart～reprise"	Emily Bindiger	4:36
Total length:			53:29

.hack//Extra Soundtrack
No.	Title	Vocals	Length
1.	"Obsession (str. ver.)"		5:54
2.	"Warp"	Yuriko Kaida	3:32
3.	"Fake Wings (bitter sweet ver.)"	Emily Bindiger	1:50
4.	"Rain and Storm"		3:01
5.	"Aura (evil ver.)"	Emily Bindiger	2:11
6.	"Morganna"		4:08
7.	"Deep Despair"		1:55
8.	"Suspense & Mystery"		2:09
9.	"Fake Wings (make decision ver.)"	Emily Bindiger	3:25
10.	"Who am I?"		2:51
11.	"Digital Monsters"		2:44
12.	"Aura (Awakening ver.)"		2:21
13.	"Morganna (Tolerance ver.)"		2:32
14.	"Distrust"		2:08
15.	"The World (extra ver.)"	Emily Bindiger	5:24
16.	"attack 07"		0:11
17.	"edge (instr. ver.)"		2:25
18.	"bridge 01"		0:48
19.	"bridge 02"		0:48
20.	"bridge 03"		0:35
21.	"bridge 04"		0:59
22.	"bridge 05"		0:52
23.	"bridge 06"		0:40
Total length:			52:33

=== Themes ===
Despite its visual concept, .hack//Sign is not a sword and sorcery story, but an exposition-driven character study. It proposes "a trip inside the psychology and soul of an emotionally bruised, but slowly healing person." Themes range from psychological to sociological and are dealt with using classical dialogue as well as image-only introspection.

The somber scenery symbolizes Tsukasa's tormented state of mind.

Among the most prominent themes in .hack//Sign are anxiety, its causes, and the effects it has upon human behavior. Scenes of the real world show people living an apprehensive, even painful reality: characters' background includes subjects such as dysfunctional families and physical impediments. Tsukasa himself is psychologically affected by years of physical abuse and neglect, a state that gets worse throughout his experience in the game, where his reality disappears and he begins to doubt his own existence. When anxiety is excessive (like in the case depicted by Tsukasa's story) and can not be relieved by practical problem-solving methods, "the human ego uses maneuvers such as a defense mechanism to deny, falsify or even distort reality." The anime series explores this process as the root of emotional and behavioral issues such as detachment and isolation.

Escapism, if only as representing a consequence of anxiety, is a significant theme in .hack//Sign. The series explores how technology, such as the Internet and online games, can be used to escape reality. The World is portrayed as a means that people use "to escape their lives", assuming roles online that compensate for their shortcomings in the real world: to some, it is a place where they can overcome their physical limitations; to others, it is a social outlet or a world free of rules. In addition, the preference given to the virtual world over reality represents the intrusion of technology in the social structure: as people engage in "the wide potential of cyberspace", they become more withdrawn in the real world.

Interpersonal relationships are a prominent theme too. The show explores the psychological effects social connections have upon people with emotional needs. Initially Tsukasa shows no respect for any values or other people, but as he engages in relationships, he begins to gradually change, learning to care about others and acquiring the strength to face the reality of his life.

== Media ==
=== Releases ===
Originally, .hack//Sign was broadcast in Japan on TV Tokyo between April 4 to September 25, 2002. The same year Victor Entertainment released the entire score in three albums, along with a single containing the opening and ending of the series.

In North America, .hack//Sign was licensed and distributed by Bandai Entertainment, and dubbed by PCB Productions, who are known for their adaptations of fare like Geneshaft. The dub aired on Cartoon Network's Toonami between February 1, 2003, and March 1, 2004. The series was also released on DVD, spanning six volumes. The limited edition ran from March 4, 2003, to March 16, 2004, followed by the regular edition from March 18, 2003, to March 16, 2004. A recap episode called Evidence and the DVD only episode Intermezzo were included in the sixth volume, and Unison was only included in its limited edition. Following the multimedia concept of the franchise, Bandai also acquired the license for the .hack games, the first one being released the same month the anime series began broadcast.

The multimedia approach is shown through the DVD release as well. The limited edition not only included the three soundtrack albums of the series, but also the soundtrack of .hack//Liminality and a demo disc of the first game.

The series was compiled three times. The first DVD box set was released on October 26, 2004, by the name .hack//Sign – Complete Collection, and the second, more affordable one on August 22, 2006, by the name .hack//Sign: Anime Legends Complete Collection. Neither of these releases contains the OVA episode Unison.

Following the closure of Bandai Entertainment, Funimation (later Crunchyroll, LLC) announced at SDCC 2013, that they acquired four .hack titles including SIGN. In 2015, Funimation released the DVD boxset .hack//Sign: The Complete Series, which contains all 28 episodes, including both OVA episodes.

=== Publications ===
A compilation artbook called .hack//the visions was included in the February, 2003 issue of Newtype published by Kadokawa Shoten. The book contains .hack//Sign, .hack//Legend of the Twilight, and the .hack games illustrations which were originally shown in different issues of Newtype during 2002. Participating artists included Rei Izumi, Yoshiyuki Sadamoto, Satoshi Ohsawa, and Yuko Iwaoka.

An information book about Project .hack. was published by Fujimi Shobo in June, 2003. The book, called Encyclopedia .hack (ISBN 4-8291-7530-3), is a compilation of theories and information about storyline, setting, and characters of the franchise, taken from the series itself. Another information book about Project .hack was published by Softbank Publishing on September 27, 2003. This publication was called hack//analysis (ISBN 4-7973-2455-4) and, unlike Encyclopedia, included never-before-seen information on The World and the characters of the franchise. Information about .hack//Sign characters like Bear and BT was expanded in this book.

== Reception ==
The series has generally been positive. Holly Ellinwood of Anime Active saluted Ito's "well thought out, even provocative" storyline in the 2006 review of the series, saying that it is "far more cerebral, even existential than the anime's other less sophisticated contemporaries." Nevertheless, reviewers agree that it is the series which viewers either love or hate. According to Mike Toole from Anime Jump, it "deserves to be both maligned and admired". NeedCoffee's reviewer regarded the show as "one of the most controversial titles in recent years". Negative criticism focuses on the slow-paced story and the almost total absence of action sequences, elements which are also considered as what makes the series "most unique".

Bamboo Dong of Anime News Network called the series "interesting to watch," saying the story gets more "detailed and complex" by the show's fourth episode, praised the music selection, the voice casting, and the artwork. Dong also said that while the storyline has "aspects of mediocrity, " the storyline is intriguing and intense, and that the series is something that "has to be watched at least once." Nick Creamer of Anime News Network called the series the "grandfather of MMO anime," saying it is mellow, contemplative, and slow. He further said that the show puts you in the middle of relationships between the character and although these are not originally described, views come to understand the logic behind their actions, and added that the "underlying art" of the series holds up. He also said that the series has consistent backgrounds, a diverse music score, and calls the anime, ultimately, a story of "anxiety and identity and virtual selves."

The series received high marks for technical aspects. Chris Beveridge from Anime On DVD feels the animation is "gorgeous" and the "colors are lush and vivid". Tasha Robinson from SCI FI Weekly says that "The World's hugely varied settings provide ever-changing backgrounds," which are considered by Rob Lineberger of DVD Verdict as "detailed and innovative". In his review of the first English release, Mike Toole described the series as "a beautiful, rich-looking series, with frequently sumptuous character design and animation that's only emphasized by the quality of the DVD." A negative opinion is expressed by Rob Lineberger himself, who says that "many of the animated sequences were static characters with slightly moving lips." Tasha Robinson, instead, shows a more neutral perspective on this subject, saying that "the animation is simple but attractive." A concern several reviewers express is that the gaming environment the series tries to simulate should be more crowded, being a game supposedly extremely popular worldwide. A different opinion is that of Anime Academy's reviewer, who writes that the anime's depiction of the game-world setting is realistic and accurate.

Bandai's release earned praise for the quality of the video transfer and the DVD extras (particularly in the limited edition). Reviewers appreciated the English voice acting: Lauren Synger from DVD Vision Japan feels that "everyone was very appropriate to their characters", noting that Brianne Sidal did an excellent work capturing Saiga's Tsukasa. Lineberger, in contrast, finds the English dub to be "antiseptic and uninspired". Bamboo Dong of Anime News Network thinks for her part that Mimiru sounded bland and poorly executed, but overall, the actors did a good job "delivering their lines and giving life to their characters."

Ridwan Khan of Animefringe welcomes the "excellent" .hack//Sign score composed by Yuki Kajiura, which is hailed by Mark McPherson from Anime Boredom as "the best orchestrated track ever made for a television series". Most reviewers agree that the soundtrack is one of the series' most prominent features. A negative criticism on the music is that it tends to overwhelm the dialogue in the first couple of episodes. Kōichi Mashimo has stated that he specifically had the music louder than the dialogue as he tried to do some experimentation, and it was his intent to draw complaints from the audience. Still, Chris Beveridge thinks it is an "interesting device to sort of ratchet up the speed of things."
