= Kingdom =

Kingdom commonly refers to:

- A monarchic state or realm ruled by a king or queen
  - A chiefdom, governed by a chief
- Kingdom (taxonomy), a category in biological taxonomy

Kingdom may also refer to:

== Arts and media ==
=== Television ===
==== Episodes ====
- "Kingdom" (Friday Night Lights), a 2010 television episode
- "Kingdom" (Runaways), a 2017 television episode

==== Series ====
- Kingdom (British TV series), a 2007 British television drama starring Stephen Fry
- Kingdom (American TV series), a 2014 US television drama starring Frank Grillo
- Kingdom (South Korean TV series), a 2019 South Korean television series
- Kingdom: Legendary War, a 2021 South Korean television series
- Kingdom (2025 TV series), a nature documentary series starring David Attenborough

=== Music ===
- Kingdom (group), a South Korean boy band
- Kingdom (Koda Kumi album), 2008
- Kingdom (Bilal Hassani album), 2019
- Kingdom (Covenant Worship album), 2014
- Kingdoms (Life in Your Way album), 2011
- Kingdoms (Broadway album), 2009
- Kingdom (EP), 1998, by Vader
- "Kingdom" (Dave Gahan song), 2007
- "Kingdom" (Maverick City Music and Kirk Franklin song), 2022
- "Kingdom", a song by Battle Beast on their 2013 album Battle Beast
- "Kingdom", a song by Bury Tomorrow on their 2012 album The Union of Crowns
- "Kingdom", a song by Common on his 2014 album Nobody's Smiling
- "Kingdom", a song by Susumu Hirasawa on his 1995 album Sim City
- "Kingdom", a song by Soulfly on their 2010 album Omen
- "Kingdom", a song by Devin Townsend on his 2000 album Physicist and the 2012 Devin Townsend Project album Epicloud
- "Kingdom", a song by Twelve Foot Ninja on their 2012 album Silent Machine
- "Kingdom", a song by Ultramarine on their 1993 album United Kingdoms
- "Kingdom", a song by Wolf & Cub on their 2006 album Vessels

=== Other media ===
- Cookie Run: Kingdom, a 2021 video game by Devsisters
- Kingdoms (board game), by Reiner Knizia
- Kingdom (comics), a comic series by Dan Abnett and Richard Elson published in the weekly 2000 AD
- Kingdom (magazine), an American quarterly
- Kingdom (manga), a 2006 Japanese manga
  - Kingdom (2019 film), a Japanese live action film based on the above
- Kingdom (video game), 2015
- Kingdom (2025 film), an Indian film by Gowtam Tinnanuri

== People ==
- Park Yong-Wook, also known as "Kingdom", a professional Korean StarCraft player
- Isambard Kingdom Brunel (1806–1859), English engineer
- Johnny Kingdom (1939–2018), English wildlife filmmaker
- Roger Kingdom, American hurdler

== Other ==
- Kingdom Holding Company, a Saudi investment company

== See also ==
- The Kingdom (disambiguation)
- Kingdom of God
- Queendom (disambiguation)
- Kingdome, defunct domed professional sports stadium in Seattle, Washington
