= List of Phantom: Requiem for the Phantom episodes =

Official DVD cover of Phantom: Requiem for the Phantom released in Japan

This article lists the episodes of the Japanese anime series Phantom: Requiem for the Phantom, which is animated by Bee Train and directed by Koichi Mashimo under the Project Phantom group. The series went on air on April 2, 2009, on TV Tokyo. Subsequently, the show also aired on AT-X, TV Aichi, and TV Osaka. FUNimation Entertainment is streaming the series for its North American audience.

The anime is based on the 2000 video game Phantom of Inferno.

The series is about a Japanese national who gets kidnapped by an assassin syndicate called Inferno after he personally witnesses an assassination while visiting the United States. Inferno is a criminal organization attempting to unite all known underworld mob gangs into one conglomerate. To achieve their goal, Inferno deploys its assassin operatives, who are codenamed Phantom. Among them is an amnesiac girl named Ein and the Japanese national, who was given the name Zwei as his codename after being brainwashed of his previous memory.

An announcement regarding the show was first announced in the January issue of Kadokawa Shoten's Newtype magazine with Yoshimitsu Yamashita, Mutsumi Sasaki and Yoko Kikuchi being the main animators with Bee Train being in charge of animation. Soon afterwards, a promotional video of Phantom: Requiem for the Phantom was broadcast on Biglobe. Music for the series is created under Masumi Itō, using the alias Hikaru Nanase. For the first 19 episodes, the opening song "Karma" is written and sung by Kokia and arranged by Hikaru Nanase, with the ending song "Jigoku no Mon" (地獄の門, Gates of Hell) is sung by Ali Project with CD singles released. From episode 20 onwards, a 2nd opening song "Senritsu no Kodomotachi" (戦慄の子供たち, Children of Fear) is sung by Ali Project with a 2nd ending song "Transparent" written and sung by Kokia and also arranged by Nanase. In addition, the OST of the show with CD singles by Ayahi Takagaki and Miyu Irino have been released to the public on July 8, 2009.

The Japanese DVD releases of Volume 1 came out on July 24, 2009, with subsequent releases from Volumes 2 to 10 on August 25, 2009, September 25, 2009, October 23, 2009, November 25, 2009, December 22, 2009, January 22, 2010, February 25, 2010, March 25, 2010, and April 23, 2010. FUNimation released the series on Blu-ray and DVD in 2011. A manga adaptation of the show was published in tankōbon form on May 23, 2009, by Media Factory and Nitroplus, with the manga being illustrated by Masaki Hiragi under Media Factory's Monthly Comic Alive's February issue.

== Episodes ==
No.	Title	Directed by	Written by	Original release date
1	"Awakening"; Transliteration: "Kakusei" (Japanese: 覚醒)	Koji Sawai	Yosuke Kuroda	April 2, 2009
Waking up alone inside an empty room, a young male tourist experiences a dissociative fugue state, proceeding to explore the seemingly abandoned warehouse. He is suddenly attacked by a masked female assassin, forcing himself to adhere to the "survival of the fittest". The tourist fights back and momentarily gains an advantage, removing the assassin's mask to reveal her face. He briefly sees a vision of her young self at a playground. Confused, he attempts to leave the warehouse, only for it to be surrounded by a wasteland. The assassin introduces herself as "Ein" and reveals the tourist's name as "Zwei", as she tranquilizes him after unveiling that they are "Phantoms" who live by the motto "kill or be killed". It turns out that a scientist named Scythe Master conducted an experiment on Zwei to measure his natural instincts, which was overseen by Claudia McCunnen, an executive of an mysterious organization called Inferno. A flashforward shows Zwei posing as a guard and Ein posing as a maid as they assassinate a mafia boss in Los Angeles, proving their indispensability to Inferno.
2	"Training"; Transliteration: "Kunren" (Japanese: 訓練)	Hiroshi Morioka	Kazuho Hyōdō	April 9, 2009
Ein informs Zwei that his natural talent to kill and survive makes him qualified to become an assassin. Moreover, Ein reveals that Zwei's past memories were erased by Inferno. After agreeing to join Inferno, Zwei personally trains under Ein for several days, ranging from hand-to-hand combat to target practice in order to hone his talents as a potential assassin. One day, Ein is deployed by Scythe Master for a mission. At the same time, Claudia discreetly arrives at the warehouse and tells Zwei that Inferno has the goal to unify the criminal underworld. Claudia explains that Ein is the most powerful assassin working for Inferno, though Zwei may gain enough speed to reach the top as well. Ein carries out her mission in the United States to assassinate a person of interest. Before leaving for an assignment, Claudia says her goodbye to Zwei. As Ein returns to the warehouse, Zwei says that they are not slaves for Inferno, according to Claudia. However, Ein remarks that their way of life comes with a burden that they must bear.
3	"Practice"; Transliteration: "Jissen" (Japanese: 実践)	Tomoyuki Kurokawa	Shōgo Yasukawa	April 16, 2009
After training Zwei in the art of using a combat knife, Ein is given a overnight checkup by Scythe Master. A lieutenant of the Navy SEALs named Wallace, who is an arms dealers for Inferno, found an FBI agent named Theodore Brice dead in Tijuana. Claudia and Scythe Master bring Claudia's friend and bodyguard Lizzie Garland as well as Colombian drug lord Raymond McGuire to the warehouse, where Wallace is exposed for also being an arms dealers for a South American terrorist group called Noche de Sangre. Zwei is put to the test, having to kill Wallace after giving him a ten-minute head-start inside the warehouse. Despite initial hesitation, Zwei confronts Wallace, who tries to talk his way out of being assassinated. When Wallace nearly threatens Zwei to the brink of death, Zwei uses his natural instincts by stabbing Wallace in the right arm with a combat knife before shooting Wallace in the head with a revolver. Full of regret, Zwei wishes for Ein to kill him, but Ein fires away from Zwei to completely awaken his natural instincts.
4	"Assassination"; Transliteration: "Ansatsu" (Japanese: 暗殺)	Shinya Kawatsura	Yōsuke Kuroda; Yukihito Nonaka	April 23, 2009
After accompanying Ein at a shopping mall to memorize the floor plan, Zwei is given a U.S. passport with the pseudonym "Wallace Yang", a student living in Los Angeles. For their first joint mission, Zwei and Ein are deployed to kill Don Lucio, a high-rolling Dallas mafia boss and a recluse at his mansion. Don plans to buy a birthday present at the shopping mall for his granddaughter on the following day. At the water fountain, Ein causes a scene with Zwei to avoid being tracked by guards working under Don. Slipping through the back alleyway behind the antique shop, Zwei and Ein cut it close when Don prepares to be chauffeured away. After Don is successfully assassinated, Zwei and Ein become outnumbered by more guards until Scythe Master arrives in a getaway car to help them flee for safety. Scythe Master later informs Claudia that he has arranged for Zwei and Ein to lay low at a remote location. Ein contemplates that it took her two years of training before being indoctrinated by Inferno, yet it only took Zwei three months of training to achieve the same thing.
5	"Moment"; Transliteration: "Setsuna" (Japanese: 刹那)	Tsuyoshi Yoshimoto	Hideki Shirane	April 30, 2009
A conservative mafia boss named Tony Stone owns an area in Los Angeles called Melanie Square. Tony draws the line at hard drugs and cares deeply for his henchmen. After a brief training session with Ein, Zwei spends time with Claudia while Lizzie is away on another assignment. Claudia orders Zwei to monitor Tony's wife Eva Stone and son Duke Stone. Seeing as Inferno wants to acquire Melanie Square, Tony has no choice but to set up a meeting with Claudia. While visiting an amusement park with Ein, Zwei briefly spots Tony, Eva and Duke. During the meeting, Claudia urges Tony to forfeit Melanie Square, but Tony refuses and orders his henchmen to kill Claudia and Lizzie. Ein snipes the majority of Tony's henchmen, including Rob and Lutz, from an adjacent building, allowing Claudia and Lizzie to escape. Meanwhile, Zwei infiltrates Tony's residence with murder written all over his eyes. After shooting Eva, Zwei hesitates before proceeding to shoot Duke as well.
6	"Conflagration"; Transliteration: "Taika" (Japanese: 大火)	Tomoyuki Kurokawa	Gen Urobuchi	May 7, 2009
After a funeral is serviced for Eva and Duke, Tony and his right-hand man Anton Claude plan to release documentation on fifteen mafia bosses who are suspected of supporting Inferno. However, the executives of Inferno are aware of this, prompting Scythe Master to arrange for Zwei and Ein to conduct a spree of assassinations on all six mafia bosses who are suspected of opposing Inferno in various areas of the Pacific Coast. Zwei and Ein are at the forefront working with Lizzie for this complex operation. Abel and Bark, two of Tony's henchmen, are now dead, thanks to the efforts of Zwei and Ein. Shooting Tony point blank in betrayal, Anton sides with Inferno, joined with police officer Cyrus Gant, as they both receive compensation for their loyalty. In the aftermath, Inferno replaces the six mafia bosses with supporting leaders to solidify its influence in the Pacific Coast. Moreover, Tony is buried in the graveyard next to Eva and Duke.
7	"The Past"; Transliteration: "Kako" (Japanese: 過去)	Koji Sawai	Kazuho Hyōdō	May 14, 2009
Ein walks out to meet with Scythe Master, while Claudia gives Zwei driving lessons in her sports car. Showing no signs of worry when Scythe Master warns that Claudia may be infatuated with Zwei, Ein is taken aback when Scythe Master claims that Ein's pairing with Zwei was mere coincidence rather than convenience. Claudia meets with mafia boss Daisuke Godo and his financial advisor Tooru Shiga, agreeing to assist Claudia in obtaining 500 kilograms of cocaine worth two million dollars. A flashback reveals that a clueless Zwei was entrusted with a note exposing the corruption of Inferno by a male reporter, who was then assassinated by Ein. Having witnessed this horrific incident, Zwei fled and stayed hidden for several days, but he was eventually caught by Ein and Scythe Master, impressed by Zwei's innate ability to survive. In the present, Ein tells Zwei that she had a dream about her homeland, though she remains apathetic towards finding out about her past life. Lizzie contacts Zwei and requests him to be Claudia's bodyguard two hours before Ein will be dispatched for a mission at a rail yard. Meanwhile, Claudia discusses her plan with Raymond to get rid of Scythe Master.
8	"Sudden Change"; Transliteration: "Kyūhen" (Japanese: 急変)	Hiroshi Morioka	Tatsuya Takahashi	May 21, 2009
At the rail yard, Ein snipes at the assault team led by Lizzie, which allows Daisuke and Shiga to escape with the cocaine shipment. Zwei retrieves his Japanese passport from Claudia at her mansion, where he discovers that his real name is Reiji Azuma. His original personality is restored after his mind is flooded with his past memories, leaving him in utter shock and full of remorse. Claudia offers Reiji to choose between staying by her side or returning to his homeland. However, Reiji realizes that he could never return to his homeland because of the blood on his hands. He returns to the warehouse and finds out that Ein is suffering from a gunshot wound in the torso caused by Lizzie during their brief confrontation. Reiji then receives a call from Claudia, who warns that Ein and Scythe Master have betrayed Inferno. Refusing to be idle, Reiji successfully removes the bullet from Ein's gunshot wound. After contemplating how he was just a pawn to Inferno, Reiji secretly evacuates Ein from the warehouse to avoid being traced by Claudia for defying her orders.
9	"Name"; Transliteration: "Namae" (Japanese: 名前)	Shinya Kawatsura	Tatsuya Takahashi	May 28, 2009
Having rejected himself as Zwei, Reiji travels the open road with Ein in tow, though Ein feels like she has no place to call home. Daisuke contacts Claudia to give his appreciation arranging a transport for the cocaine shipment, yet Shiga has his doubts about Claudia. After Reiji rips up his Japanese passport, he states that he has recovered his past memories. Reiji tells Ein that her dream is a past memory of her homeland described as a place full of sunlight and strong winds. As they stay at a motel for the night, Reiji manages to prevent Ein from committing suicide by firearm in the bathroom. Ein feels like she has no purpose in life, so Reiji consolingly gives her a new identity named Eren. While Reiji plans to hot-wire a car, Eren ends up gunning down an armed man tailing her in an alley, where she finally encounters Scythe Master. Claudia and Lizzie eventually finds Reiji in a parking lot. In an interrogation room, a captured Reiji is accused of aiding and abetting Scythe Master, but Claudia extends a lifeline by loaning a Beretta M9 pistol to Reiji, who promises to kill Scythe Master with it.
10	"Finale"; Transliteration: "Shūmaku" (Japanese: 終幕)	Tsuyoshi Yoshimoto	Shōgo Yasukawa	June 4, 2009
Lizzie learns that Scythe Master plans to escape from a wharf in the San Francisco Bay Area, but Claudia insists that Reiji should join the mission to stop Scythe Master, who is being protected by Roshenko, a militia colonel and an arms dealer. In order to win the trust of a skeptical Lizzie, Reiji fakes his persona as Zwei by loading only one bullet in his pistol. While avoiding the militia, Reiji realizes that Eren has been brainwashed by Scythe Master as she points her pistol at Reiji. Lizzie suddenly starts shooting at Eren and Scythe Master, who both run away towards a pier. Reiji hides in the shadows as he tracks Scythe Master. Due to assuming the persona of Zwei for so long, Reiji goes berserk and backs Scythe Master into a corner. When Reiji fires his only bullet at Scythe Master, an injured Eren jumps in front of Scythe Master, taking the hit to the chest and falling into the ocean. After being stunned by this outcome, Reiji is consequently shot multiple times by Scythe Master before sinking into the ocean, where Reiji recalls his promise to make Eren truly smile again someday.
11	"Succession"; Transliteration: "Shūmei" (Japanese: 襲名)	Tomoyuki Kurokawa	Yukihito Nonaka	June 11, 2009
Reiji washes up on the shore, hoping to keep his promise to Eren. A recapitulation of episodes 1 through 10 is shown. Three months later, Claudia reports to the other executives of Inferno that she has scouted two mafia organizations in the Atlantic Coast, the Renato Family in Boston and the Baldino Family in Philadelphia. After the conference meeting, another executive of Inferno named Isaac Wisemel expresses his suspicions of Claudia to Raymond, who reassures that Claudia knows what she is doing. Meanwhile, Scythe Master is seen meeting with Shiga. Claudia visits the grave of her younger brother Romero McCunnen, whose murder was witnessed by Claudia. After recovering from his wounds, Reiji bears the persona of Zwei once again and massacres multiple gunmen at a factory. Claudia and Raymond then declare Reiji as the top assassin of Inferno.
12	"Ghost"; Transliteration: "Bōrei" (Japanese: 亡霊)	Hiroshi Morioka	Kazuho Hyōdō	June 18, 2009
Six months later, Reiji kills Deluca Rezzo, the second-in-command of the Gambino Family, at an opera house in New York City, part of twenty incidents dubbed as the "Phantom Assassinations" by the news outlets. As Raymond declares that Inferno now has control of the Atlantic Coast, Claudia says that she gave Reiji the free will to stay loyal to her. Despite Isaac's concerns, Raymond permits Claudia to handle negotiations with the Godo Family to be their exclusive supplier for Japanese imports worth five million dollars. Later on, Reiji and Claudia head towards a turf run by the Bloodies, a Los Angeles gang led by Isaac. However, some members of both the Godo Family and the Bloodies have been killed by a rogue assassin. Reiji is speechless upon learning that an innocent female passerby was killed in the crossfire, seen with her arms peacefully folded. Lizzie finds out that the female passerby is Judy Devens, whose apartment had no stashed weapons. As he goes to the crime scene to mourn, Reiji chances upon Cal Devens, Judy's younger sister. Seeing Cal as a potential witness of Judy's killer, Reiji decides to protect Cal and avenge Judy's death.
13	"Camouflage"; Transliteration: "Gisō" (Japanese: 偽装)	Koji Sawai	Noboru Kimura	June 25, 2009
Isaac wants to find out who stole five million dollars from the crime scene. After treating Cal at a burger joint, Reiji allows her to tag along with him at his hideout. While doing reconnaissance for Reiji, Lizzie is approached by Isaac, who forces her to spill the beans. Taking Lizzie as a hostage, Isaac suspects Reiji of harboring Cal as a potential witness when she accidentally drops a duffel bag on the bedroom floor nearby. Isaac tells Reiji to meet at the base to plead his case at ten o'clock tomorrow morning. Even though Reiji knew all along that Cal did not see Judy's killer, he is shocked to discover that she wants to offer the five millions hidden inside of the duffel bag as payment for avenging Judy's death. Reiji pleads his case to Claudia, Raymond and Isaac at the base, making up the claim that Cal possesses the potential to become an assassin under his supervision. After the meeting, Reiji has conflicted thoughts on how to help Cal without raising suspicion from Inferno.
14	"Surveillance"; Transliteration: "Kanshi" (Japanese: 監視)	Tsuyoshi Yoshimoto	Shōgo Yasukawa	July 2, 2009
Reiji tells Cal that she will become his "assistant" for now. After Claudia convinces Daisuke and Shiga to stay in Los Angeles, Claudia later tells Reiji about her plan to use Daisuke and Shiga as bait to smoke out Isaac, whom she suspects to be the one responsible for the shootings at the gang turf. The next day, Reiji takes Cal to the shopping mall in order to buy her a new outfit. Getting pressure from Raymond, who is awaiting details on Cal's progress, Lizzie loans a SIG Sauer P226 pistol to Reiji for Cal. At the warehouse, Reiji trains Cal in target practice, applying the same teachings from Eren. Claudia then dispatches Reiji to shadow Daisuke and Shiga at a casino hotel. After hearing word from the bartender that one of Daisuke's henchmen named Muroto went to his hotel room on the ninth floor, Reiji is shocked when Muroto was already found dead by the bed. Catching a glimpse of Eren as the supposed rogue assassin in the elevator, Reiji runs down the stairway and watches her leave the casino hotel from behind. Reiji is in utter disbelief to see that Eren would be still alive.
15	"Reunion"; Transliteration: "Saikai" (Japanese: 再会)	Shinya Kawatsura	Tatsuya Takahashi	July 9, 2009
With Daisuke furious over Muroto's death, Claudia promises to smoke out the ringleader within three days. Claudia assigns Reiji to be a counter-sniper during a meeting between the Godo Family and the executives of Inferno on the fifth floor in a conference room of the Atrium Hotel. Reiji asks for Cal to assess where a sniper could be positioned relative to the conference room within a radius of 800 yards. Meanwhile, Shiga further expresses his suspicions of Claudia, though Daisuke believes that Claudia is innocent. Reiji brings Cal along to explore potential sniping locations. He gives her a pocket watch with a music box as payment for her good observation skills. They get into position on the rooftop of a nearby building. As the meeting begins, Cal spots a sniper hidden behind a water tower on an adjacent building. Reiji kills the sniper upon revealing himself, turning out to be Randy Weber, Isaac's right-hand man. However, the meeting is interrupted by a second gunshot fired, which nearly hits Daisuke, causing a standoff between parties. Reiji cannot bring himself to fathom Eren being the second sniper.
16	"Confession"; Transliteration: "Kokuhaku" (Japanese: 告白)	Tomoyuki Kurokawa	Kazuho Hyōdō	July 16, 2009
Scythe Master ordered Eren to snipe from an apartment building without killing anybody only to stir up trouble in the conference room. Claudia shoots down Isaac for being the ringleader that organized the sniper attack, which appeases Daisuke. At a bar, Reiji confides in Lizzie that the second gunshot occurred after he killed Randy, meaning that Isaac was not responsible. Reiji then plants the duffel bag containing five millions dollars at Isaac's vacation home to implicate Isaac in his treachery. At the hideout, Reiji urges Cal not to get further involved in his missions, though Cal still wants to be useful as his assistant. He regrets living the life of an assassin, pleading that she should not follow down the same path. As Cal takes a shower, Reiji deeply cares for her to avoid experiencing his world turned gray. Despite this, she still vows to be by his side forever, and he confesses that he wants to live a normal life. Meanwhile, Scythe Master frames Reiji for killing Muroto. Daisuke and Shiga force Lizzie to contact Reiji, arranging to meet her at the rail yard. Reiji leaves the hideout, promising Cal that he will live a normal life someday.
17	"Truth"; Transliteration: "Shinsō" (Japanese: 真相)	Hiroshi Morioka	Yosuke Kuroda	July 23, 2009
Claudia internally promises to take her memories of Romero to the grave. Falling for a trap set up by Daisuke at the rail yard, Reiji realizes that he is being framed for killing Muroto. Daisuke reveals to Reiji and Lizzie that Claudia was manipulating them from the beginning because Daisuke was the one who stole the cocaine shipment from the rail yard a year ago to supply his market. Reiji is bereft of words when Daisuke exploits Claudia for using everyone as pawns to further her personal goals. Suddenly, Eren snipes Daisuke in the shoulder from afar, allowing Lizzie to escape, while Reiji pursues Eren on the train. Assuming the persona of Ein, Eren retreats after warning Reiji that he will be hunted down by Inferno, leading Reiji to believe that Scythe Master is pulling the strings. Having allied himself with Scythe Master, Shiga ultimately shoots Daisuke to prevent the Godo Family from waging war with Inferno. While Lizzie is unable to find Claudia at her mansion, Reiji rushes back towards the hideout, recalling how much Cal has cherished the pocket watch. However, the hideout detonates from the inside, prompting Reiji to believe that Cal is now dead.
18	"Showdown"; Transliteration: "Taiketsu" (Japanese: 対決)	Koji Sawai	Gen Urobuchi	July 30, 2009
Reiji kills the operatives who bombed the hideout. Scythe Master and Shiga report Claudia's acts of treason to Raymond. Lizzie recalls that Claudia once promised never to cross a line of morals as they stood at the grave of Romero, who was killed by the Bloodies. While hiding out in an alley, Reiji is contacted by Claudia, who urges him to meet her at a diner on California State Route 39. After ordering Eren to hunt down Reiji, Scythe Master ponders whether this finale will end in tragedy or comedy. Lizzie locates Claudia at the diner before they go to the beach, while Reiji returns to the warehouse before Eren tracks him down. As Claudia enjoys the coastal breeze, Lizzie prepares to shoot Claudia in the head. Eren stops fighting Reiji when she finally finds her purpose to live due to her scars. Intending to do good on his promise to Eren, Reiji agrees to escape with her. A scene shows Lizzie visiting the graveyard, where Claudia is buried next to Romero. Reiji and Eren acquire Mexican passports and passes by a church. A scene shows Cal's pistol and pocket watch left behind within the rubble of the hideout.
19	"Promise"; Transliteration: "Yakusoku" (Japanese: 約束)	Tsuyoshi Yoshimoto	Yukihito Nonaka	August 6, 2009
A flashback is shown of the scene when Cal witnessed Judy's death. A recapitulation of episodes 12 through 17 depicting a summary of Cal's life with Reiji is also shown, including a new scene where Cal cleans the hideout while wearing a maid uniform. When Reiji was summoned to the rail yard, Cal fixed an old videocassette recorder. As she passed by a video store to rent some movies, a backdraft is seen at the hideout, hinted by a movie poster displayed on the window of the video store. As the flames were extinguished by the fire department, Cal waited inside the hideout, hoping Reiji would return as promised. While tearfully exclaiming that Reiji broke his promise and abandoned her, Cal was then approached by Scythe Master. Meanwhile, Reiji and Eren have crossed the border into the outskirts of Mexico.
20	"Hometown"; Transliteration: "Kokyō" (Japanese: 故郷)	Shinya Kawatsura	Yōsuke Kuroda	August 13, 2009
It has been two years since Reiji and Eren fled from North America and settled in Japan, living peacefully in a small town where they attend school at Shinokura Academy. One day, Reiji is dragged to the school rooftop by his classmate named Sanae Kubota, who introduces him to Eren's classmate named Mio Fujieda. After Mio confesses her feelings for Reiji, Eren interrupts the moment. Sanae and her friend Hirono Inada eavesdrop when Reiji agrees to hang out with Mio as friends. While Reiji and Mio go sightseeing in town, they encounter a female biker who fires a familiar pistol near them as a warning shot, causing Reiji to leave abruptly. At a chapel, Reiji informs Eren that they have been found by Inferno. Eren reveals that Mio is Daisuke's half-sister who is unaware of the Godo Family, led by her father Kaiten Godo. Therefore, Reiji and Eren could use Mio as leverage against Inferno. Eren comforts Reiji when he sees this as going back to square one. The next day after school, Reiji shockingly encounters the female biker from before. She removes her helmet to reveal herself as none other than Cal.
21	"Anger"; Transliteration: "Funnu" (Japanese: 憤怒)	Tomoyuki Kurokawa	Shōgo Yasukawa	August 20, 2009
At the chapel, Reiji tells Eren that Cal is alive and working for Inferno as an assassin named "Drei". Lizzie and Scythe Master begin an operation to kill off a rival Chinese mafia leader named Kenho "Xu" Jo, along with Enho "Wang" Ko, an old man who previously helped Scythe Master escape from Inferno. As Scythe Master boasts to Lizzie that Cal can finish the job within ten seconds, Cal charges in and shoots Wang first before shooting Xu during a game of fast draw. Reiji expresses guilt for introducing Cal to the criminal underworld. Lizzie is later told by Scythe Master that Cal must kill Reiji with her own hands to become next top assassin. Reiji and Eren sit with Mio, Sanae and their friend Atsushi Motegi in the school cafeteria during lunchtime, but Eren suddenly needs to depart after Hirono gives her a small packet, which secretly contains the case of a cartridge. While losing track of Eren, Reiji runs into Scythe Master, who reveals that he refined Cal's hatred towards Reiji in order to enhance her natural talent to kill. Scythe Master hints that Cal may be targeting Eren, who is seen at the chapel.
22	"Fury"; Transliteration: "Gekkō" (Japanese: 激昂)	Hiroshi Morioka	Tatsuya Takahashi	August 27, 2009
Reiji arrives at the chapel right when Eren and Cal point their pistols at each other, though Lizzie soon barges in and orders Cal to withdraw. Before leaving, Lizzie warns Reiji and Eren that Inferno is hot on their tracks. Reiji uses Mio as leverage by contacting Shiga to guarantee safety from Inferno. On a swing set, Reiji admits to Eren that he empathizes with Cal. Lizzie and Scythe Master are given the order to secure Mio, while Shiga arranges for his henchmen to surveil Mio in the meantime. At a bar, Lizzie realizes that Cal is bent on killing Reiji for abandoning her. Sanae and Hirono trick Reiji and Mio into going to the movie theater together, while Eren plans an escape route by negotiating with a smuggler who owns a cargo boat. Sitting by a water fountain after watching a movie, Mio is impressed that Reiji appreciates the little things in life. As Mio takes her leave, Cal approaches Reiji, who gladly wishes for her to kill him and leave Eren alone, but Cal departs after punching Reiji in retaliation. Cal later easily defeats some thugs who surround her in an alley.
23	"Decision"; Transliteration: "Ketsudan" (Japanese: 決断)	Kōji Sawai	Kazuho Hyōdō	September 3, 2009
Mio, Sanae and Hirono recently notice that Reiji seems to be out of touch. The cargo boat is arranged to transport Reiji and Eren in five days. While searching for Cal, who has gone missing along with several weapons, Lizzie feels obligated to protect Cal, who has been manipulated by Scythe Master. Reiji briefly hangs out with Mio without sharing much details about why Cal previously punched him. When Mio returns home, she is approached by Cal, who forces Mio to hop on her motorbike. Cal is halted by Lizzie at a bridge, where Lizzie admits that Reiji never intended for Cal to become an assassin. However, Cal shoots Lizzie after a game of fast draw. Bringing Mio to a derelict house as a hiding place, Cal reveals that Reiji was an assassin who killed Mio's half-brother Daisuke. When Cal contacts Reiji to threaten Mio's life if he skips town, Eren tells him that they must act independently. Eren will go underground to take out Cal and rescue Mio, while Reiji will comply with Cal's wishes. Meanwhile, Scythe Master assures a furious Shiga that Mio will be returned safely, thanks to his newly pioneered army of super soldiers.
24	"Confrontation"; Transliteration: "Taiji" (Japanese: 対峙)	Tomoyuki Kurokawa	Yōsuke Kuroda	September 10, 2009
Reiji wants to smooth things over with Cal before Eren decides to act independently. Upon hearing from Sanae and Hirono that Eren left school early, Reiji realizes that Eren set out to hunt down Cal without his consent. Mio tries to reason with Cal over her hatred for Reiji, but Cal teaches Mio the true meaning of despair by ripping her school uniform. Meanwhile, Shiga is unfortunately told by Kaiten that the Godo Family will not get involved with rescuing Mio from captivity. Scythe Master makes his final preparations to deploy his super soldiers collectively called Zahlenschwestern (Vier, Fünf, Sechs, Sieben, Acht and Neun). Filled with regret, Call uses Mio's cellphone and contacts Eren, arranging to meet for a final duel to the death at three o'clock in the morning and revealing that Mio is being kept at a demolished girls' dormitory. Eren brings a change of clothes and a backup cellphone, unveiling the truth that she is an assassin along with Reiji and Cal. Advising Mio to hang back for awhile longer, Eren sets out to kill Cal before Reiji runs into trouble.
25	"Conclusion"; Transliteration: "Ketchaku" (Japanese: 決着)	Shinya Kawatsura	Gen Urobuchi	September 17, 2009
After being rescued by Shiga, Mio finds herself in her bedroom. After a conversation with her mother, Mio realizes that she could never belong in Reiji's world turned gray, contacting Reiji about the final duel to the death at a place where Eren and Cal intend to meet. Cal is haunted by the ghosts of Judy, Lizzie and Xu, who all instill doubts over her conversion as an assassin. Reiji finds Eren at the chapel, where he elects to be the one to assassinate Cal and achieve closure, though Eren questions her freedom to achieve closure of her own. Cal enters the chapel and faces off against Reiji, while Eren thwarts Shiga and his henchmen from interfering. Reiji manages to shoot Cal after a game of fast draw. Before she dies, Cal wonders what her life could have been like if Reiji never abandoned her. He comforts her until she quietly dies in his arms. With Shiga left wounded by Eren, Scythe Master soon appears, accompanied by Zahlenschwestern.
26	"Eren"; Transliteration: "Eren" (Japanese: 江漣)	Tomoyuki Kurokawa	Yōsuke Kuroda	September 24, 2009
Reiji and Eren engage in an intense battle against Zahlenschwestern, killing Neun and Fünf in the woods first. While Reiji takes out Vier and Acht in the old school building and in the chapel, Eren easily defeats Sechs and Sieben before gaining the courage to pull the trigger on an unarmed Scythe Master. Later during the day, Mio, Sanae, Hirono and Atsushi see barricade tape surrounding the chapel and the old school building. Six months later, Reiji digs up information about Scythe Master, whose real name is Helmut von Giuseppe. In Hong Kong, Reiji learns that Giuseppe adopted a girl at an orphanage five years ago. With Eren fitting this description, Reiji takes her to her homeland in Ulaanbaatar, where Eren relives her childhood memories when she stares at the sky hovering above the plateau. When they reach their destination in a field of locoweed, Reiji collapses to the ground after being killed by a silencer from an unknown assailant driving a horse cart. Reiji dies knowing that he kept his promise of being able to make Eren truly smile again someday.

== Original soundtracks ==
Phantom Requiem for the Phantom Original Soundtrack

Soundtrack album by Hikaru Nanase Tatsuya Kato KOKIA Ali Project
- Released: July 8, 2009 (Vol. 1); September 30, 2009 (Vol. 2)
- Genres: Soundtracks; Original score
- Label: Lantis
- Producers: Koichi Mashimo; Yoshiyuki Ito

Two original soundtracks featuring Hikaru Nanase's score were released in 2009. Both albums featured the TV cut of the opening and ending themes by Kokia and Ali Project. Koichi Mashimo executive produced the album and Nanase's husband Yoshiyuki Ito acted as the music producer. Album two also features the instrumental version of the Zwei image song "Haitoku no Gajou" written by Tatsuya Kato.

=== Track List ===
Volume 1 All tracks by Hikaru Nanase except where noted.

1. Requiem for the Phantom Part I
2. Struggle for Zero
3. Assassin
4. Blissout
5. To Kill or Not to Kill
6. Haste and Pursuit
7. Canzone of Death Part II
8. To Love or not to Love
9. Seikou no Amaki Daishou
10. Ecstasy of Killing
11. Reservoir City
12. Requiem for the Phantom Part II
13. Another Canzone of Death
14. Requiem Last
15. Koroshi no Perfect Game
16. Barren Wilderness
17. Chaser
18. Requiem for the Phantom part III
19. Emptiness
20. Perfect game
21. Hell of a girl
22. Watchdog's Oci Ciornie
23. Yaruse nai Toiki
24. Whisper of Meadow
25. Ame no Suteneko
26. Canzone of Death Part III
27. Kiyoraka na Kagayaki to Kibou
28. Knife in the Bathtub (Bathtub no Naka no Knife)
29. Stranger in the Home
30. Bourei
31. Canzone of Death Part I
32. KARMA (TV Edit) perf. KOKIA
33. Jigoku no Mon (地獄の門?, "Hell's Gate" - TV Edit) Ali Project

Volume 2

1. Catastrophe (カタストロフ)
2. Phantom Children A (ファントムチルドレンA)
3. Haste and pursuit version
4. Battle of crimson
5. Nichijou no Hitokoma (日常のひとこま)
6. Seijaku to Kyoufu (静寂と恐怖)
7. Lizzie Betsuri (リズィ別離)
8. Canzone of Heart
9. Nostalgic
10. Kako Kara no Sasoi (過去からの誘い)
11. Cal (キャル)
12. Canzone of choir
13. air&suspisoin
14. Requiem cello
15. Canzone of voice
16. Requiem
17. Whisper of meadow partII
18. Discover
19. Superstar (written by Tatsuya Kato)
20. Snake Head (スネークヘッド)
21. Phantom Children B (ファントムチルドレンB)
22. kazoku - Phantom (家族___Phantom)
23. Amai Seikatsu A (甘い生活A)
24. Amai Seikatsu B (甘い生活B)
25. Koukou 2nensei (高校2年生)
26. Jingi 1 (仁義1)
27. Jingi 2 (仁義2)
28. Nanji, Unmei wo Shiru (汝、運命を知る)
29. Mio (美緒)
30. Modae (悶え)
31. Neutral Kara Ecstasy (ニュートラルからエクスタシー)
32. Kiyoraka na Owari (清らかな終わり)
33. Nichijou Kara Suspense he (日常からサスペンスへ)
34. Namida Kara Shinkoku he (涙から深刻へ)
35. Catch001
36. Catch002
37. Catch003
38. Catch004
39. CORD001
40. CORD002
41. CORD003
42. Senritsu no Kodomotachi (戦慄の子供たち) (TV Edit) ALI PROJECT
43. Transparent (TV Edit) KOKIA
