= Ali Project discography =

- Ali Project performs at their first North American concert in Seattle, Washington
- Studio albums: 24
- Extended plays: 1
- Soundtrack albums: 9
- Compilation albums: 12
- Singles: 21
- Video albums: 5
- Strings Albums: 8

Japanese recording duo Ali Project have released twenty-four studio albums, twelve compilation albums, one extended play, twenty-one singles, five video albums, nine soundtrack albums, and eight strings albums.

== Albums ==
=== Studio albums ===
| Year | Title | Album details | Chart position |
|---|---|---|---|
| 1988 | Gensou Teien ( 幻想庭園, Gensou Teien; "Fantastic Garden") | Released: January 25, 1988; Label: Polydor Records; Format: CD | N/A |
| 1992 | Gekka no Ichigun ( 月下の一群, Gekka no Ichigun; "Crowd Under the Moon") | Released: December 9, 1992; Label: EMI Music Japan; Format: CD | N/A |
| 1994 | Dali | Released: February 16, 1994; Label: EMI Music Japan; Format: CD | N/A |
| 1997 | Peony Pink | Released: May 21, 1997; Label: EMI Music Japan; Format: CD | N/A |
| 1998 | Noblerot | Released: November 21, 1998; Label: Columbia Music Entertainment; Format: CD | N/A |
| 2001 | Aristocracy | Released: April 25, 2001; Label: Tokuma Japan Communications; Format: CD | N/A |
| 2002 | Erotic & Heretic | Released: July 24, 2002; Label: Victor Entertainment; Format: CD | N/A |
| 2005 | Dilettante | Released: June 22, 2005; Label: Tokuma Japan Communications; Format: CD | 116 |
| 2007 | Psychedelic Insanity | Released: August 22, 2007; Label: Tokuma Japan Communications; Format: CD | 20 |
| 2008 | Kinsho ( 禁書, Kinsho; "Forbidden Literature") | Released: August 27, 2008; Label: Tokuma Japan Communications; Format: CD | 14 |
| 2009 | Poison | Released: August 26, 2009; Label: Tokuma Japan Communications; Format: CD | 18 |
| 2010 | Han Shinnihon Shugi ( 汎新日本主義, Han Shinnihon Shugi; "Pan-New Japan Doctrine") | Released: September 29, 2010; Label: Tokuma Japan Communications; Format: CD | 14 |
| 2012 | Gansakushi ( 贋作師, Gansakushi; "Counterfeiter") | Released: July 18, 2012; Label: Tokuma Japan Communications; Format: CD | 27 |
| 2013 | Reijou Bara Zukan ( 令嬢薔薇図鑑, Reijou Bara Zukan; "Young Lady's Rose Picture Book") | Released: September 11, 2013; Label: Tokuma Japan Communications; Format: CD | 22 |
| 2014 | Ryuukou Sekai ( 流行世界, Ryuukou Sekai; "Fashion World") | Released: August 27, 2014; Label: Tokuma Japan Communications; Format: CD | 23 |
| 2015 | Violetta Operetta | Released: January 21, 2015; Label: Tokuma Japan Communications; Format: CD | N/A |
| 2016 | A級戒厳令 | Released: August 24, 2016; Label: Tokuma Japan Communications; Format: CD | N/A |
| 2018 | Geijutsu Hentairon (芸術変態論; Theory of Art Transformation) | Released: July 25, 2018; Label: Tokuma Japan Communications; Format: CD | 34 |
| 2019 | Fantasia | Released: August 28, 2019; Label: Tokuma Japan Communications; Format: CD | 22 |
| 2020 | Jinsei Bimi Reisan (人生美味礼讃; Praise of Delicacy of Human Life) | Released: July 29, 2020; Label: Tokuma Japan Communications; Format: CD | 16 |
| 2021 | Belle Époque | Released: December 22, 2021; Label: Tokuma Japan Communications; Format: CD | 53 |
| 2023 | Tenki Seirou Naredomo Nami Takashi (天気晴朗ナレドモ波高シ; Weather Fine but Waves High) | Released: February 22, 2023; Label: Tokuma Japan Communications; Format: CD | 27 |
| 2024 | Jyakuhaimono (若輩者; Novice) | Released: June 25, 2024; Label: Tokuma Japan Communications; Format: CD | 30 |
| 2025 | Underground Insanity | Released: October 15, 2025; Label: Tokuma Japan Communications; Format: CD | 35 |

=== Compilation albums ===
| Year | Title | Album details | Chart position |
|---|---|---|---|
| 1995 | Hoshi to Tsuki no Sonata ( 星と月のソナタ, Hoshi to Tsuki no Sonata; "Sonata of the Moon and Stars") | Released: December 6, 1995; Label: EMI Music Japan; Format: CD | 112 |
| 2000 | Jamais Vu | Released: August 4, 2000; Label: ZAZOU Records; Format: CD | N/A |
| 2006 | Deja vu: The Original Best 1992-1995 | Released: July 26, 2006; Label: EMI Music Japan; Format: CD | N/A |
| 2006 | Collection Simple Plus | Released: July 26, 2006; Label: Victor Entertainment; Format: CD | 7 |
| 2007 | Soubi Kakei ( 薔薇架刑, Soubi Kakei; "Rose Crucifixion") | Released: April 4, 2007; Label: MellowHead; Format: CD | 5 |
| 2008 | Keikan Shijin Single Collection Plus ( 桂冠詩人, Keikan Shijin; "Poet Laureate") | Released: December 10, 2008; Label: Flying Dog; Format: CD | 8 |
| 2010 | La Vita Romantica ( ラ ヴィータ ロマンチカ, La Vita Romantica; "The Romantic Life") | Released: January 13, 2010; Label: MellowHead; Format: CD | 12 |
| 2011 | Queendom | Released: March 25, 2011; Label: MellowHead; Format: CD | 14 |

=== Video albums ===
| Year | Title | Album details |
|---|---|---|
| 2008 | Gekkou Soiree ( 月光ソワレ, Gekkou Soiree; "A Moonlight Party") | Released: March 26, 2008; Format: DVD |
| 2009 | Kinsho Hakkin Live at NHK Hall ( 禁書発禁, Kinsho Hakkin; "Banned Literature, Sales Prohibited") | Released: January 21, 2009; Format: DVD |
| 2010 | Tour '09 Poison: Doku wo Kurawaba Saramade ( 毒を食らわば皿まで, Doku wo Kurawaba Saramade; "In for a Penny, In for a Pound") | Released: January 20, 2010; Format: DVD |
| 2010 | Gekkou Soiree VI: Gothic Opera ( 月光ソワレ, Gekkou Soiree; "A Moonlight Party") | Released: July 14, 2010; Format: DVD |
| 2011 | Tour 2010 Han Shinnihon Shugi ( 汎新日本主義, Han Shinnihon Shugi; "Pan-New Japan Doctrine") | Released: February 9, 2011; Format: DVD |

=== Soundtrack albums ===
| Year | Title | Album details |
|---|---|---|
| 1996 | Birth of the Wizard: Eko Eko Azarak II | Released: August 1, 1996; Format: CD |
| 1997 | Music Tracks from Wish | Released: February 5, 1997; Format: CD |
| 1997 | Clamp Gakuen Tantei Dan Original Soundtrack 1 ( 学園探偵団, Gakuen Tantei Dan; "School Detectives") | Released: June 21, 1997; Format: CD |
| 1997 | Clamp Gakuen Tantei Dan Original Soundtrack 2 ( 学園探偵団, Gakuen Tantei Dan; "School Detectives") | Released: October 22, 1997; Format: CD |
| 1998 | Saint Luminous Jogakuin 2 Original Soundtrack ( 女学院, Jogakuin; "Girls High School") | Released: November 25, 1998; Format: CD |
| 2003 | Avenger Original Soundtrack | Released: December 3, 2003; Format: CD |
| 2006 | .hack//Roots Original Soundtrack | Released: June 28, 2006; Format: CD |
| 2006 | .hack//Roots Original Soundtrack 2 | Released: September 21, 2006; Format: CD |
| 2007 | Kaibutsu Ojo Original Soundtrack: Sympathy for the Belonephobia ( 怪物王女, Kaibutsu Ojo; "Monster Princess") | Released: October 3, 2007; Format: CD |

=== Strings albums ===
| Year | Title | Album details | Chart position |
|---|---|---|---|
| 2003 | Gekkou Shikoushou ( 月光嗜好症, Gekkou Shikoushou; "Moonbeam Intoxication") | Released: March 24, 2003; Label: Atmark Corporation; Format: CD | N/A |
| 2004 | Etoiles ( エトワール, Étoiles; "Stars") | Released: June 23, 2004; Label: Tokuma Japan Communications; Format: CD | N/A |
| 2005 | Kamigami no Tasogare ( 神々の黄昏, Kamigami no Tasogare; "Dusk of Gods") | Released: December 7, 2005; Label: Tokuma Japan Communications; Format: CD | N/A |
| 2006 | Romance | Released: June 12, 2006; Label: Tokuma Japan Communications; Format: CD | 39 |
| 2007 | Grand Finale | Released: December 12, 2007; Label: Tokuma Japan Communications; Format: CD | 34 |
| 2010 | Gothic Opera | Released: December 12, 2010; Label: Tokuma Japan Communications; Format: CD | 35 |
| 2011 | Les Papillons | Released: June 29, 2011; Label: Tokuma Japan Communications; Format: CD | 28 |

== Extended plays ==
| Year | Title | EP details |
|---|---|---|
| 2001 | Classics | Released: July 25, 2001; Label: Tokuma Japan Communications; Format: CD |

== Singles ==
| Year | Title | Chart position | Album | Theme song featured in |
|---|---|---|---|---|
| 2001 | "Coppelia no Hitsugi" ( コッペリアの柩, Coppelia no Hitsugi; "Coppelia's Casket") | 72 | Aristocracy | Noir |
| 2003 | "Gesshoku Grand Guignol" ( 月蝕グランギニョル, Gesshoku Grand Guignol; "Eclipse Grand Guignol") | 26 | Collection Simple Plus | Avenger |
| 2003 | "Pastel Pure" | 45 | Non-album single | Maria Watches Over Us |
| 2004 | "Kinjirareta Asobi" ( 禁じられた遊び, Kinjirareta Asobi; "A Forbidden Game") | 40 | Soubi Kakei | Rozen Maiden |
| 2005 | "Ashura-hime" ( 阿修羅姫, Ashura-hime; "Princess Asura") | 23 | Soubi Kakei | Mai-HiME: Unmei no Keitōju |
| 2005 | "Seishoujo Ryouiki" ( 聖少女領域, Seishoujo Ryouiki; "Domain of the Holy Girls") | 6 | Soubi Kakei | Rozen Maiden Träumend |
| 2006 | "Boukoku Kakusei Catharsis" ( 亡国覚醒カタルシス, Boukoku Kakusei Catharsis; "National Awakening Catharsis") | 9 | Keikan Shijin Single Collection Plus | .hack//Roots |
| 2006 | "Yuukyou Seishunka" ( 勇侠青春謳, Yuukyou Seishunka; "Chivalrous Youth Song") | 14 | Keikan Shijin Single Collection Plus | Code Geass - Lelouch of the Rebellion |
| 2006 | "Baragoku Otome" ( 薔薇獄乙女, Baragoku Otome; "Rose-Jail Maiden") | 11 | Soubi Kakei | Rozen Maiden Ouvertüre |
| 2007 | "Ankoku Tengoku" ( 暗黒天国, Ankoku Tengoku; "Dark Heaven") | 15 | La Vita Romantica | Kamichama Karin |
| 2007 | "Hizamazuite Ashi wo Oname" ( 跪いて足をお嘗め, Hizamazuite Ashi wo Oname; "Kneel Down and Lick My Feet") | 10 | La Vita Romantica | Princess Resurrection |
| 2008 | "Kotodama" ( コトダマ, Kotodama; "The Power of Words") | 15 | La Vita Romantica | Shigofumi: Letters from the Departed |
| 2008 | "Waga Routashi Aku no Hana" ( わが﨟たし悪の華, Waga Routashi Aku no Hana; "My Beautifully Elegant Flower of Evil") | 9 | Keikan Shijin Single Collection Plus | Code Geass - Lelouch of the Rebellion R2 |
| 2008 | "Kitei no Tsurugi" ( 鬼帝の剣, Kitei no Tsurugi; "Sword of the Demon Emperor") | 9 | Non-album single | Linebarrels of Iron |
| 2009 | "Rara Eve Shinseiki" ( 裸々イヴ新世紀, Rara Eve Shinseiki; "A Naked Eve of the New Century") | 9 | La Vita Romantica | The Girl Who Leapt Through Space |
| 2009 | "Jigoku no Mon" ( 地獄の門, Jigoku no Mon; "The Gates of Hell") | 16 | La Vita Romantica | Phantom ~Requiem for the Phantom~ |
| 2009 | "Senritsu no Kodomotachi" ( 戦慄の子供たち, Senritsu no Kodomotachi; "Children of Fear") | 23 | La Vita Romantica | Phantom: Requiem for the Phantom |
| 2009 | "Datengoku Sensen" ( 堕天國宣戦, Datengoku Sensen; "A Declaration of War Against Fallen Heaven") | 19 | Queendom | The Book of Bantorra |
| 2010 | "Ranse Eroica" ( 亂世エロイカ, Ranse Eroica; "Heroic Troubled Times") | 20 | Queendom | Fate/Extra |
| 2010 | "Katana to Saya" ( 刀と鞘, Katana to Saya; "Sword and Scabbard") | 27 | Queendom | Katanagatari |
| 2012 | "Kyoumu Densen" ( 凶夢伝染, Kyoumu Densen; "Nightmare Contagion") | 16 | Non-album single | Another |
| 2013 | "Watashi no Bara wo Kaminasai" ( 私の薔薇を喰みなさい, Watashi no Bara wo Kaminasai; "Eat my roses") | 20 | Non-album single | Rozen Maiden – Zurückspulen |
| 2015 | "Haramitsu Renge" ( 波羅蜜恋華, Haramitsu Renge; "Paaramitaa Lotus Flower") | | Non-album single | Chivalry of a Failed Knight |
| 2021 | "Hi no Tsuki" ( 緋ノ月, Hi no Tsuki; "Scarlet Moon") | | Non-album single | Irina: The Vampire Cosmonaut |
