= List of Shigofumi episodes =

The cover of the Japanese edition of the first DVD compilation.

This is a list of episodes from the Japanese animated television series Shigofumi: Letters from the Departed. The episodes are directed by Tatsuo Satō and written by Ichirō Ōkouchi, features original character designs by Kouhaku Kuroboshi and assistant direction by Katsushi Sakurabi. The series is animated by the Japanese animation studio J.C.Staff, and produced by Bandai Visual and Genco; sound production was headed by Rakuonsha. The episodes are based on the original concept by Tomorō Yuzawa, and adapt the concept over twelve episodes. The plot of the anime follows Fumika, a mail carrier from the afterlife realm of Shigo who delivers shigofumi — letters written by people who have recently died — to people in a city in Japan.

The anime started airing on January 6, 2008, on the Chiba TV Japanese television network, with episodes airing later on numerous other UHF stations and BS11. The televised broadcast of episodes three and eight, "Friends" and "Beginning" respectively, were "altered in light of recent circumstances in the society at large," as reported on the anime's official website. Sun TV also ceased broadcast of Shigofumi episode six, and resumed broadcasting with episode seven. Other recent 2007 anime series which were changed due to current events in Japan include School Days, Higurashi no Naku Koro ni Kai, and Kodomo no Jikan.

The episodes were released in six DVD compilations in Japan by Bandai Visual between March 25 and August 22, 2008, presented on a 16:9 anamorphic frame rate, and feature two episodes each along with numerous extras, including audio commentary, liner notes, picture dramas, and Shigofumi letter sets. An original video animation episode was released as a DVD on September 26, 2008. The anime has been licensed by Bandai Visual for English language localization, and the first DVD release was originally scheduled for May 13, 2008, but was placed on hold as Bandai Visual reconsidered their release plans. The series was later released by Sentai Filmworks on August 17, 2010, in North America.

Two pieces of theme music are used for the anime; one opening theme and one ending theme. The opening theme is "Kotodama" (コトダマ; "Power of Language") performed by Ali Project, and the single was released on January 23, 2008. The ending theme, written by Saori Kodama with composition and arrangement by Pe-jun, is "Chain" performed by Snow*, and was released on February 6, 2008. The anime's original soundtrack was released on March 26, 2008; each of the albums are released by Lantis.

== Episodes ==
No.	Title	Original release date
1	"Confession"; Transliteration: "Kokuhaku" (Japanese: コクハク)	January 6, 2008
Shōta Machiya, a high school student with an interest in building rockets, is friends with Asuna Ayase whose father was recently killed. Fumika, along with her talking staff, Kanaka, comes to deliver a letter to Shōta which was written by Asuna's father after he died. The letter is addressed to "Ayase's lover", so for the time being Shōta cannot accept the letter until he starts going out with Asuna; in the meantime, Fumika waits for him to confess his love to Asuna. One day close to the launch of his new rocket, Kanaka accidentally leaves the letter behind where Shōta reads it to discover that Asuna killed her own father. Shōta does not believe what he reads and instead seeks out Asuna, only for her to stab him after Fumika appears.
2	"Rocket"; Transliteration: "Roketto" (Japanese: ロケット)	January 13, 2008
Asuna and her younger sister, Miku, move into an orphanage while the police search for the missing Shōta. It is revealed that Asuna was sexually exploited by her father. She killed him when he revealed his intentions of exploiting Miku as well. When Shōta's body is found, Asuna decides to cut her hair and flee the city, reluctantly leaving Miku behind. However, before she can leave, Fumika delivers a letter to her from Shōta. After reading it, she decides to launch Shōta's rocket. Meanwhile, the police have identified Asuna as a suspect in Shōta's murder. Just as the rocket is about to launch, the police confront her on the rooftop. The wind blows a tarp over the rocket, and Asuna rushes forward to cut the tarp away so the rocket can launch. The police misinterpret her intentions and fatally shoot her. The episode ends with Fumika delivering a letter to Miku.
3	"Friends"; Transliteration: "Tomodachi" (Japanese: トモダチ)	January 20, 2008
Three friends, Sen, Kotake and Nojima, discuss jumping off the platform in front of a train — but not dying. Sen, a guy who just smiles and is cheerful, later kills himself by jumping off his apartment building. His father is desperate to know to how he died, so he takes the students in Sen's class hostage. Fumika shows up and delivers a letter from Sen to Kotake; the letter reveals that Sen jumped because he was in the mood for it. Nojima believes that Fumika is Fumika Mikawa, a girl he knew from junior high who shot her own father, and runs to the rooftop to confront her.
4	"Tears"; Transliteration: "Namida" (Japanese: ナミダ)	January 27, 2008
Fumika attempts to deliver a thick letter to a high school tennis player, Ran, whose mother who walked out on her as a child to live with another man. However, Ran has hated her mother ever since and does not accept the letter. Fumika follows Ran to her tennis club's training camp and is persistent in delivering the letter to her; Ran finally accepts it, but refuses to read it. Ran injures her ankle while running and has to stay inside the dorm for the rest of the day, but a fire breaks out, nearly killing her. Afterwards, Ran reads the letter and discovers that despite leaving her behind, her mother, who taught her how to play tennis, actually went to all of her tennis matches.
5	"I'm Home"; Transliteration: "Tadaima" (Japanese: タダイマ)	February 3, 2008
Fumika is assigned to deliver a letter to a cat, however she runs into Chiaki, another shigofumi mail carrier, who is also trying to deliver a letter to the cat. However, Chiaki's attempt to catch the cat scares it away. Fumika and Chiaki realize that they have the same task from an elderly couple who owned the cat. They first attempt to lure the cat using catnip. When that partially succeeds, it turns into a chase. During the chase, Fumika notices Fumika Mikawa's body inside a hospital as she passes the window. Upon catching up to Chiaki, they reach the building where the cat lives. It turns out the letters contained keys to open the door to the apartment where the cat's owners lived.
6	"Shout"; Transliteration: "Sakebi" (Japanese: サケビ)	February 10, 2008
Kōichi Kikukawa is being bullied in class and via an Internet message board. One of his classmates named Shunsuke Morishita realizes that the person on the message board is actually Kōichi himself. Before long, Kōichi kills himself, and Shunsuke takes up Kōichi's previous role as the bullied. Shunsuke finally realizes what Kōichi had been going through and is finding it very difficult to go on living. One night while being bullied after school, Fumika shows up and delivers a letter from Kōichi to Shunsuke; in the letter, Kōichi tells Shunsuke that he wants him to suffer since he bullied him too along with the three other guys. After Fumika leaves, the other three guys go back to bullying Shunsuke, and in a moment of desperation, Shunsuke stabs one of them with a nearby screwdriver.
7	"Sparkle"; Transliteration: "Kirameki" (Japanese: キラメキ)	February 17, 2008
Haruna Kasai, a woman who has been working in an editing firm for three years, is given the chance to become Kirameki Mikawa's new editor for his poetry, which thrills her since she is a big fan of his work. When Haruna goes to meet with Kirameki at his artistically architectural home, she finds him to be rather strange. Meanwhile, Kaname meets with Natsuka to learn more about Fumika Mikawa, and the two follow a map to Kirameki's house. Fumika arrives at Kirameki's home and gives him a letter from a now-dead fan. She pulls out her gun in order to help him remember the past, but Kaname interferes, causing Fumika to drop the gun. Kirameki picks it up and shoots Fumika.
8	"Beginning"; Transliteration: "Hajimari" (Japanese: ハジマリ)	February 24, 2008
After Kirameki shoots Fumika, Kaname beats him up and locks him in a room. During this time, Fumika heals herself, even removing the blood stains from her clothes. Fumika then proceeds to tell the others that she is in fact a second personality of Kirameki's daughter named Mika who was created due to Kirameki's mistreatment of his daughter. Kirameki uses gunpowder from bullets to break out of the room and Fumika goes after him with the intent to finally kill him. She nearly does so, but is stopped by Haruna.
9	"Reunion"; Transliteration: "Saikai" (Japanese: サイカイ)	March 2, 2008
After Fumika, Kaname, and Natsuka go visit Fumika Kirameki in the hospital, Chiaki comes by and asks Fumika if she would like to go to an island in the south for a vacation. Much to Kanaka's surprise, Fumika agrees, though does not really know what to do since she has never been on a vacation before. Fumika and the others meet a girl at the inn they are staying at who is going to a nearby island to visit her grandfather's grave. It turns out that her grandfather was the man whom Chiaki had been in love with right up to her death in a car accident fifty years previously. Chiaki and Fumika also go to visit the grave, and Chiaki finds a stone-engraved shigofumi addressed to her from her former lover asking her to marry him.
10	"Meeting"; Transliteration: "Deai" (Japanese: デアイ)	March 8, 2008
Takehiko Hibiya is a thirty-two-year-old man who recently quit his job as a graphic designer for a video game company because he felt he was not creating what he wanted to create. He is told by his doctor that he has an incurable cancer of the appendix. Takehiko takes a relative's young daughter named Fumika out to the movies in a neighboring city and gets into trouble with the police who suspect that he abducted Fumika. After he is released, he is driving home with Fumika when the car breaks down. Takehiko leaves to try to get help, but Fumika comes running after him saying that she does not want to be left alone. Suddenly, a truck comes their way, and Takehiko pushes Fumika to safety and he dies when the truck hits him.
11	"Awakening"; Transliteration: "Mezame" (Japanese: メザメ)	March 15, 2008
Fumika wakes from her coma and is greeted warmly by Kaname and Natsuka. Chiaki learns that should Fumika awaken, Fumika, the mail carrier, will deliver the gun to her other self and ask to be shot, effectively "killing" her. Fumika's friends try to avoid this by bringing Fumika to their home, and telling Fumika, the mail carrier, that her other self was transferred to another hospital. The next day, Fumika remembers how she shot her father, and runs out of the house in search of her other self. When the two finally meet for the first time in three years, Fumika hands her counterpart the gun, and she shoots her. Fumika later goes to the police and accuses her father of child abuse.
12	"After-Death Letters"; Transliteration: "Shigofumi" (Japanese: シゴフミ)	March 22, 2008
After implicating her father, Fumika becomes a celebrity at school and on the Internet; people constantly bother her and try to take pictures of her which pains her greatly. With Fumika, the mail carrier, now gone, Fumika and her friends try to go on with their lives, but find it hard to go on without Fumika. Kirameki's former wife, and Fumika's mother meets her daughter, but tells her that she does not want to be a mother, and leaves her daughter. Following this, Fumika goes to Kirameki's odd house where she is about to kill herself when her counterpart appears and stops her. An argument starts between them, and Fumika, the mail carrier, hits her counterpart a few times. Kirameki's daughter tells her other self that she too wanted to live a normal life, and that she did not really want to disappear. Kaname, Natsuka (with Kanaka), and Chiaki (with Matoma) arrive at Kirameki's home to find Fumika and her other self crying together on the ground. Fumika goes back to being a shigofumi deliverer, and the other Fumika goes back to living on her own as a high school student.
OVA	"Thereafter"; Transliteration: "Sorekara" (Japanese: ソレカラ)	September 26, 2008
Fumika is being bullied at school, but a girl named Suzune shows her kindness. At school, a rumor is spreading about the curse of Kōichi Kikukawa, and people are apparently receiving shigofumi from him, though Kaname and Natsuka suspect that they are fakes. Suzune turns out to be Kōichi's younger sister, and she is attempting to enact revenge against the three guys who pushed her brother to suicide, but Fumika (Kirameki's daughter) interferes before she can. Later at school, Suzune continues her friendship with Fumika, and Natsuka's older sister, Haruna, sends Fumika a text message asking her to come live with them instead of at a hotel.
