= Collection Simple Plus =

Album by Ali Project

COLLECTION SIMPLE PLUS

Compilation album by ALI PROJECT
- Released: July 26, 2006
- Length: 52:29 (limited edition); 57:09 (regular edition)
- Label: Victor Entertainment
- Producer: Yoshimoto Ishikawa

ALI PROJECT chronology
Déjà vu ~The Original Best 1992-1995~ (2006)	COLLECTION SIMPLE PLUS (2006)	Romance (2006)

Collection Simple Plus is a compilation CD album by Ali Project that compiles songs from the singles they had previously released under Victor Entertainment. There are two versions. A limited-edition version (catalog number: VIZL-198) has 12 tracks and a bonus DVD, containing the promo video for "Bōkoku Kakusei Catharsis" and a video clip of them performing "Gesshoku Grand Guignol" live. The regular edition (catalog number: VICL-61999) has a thirteenth track, an orchestrated version of "Bōkoku Kakusei Catharsis". A majority of the songs are anime tie-ups. This album peaked at No. 7 on the Oricon charts and sold 45,616 copies in total.

== Track listing ==
=== CD ===
All lyrics are written by Arika Takarano; all music is composed by Mikiya Katakura.

No.	Title	Length
1.	"Wish"	4:28
2.	"Yume no Ato ni après un rêve (夢のあとに après un rêve)"	4:53
3.	"Peony Pink (ピアニィ・ピンク)"	3:42
4.	"Tsukiyo no Pierrette (月夜のピエレット)"	4:10
5.	"Anniversary of Angel"	4:32
6.	"Tenshi ni Yosu (天使に寄す)"	3:53
7.	"Coppelia no Hitsugi (コッペリアの柩)"	3:59
8.	"Après le noir"	4:50
9.	"Aka to Kuro (赤と黒)" (original version)	4:50
10.	"Gesshoku Grand Guignol (月蝕グランギニョル)"	4:20
11.	"Mirai no Eve (未來のイヴ)"	4:33
12.	"Jigoku no Kisetsu (地獄の季節)"	5:02
13.	"Bōkoku Kakusei Catharsis (亡國覚醒カタルシス)" (orchestral crowd version)	4:34

=== DVD ===
#	Track name
01	Bōkoku Kakusei Catharsis [music clip] (亡國覚醒カタルシス [music clip])
02	Gesshoku Grand Guignol [live] (月蝕グランギニョル [live])
