= The Kingdom =

The Kingdom may refer to:

== Literature ==
- The Kingdom (Cussler and Blackwood novel), a 2011 novel by Clive Cussler and Grant Blackwood
- The Kingdom (Carrère novel), a 2014 book by Emmanuel Carrère
- The Kingdom, history of Saudi Arabia by Robert Lacey
- The Kingdom (Nesbø novel), a 2020 novel by Jo Nesbø
- The Kingdom Series, a series of six Christian allegorical novels

== Music ==
- The Kingdom (Starfield album), a 2012 album by Starfield
- The Kingdom (Bush album), a 2020 album by British rock band Bush
- The Kingdom (Elgar), an oratorio by Edward Elgar composed in 1906

== Other arts ==
- The Kingdom (miniseries), a Danish television miniseries by Lars von Trier
- The Kingdom (comics), a DC Comics story and comic book limited series
- The Kingdom (2007 film), an action thriller film set in Saudi Arabia
- The Kingdom (2024 French film), a French family crime drama film
- The Kingdom (2024 Philippine film), a Philippine action-adventure alternate history film
- The Kingdom, a settlement in The Walking Dead

== Other uses ==
- The Kingdom, a nickname for County Kerry in Ireland
- The Kingdom (professional wrestling), a pro wrestling tag team and stable
- The Kingdom, an apocalyptic Christian movement founded by Frank Sandford

== See also ==
- King (disambiguation)
- Kingdom (disambiguation)
- Kingdom Come (disambiguation)
