= Rara Eve Shinseiki =

Single by Ali Project
- B-side: "Kishi Otome"
- Released: January 21, 2009
- Recorded: 2008
- Genre: J-Pop
- Length: 17:17
- Label: Mellow Head

Ali Project singles chronology
"Kitei no Tsurugi" (2008)	"Rara Eve Shinseiki" (2009)	"Jigoku no Mon" (2009)

"Rara Eve Shinseiki" (裸々イヴ新世紀, Rara Ivu Shinseiki; "Naked Eve of the New Century") is Ali Project's 23rd single. This single was released on January 21, 2009, under the Mellow Head and Geneon label.

The single title was used as the opening theme for the anime series Sora Kake Girl.

This single's catalog number is LHCM-1048.

== Track listing ==
#	Track name	Romaji
01	裸々イヴ新世紀	Rara Eve Shinseiki
02	騎士乙女	Kishi Otome
03	裸々イヴ新世紀 -Instrumental-	Rara Eve Shinseiki -Instrumental-
04	騎士乙女 -Instrumental-	Kishi Otome -Instrumental-

== Charts and sales ==
Oricon Ranking (Weekly)	Sales	Charting Week
9	15,721	9 weeks
