= Waga Rōtashi Aku no Hana =

Single by Ali Project
- B-side: "Aragawa"
- Released: July 30, 2008
- Recorded: 2008
- Genre: J-Pop
- Label: Victor Entertainment

Ali Project singles chronology
"Kotodama" (2008)	"Waga Rōtashi Aku no Hana" (2008)	"Kitei no Tsurugi" (2008)

"Waga Rōtashi Aku no Hana" (わが﨟たし悪の華; "My Beautifully Elegant Flower of Evil") is the 21st single of the J-pop group Ali Project.

== Release ==
This single was released on July 30, 2008, under the Victor Entertainment label.

== Anime Tie-In ==
The single title was used as the second ending theme for Code Geass – Lelouch of the Rebellion R2 which marked their second tie-in with the said anime series after Yūkyō Seishunka.

== Track listing ==
Track Listing
#	Track name	Romaji
01	わが﨟たし悪の華	Waga Rōtashi Aku no Hana
02	麤皮	Aragawa
03	わが﨟たし悪の華 -Instrumental-	Waga Rōtashi Aku no Hana -Instrumental-
04	麤皮 -Instrumental-	Aragawa -Instrumental-

== Charts and sales ==
Oricon Ranking
Oricon Ranking (Weekly)	Sales	Charting Week
9	34,418	12 weeks
