= Golf Digest =

American golf magazine

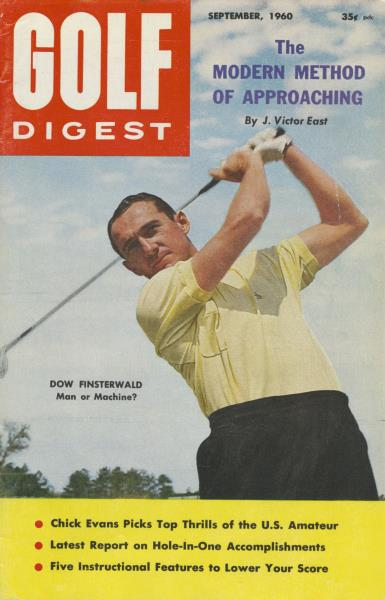
- Issue cover dated September 1960, featuring Dow Finsterwald
- Editor-in-Chief: Jerry Tarde
- Frequency: Monthly
- Total circulation: 1,652,356 (2024)
- Founded: 1950
- Company: TNT Sports (Skydance)
- Country: United States
- Based in: New York City
- Language: English
- Website: golfdigest.com
- ISSN: 0017-176X

Golf Digest is a monthly golf magazine published by Skydance through its TNT Sports unit. It is a generalist golf publication covering recreational golf and men's and women's competitive golf. The magazine was co-founded by William H. Davis, Howard Gill, and John F. Barnett in Chicago in 1950, moved to Connecticut in 1964 and was sold to the New York Times Company in 1969. The Times company sold their magazine division to Condé Nast in 2001. The headquarters of Golf Digest is in New York City, relocated from Connecticut. On May 13, 2019, Discovery, Inc. acquired Golf Digest from Condé Nast to integrate with GolfTV.

== Course rankings ==
Golf Digest produces a biennial ranking of the world's best golf courses.

Since 1965, Golf Digest has produced biennial rankings of "America's 100 Greatest Golf Courses". The courses are voted on by a panel of several hundred golf experts. The magazine also produces lists of the best new courses, the best golf resorts, the best courses in each U.S. state and best American golf courses for women. Before the "Greatest" rankings were introduced in 1985, Golf Digest produced lists called at different times America's 100 Most Testing Courses and America's 100 Greatest Tests of Golf. Alongside the "100 Greatest Courses" ranking, and using the same methodology, Golf Digest publishes a list of "America's 100 Greatest Public Golf Courses". In this context, "public" means a golf course that is open to play by the public, as opposed to a private club—not necessarily a course operated by a governmental entity. In addition to its national rankings, Golf Digest also ranks courses at a state level.

The magazine also compiles a list of the leading courses outside the United States. This is created using information from national golf associations, plus votes by the same panelists supplemented by some additional ones with international knowledge.

In 2010, Golf Digest produced its inaugural ranking of "America's Top 50 Courses for Women". In creating the ranking, the magazine used nominations and evaluations by its panel of over 100 female raters as well as the woman-friendly criteria established by the editors. Those criteria included: at least one tee less than 5,300 yards; at least two sets of tees with USGA slope and course ratings for women; run-up areas to most or all greens and minimal forced carries for those playing from the forward tees.

== Recognition ==
In 2009, Golf Digest was nominated for a National Magazine Awards by the American Society of Magazine Editors in the Magazine Section in recognition of the excellence of a regular section of a magazine based on voice, originality and unified presentation.

== Female representation ==
In April 2014, Golf Digest was widely criticized when, after neglecting to picture a female golfer on their cover for six years, they chose to picture model Paulina Gretzky in a revealing outfit as their May 2014 cover. The move was "particularly frustrating" to LPGA golfers. LPGA Tour Commissioner Mike Whan issued a statement echoing the concerns expressed by LPGA players. In the October 2014 edition, U.S. Women's Open winner Michelle Wie appeared on the cover.

In May 2016, the magazine again featured a female celebrity in the cover, Paige Spiranac (who was, at the time, a professional golfer), which was criticized by veteran golfer Juli Inkster.

== See also ==
- Kingdom magazine
