= Senritsu no Kodomotachi =

Single by Ali Project
- B-side: "Hell's Maria"
- Released: August 19, 2009
- Recorded: 2009
- Genre: Neoclassical
- Length: 18:59
- Label: Glory Heaven

Ali Project singles chronology
"Jigoku no Mon" (2009)	"Senritsu no Kodomotachi" (2009)	"Datengoku Sensen" (2009)

"Senritsu no Kodomotachi" (戦慄の子供たち; "Children of Fear") is Ali Project's 25th single. This single was released on August 19, 2009, under Glory Heaven, a sublabel of Lantis, an anime music company. The single's catalog number is LASM-4020.

The single title was used as the second opening theme for the anime series Phantom ~Requiem for the Phantom~.

== Track listing ==
#	Track name	Romaji
01	戦慄の子供たち	Senritsu no Kodomotachi
02	Hell's Maria	
03	戦慄の子供たち -Instrumental-	Senritsu no Kodomotachi -Instrumental-
04	Hell's Maria -Instrumental-	

== Charts and sales ==
Oricon Ranking (Weekly)	Sales	Time in Chart
23	7,591	4 weeks
