= Super Robot Wars UX =

2013 video game

- Official Boxart
- Developer: Banpresto
- Publisher: Namco Bandai Games
- Producer: Ayumi Uta
- Artists: Character; Chiyoko; Mecha; Atsushi Tsuyuki
- Series: Super Robot Wars
- Platform: Nintendo 3DS
- Release: JP: March 14, 2013
- Genre: Tactical role-playing
- Mode: Single player

Super Robot Wars UX (スーパーロボット大戦UX, Sūpā Robotto Taisen Yū Ekkusu) is a tactical role-playing game for the Nintendo 3DS developed by Banpresto and published by Namco Bandai Games. It is the first Super Robot Wars (SRW) game for the 3DS and was released in Japan on March 14, 2013. The theme of this game is "Possibilities".

== Gameplay ==
Gameplay of Super Robot Wars UX inherits the same gameplay from Super Robot Wars L on being a tactical RPG using animated sprites. Controls in the game depends on the use of the stylus, directional buttons and the Circle Pad, with the 3D feature used to zoom in and out of some maps. When a stage begins, the character receives introductory dialogue between playable characters, leading to the scenario on the battle field. To complete a scenario, the player must accomplish scenario objectives. Some scenarios are longer, with multi-part missions or have new objectives added as the story unfolds. On battle field, the player and enemy take turns to order their units with commands available, such as movement, attacking, forming squads and casting "Spirit Commands", a set of magic-like spells unique to each pilot. Once the scenario is cleared, more dialogue is exchanged between characters before the player is taken to an intermission menu. Here, units can be upgraded or optional parts installed, characters' stats and skills can be changed or upgraded, and other maintenance actions can be performed before the player continues on with the game.

Aside from the usual features, UX also features dynamic animated cutscenes in each scenario and attacks and a Partner Unit System, similar to the Twin Battle System of Super Robot Wars: Original Generations. Units can be deployed in a team of two units or a single unit depending on the situation. It also feature Skill Parts, which can be used to update and strengthen each unit. The game also has purchasable downloadable content, the first in the series. Players can buy and download mission maps and campaigns through the Nintendo eShop.

Robots are paired up to 2 units squads in battle, each will be able to choose its attack target. Mastery is removed from this game, so player will not have to rush through every stage.

== Characters ==
Agnes Berge
Voiced by: Chihiro Suzuki

A 19-year-old lieutenant ranked pilot belonging to the EFF forces in North America. Raised with his parents, Agnes grew up in the facility and treats them all as his family. He's a serious and gentle character but shows his strength and determination when the lives of others are in danger. Agnes also values the lives of others more than anything and will do everything he can to protect those around him, even if it means standing up against much stronger foes. He pilots the Liott B, a customized unit used in close combat. His nickname is Arnie.

Saya Krueger
Voiced by: Ai Kobayashi

Saya is an 18-year-old mercenary working with the organization called Unknown Strikers. she's a pro among pros that never lets her emotions interfere with any given mission, often sent on undercover missions but her weakness is not being able to express non-combat related feelings. She pilots the support fighter Lyrath, which is equipped with the Repton Vector Engine.

Richard Krueger
Voiced by: Jūrōta Kosugi

Saya's father and also a member of the Unknown Strikers Mercenary group. Considered as a patriot in the battlefield, Richard does countless unrecognized jobs for his country that cannot be seen by the public. He considers himself to be good-for-nothing and can be rather hard on himself, one such example is how he would accept a meal only after completing a mission which he considers worthy. He pilots the mysterious unit Orphes, a close combat unit equipped with the Repton Vector Engine.

Jin Spencer
Voiced by: Masaya Matsukaze

Agnes's childhood friend who is also in the military. He eventually becomes Agnes's rival.

Noval Dilan
Voiced by: Yukana

Is the scientist who developed Earth Federation's Riot series.

== Series appearances ==
The game features robots from sixteen different media franchise entries. Eight media franchises are appearing for the first time in Super Robot Wars:

- Linebarrels of Iron (Manga)
- Kishin Houkou Demonbane (Debut)
- Fafner in the Azure
- Fafner in the Azure: Heaven and Earth (Debut)
- The Wings of Rean (Debut)
- Ninja Senshi Tobikage
- Virtual On featuring Fei-Yen HD (Debut)
- Mobile Suit Gundam SEED Destiny (After Story)
- Mobile Suit Gundam 00 the Movie: A Wakening of the Trailblazer (Debut)
- SD Gundam Sangokuden Brave Battle Warriors (Debut)
- Heroman (Debut)
- Mazinkaizer SKL (Debut)
- Macross Frontier The Movie: The False Songstress
- Macross Frontier The Movie: The Wings of Goodbye
- Jūsō Kikō Dancouga Nova (After Story)
- Aura Battler Dunbine (After Story)

== Development ==
The game was first revealed in December 2012 by the Japanese magazine Famitsu with a release date set for March 14, 2013. The game is being developed for the Nintendo 3DS, making it for the first game in the Super Robot Wars series to be released on the platform. Robots from eight new media franchise titles will be making their first appearances of the series in this game and a total of 16 titles are being used to supply the game with robots. A trailer for the game revealed the Fei-Yen HD, a variant of the Fei-Yen piloted by Hatsune Miku which first appeared in the PlayStation Portable game Hatsune Miku: Project DIVA, making this the first vocaloid to appear in a SRW game. The Fei-Yen HD can wield Miku's signature leek and perform her signature dance moves. The producer of Virtual-On, Juro Wataru supervises the storyline for Fei-Yen HD. Eiichi Shimizu and Tomohiro Shimoguchi officially stated on their blog that the storyline of Linebarrels of Iron will be based on the manga as opposed to the Anime. The game will feature voiced battle scenes and animated cutscenes.

A bundle with the Nintendo 3DS XL system is planned, and will include a special edition of the handheld with a "simple but neat design": one side has a world map and the other side has a map of space. The first batch of games produced will include a code which allows buyers to access extra downloadable content only available to early buyers. The code grants access to special campaign maps and a Tsume Suparobo (ツメスパロボ) chess-like puzzle minigame. The developer also plans to release additional downloadable campaign maps.

On December 13, 2012, the first trailer of the game was published, while the second trailer was released on February 15, 2013.
