= Kitei no Tsurugi =

Single by Ali Project
- B-side: "Nakigara no Onna"
- Released: November 19, 2008
- Recorded: 2008
- Genre: J-Pop
- Label: Victor Entertainment

Ali Project singles chronology
"Waga Rōtashi Aku no Hana" (2008)	"Kitei no Tsurugi" (2008)	"Rara Eve Shinseiki" (2009)

"Kitei no Tsurugi" (鬼帝の剣; "the Sword of the Demon Emperor") is Ali Project's 22nd single. This single was released on November 19, 2008, under the Victor Entertainment label.

The single title was used as the opening theme for the anime series Linebarrels of Iron. This single garnered the #9 spot in the Oricon weekly charts and charted for 9 weeks.

This single's catalog number is VTCL-35050.

== Track listing ==
#	Track name	Romaji
01	鬼帝の剣	Kitei no Tsurugi
02	亡骸の女	Nakigara no Onna
03	鬼帝の剣 -Instrumental-	Kitei no Tsurugi -Instrumental-
04	亡骸の女 -Instrumental-	Nakigara no Onna -Instrumental-

== Charts and sales ==
Oricon Ranking (Weekly)	Sales	Charting Week
9	20,823	9 weeks
