= Covenant Worship =

American Christian music worship band

- Origin: Dallas, Texas
- Genres: Worship, CCM
- Years active: 2009–present
- Labels: Integrity
- Members: Nikki Chenoweth-Moltz; Holly McWilliams; Josh Barnett; Mary Barnett; Javi Hernandez; Monique Vasquez
- Past members: David Binion; Nicole Binion; Gracie Binion; Joshua Dufrene; Colin Edge; Joel Carpenter; Nathan Walker
- Website: covenantchurch.org

Covenant Worship is an American Christian music worship band from Dallas. The group formed at Covenant Church, an interdenominational congregation, while the church was established by pastors Mike and Kathy Hayes in 1976. The group released, Heaven on Earth in 2009 and Never Going Back in 2010 independently. They have released 4 live albums, Standing in 2012, Kingdom in 2014, Take Heart in 2016 and Sand and Stars in 2017. In May 2017, after the release of Sand and Stars, worship pastors David and Nicole Binion (with daughter Madison "Gracie" Binion or MDSN) felt God was telling them that their time with Covenant Church was coming to an end. Since then Covenant Worship has released 2 live albums, 1 studio albums (with Covenant Church youth worship group Cov Kid), and 1 instrumental album.

== Background ==
Covenant Worship is from Dallas, where they began in 2009 with four members, David Binion, Nicole Binion, Joshua Dufrene, and Colin Edge, while they were members of Covenant Church, an interdenominational congregation, founded by pastors Mike and Kathy Hayes, in 1976.

== Music history ==
The band started as a musical entity in 2009, with their first independently-made album, Heaven on Earth and it was released on October 27, 2009, from Covenant Worship. The album was their breakthrough release on the Billboard chart, where it peaked at No. 29 on the Gospel Albums chart. Their next album, a studio album, Standing, was released on August 7, 2012, by Integrity Music. The album charted on three Billboard magazine charts, reaching No. 138 on The Billboard 200, No. 2 on Christian Albums, and No. 19 on the Independent Albums chart. They released, Kingdom, on July 1, 2014, with Integrity Media. That album was No. 113 on The Billboard 200, and No. 2 on the Christian Albums chart. They released, Take Heart, on February 26, 2016, with Integrity Music.

== Members ==
Current members

- Joshua Jachin Dufrene (August 13, 1986)
- Colin Geoffrey Edge (January 4, 1990)
- Nathan Walker
- Holly McWilliams

Former Members

- David Lee Binion (November 7, 1962)
- Nicole Denise Binion (April 18, 1975, née, Power)
- Madison Grace Binion

== Discography ==
Live albums

Title	Album details	Peak chart positions	
Title	Album details	US	US CHR
Standing	Released: August 7, 2012; Label: Integrity; CD, digital download	138	2
Kingdom	Released: July 1, 2014; Label: Integrity; CD, digital download	113	2
Take Heart	Released: February 26, 2016; Label: Integrity; CD, digital download	–	9
Sand and Stars	Released: April 14, 2017; Label: Integrity; CD, digital download	88	-
