= Queendom =

Queendom usually refers to a matriarchal state, but may also refer to:

== Music ==
- Queendom (Awich album) or the title song, 2022
- Queendom (Show-Ya album), 1986
- Queendom (EP), by Red Velvet, 2021
  - "Queendom" (Red Velvet song), the title song
- Queendom, an album by Ali Project, 2011
- Queendom, an album by Pushim, 2004
- "Queendom" (Aurora song), 2018
- "Queendom", a song by RuPaul from Mamaru, 2022

== Television and film ==
- Queendom (TV series), a 2019 South Korean reality competition series
- Queendom (film), a 2023 documentary about Russian drag performance artist Gena Marvin

== See also ==
- Eastern Queendom
- Lobedu queendom, headed by the 'Rain Queen'/Modjadji
