= Kingdom (Covenant Worship album) =

Live album by Covenant Worship
- Released: July 1, 2014
- Genre: Worship, CCM
- Length: 75:48
- Label: Integrity
- Producer: Israel Houghton

Kingdom is the third live album from Covenant Worship. Integrity Music released the album on July 1, 2014. They worked with Israel Houghton, in the production of this album.

== Critical reception ==
Professional ratings
Review scores
Source	Rating
365 Days of Inspiring Media	3.5/5 stars
AllMusic	3.5/5 stars
Christian Music Review	2.5/5 stars
Louder Than the Music	4/5 stars
New Release Today	3/5 stars 3.5/5 stars
Worship Leader	5/5 stars

Awarding the album three and a half stars at AllMusic, Matt Collar writes, "Kingdom, showcases the group's exuberant praise & worship sound." Mark Ryan, rating the album three stars for New Release Today, says, "The other highlight of the album is that it was recorded live, just as all worship albums should be." Giving the album three and a half stars by New Release Today, Marcus Hathcock states, "Kingdom does a good job of capturing a live church atmosphere." Jeremy Armstrong, indicating in a five star review from Worship Leader, describes, "Kingdom is powerful, infectious, and musically incredible." Specifying in a three and a half star review for 365 Days of Inspiring Media, Joshua Andre replies, "Though this album can be improve[d] upon...this is a solid effort."

Jono Davies, signaling in a four star review at Louder Than the Music, responds, "this album has a great mix of musical styles, and they all work wonderfully together." Criticizing the release in a two and a half star review from Christian Music Review, April Covington cautions, "While this album is great for music leaders in church, I don’t believe that the average listener will be singing along while driving in their cars." James Tate, reviewing the album at Charisma, writes, "Kingdom presents an array of blended sounds and styles sure to appeal to every ethnicity, age and even musical preference. More importantly, the album reflects and celebrates the diversity of God's people with a powerhouse of songwriting and musical production...sure to be sung in churches across the nation."

== Awards and accolades ==
This album was No. 20 on the Worship Leader's Top 20 Albums of 2014 list.

== Track listing ==
No.	Title	Writer(s)	Length
1.	"New Every Morning"	David Binion, Joshua Dufrene, Israel Houghton	5:23
2.	"Risen"	Binion, Dufrene, Houghton	4:57
3.	"Good to Me"	Binion, Dufrene, Houghton	4:31
4.	"Can't Stop Singing"	Binion, Dufrene, Houghton	4:27
5.	"Let the Name of Jesus Reign"	Binion, Dufrene, Colin Edge	5:48
6.	"Kingdom Come"	Binion, Dufrene, Edge	6:46
7.	"More Holy Spirit"	Binion, Dufrene, Edge, Houghton	9:41
8.	"Your Kingdom Knows No End"	Binion, Dufrene, Houghton	4:10
9.	"Closer"	Binion, Dufrene, Edge	5:43
10.	"Here Waiting"	Binion, Dufrene, Edge, Houghton	9:54
11.	"Not Ashamed"	Dufrene	7:04
12.	"First Loved Me"	Binion, Dufrene, Houghton	7:24
Total length:			75:48

== Chart performance ==
Chart (2014)	Peak position
US Billboard 200	113
US Top Christian Albums (Billboard)	2
