= Linebarrels of Iron =

Japanese manga series and its franchise

- Cover of the First tankōbon Volume

鉄のラインバレル (Kurogane no Rainbareru)
- Genre: Action, romance, science fiction
- Manga
- Written by: Eiichi Shimizu
- Illustrated by: Tomohiro Shimoguchi
- Published by: Akita Shoten
- Magazine: Champion Red
- Original run: December 19, 2004 – April 18, 2015
- Volumes: 26
- Manga

Volume 0
- Written by: Eiichi Shimizu
- Illustrated by: Tomohiro Shimoguchi
- Published by: Akita Shoten
- Magazine: Champion Red
- Published: December 20, 2006
- Volumes: 1
- Anime television series
- Directed by: Masamitsu Hidaka
- Produced by: Hiroyuki Birukawa; Osamu Nagai; Takaaki Kuwana; Yoshihiro Iwasa
- Written by: Kiyoko Yoshimura
- Music by: Conisch
- Studio: Gonzo
- Licensed by: AUS: Madman Entertainment; NA: Crunchyroll; UK: MVM Films
- Original network: TBS, CBC, Sun-TV
- Original run: October 3, 2008 – March 20, 2009
- Episodes: 24 + 2 OVAs

Linebarrels of Iron (鉄のラインバレル, Kurogane no Rainbareru) is a Japanese manga series written by Eiichi Shimizu and illustrated by Tomohiro Shimoguchi. The series was first serialized in Akita Shoten's monthly seinen manga magazine, Champion Red, in 2005. It has since been compiled into 24 tankōbon, as of October 20, 2014. The story centers on Kouichi Hayase, a fourteen-year-old boy living a mediocre life, until an accident turns him into the pilot of a gigantic robot called "Linebarrel" and leads him to encounter a mysterious girl.

An anime adaptation of the manga series was announced in the February issue of Animage magazine. The anime is directed by Masamitsu Hidaka and animated by Gonzo. Though the world premiere of the first episode took place at Southern California's 2008 Anime Expo, the series premiered in Japan on the television network TBS (Tokyo Broadcasting System) on October 3, 2008. The anime broadcast a total of twenty-four episodes, the last of which aired on March 20, 2009. To commemorate the series' anime adaptation, Shimizu and Shimoguchi decided to create a one shot manga, recreating the entire first episode of the anime, in which the plot differs in many aspects compared to the beginning of the manga.

== Plot ==
The Linebarrels of Iron story takes place in an alternate universe in the year 2019, centering on a junior-high school student named Kouichi Hayase, who escaped his daily life of being ridiculed as a child by daydreaming about being a hero. His life is forever changed during a class trip in 2016 when an artificial satellite falls from orbit. Due to this "accident", Kouichi is left in a coma for half a year, and upon awakening, found himself with strange powers, including superhuman strength. Three years later, a mysterious robot called "Linebarrel" appears before him. It is revealed that the accident from three years ago was actually caused by the Machina robot Linebarrel and that this turned him into a "Factor", which is the name given to Machina pilots. This leads him to encounter Emi Kizaki, a mysterious amnesiac girl whose unknown past seems to be related to Linebarrel. He joins her in fighting for JUDA, the world's largest medical equipment maker, which happens to secretly own several other Machina robots.

=== Machinas and Armas ===
There are two kinds of robots in Linebarrels of Iron: Armas and Machinas. The series primarily focuses on Machinas, robots which are not manufactured by humans and are powered by nanobots called D-S.O.I.L., also known as Drexler S.O.I.L., which also enable them to regenerate after being damaged. Since D-S.O.I.L. is like artificial muscle for the Machinas, they tend to "bleed" when they are damaged.

Machinas are also considered to have their own consciousness, as only their chosen "Factor" can pilot one, and should the Factor be killed, it will go on to find a replacement. The overlying reason for this is that all Machinas are incapable of intentionally killing another human on their own volition; they need a "Factor" i.e. another human, who would be the one who "kills". The Factor need not be actively piloting the machina for it to kill, as revealed when a rampaging Machina called Apparition was brought down by JUDA and the then-unaligned Hayase and it was found that the (dead) Factor was drugged and restrained inside it. Should it kill someone without a Factor's "assistance", usually by accident, a Machina has been known to resuscitate and heal the person by injecting their D-S.O.I.L nanobots into them, which in turn makes the person a Factor. This is case for Factor Reiji Moritsugu. In the case of Kouichi Hayase, then-Linebarrel pilot Emi Kizaki begged Linebarrel to heal him, which turned him into a Factor, at the expense of making Emi a less desirable Factor to Linebarrel ("It" does not want Emi to fight). In the anime it was revealed that Hayase's friend Hideaki Yajima was also resurrected by the Machina that caused his death.

In addition, a Machina can go into Overdrive, or a state of rampage which exponentially increase its capabilities, when its Factor's emotions go out of control. Machinas can also be stored in another dimension and appear before its Factor any time, excluding the Linebarrel. However, they cannot teleport if the Factor is inside it. Since there are only a limited amount of Machinas available and their true origins are unknown, humans created Armas, which are crude imitations of Machinas and do not have D-S.O.I.L. They can be piloted by anyone, but they cannot regenerate, nor they can perform at the level of true Machinas.

=== Human-Machina ===
It is revealed mid-way through the manga that a majority of humanity was wiped out after the development of Nanomachines and the Machina due to a kill-switch built into their DNA. Many years later a majority of the Machina have obtained self-awareness and destroyed what was left with many of them hunting down humans and human corpses to provide them with a "Factor". Unsatisfied with their lack of purpose, the 'Human-Machina' had remade humanity to try and find the purpose of life. Known named Human-Machina include Deus Ex Machina, their leader, a nanomachine-copy of Abraham Lincoln who "pilots" the Machina 'Rail-Splitter and his "daughter" Maxi Oba, pilot of the self-named Lovebarrel.

=== Machina-Humans ===
A concept unveiled in the anime. As the story in the anime unfolds it is learned that there exists a parallel universe adjacent to our own, where humanity reached incredible peaks of technology at the cost of their very nature, to the point where the human species as a whole became extinct after merging its own collective consciousness with the machines they created. Similar to a hive mind, this virtual collective unity threw away individuality and any sort of vestige of human feelings for the sake of power, becoming one cold, ruthless mechanical being bent on a continuous, endless expansion of itself. Referred to as "Central", this hive mind acts in a way reminiscent of the machines from the Matrix trilogy, even having its own enforcers to hunt down and destroy whoever is perceived as a hindrance.

== Characters ==
=== JUDA ===
From left to right: Emi Kizaki, Captain Shinobu Igarashi, Satoru Yamashita, Reiji Moritsugu, Kunio Ishigami, Yui Ogawa, Shizuna and Izuna Endo, and Kouichi Hayase.

Kouichi Hayase (早瀬 浩一, Hayase Kōichi)

Voiced by: Tetsuya Kakihara (Japanese); Jessie James Grelle (English)

The 14-year-old protagonist of the series. As a child he was prone to crying and being ridiculed by delinquents. However, he soon acquired, by death nonetheless, the powers of a Factor while forced through an off-limits area His future Machina Linebarrel, literally crash-landed on top of him and, sensing his life ending, revived him and linked with his life force after he becomes the first to be killed by Linebarrel. This endowed Kouichi with super-human physical abilities, however it caused major changes to his personality, making him very arrogant, prideful and overconfident, so much so that he himself became the actual gang leader of the delinquents. This strained considerably his relationship with others, especially his childhood friends, prompting Yajima to knock some sense into him. Only grievous events such as Yajima's own death and the humiliating defeats handed to him managed to benefit his maturity, forging a much more serious (albeit still reckless and a bit vain) character.
He pilots the titular Machina of the series, Linebarrel. The machine is regarded as the most powerful Machina of all, as its power output far exceeds any other Mecha presented in the franchise. It has a bulky appearance, though it is still capable of very fast performances, and its armament include two massive katanas holstered in wrist-mounted sheaths, and a beam-gun device named the Executor, housed in a compartment on the tail of the robot, whose sheer power is so great it can even generate a sustained energy beam, kilometers in length, that can be swung like a sword. Also, Linebarrel is the only Machina capable to achieve a so-called Override status, which increases dramatically its performance at the cost of putting a heavy strain on the pilot's body. Finally, Linebarrel can change into a more intimidating, jet-black form named simply Mode-B in the anime or Linebarrel Override in the manga, which grants it instant teleportation. The relationship between him and Kizaki in the beginning is terrible until all is revealed between them; after swearing to protect her, it is where feelings begin to develop between the two of them.
Emi Kizaki (城崎 絵美, Kizaki Emi)

Voiced by: Mamiko Noto (Japanese); Alexis Tipton (English)

A mysterious girl of whom initially nothing is known, Emi is the initial Factor (pilot) of Linebarrel, and indirectly the one responsible of Kouichi's "death". Of his same age, she appears as very polite and calm, though very strict and demanding if the situation arises, although sometimes quite clueless about things that should be perceived as obvious, such as asking what a Christmas party means. She is later revealed to be the younger sister of Katou Hisataka, and thus another traveler from the "other dimension" that spawned the Machinas themselves. Finally, it was she who introduced the special, black Mode-B function of Linebarrel.
Emi is the first pilot of Linebarrel, and thus she initially shared control of the Machina with Kouichi Hayase, until the latter took complete control over it. She was the first to use Linebarrel's Mode-B/Override in actual combat. She and Hayase become close after the past about him and her are discovered; she develops feelings for him as does he.
Reiji Moritsugu (森次 玲二, Moritsugu Reiji)

Voiced by: Yūichi Nakamura (Japanese); J. Michael Tatum (English)

Chief of the Special Task Force at JUDA Corporation, Reiji is an extremely calm, polite, and cold individual that takes his role with extreme seriousness, so much so that he's capable of physically punishing those who fail him in combat. His expertise in combat is regarded as the best JUDA can offer. Usually an enigmatic, unreadable figure, as a teenager he, much like Kouichi, believed in a strong sense of justice and thus pitted himself against delinquents, aided by the fact that since birth he lacked the sense of physical pain. In those times he was shown to revel in the violence he caused while "dealing justice", and frequently got in trouble with the local authorities, much to the chagrin of his older sister, which what was left of his family after the death of his parents. With her death, apparently at the hands of some thugs he had beaten, Reiji became disillusioned and searched relief in suicide, which he found by accidentally falling through a sinkhole and ending impaled through one of Vardant's swords. Thus, he was revived as a Factor and promptly recruited into JUDA, where he became the reason and inspiration for Satoru Yamashita. Indeed, his ruthlessness and coldness made him an arch-rival of Kouichi, though Reiji simply dismissed him as a nuisance, even toying with him in actual combat before subduing him brutally. During the course of the series, he feigned treason and allied himself with the Katou Organization, though only with the goal of aiding JUDA. Most ironically though, it was his ideal of justice that helped forge the megalomaniac dreams of his only true friend, Eiji Kiriyama. Eventually, Reiji becomes the chairman of Kiriyama's company and removes Eiji from his position as President. He also never defects from JUDA. On a side note, before becoming a Factor, Reiji was blonde-haired and, much like his Machina, lost his right eye while fighting.
Moritsugu pilots the blue, samurai-like Vardant. Less bulkier than other Machinas, it is equipped with a huge contraption on its back, which comes with eight coffin-like plates that act as shields, makeshift wings to increase dashing speed or mobility. Each of the coffin-like boxes house two long katana, which Vardant uses in pairs for each hand. Vardant is unable to see through its right eye, though it recovered when Reiji feigned his treachery. After those events, Vardant was stripped of its large winglike apparatus and instead equipped with a long range rifle and a pistol-like machine gun, whilst still using its trademark swords. Its mobility, coupled with Moritsugu's own prowess and lack of pain response, make Vardant one of the most powerful Machinas, mostly thanks to its pilot's skill alone. The Vardant later equips large gun-like weapons called Linear Rail Cannons during its fight with the Ka-Gaseo.
Satoru Yamashita (山下 サトル, Yamashita Satoru)

Voiced by: Miyuki Sawashiro (Japanese); Mary Morgan (English)

A Factor of JUDA's Special Task Force, Satoru made his way into the organization due to his body being extremely weak since birth, thus dooming him to an early death if not for his link to his Machina, Hind-Kind. Serious and energetic, with occasional bursts of cheerfulness, Satoru acts as a subordinate and an admirer for Reiji Moritsugu, whom he considers the one who introduced him to his future role as a Factor. Nevertheless, his fixation with Moritsugu borders on obsession, which occasionally costs his focus and efficiency in battle. Yamashita's manga incarnation is more grim and somewhat arrogant, convinced that all Factors are indeed murderers, though he strongly refuses the idea of being a killer himself. Satoru's androgynous appearance and stature have often had him mistaken for a girl, the subject of which has become a running gag within the manga/anime series. There is also considerable debate among fans as to Satoru's gender; However, in the manga, Satoru is introduced using the Japanese pronoun for 'he' which is, 'kare' appears in Hiragana next to the kanji for 'he' or 'him'; "そして彼が (Soshite kare ga) Yamashita Satoru-kun da." In addition, "Satoru" is a common masculine Japanese given name. He is given a more feminine look in episode 12 of the anime after being shown to wear a bikini to the beach; despite this, he is never seen topless to confirm such a claim - even in episode 16, when all the other members of the Task Force are forced to strip, he is the only one left with his shirt on.
Yamashita's Machina is the heavy assault platform Hind-Kind. Bright yellow and very bulky, its primary weapon are its huge fists, which can be ejected at high speed and distance thanks to ramjets mounted on the wrists and long, flexible tendrils made of the Machina's artificial muscles. On its hands there are independent, detachable probes usable for reconnaissance, and on its shoulders are mounted two massive artillery cannons with extremely long range and destructive power, making Hind-Kind pretty similar to a movable gun battery. However, being highly specialized in long to ultra-long range support, this Machina is easily outmatched in close combat.
Shizuna Endo (遠藤 シズナ, Endō Shizuna)

Voiced by: Kana Ueda (Japanese); Cherami Leigh (English)

Twin sister of Izuna Endo, unlike her brother, Shizuna is very brash, loud and arrogant, often being the sending end of Koichi's abuse. Ironically, she is also one of the most comical characters, being used herself in extremely embarrassing ways. Also, she appears to be very dominating with her brother, though she deeply cares for him. She fulfills the role of piloting her twin-seat Machina, the massive Deceive. Also, she appears to have developed a crush on Koichi, though she never dares to admit it. Before being given a hairpin by Koichi, she could only be differentiated from her brother through her darker hair color and the fact that she speaks in Kansai dialect.
Shizuna acts as the pilot of the twin-seated Deceive. An enormous Machina with a very strange shape, its body is loosely cigar-like, with an elongated stabilizer extending under it so as to maintain balance. Both sides of Deceive houses huge drums of cables known as Nerve Crackers, which when connected to other Machinas or Armas can link their occupants' minds with the twins' Machina.
Izuna Endo (遠藤 イズナ, Endō Izuna)

Voiced by: Rie Kugimiya (Japanese); Aaron Dismuke (English)

Twin brother of Shizuna Endo, Izuna is the complete opposite of his sister, being shy, introverted and very polite. Due to their similarity as twins, he is often confused with Shizuna and thus treated as a girl, much to his sister's chagrin, of whom he endures the constant uproars and pranks. He manages the hacking tendrils of the twins' Machina Deceive. He is also the one who conjures the hideous illusions that the Nerve Cracker device sends to its victims, which sharply contrasts with his humble and timid character. Izuna has a lighter hair color and speaks standard Japanese.
With his sister, Izuna is the second pilot of Deceive, and mans the sensory arrays and the long tendrils that acts as the Machina's only weapon - Deceive being a machine designed for reconnaissance and electronically induced psychological warfare. While he shares the controls of the machine with his sister, it is Izuna who ultimately takes the active role in combat, given the fact that it is he the one who sends haunting hallucinations or frightening nightmares through Deceive's Nerve Crackers. This duty leaves him in the most dangerous position, such as in the anime series when he almost went insane while controlling and destroyed Machina-human Mechas, given his direct link to their hive-mind.
Miu Kujō (九条 美海, Kujō Miu)

Voiced by: Aya Hirano (Japanese); Monica Rial (English)

A very polite, quiet and large-breasted individual, Miu (nicknamed Miu-Miu) acts as the gentle, sister-like figure of the Special Task Force of JUDA, working as a defensive support with her Machina, Painkiller. In the animated series, she joined JUDA after losing both her parents in a car accident, though no further background is provided for her. She was one of the few to support Kouchi at any given time, and developed a huge crush on him, though always surpassed by Emi Kizaki or Risako Niiyama. She almost killed herself in a desperate attempt to provide cover for Kouchi, showing how far she was willing to go for his well-being. Her manga counterpart is, on the other hand, far more grim and almost mentally unstable: this Miu is presented as part of a trio of Japanese idols and, while still quiet and gentle, she is also very insecure due to constant harassment and ridicule, so much in fact that she tried to commit suicide as a way to escape. She still developed feelings for Kouichi, after the latter saved her life and showed sincerely caring for her. Another huge difference is, while in the anime she prioritized the welfare of others, her manga incarnation is far more aggressive and ruthless while fighting, albeit still maintaining a very calm stance.
Miu's Machina is the pink, mid-to-long range support Mecha Painkiller, equipped with throwing knives and two beam rifles on each arm. Despite its considerable arsenal, Painkiller completely lacks close combat power, and its armament is also easily outclassed by most of the other Machinas. Its manga version, however, is dramatically different as it is Miu herself: with its armor being only an outer casing, Painkiller has an intimidating, jet-black and slender figure, armed with a huge chain-sword. Also, apparently it has control over mechanical beasts loosely based on ferocious animals that it can also combine with.
Kunio Ishigami (石神 邦生, Ishigami Kunio)

Voiced by: Jōji Nakata (Japanese); Barry Yandell (English)

Chief of the JUDA Corporation and also an ex-high-ranking officer of the Katou Organization, he left them when he found the idea of bloodshed promotion by Hisataka Katou revolting. A joyful and sometimes childish man, he is infamous for his devilish pranks, mistakes, and his apparent lecherousness, though he proved himself a great leader as well. While in the manga, his role is not expanded much over his duty as Director of JUDA. Ishigami originally served in the Japanese Navy and was Katou's subordinate. He piloted the Arma Susano-O and destroyed remaining Machina alongside him before becoming Juda's factor.
While Ishigami does not have a Machina (it could be assumed that he was the previous pilot of Glein-Neidr), in the manga he is indeed a Factor and has his own Machina, Juda. Only seen dormant, Juda has a large, discoidal head and an armor shaped like ceremonial robes, and its primary weapon is a huge, serpentine sword. The Machina was discovered by Katou and named itself after Judas due to it considering itself a traitor to the Machina.
Yui Ogawa (緒川 結衣, Ogawa Yui)

Voiced by: Sayaka Ohara (Japanese); Tiffany Grant (English)

Kunio Ishigami's personal secretary, Yui has a maternal role in the team, often giving advise to the young Factors, such as Kouichi or Emi. Often she is seen reprimanding her Chief Ishigami, due to his frequent pranks.
Rachel Calvin (レイチェル·キャルヴィン, Reicheru Kyaruvin)

Voiced by: Chiwa Saitō (Japanese); Tia Ballard (English)

A young girl with a genius mind coming from the United States, Rachel works as Chief of Research and Development for JUDA. Also, among her duties is the maintenance and analysis of the Machinas. She often ridicules Kouichi for his recklessness and occasional foolish statements.
Linebarrel
Linebarrel is one of the main protagonists in the series, and is piloted by both Kouichi Hayase and Emi Kizaki. Linebarrel's first Factor was Emi Kizaki however, became piloted by Kouichi Hayase after reviving him with its D-SOIL nano machines. Although Emi killed Kouichi, she begged Linebarrel to revive him, even though it would cost her to be an unlikely Factor for Linebarrel, and make Kouichi a more likable Factor. Linebarrel has a bulky appearance, though it is still capable of very fast performances, and its armament include two massive katanas holstered in wrist-mounted sheaths, and a beam-saber device named the Executor, housed in a compartment on the tail of the robot. The Executor was later revealed to be used as a cannon, and could be used about 3 or 6 times if power level was not adjusted (this role was reversed in the manga with the massive "beam sword" being an unintended side-effect caused by Kouichi blasting the Executor's output to maximum and having Linebarrel swinging it around). In both anime and manga series, Linebarrel is regarded as the strongest Machina of all. In both series, Linebarrel exceeds all Machina in power and D-SOIL recovery, and is the only Machina to receive an Override status and have two Factors, excluding Deceive. Although Linebarrel's armor is usually coated white it has the ability to change its structure and coating black, thus allowing it to instantaneously teleport, and enhance its power. This form is known as Linebarrel Mode-B or Linebarrel Override in the manga, however, during this transformation, the Factor is put through a huge strain, and overuse of this mode will burn the chassis of Linebarrel. Linebarrel is said to have super compressed transmission fields, and 36 differences compared to other Mecha, though doesn't reveal Mode-C in the series yet. Amagatsu Kizaki, Emi's father, once stored his brain within the Linebarrel, allowing him to control the machine while in Mode-B or the aptly named Linebarrel Amagatsu, taking the appearance of Mode-B with a new, one-eyed face, in the manga and later reveals how humanity became extinct to Kouichi. In the manga, Mode-C doesn't exist, instead being replaced by Linebarrel EX, Additional armor featuring 6 extra Katanas and Micro missiles stored on the back, and Linebarrel Overlord, A blood-red and black color variant caused by Kouchi fusing with the Linebarrel itself.

=== Katou Organization ===
Hisataka Katou (加藤 久嵩, Katō Hisataka)

Voiced by: Jun Fukuyama (Japanese); Todd Haberkorn (English)

Head of the Katou Organization, he is an enigmatic and chilly young man, very polite and calm even with the enemy, and very confident of himself, to the point of paying JUDA a personal visit in broad daylight. He was a superior do Kunio Ishigami, though the latter defected him after disagreeing with Katou's ideas, which called for world conquest and thus bloodshed. He is also revealed to be the biological older brother of Emi Kizaki. His role and background differs greatly in the manga and in the anime: while in the former he is depicted as a full-fledged villain with no known goals aside of world domination, in the anime he actually hails from the parallel universe where Machinas came from, and feigned his plains of conquest as a way to strengthen the human race as a whole to prepare them for the incoming invasion of his Machina-turned brethren, becoming something of an anti-hero. Later in the manga, it's revealed that Katou was Amagatsu Kizaki's lab assistant. He was forced to kill him in front of Emi in order to turn him into Linebarrel's factor and has no biological relation to her.
In the anime it is not specifically stated, but in the manga Hisataka is a Factor and the pilot of Shangri-La, the most massive Machina ever introduced and the mobile fortress of the Katou Organization itself. Its combat capabilities are not known, though it could be assumed to be a formidable foe only by the sheer number of Armas it carries, its role being that of a submersible-flying carrier more than a direct combat machine. During his machina destroying missions with Ishigam whilst in the Japanese Navy, Katou piloted the Arma Tsukuyomi which dual wielded two hatchets.
Masaki Sugawara (菅原 マサキ, Sugawara Masaki)

Voiced by: Susumu Chiba (Japanese); Tony Patterson (English)

The Second Division Captain of the Katou Organization and right-hand man of Hisataka Katou, also fulfilling the role of First Division Captain, Masaki is one of the most mysterious characters of the franchise. With a cowboy-like attire and his right eye always covered by his long hair, he is literally a human machine, being completely devoid of emotions, even in the direst situations. Not much is known about him in the manga, while in the anime it is later revealed that he was an enforcer for the Machina-turned human Collective-Mind, acting in a way reminiscent of the Agents from The Matrix. He was the ultimate opponent Kouichi faced in the anime, and tried to defeat him by merging his consciousness with the collective one of his mechanical species, though he was still obliterated in the end. In the manga, Masaki was found in the cockpit of Naked as a child after being defeated by Katou and Ishigami and was taken in by the two.
Masaki pilots the second-largest Machina presented, Glein-Neidr. It is an immense, spherical machine completely impervious to beam attacks, though vulnerable to any sort of live ammunition powerful enough to crack its armor. It mounts many energy beams on its outer shell, with a firepower that far outclasses most Machinas. Despite its size, it retains considerable agility and can extend legs and arms to fight in close combat. Finally, the cockpit of this Machina is itself another Machina, named Naked, which is armed with a huge blade named Eliminator. In the anime, Naked was also capable of instant teleportation, much like Linebarrel's Mode-B.
Dimitri Magarov (デミトリー・マガロフ, Demitorī Magarofu)

Voiced by: Tomoyuki Shimura (Japanese); Kent Williams (English)

The Third Division Captain of the Katou Organization, Demitry is an imposing, almost creepy, middle-aged man of apparent Russian origin that shares a superior-subordinate role with Takurou Sawatari. No background is provided for him, neither in the manga nor in the anime, so why or how he joined the Katou Organization is left unknown. However, his fate is left unaltered: he dies in both of his incarnations, in the manga massacred with his whole squad of Armas by three newly developed Jinrai Armas (literally, he was made an expendable target by Eiji Kiriyama), while in the anime he blows up with Judy Brown when the latter forces his Arma against a fuel tank and lets it explode.
He pilots the Arma, Kagutsuchi, which is completely devoted to long range attacks. It has huge plates of armor on its whole body, save for head and arms, and is equipped with missile launchers on both its shoulders, a huge machine gun on its right arm and a pistol on the left.
Takurō Sawatari (沢渡 拓郎, Sawatari Takurō)

Voiced by: Tetsu Inada (Japanese); Bryan Massey (English)

The Fourth Division Captain of the Katou Organization, who is a very violent and brutal man, he reveled in combat and developed something of an obsession for Linebarrel, which he almost always referred to with the moniker two horns. He had great respect for his comrade Demitry, whom he called master, and whom he vowed to avenge when the former died.
He pilots the Arma Idaten, equipped with a long spear and a Tanegashima-like gun. While inferior to original Machinas, it compensates with high speed, though lacks adequate armor to defend itself from highly destructive attacks. As an Arma, it is directly linked to the pilot so as to improve its generic potential. Shortly before the events of episode 18, it is upgraded Idaten Nogota, sporting a thruster pack on each shoulder. In the manga, he later becomes the Factor of the Final Machina, Lostbarrel, which is Linebarrel's counterpart.
Soubi Nakajima (中島 宗美, Nakajima Sōbi)

Voiced by: Hirofumi Nojima (Japanese); Ian Sinclair (English)

The Fifth Division Captain of the Katou Organization, Soubi is an elegant man wearing traditional Japanese attire. He was subject to some of the most heavy changes between his anime and manga incarnation: in the anime series he joined Katou after losing his wife, and is depicted as a sadist, particularly enjoying in slowly tormenting and torturing his opponent until it is left helpless, only to keep on so as to grant a slow, painful death, which he finds a perfect target in the humble Miu Kujou. Injured after Linebarrel cut his Machina in half, he was attacked by Masaki Sugiwara, using his life force to revive Eiji Kiriyama. He indeed survived, although now converted into a Machina-turned human and almost completely fused with his mech. He fought with his former comrades, Takurou Sawatari and Yurianne Faithful, though before being completely consumed by the machines, with the last glimpse of his humanity begged to be killed, a deed which Takurou reluctantly fulfilled. The manga incarnation of Soubi is less twisted: he was born from his own Machina Talisman, and later found by the villagers of a little rural community of the Japanese countryside. He was feared and revered as the son of a "demon god", until he was found and later convinced to join JUDA by Kouichi and comrades. In his manga incarnation, Soubi Nakajima was the first to show that Factors achieved immortality, himself being seventy years old while retaining a youthful appearance.
Soubi pilots the silver Machina Talisman. Loosely similar to a medieval knight, it is armed with a huge, multifunction, spear-like weapon named Tale of Kingdom, which has to be used with both hands. It acts as a makeshift shield when needed, and also can discharge highly damaging bursts of plasma.
Jack Smith (ジャック・スミス, Jakku Sumisu)

Voiced by: Yoshikazu Sato (Japanese, anime), Kenji Nomura (Super Robot Wars UX), Bob Carter (English, anime)

The Sixth Division Captain of the Katou Organization, Jack was unique on his own right, not only because he never fought aboard a Machina or Arma, but especially because he himself was such. An imposing, powerfully built man of great stature, Jack looks to be of African origin with an eye-patch on his right eye, and dreadlocks being his most striking features. While human-sized (though still larger than the average adult), he was capable of fighting on par with other Armas and even Machinas, proving himself a challenge even when facing Reiji Moritsugu aboard his Vardant. While an extremely powerful fighter, he follows something of a code of honor and does not really care about Katou's plans, only following him so as to find worthy opponents to fight with. In the anime, he develops a crush on Risako when he comes across on her cooking during the JUDA company retreat.
Yurianne Faithful (ユリアンヌ・フェイスフル, Yuriannu Feisufuru)

Voiced by: Emi Shinohara (Japanese); Michele Specht (English)

The Seventh Division Captain of the Katou Organization, an enigmatic and very attractive woman with red hair. In addition to being the only female in the upper echelons of the organization, Yurianne was also often seen in the company of Eiji Kiriyama, as an adviser of sorts (though it was likely she was there to monitor his actions). She deliberately likes to play with people with her actions, and in combat. She also often refers to Kouichi as 'Boku-chan', other than that, little is known about her. Once Reiji takes command of Eiji's company she defects to JUDA.
Yurianne pilots the Arma Tsubaki-Hime, a unique Arma whose design is smaller, slender and arguably more feminine compared to the standard Arma. Tsubaki-hime however, is so agile that it appears to disappear, a feat matched only by Linebarrel when in Mode-B. Its standard armament is a stylized halberd with two hand chainsaws located in holsters, built into the skirt armor. After her betrayal she pilots a Jinrai that wields the chainsaws from her Arma.
Riku Ousei (王政 陸, Ōsei Riku)

Voiced by: Daisuke Sakaguchi (Japanese); Sonny Strait (English)

The Eighth Division Captain of the Katou Organization, a grossly obese man of very short stature. An apparent psychopath, he believed in the imagination ideal promulgated by Katou to the extreme, killing people for his own amusement or only because they didn't imagined their deaths at his hands. During the events of the manga, it was stated that he was a terrorist who claimed over twenty thousand lives with a single bomb attack, and thus sentenced to serve as a criminally insane prisoner, before being recruited by Katou. With a habit of eating during combat or mid-sentence, he was initially thought dead. However, he had managed to escape and, on his own will, kidnapped Emi Kizaki as revenge after having his imagination being insulted. This prompted Katou himself to dispatch Takurou Sawatari to dispose of Riku, whose antics had become too foolish or psychotic to be tolerated. In the anime, he was the one controlling the US military satellite Helios in outer space, and was killed when Kouichi used Linebarrel's Executor to destroy the massive weapon.
Riku pilots the Arma Yaoyorozu, a deceptive machine with a large, fat build, yet an extreme mobility and a special coat of armor impervious to explosions and cutting attacks. Its only weapon is the huge number of explosive orbs it stores in its body, which are thrown in large number so as to chain their explosions and maximize their destructive power.

=== Others ===
Risako Niiyama (新山 理沙子, Niiyama Risako)

Voiced by: Noriko Shitaya (Japanese); Carrie Savage (English)

Kouichi's protective childhood friend, who has liked him romantically for a long time, and thus gets frustrated when she can not spend time with him or when other women are near him. Risako also has very large breasts. After 3 years have passed since Kouichi's disappearance, she has since moved on and has started dating Yajima.
Hideaki Yajima (矢島 英明, Yajima Hideaki)

Voiced by: Go Shinomiya (Japanese); Joel McDonald (English)

Another of Kouichi's childhood friend, Yakima often uses force to stop delinquents from ridiculing Kouichi since they were children, forming a solid bond with him. Much more level-headed than him though, he noticed the changes in his friend's attitude and tried to reason with him, to no avail, which prompted him to knock some sense in him. Such an instance however proved to be fatal for him, as while he and Kouichi were brawling, the sudden attack of the then-out of control Machina Apparition resulted in him being severely injured. He was saved from certain death when the same Machina that slaughtered him lost its Factor and chose him as its new one. He was then cured by the Katou Organization, which provided him with an artificial arm to replace his lost one. Both versions states that, while on the surface Yajima protected Kouichi, he did so only to gain Risako's attention, being deeply in love with her. These conflicting feelings led him to another harsh confrontation with Kouichi, after which the two friends were reconciled and stood side by side in the following events.
As a twist of fate, Yajima pilots the machine that killed him, the Machina Apparition. While of comparable size to Linebarrel, Apparition is much slender and thinner, lacking a huge outer casing. It is so far the only Machina capable of using optical camouflage, and is armed with a machine gun and an ultra-long range sniper rifle armed with high piercing bullets. As of Chapter 104, Yajima and Risato are dating.
Makoto Domyouji (道明寺 誠, Domyouji Makoto)

Voiced by: Jun Konno (Japanese); Jerry Jewell (English)

Kouichi's classmate, founder of the Hayase Corps, and eventual pilot of a custom white-colored Jinrai.
Mina Hayase (早瀬 美菜, Hayase Mina)
Kouichi's little sister.
Saki Yajima (矢島 紗季, Yajima Saki)
Yajima's litter sister.
Eiji Kiriyama (桐山 英治, Kiriyama Eiji)

Voiced by: Shō Hayami (Japanese); Vic Mignogna (English)

Director of Kiriyama Heavy Industries and responsible of the creation of the Jinrai (Thunderclap) Armas, he was childhood friend of Reiji Moritsugu, of whom greatly respected his ideals of justice. Apparently however, over time those ideals became twisted and warped, thus making him a greedy, arrogant and overconfident individual. His incarnations differs considerably: in the manga he used the Katou Organization as mere guinea pigs to show the prowess of the Jinrai, while in the anime he initially forged an alliance with them, though his greed for power prompted him to try and subdue them as well after staging a coup d'état that granted him control of Japan. Kiriyama was a Factor, and to crush the remains of JUDA after conquering Japan he fought them himself, though he was defeated after being publicly unmasked as a ruthless dictator and one of the stage figures of the coup. He was recovered by Katou, and thanks to Masaki Sugiwara, revived as a Machina-turned human. Being fused with his Machina made Kiriyama completely insane, and also heralded his demise when, while fighting JUDA a second time, he fused almost completely with his Machina and was obliterated, musing in his last moments on how he truly admired Reiji's old ideals and how he wanted to be a hero for him. Though in the manga, Eiji survived and went abroad with his father after being defeated by Linebarrel. He later returns as an ally of JUDA.
Eiji pilots the Machina Pretender, a machine most unique in that it is the only Machina that can transform, changing from a fighter jet to a walking mecha at high speed even in mid-flight. Despite its bizarre appearance it benefits from an enormous mobility and a huge degree of firepower, granted by a large number of missile launchers and wireless Nerve-Crackers identical to those used by Deceive. For close combat, it is armed with a massive combat knife.
Deus Ex Machina (デウスエクスマキナ, Deusuekusumakina)

Voiced by: Tesshō Genda (Super Robot Wars UX)

Leader of the Human Machina in the manga.

== Media ==
=== Manga ===
Written and illustrated by Eiichi Shimizu and Tomohiro Shimoguchi, the Linebarrels of Iron manga series was first serialized in Akita Shoten's monthly seinen manga magazine, Champion Red. The chapters of the series are still published in the magazine, and has since been compiled into twenty-four tankōbon as of October 20, 2014. This is excluding Volume 0, which was simultaneously released with the fifth volume. Akita Shoten also published a book containing details about the anime adaptation, simultaneously releasing it on the same day as the tenth volume. The manga is published by Editorial Ivrea in Spain for readers of Spanish. The first ten volumes of the manga had been already published.

To commemorate the series' anime adaptation, Shimizu and Shimoguchi decided to create a one shot manga which will be serialized in the forty-fourth issue of the Japanese manga magazine Weekly Shōnen Champion. It recreates the entire first episode of the anime, in which the plot differs in many aspects compared to the beginning of the manga.

Volume	Release date	ISBN	Chapters
0	December 20, 2006	ISBN 978-4-253-23160-2	—
1	June 6, 2005	ISBN 978-4-253-23161-9	1 - 5
2	November 1, 2005	ISBN 978-4-253-23162-6	6 - 10
3	April 20, 2006	ISBN 978-4-253-23163-3	11 - 15
4	August 18, 2006	ISBN 978-4-253-23164-0	16 - 19
5	December 20, 2006	ISBN 978-4-253-23165-7	20 - 23
6	April 20, 2007	ISBN 978-4-253-23166-4	24 - 27
7	August 21, 2007	ISBN 978-4-253-23167-1	28 - 31
8	December 20, 2007	ISBN 978-4-253-23168-8	32 - 35
9	April 18, 2008	ISBN 978-4-253-23169-5	36 - 39
10	September 19, 2008	ISBN 978-4-253-23170-1	40 - 43
11	November 20, 2008	ISBN 978-4-253-23411-5	44 - 46
12	March 19, 2009	ISBN 978-4-253-23412-2	47 - 51
13	August 20, 2009	ISBN 978-4-253-23413-9	52 - 55
14	December 18, 2009	ISBN 978-4-253-23414-6	56 - 59
15	May 5, 2010	ISBN 978-4-253-23415-3	60 - 64
16	October 20, 2010	ISBN 978-4-253-23416-0	65 - 69
17	March 19, 2011	ISBN 978-4-253-23417-7	70 - 74
18	August 19, 2011	ISBN 978-4-253-23418-4	75 - 79
19	January 20, 2012	ISBN 978-4-253-23419-1	
20	June 20, 2012	ISBN 978-4-253-23420-7	
21	January 18, 2013	ISBN 978-4-253-23421-4	
22	August 20, 2013	ISBN 978-4-253-23422-1	
23	April 18, 2014	ISBN 978-4-253-23423-8	
24	October 20, 2014	ISBN 978-4-253-23424-5	
25	August 20, 2015	ISBN 978-4-253-23425-2	
26	December 20, 2015	ISBN 4-253-23160-8	

=== Anime ===
The production of an anime adaptation for the Linebarrels of Iron manga was first revealed in Animate's preview information for the February issue of the anime and entertainment magazine Animage. It was later announced that Masamitsu Hidaka, most well known as the director for the Pokémon anime series, will be directing Gonzo studio's anime adaptation.

A gigantic robot and the girl of your dreams are what you get ... at the cost of your life.

— Tagline from English website.

Though the Japanese television premiere of the series was in October 2008, the world premiere of the first episode took place in the United States at Southern California's 2008 Anime Expo, which Masamitsu Hidaka attended as a Guest of Honor. An official English language Linebarrels of Iron website was put up just before the Anime Expo in order to promote the American premiere of the series. Other special screenings for the first episode also took place in France's Japan Expo in July and Germany's Animagic 2008 in August. The previewed first episode contained subtitles as it was still presented with its original Japanese dialogue.

The series first premiered on Japanese television on October 3, 2008. A total of twenty-four episodes aired, with the last of which being broadcast on March 20, 2009. Though the episodes aired first on the TBS (Tokyo Broadcasting System) television network, CBC and Sun-TV also broadcast the series; CBC aired it within an hour after TBS's initial broadcasts, and Sun-TV aired the episodes a week later.

In an agreement, in which Gonzo's corporate parent, the GDH group, decided to allow popular video-sharing websites to stream some of Gonzo's latest anime titles, Crunchyroll, an anime-sharing site, streams episodes of the Linebarrels of Iron anime two hours after its premiere in Japan. It is also illegally available on YouTube, though the only full episode available is episode one; Gonzo uploads only the first half of the following episodes, and to view the rest, viewers are directed to Crunchyroll.

As of March 25, 2008, JVC Entertainment has released a total of four DVD volumes in Japan, with the first being released on December 24, 2008. The fifth volume was scheduled to be released on April 22, 2009. Each volume contains one disc, with each one containing three episodes, save the first volume, which contains only the first episode. Every volume also contains extras, ranging from Drama CDs to original illustrations by the creator.

=== Music ===
Five pieces of theme music are used for the anime series; one opening theme, two ending themes and two insert songs. The opening theme is "Kitei no Tsurugi" (鬼帝の剣, Sword of the Demon King) by the Japanese band Ali Project, the ending themes are "Ame ga Furu" (雨が降る, Falling Rain) and "Remedy" by Maaya Sakamoto, and the insert songs are "Kokoro no Mama ni" (心のままに, State of My Heart) and "PROUD" by Lisa Komine. An orchestra version of "Kitei no Tsurugi" was also used as an insert song in episode 20. Ali Project released the "Kitei no Tsurugi" single on November 19, 2008, while "Ame ga Furu", Maaya's seventeenth single, was released on October 29, 2008. The second ending theme, "Remedy" was released within Maaya's sixth album, Kazeyomi, on January 14, 2009.

== Reception ==
While the manga has garnered attention from noted animators and manga artists like Yoshikazu Yasuhiko and Mamoru Nagano, who are both avid readers of the series and recommends the work, early reviews of the anime adaptation have been generally mixed. Four different reviewers from the anime and manga social networking site Anime News Network gave negative reviews based on the first few episodes; agreeing that the storyline is generic and predictable, and that it contains an easily detestable main character (Kouichi). Though the mecha designs were likable, the anime's characters designs and computer generated graphics were scrutinized and described as not being one of Gonzo's best. Despite one of the reviewers finding the anime "marginally more tolerable" by the second episode, she comments that, "Whether or not you will be horrified enough to stop watching this show will be determined by your own personal level of tolerance for Kouichi's hubris." Dani Moure of Mania, an entertainment website, believes that the first episode "does a good job of introducing the premise of the show," but finds it "predictable and full of several clichés." Also, though Moure comments that Kouichi is a dislikable character, he states that "he grows into his role with his belief that there is more to come from him." In Moure's reviews of further episodes, he comments on how the series remains entertaining, "developing into a solid show," and that "watching Kouichi struggle to cope with the power that's been presented to him is becoming interesting."

== See also ==
- Ultraman, another manga series by the same creators
