= The Kingdom Series =

- Author: Chuck Black
- Country: United States
- Language: English
- Genre: Fiction, allegory
- Publisher: Multnomah Publishing; Perfect Praise Publishing
- Published: 2006–2007
- Media type: Book series
- Followed by: The Knights of Arrethtrae

The Kingdom Series is a series of six Christian allegorical novels set in mythical Arrethtrae with the flavor of the Middle Ages, and written by Chuck Black of Williston, North Dakota. The books cover the span of time from Book of Genesis through the Book of Revelation. The books were jointly published in 2006–2007 by Multnomah Publishing and Black's own company, Perfect Praise Publishing. The Black family collaborated to write the books and Black's daughter wrote music to them.

== Books ==
- Kingdom’s Dawn - Book 1 (2006) : ISBN 1-59052-679-1
- Kingdom’s Hope - Book 2 (2006) : ISBN 1-59052-680-5
- Kingdom’s Edge - Book 3 (2006) : ISBN 1-59052-681-3
- Kingdom’s Call - Book 4 (2007) : ISBN 1-59052-750-X
- Kingdom’s Quest - Book 5 (2007) : ISBN 1-59052-749-6
- Kingdom’s Reign - Book 6 (2007) : ISBN 1-59052-682-1

== Sequels to The Kingdom Series ==
This series was followed by The Knights of Arrethtrae which is set in the same realm as The Kingdom Series. Black's third series, Wars of the Realm, was released in 2014. The Starlore Legacy, started releasing in 2019, with more books in the series still releasing.
