= Shigofumi: Letters from the Departed =

Franchise

- Cover art of the first DVD compilation released by Bandai Visual featuring main character Fumika

シゴフミ ～Stories of Last Letter～ (Shigofumi ~Stories of Last Letter~)
- Genre: Supernatural thriller; Suspense
- Light novel
- Written by: Ryō Amamiya
- Illustrated by: Poko
- Published by: MediaWorks
- Imprint: Dengeki Bunko
- Original run: October 10, 2006 – March 10, 2008
- Volumes: 4
- Anime television series
- Directed by: Tatsuo Satō
- Produced by: Atsushi Yukawa; Nobuhiro Osawa; Yuji Matsukura
- Written by: Ichirō Ōkouchi
- Music by: Hikaru Nanase
- Studio: J.C.Staff
- Licensed by: NA: Sentai Filmworks
- Original network: CTC, tvk, TV Saitama, KBS, Tokyo MX, Sun TV, MTV, BS11, GBS
- Original run: January 6, 2008 – March 22, 2008
- Episodes: 12
- Original video animation
- Directed by: Tatsuo Satō
- Written by: Ichirō Ōkouchi
- Music by: Hikaru Nanase
- Studio: J.C.Staff
- Licensed by: NA: Sentai Filmworks
- Released: September 26, 2008
- Runtime: 24 minutes

Shigofumi: Letters from the Departed, titled Shigofumi: Stories of Last Letter (シゴフミ ～Stories of Last Letter～) in Japan, or simply Shigofumi, is a Japanese anime television series created by Tomorō Yuzawa and produced by Bandai Visual and Genco, which aired in Japan on Chiba TV and other networks between January 6 and March 22, 2008, and contains twelve episodes. An original video animation episodes was included with the final anime DVD volume released on September 26, 2008. A light novel series was originally adapted from the anime's premise set by Tomorō Yuzawa, featuring story composition and illustrations by Ryō Amamiya and Poko, respectively. Four novels were published by MediaWorks under their Dengeki Bunko imprint between October 2006 and March 2008. Despite the novels being produced first, the anime is considered the original work, as stated by Yuzawa. The anime was acquired by Bandai Visual for English language localization. The title Shigofumi comes from the combination of the Japanese words for "after death" (死後, shigo), and "letter" (文, fumi), which literally translates to an "after death letter". However, the release was cancelled and Bandai Visual closed its North American branch. Sentai Filmworks picked up the license and released the entire series on DVD in 2010.

== Plot ==
Shigofumi primarily centers around a young-looking girl named Fumika who works as a mail carrier to deliver "after death letters" (死後文, shigofumi). These letters are written by people after they die and are delivered to the person the letter is addressed to in the living world. The letters contain things that the now-deceased could not say while they were alive, such as things they wanted to say before they died, or even to inform others about who killed them in the case of a murder. Accompanying Fumika is her talking staff Kanaka which can also float of its own accord and likes to be treated as if "she" were a human. In contrast to Fumika who is quiet and serious about her job, Kanaka is loud and boisterous. The story follows Fumika and Kanaka as they interact with the living via the shigofumi. Shigofumi mail carriers are assigned a specific area that they deliver letters to, just like a normal mail carrier. When they are not delivering letters from the dead, they are in another realm called Shigo. The mail carriers are usually now-dead humans who do not age, and take on the appearance of just before they died, but Fumika does age, signifying that she is not dead yet.

== Characters ==
Fumika (フミカ/文歌)
Voiced by: Kana Ueda
Fumika is the main character in the anime series. She appears to be a young girl, though her real age is never mentioned. She works as a mail carrier from the afterlife realm of Shigo, delivering what are known as "shigofumi" to people in a Japanese city that she has been assigned to. These shigofumi are letters written by those who have recently died, and it is Fumika's job to deliver the letters to whoever the dead wanted them to go to. Though typically the shigofumi mail carriers are people who have already died, and thus do not age, Fumika is different in that she ages at the same rate as a normal person, signifying that she has not died yet but is merely in a state of astral projection.
Fumika is almost always calm and speaks in a low monotonic voice. She is serious about her job and carries out her duties even if it takes her longer to deliver a given letter, such as her having to follow the recipient by train to another part of Japan. She does not like normal people interfering with her work, and often has to resort to violence or threaten others with a large gun she carries in order to complete her deliveries. Due to her unusual occupation and the uniform she wears, she is generally not taken seriously when she tells others that she is delivering an "after death letter" to them, but continues to persist until she has handed over the letter. The only time she shows any expression is when around cats which make her very agitated to the point of her losing her composure entirely.
While still the main focus in the light novels, her character is somewhat different. She still appears the same and generally carries the same personality, though Fumika in the novel, for one, hates all insects vehemently and will not even go near them. She loves to play shogi (Japanese chess), though she plays on only intuition alone.
Fumika actually suffers from dissociative identity disorder due to the abuse from her father, Kirameki Mikawa, while growing up. The two personalities are Fumi and Mika. Mika is the shigofumi mail carrier that takes her job very seriously; and Fumi is a kind, outgoing young girl. Mika is the one that shot Kirameki when he tried to kill Fumika when she made him remember her mother. Fumi blamed herself for the shooting, withdrawing to a coma-like state, causing Mika to "die". Mika has said that even her words do not reach Fumi.
Kanaka/Mayama (カナカ/マヤマ)
Voiced by: Yuki Matsuoka
The artificial intelligence staff that Fumika carries is named Kanaka in the anime and Mayama in the light novels, and are drastically different between the two media. The function of the staff is meant to aid the shigofumi mail carrier by keeping track of senders, receivers, the delivery area, and supplementing other usual tasks. The mail carrier can give the staff a numeral code pertaining to a program which can be activated and aid the mail carrier further, such as turning them invisible, or supplementing white wings on their back to enable them to fly, though there are time limits on these programs. The staffs carry their own personalities and have the ability to levitate. In the anime, Fumika's staff Kanaka has a female voice and a loud, boisterous personality which directly contrasts Fumika's otherwise placid disposition. Kanaka often gives Fumika her opinion on matters pertaining to who she is delivering letter to, though Fumika just goes along her business as usual either way. Despite technically not being alive, Kanaka still insists that "she" be referred to as a person, or in terms of what a person would do, such as while levitating or regenerating which she calls "standing" and "sleeping" respectively. Kanaka is prone to making mistakes while on the job, such as misplacing letters.
In the light novels, Mayama as the staff is called, has a young boy's voice, though still serves the same function of supporting Fumika in her delivering. "He" always talks down to Fumika and proves her to be wrong in certain situations. He has never been able to beat Fumika at shogi, though he can still do things she cannot, such as reading foreign languages.
Chiaki (チアキ)
Voiced by: Masumi Asano
Chiaki is Fumika's coworker and superior, though unlike Fumika, Chiaki has already died. Chiaki died due to a car accident and thus retains the appearance of how she looked before she died, which happens to be very similar to Fumika, though Chiaki does not age. She says she is "over twenty-one-years-old" (and admits in that she died over 'fifty years ago'), however looks roughly as old as Fumika is. She is assigned a different city in Japan than Fumika, and the two rarely ever meet on Earth, but do see each other more often when in Shigo. Chiaki has a bright personality and likes to express her emotions outwardly, whether they be related to frustration, or happiness. As observed by Fumika, Chiaki usually is not as diligent about her job as Fumika is, and if a delivery is too much of a pain, she will generally drop it, marking the letter with an invalid addressee.
Matoma (マトマ)
Voiced by: Masayuki Katō
Matoma is the staff that Chiaki carries and like Fumika's staff, helps her with her job. Matoma has a male voice and speaks in a monotonic tone. He is better at the job than Kanaka is and talks down to Kanaka for doing a poor job. Kanaka in turn needles Matoma by mocking him by twisting his name as in calling him 'Tomato Juice'.
Kaname Nojima (野島 要, Nojima Kaname)
Voiced by: Takuma Terashima
Kaname is a male high school student who briefly knew Fumika Mikawa back in junior-high school when they were in the same class. After he initially met Fumika the mail carrier, he recognized her face and was reminded how Fumika had shot her father three years prior, which led him to continue to search for Fumika later on. Kaname had liked Fumika in junior-high, and even went so far as to confess his love to her, but she rejected him, though Fumika the mail carrier later tells him that she was merely surprised and does not dislike him. Even now, it would seem he still has feelings for Fumika.
Natsuka Kasai (葛西 夏香, Kasai Natsuka)
Voiced by: Saeko Chiba
Natsuka is an energetic high school girl who knew Fumika from junior-high school when they were in the same class, though they first talked in the school infirmary. She has a tendency to like guys who are intelligent and even goes as far as to read the same books of guys she likes; incidentally, she likes Kaname who is one such type. After Kaname comes to her regarding information pertaining to Fumika, she gets involved with him in his search to discover what really happened to Fumika three years prior to the beginning of the story.
Kirameki Mikawa (美川 キラメキ, Mikawa Kirameki)
Voiced by: Rikiya Koyama
Kirameki is a famous writer and the father of Fumika Mikawa. He is obsessed with beauty, and goes so far as to suggest that ugly people should kill themselves. Kirameki lives and works in a twisted glass building called "The forever leading silver road". His name, Kirameki, translates to glitter, or twinkle.

== Media ==
Shigofumi light novel volume 1.

=== Light novels ===
Shigofumi was first released as a series of light novels written by Ryō Amamiya, and drawn by Poko. Despite the novels being produced first, the anime series is considered by Tomorō Yuzawa as the original work. The novels are published by MediaWorks under their Dengeki Bunko imprint. The first novel was released on October 10, 2006, with the fourth, and final, volume published on March 10, 2008. The story from the novels differs somewhat from that of the anime.

=== Internet radio show ===
An Internet radio show called Shigofumi Maruhi Nippō (シゴフミ マル秘日報), hosted by Beat Net Radio!, originally had a pre-broadcast on December 28, 2007, and another the following the week on January 4, 2008; these two broadcasts served as an introduction to what the show would consist of, and also asking listeners to send in comments and questions about the show. Regular weekly broadcasts every Friday began the following week on January 11, 2008. The show has two hosts — Kana Ueda and Masumi Asano who play Fumika and Chiaki in the anime respectively — and is produced by Bandai Visual. There are three corners on the show, which is used mainly to promote the anime version.

=== Anime ===
The anime, directed by Tatsuo Satō and written by Ichirō Ōkouchi, features original character designs by Kouhaku Kuroboshi and assistant direction by Katsushi Sakurabi. Animated by J.C.Staff and produced by Bandai Visual and Genco, it first aired in Japan on numerous UHF stations and BS11 between January 6 and March 22, 2008, containing twelve episodes. The series was released in six DVD compilations in Japan by Bandai Visual between March 25 and August 22, 2008. Presented on a 16:9 anamorphic frame rate, the DVDs feature the two episodes each along with numerous extras, including audio commentary, liner notes, picture dramas, and Shigofumi letter sets. An original video animation episode was released on DVD on September 26, 2008. The televised broadcast of episodes three and eight, "Friends" and "Beginning," respectively, were "altered in light of recent circumstances in the society at large," as reported on the anime's official website. Sun TV also ceased broadcast of Shigofumi episode six and resumed broadcasting with episode seven. Other recent 2007 anime series which were changed due to current events in Japan include School Days, Higurashi no Naku Koro ni Kai, and Kodomo no Jikan.

The anime was licensed by Bandai Visual for English language localization, and the first DVD release was originally scheduled for May 13, 2008, but was placed on hold as Bandai Visual reconsidered their release plans. The series was later released by Sentai Filmworks on August 17, 2010, in North America.

Two pieces of theme music are used for the anime: one opening theme and one ending theme. The opening theme, "Kotodama" (コトダマ; "Power of Language"), is performed by Ali Project, and the single was released on January 23, 2008. Written by Saori Kodama with composition and arrangement by Pe-jun, the ending theme "Chain" is performed by Snow*; it was released on February 6, 2008. The anime's original soundtrack was released on March 26, 2008; each of the albums are released by Lantis.
