= Kingdom (magazine) =

- Frequency: Quarterly
- Publisher: North & Warren
- First issue: December 2003
- Country: United States
- Based in: New York
- Language: English
- Website: www.kingdom.golf

Kingdom is a quarterly magazine covering aspects of luxury golfing lifestyle, conceived and built in association with American golfer Arnold Palmer. The magazine was first published in December 2003. The magazine is published by Marketing and Advertising Specialists, North & Warren, and was founded by publisher, Matthew Squire, and the then president of Arnold Palmer Design Company, Ed Seay.

Originally an annual magazine solely for the private members of Arnold Palmer designed golf courses, Kingdom is now widely available. Averaging 200 pages in length and weighing over two pounds, it can be considered a coffee table publication. Editorial content is not limited to Palmer; many celebrities and golfers from Tom Watson to Vince Gill have appeared. There are also features on travel, golf, design, fitness, and other lifestyle articles.

The magazine has drawn critical praise for its standard of production and design, an aspect that has been principally driven by British art director, Matthew Halnan. The magazine also has an accompanying website, kingdom.golf which, along with the print magazine, is overseen by Los Angeles lifestyle editor Reade Tilley and golf editor Robin Barwick.

The magazine is also featured on Arnold Palmer's website.
