= Ali Project =

Japanese band

- Ali Project performs at their first North American concert in Seattle, Washington

Background information
- Origin: Japan
- Genres: Post-progressive; baroque pop; neoclassical dark wave
- Years active: 1988–present
- Labels: Lantis (2010–present); Mellow Head (2007–2010); Tokuma Japan Communications (2001–present); Flying Dog (2008); Atmark Corporation (2003); Victor Entertainment (2002–2006); Columbia Music Entertainment (1998); EMI Music Japan (1992–1994); Polydor Records (1988)
- Members: Arika Takarano; Mikiya Katakura
- Website: http://aliproject.jp/

Ali Project (typeset as ALI PROJECT) is a Japanese prog band with a strong Japanese aristocrat-style image, consisting of Arika Takarano (宝野アリカ, Takarano Arika; vocals & lyrics) and Mikiya Katakura (片倉三起也, Katakura Mikiya; music & arrangement).

The band's work is divided into two styles, which lead singer/lyricist Arika Takarano has termed White Alice (白アリ, Shiro Ari) for the band's light, cheerful and/or refreshing songs, and Black Alice (黒アリ, Kuro Ari) for songs that take on a darker and more mysterious tone.

== Career ==
They made their indie debut in the charts in 1988 as Ari (Ant) Project (蟻プロジェクト, Ari Purojekuto) with their album "Fantastic Garden" (幻想庭園, Gensō Teien). The album was later included in Tatsumi Takayuki's book Philosophy of Progressive Rock (プログレッシヴ・ロックの哲学, Puroguresshivu Rokku no Tetsugaku), which led to the band being classified under the progressive rock/pop genre. Takarano later endorsed this description.

Four years later in 1992 they changed their name and made their major debut with their single "Fall in love, maiden" (恋せよ乙女, Koi-seyo otome). Notably, Japan's phonetic system meant the band's Japanese pronunciation was unchanged, giving Ali (アリ) the potential to refer to Ant, a shortened Alice, or a shortened Arika.

Most of their records are released by Toshiba-EMI, Victor Entertainment and Tokuma Japan. The band is notable in the anime community for having their songs featured in several anime productions, including Noir, Rozen Maiden, Kamichama Karin, .hack//Roots, Linebarrels of Iron, Code Geass, Phantom -Requiem for the Phantom-, Fate/Extra, Shigofumi, Another, Katanagatari, Rakudai Kishi no Cavalry, and Irina: The Vampire Cosmonaut. Additionally, Mikiya Katakura has also provided the soundtrack to several anime series, such as Kaibutsu Oujo and Avenger.

=== Overseas Concerts ===
Ali Project performed their debut concert in the United States at Sakura-Con 2008 in Seattle, Washington. In 2016, the band performed at Anime Boston, and in 2017, they returned to the United States as part of Anisong World Matsuri at Anime Expo in Los Angeles.
