= Yoko Kikuchi =

Japanese animator and character designer

- 菊地 洋子
- Occupations: Animator, character designer artist
- Employer(s): Bee Train; Studio DEEN; Production I.G
- Spouse: Eiji Suganuma
- Children: 1

Yoko Kikuchi (菊地 洋子, Kikuchi Yōko) is a Japanese animator and character designer. She has participated in numerous anime TV series produced by Bee Train and Studio Fantasia. She is married to fellow animator Eiji Suganuma, and in 2000 they had a child.

== Filmography ==
=== Anime television ===
Year	Title	Role	Note
1992	Yu Yu Hakusho	Key Animation	
1996	Jigoku Sensei Nube	In-Between Animation	
1998	Silent Möbius	Key Animation (ep 25)	
1998	Cardcaptor Sakura	Key Animation (eps. 7, 34)	
1999	Arc the Lad	Character Design, Animation Director	
2001	Noir	Director (ED), Character Design, Animation Director (ED), Animation (OP)	
2001	Tantei Shōnen Kageman	Announcer, Obachan	Voice role
2002	Petite Princess Yucie	Key Animation (eps. 10, 16, 26)	
2003	.hack//Legend Of The Twilight	Character Design, Animation Director (eps 1, 12), Cover Art	
2003	Rumbling Hearts	Character Design, Chief Animation Director	
2005	Tsubasa RESERVoir CHRoNiCLE	Key Animation (eps. 26)	
2006	Le Chevalier D'Eon	Key Animation (ep 1)	
2007	El Cazador de la Bruja	Character Design, Animation Director (eps 1, 13, 26), Key Animation Supervisor (OP, ED)	
2008	Junjō Romantica	Character Design	
2008	Junjō Romantica 2	Character Design	
2009	Phantom ~Requiem for the Phantom~	Character Design, Animation (OP1)	
2009	Umineko When They Cry	Character Design, Chief Animation Director, Animation Director (ep 26)	
2010	Hakuōki	Key Animation (ep 12)	
2011	The World's Greatest First Love	Character Design, Animation Director (OP, ED)	
2012	Kuroko's Basketball	Character Design	
2016	Pretty Guardian Sailor Moon Crystal Season III	Key Animation (eps. 1, 13)	TV anime (Death Busters arc)
2018	Cardcaptor Sakura: Clear Card	Key Animation (eps. 15)	
2018	My Hero Academia	2nd Key Animation (eps. 47, 54), Key Animation (eps. 59, 61, 63)	Season 3
2019	Carol & Tuesday	2nd Key Animation (eps. 8, 19), Design Cooperation (eps. 23-24), Key Animation (OP2; eps. 1-2, 4, 7, 11, 13, 17, 20), Music Scene Animation (eps. 24)	
2019	My Hero Academia	2nd Key Animation (eps. 77)	Season 4
2024	Ishura	Character Design	
2024	Twilight Out of Focus	Character Design	
2025	Mechanical Marie	Character Design	

=== Anime films ===
Year	Title	Role	Note
1995	Slayers: The Motion Picture	Key Animation	
1995	Macross Plus Movie Edition	Key Animation	
1998	Case Closed: The Fourteenth Target	Key Animation	
2000	Ah! My Goddess: The Movie	Key Animation	
2005	Tsubasa Reservoir Chronicle the Movie: The Princess in the Birdcage Kingdom	Character Design, Animation Director	
2009	Yatterman	Key Animation	
2010	Fate/stay night: Unlimited Blade Works	Key Animation	
2011	Sengoku Basara: The Last Party	Key Animation	
2014	The World's Greatest First Love: The Case of Takafumi Yokozawa	Character Design	
2014	The World's Greatest First Love: Valentine arc	Character Design	
2020	The World's Greatest First Love: Proposal arc	Character Design	
2021	Pretty Guardian Sailor Moon Eternal: The Movie	Chief Animation Director (Part 1), Animation Director (Part 1), Key Animation (Part 1–2)	2-Part film, Season 4 of Sailor Moon Crystal (Dead Moon arc)

=== OVA (Original video animations) ===
Year	Title	Role	Note
1992	Giant Robo	Key Animation	
1994	Dirty Pair Flash: Mission I	Key Animation	
1994	Macross Plus	Key Animation	
1996	Ninja Cadets	Original Drawing	
1996	The Adventures of Kotetsu	Character Design, Animation Director	
1997	Agent Aika	Animation Director (eps 2, 4–5), Assistant Character Design, Key Animation (Special Trial; eps 1–7)	
1998	Geobreeders	Key Animation	
2000	Labyrinth of Flames	Character Design	
2005	Kirameki Project	Character Design, Animation Director (ep 1)	
2005	Saikano: Another Love Song	Key Animation	
2007	Tsubasa Tokyo Revelations	Character Design, Animation Director (ED; eps. 3)	
2009	Tsubasa: Shunraiki	Character Design, Animation Director (OP), Key Animation (OP)	
