= List of Noir episodes =

Noir DVD 4 cover.

The anime series Noir was directed by Koichi Mashimo, written by Ryoe Tsukimura, and produced by Bee Train. It follows two young female assassins who embark on a journey to seek answers about their past. While at first they seem to be only vaguely connected to each other, developments throughout the episodes indicate that their lives have been intertwined since childhood.

== Episode list ==
No.	Title	Original release date
1	"Maidens with Black Hands"; Transliteration: "Kuroki Te no Shojo-tachi" (Japanese: 黒き手の処女たち)	April 6, 2001
Mireille Bouquet, an assassin based in Paris, receives an e-mail from a Japanese girl named Kirika Yuumura, who invites her on "a pilgrimage for the past". Initially, Mireille dismisses the message as cryptic nonsense, but then the e-mail plays a tune that Mireille recognizes. Mireille goes to Tokyo and follows Kirika to a construction site. There, they are attacked by numerous men wearing business suits. Afterwards, Mireille and Kirika go to where Kirika is living. Kirika tells Mireille that she woke up one day in her apartment alone and without any memories. She has a fake ID card, a Beretta M1934 pistol, and a pocketwatch that plays a tune when opened. Mireille agrees to help Kirika uncover her past since the watch indicates that they may have a shared history. However, Mireille also says that she will kill Kirika after their mission is complete. Back in Paris, the two announce their availability as guns-for-hire, using the codename "Noir".
2	"Daily Bread"; Transliteration: "Hibi no Kate" (Japanese: 日々の糧)	April 13, 2001
A member of GIGN and his family are murdered by a bomb in their home. As he is the third of his unit to be killed, his superiors fear that they may have a mole. A rival faction of the terrorists responsible for the killings hires Noir to eliminate the mole and his associates. Mireille and Kirika break into the terrorists' hideout and kill the people responsible for the hits on GIGN personnel.
3	"The Assassination Play"; Transliteration: "Ansatsu Yūgi" (Japanese: 暗殺遊戯)	April 20, 2001
An anonymous entity hires Noir to kill a businessman who purportedly killed the husband of a woman whom Mireille sees in a graveyard from time to time. However, Mireille and Kirika discover that the woman and the businessman were hired by a third party to kill them. Mireille and Kirika manage to kill their opponents. Mireille asks the woman to tell her who hired them to take out Noir, but the woman asks Mireille if she would divulge the information under similar circumstances. Back in their apartment, Mireille and Kirika speculate that whoever contracted the hit also created Kirika's false documents.
4	"The Sound of Waves"; Transliteration: "Nami no Oto" (Japanese: 波の音)	April 27, 2001
Mireille and Kirika travel to a Mediterranean country called Ulgia, where the Atride Corporation is helping the military to consolidate its power. Mireille and Kirika are there to kill Atride's top executives. While observing Atride's CEO Hammond at the airport, Mireille and Kirika see that his fifteen-year-old daughter Rosalie has arrived uninvited to spend her upcoming birthday with him. When Atride receives an anonymous tip regarding Noir's location, Hammond tells the Ulgian military to attack Noir. Ulgian soldiers surround Mireille and Kirika in their house at the sea, but the two women manage to escape and attack Atride in their offices. After killing Hammond, Kirika encounters Rosalie in the streets but does not say anything.
5	"Les Soldats"; Transliteration: "Re Soruda" (Japanese: レ·ソルダ)	May 4, 2001
When Mireille and Kirika go to a friend's house to obtain information, they find him and his family dead. Mireille's investigation leads her into the catacombs of St. Galan's cathedral, where she finds a copy of a poem. Back at the surface, an armed man takes the copy from her. Kirika appears from out of the darkness before the man can kill Mireille, but he is not alone either. A firefight ensues, during which the man and his company are killed. Back in their apartment, Mireille deduces from what little the man had said and from the poem that their enemy's name is "Les Soldats". She then tells Kirika that, when she was a child, her parents were killed by an unknown assassin. That was also the last time that Mireille saw the watch that Kirika found in her apartment back in Japan.
6	"Lost Kitten"; Transliteration: "Mayoi Neko" (Japanese: 迷い猫)	May 11, 2001
Mireille and Kirika travel to Russia to assassinate Yuri Nazarov, a former KGB agent responsible for ordering the mass execution of the Tashkil minority. Nazarov now spends his time helping others without recompense. Kirika finds a lost kitten and takes care of it. One day, while out on a walk with the kitten, Kirika encounters Nazarov, who is the cat's owner. During this meeting, Nazarov collapses in pain. Kirika brings a doctor to Nazarov, who stabilizes him. Mireille and Kirika uncover Nazarov's past. The Tashkil had murdered Nazarov's family due to an ongoing ethnic feud. In his retirement, Nazarov has tried to atone for his deeds by providing food to the poor. Kirika's resolve wavers, but she eventually carries out her task.
7	"The Black Thread of Fate"; Transliteration: "Unmei no Kuroi Ito" (Japanese: 運命の黒い糸)	May 18, 2001
Kirika is wounded when she and Mireille are on an assignment to assassinate the leader of a revolutionary movement in the Middle East. They miss their rendezvous with a helicopter. While in hiding, Mireille considers killing her partner. However, she decides against it since Kirika is her only lead to Les Soldats. The revolutionaries capture Kirika while Mireille is buying supplies, but the duo manage to escape.
8	"Intoccabile Act 1"; Transliteration: "Intokkābire acte I" (Japanese: イントッカービレ acte I)	May 25, 2001
Mireille and Kirika kill a leading member of the Cosa Nostra in New York City. To deal with Noir, the Mafia summon Lady Silvana Greone, the "Intoccabile", from Sicily. Silvana sets a trap at her forest cottage in New Jersey, where she awaits Noir with three of Sicily's best killers, known as "The Three Mafia Saints". Kirika fights two of them, Paolo and Dominic, outside. Mireille enters the cottage, where she kills the third one, Francesco. However, she is unable to fight Silvana, whom she has feared ever since they first met as young girls.
9	"Intoccabile Act 2"; Transliteration: "Intokkābire acte II" (Japanese: イントッカービレ acte II)	June 1, 2001
Having seen Mireille's face, Silvana leaves the U.S. for Sicily, as does Noir. Mireille visits the coast where she first met Silvana. The Intoccabile appears, gives Mireille the kiss of death, and tells her that she will be waiting for her at an ancient temple. At the temple, Kirika manages to kill Paolo and Dominic despite several injuries. Mireille faces Silvana, who charges at her with her dagger. Kirika arrives just in time to shatter the dagger with a bullet before Silvana can hurt Mireille. Mireille and Silvana grab each other's dropped weapons, but this time, Mireille is faster than her childhood friend.
10	"The True Noir"; Transliteration: "Shin no Nowāru" (Japanese: 真のノワール)	June 8, 2001
Mireille and Kirika accept a contract to kill a corrupt policeman as well as the corrupt Judge D'Estaing. However, someone else kills the policeman before they can. Mireille and Kirika receive the first half of their payment, indicating that the underworld believes that they were responsible for the task. Later, a young woman named Chloe awaits D'Estaing in his workroom. She admits killing the policeman and warns him that Noir will kill him, too. When Mireille and Kirika confront D'Estaing in a library at night, they are suddenly surrounded by policemen. Chloe appears; the three of them fight and kill the policemen. Afterwards, Chloe kills D'Estaing and introduces herself as the "True Noir". Mireille and Kirika point their guns at Chloe, but she is unfazed. As Chloe coolly walks past them, Mireille tries to pivot quickly to train her gun on her again. However, Chloe holds up a knife and challenges them to see who is faster. Mireille and Kirika freeze, letting Chloe disappear into the night again.
11	"Moonlit Tea Party"; Transliteration: "Gekka no Chaen" (Japanese: 月下之茶宴)	June 15, 2001
Mireille and Kirika are contacted by an old man working for Les Soldats. They meet him in a park. After a short conversation, he tells them that they should meet again in three days and leaves. The two speculate that the encounter is somehow related to their recent meeting with Chloe. Chloe visits the old man and kills him. At the appointed time in the park, Mireille and Kirika fight and kill a number of men in suits. Back in their apartment, Mireille and Kirika ponder the meaning of the old man's words. Chloe knocks on the door and enters, uninvited, after Mireille opens the door. Mireille considers shooting her, but Kirika invites her to have some tea. As she leaves, Chloe asks whether she may keep the olive fork that Kirika hid in her sleeve in case the situation escalated.
12	"Assassination Mission"; Transliteration: "Shikaku-kō" (Japanese: 刺客行)	June 22, 2001
Altena, one of Les Soldats' high priestesses, sends Chloe to Switzerland to assassinate Deiter Reimann, a former West German military general who used to work for Les Soldats during the Cold War, but has since retired. Well aware of her intentions, Reimann takes Chloe on a mountain hike. There, they are ambushed by an assault team intent on killing Reimann. Chloe disposes of them. Later, Reimann tells her of his life, how he and his East German rival, Conrad Zellner of the Stasi, went so far as to kill each other's families. Afterwards, Chloe completes her assignment and heads to Germany, where she seeks out Zellner and kills him as well. Finally, Chloe returns to the Manor, where she lives with Altena, and tells Altena of her encounter with Kirika.
13	"Season of Hell"; Transliteration: "Jigoku no Kisetsu" (Japanese: 地獄の季節)	June 29, 2001
Mireille visits her hairdresser, Paulette, who is also a source of underworld information. Paulette tells Mireille that an old enemy, Christian Galle, has returned to Paris for revenge. Soon after, Galle and his associates attack Mireille and Kirika in a park at night. They escape due to Kirika's hesitation, and her almost getting run over by the getaway car. Meanwhile, Kirika meets Milosh Havel, a former Czechoslovak soldier who served in the Foreign Legion. Kirika and Milosh share many afternoons together painting landscapes by the Seine. Mireille then warns Kirika that she should stop seeing Milosh, but Kirika doesn't understand why. One day, Milosh tells Kirika that he will reenlist in the Foreign Legion. After they part ways, Kirika runs after Milosh to give him a farewell present. Galle sees Kirika and begins shooting at her. Kirika leaps out of harm's way, but Milosh is mortally wounded. Before he dies, Milosh is surprised to see a gun in Kirika's hands, but tells her it's okay. That evening, Kirika throws her painting supplies into the Seine, while Mireille gets a tip where Galle is. Kirika and Mireille then find and kill Galle. The episode ends with Kirika looking out the window at dawn, while Mireille laments to Kirika that she had warned her that this would happen if she continued to see Milosh.
14	"A Bouquet of Flowers for Mireille"; Transliteration: "Mireiyu ni Hanataba o" (Japanese: ミレイユに花束を)	July 6, 2001
Claude Feyder, Mireille's uncle, returns to Paris after many years of living elsewhere. Mireille is quite happy to see him again as he is her only living relative. Feyder escaped from Corsica with Mireille and raised her after the murder of her parents. At his mansion, Feyder reveals to Mireille than he is working for Les Soldats and that he is assigned to kill Kirika. He then asks Mireille to bring Kirika to his mansion so that he can carry out his assignment. Mireille returns to the mansion with Kirika. Mireille finds Feyder and shoots him, while Kirika encounters two other men working for Les Soldats and kills them cleverly. Mireille and Kirika depart from the mansion, making their way back to the apartment.
15	"The Cold-Blooded Killer Act 1"; Transliteration: "Reigan Sasshu acte I" (Japanese: 冷眼殺手 acte I)	July 13, 2001
Shortly after Claude's death, Mireille and Kirika return to their apartment and sense that someone else had been there earlier. They find a contract signed by Les Soldats. Les Soldats want them to kill a Triad boss in Taiwan. In Taipei, Mireille and Kirika encounter Shaoli, the "Cold-Blooded Killer". The Triads hired Shaoli to deal with any threat posed by Noir or Les Soldats. Chloe arrives in Taipei to help Mireille and Kirika.
16	"The Cold-Blooded Killer Act 2"; Transliteration: "Reigan Sasshu acte II" (Japanese: 冷眼殺手 acte II)	July 20, 2001
Mireille and Kirika meets with Les Soldats' messenger, but their meeting is cut short by Shaoli and the Triads. The Triads capture Mireille and intend to use her as bait to trap Kirika. However, Kirika and Chloe overwhelm the Triads, though Shaoli escapes. Mireille and Kirika assassinate the Triad boss. Elsewhere, Shaoli kills a man who had been playing Les Soldats and the Triads against each other at China's bidding. Mireille and Kirika's search for Shaoli leads them to an old warehouse in Taipei, where they witness a meeting between Shaoli and Chloe. Shaoli says that the death of the double agent was her gift to Les Soldats, but Chloe says that Les Soldats have no use for her. Infuriated, Shaoli tries to kill Chloe, but Chloe is much too fast for Shaoli.
17	"Return to Corsica"; Transliteration: "Korushika ni Kaeru" (Japanese: コルシカに還る)	July 27, 2001
Mireille decides to return to her homeland island, Corsica -- the place of her family's murder. Mireille encounters her mother's maid, Mary, who initially mistakes her for Odette due to Mireille's strong resemblance to her mother. Mireille also meets Mary's husband, Victor, who is terrified to see the Bouquets' daughter. Some men in suits escort Mireille to Bertonie, the man who took over Laurent Bouquet's business interests. Bertonie tells Mireille that she should look for George Madelin, her father's right-hand man, to find out what really happened all those years ago. Mireille finds Madelin in a bar and manages to convince him to tell her what he knows. They later meet in a garden, where he tells her that her parents were members of Les Soldats. Before Madelin can offer more information, though, a sniper shoots him. Before he dies, Madelin tells Mireille that her parents died because they tried to protect her. Mireille pursues the sniper into her family's abandoned home, but Chloe is the one who manages to kill him. Chloe tells Mireille that Kirika is the True Noir, just like Chloe. She goes on to say that Mireille should not prevent Kirika from finding out her real identity.
18	"The Darkness Within Me"; Transliteration: "Watashi no Yami" (Japanese: 私の闇)	August 3, 2001
The episode begins with Mireille and Kirika shooting at targets in underground sewers. Disturbed by what Chloe told her, Mireille asks Kirika to leave her alone for a while. Kirika wanders around Paris by herself until a member of Les Soldats asks her to join him in his car. This man tells Kirika about "Le Grand Retour" ("The Great Return"), Altena's plan to reintroduce Noir into Les Soldats' hierarchy and operations. This man also tells Kirika that he and others disagree with Altena's vision. This man has a book with additional information about Les Soldats and Noir, and he sets up another meeting with Kirika. However, Chloe tells Kirika that someone will try to kill Mireille at the same time as Kirika's meeting with the man, so Kirika has to choose between getting the book or saving her friend. Kirika decides to find Mireille instead of obtaining the book.
19	"Two Hands of the Soldats"; Transliteration: "Soruda no Ryōte" (Japanese: ソルダの両手)	August 10, 2001
Mireille and Kirika continue to look for the mysterious book associated with Les Soldats. They meet with a rare books expert, who tells them that there should be a third copy of the Langonel Manuscript; the first two were burned during World War II. Mireille and Kirika learn that Casper Edlinger, a multimillionaire, possesses the third copy. They arrange a meeting with him but discover that his copy was also destroyed in a fire. Mireille and Kirika then encounter Chloe, who recites a passage from the Langonel Manuscript and explains the true meaning of "Noir". The three soon are ambushed by low-ranking members of Les Soldats but defeat them rather easily. Chloe reveals to Kirika that she was born and raised to be assassin. Chloe attempts to perform a ritual with Kirika, but Mireille stops them.
20	"The Sin Within the Sin"; Transliteration: "Tsumi no Naka no Tsumi" (Japanese: 罪の中の罪)	August 17, 2001
Chloe returns to the Manor. Altena and Chloe enjoy supper together. Later, Altena reads from the Langonel Manuscript to Chloe as a bedtime story. Altena then gives her a mission to explain everything to Mireille and Kirika. Meanwhile, high-ranking members of Les Soldats who oppose Altena's plans decide to kill Mireille and Kirika. They order an attack on Mireille's apartment in Paris. After Mireille and Kirika defeat this wave of attackers, Chloe arrives on the scene. Kirika gives her gun to Chloe. Chloe shoots Kirika, triggering the latter's memories.
21	"Morning Without Dawn"; Transliteration: "Mumyō no Asa" (Japanese: 無明の朝)	August 24, 2001
Flashbacks reveal that Kirika killed Mireille's parents and little brother. Chloe witnessed this event. Back in the present, Kirika runs away from Mireille and Chloe rather than listening to Chloe talk about the past. More low-ranking Soldats attack Kirika in a cemetery, but she defeats them just as easily as she had previously. Mireille finds Kirika, and Kirika tries to persuade Mireille to kill her as she had promised back in Japan. Mireille points her gun at Kirika, but she eventually walks away.
22	"Journey's End"; Transliteration: "Tabiji no Hate" (Japanese: 旅路の果て)	August 31, 2001
Kirika wakes up in a rural village. Apparently, she traveled there while in a daze or trance. The village's inhabitants tell her that they anticipated her arrival. The villagers are allied with Altena and fight Soldats who come to prevent Kirika from entering the Manor. However, once again, Kirika is simply too skilled to be stopped by ordinary men.
23	"Sentiments for the Remaining Flower"; Transliteration: "Zanka Ujō" (Japanese: 残花有情)	September 7, 2001
With Kirika gone, Mireille returns to the underground sewer where she engages in target practice. Remy Breffort, a high-ranking Soldat, attempts to recruit her to join his faction in opposition to Altena. Mireille would have more power and influence than her parents did back in Corsica. Back at her now heavily-damaged apartment, Mireille finds a letter under her plant by the window. Kirika wrote the letter, expressing her gratitude for Mireille's help and friendship. Mireille is overwhelmed by Kirika's sentiments and her own emotions. She meets again with Breffort, this time to reject his solicitations and to tell him that she will go to the Manor to save Kirika, not to get involved in Les Soldats' affairs. Meanwhile, Kirika reaches the Manor, where Altena welcomes her "home".
24	"Dark Return"; Transliteration: "Ankoku Kaiki" (Japanese: 暗黒回帰)	September 14, 2001
Altena explains to Kirika her purpose in life as an assassin, while Chloe explains to her the lifestyle at the Manor. The following day, Borne and Marennes, two of Altena's most important followers, arrive for the Noir revival ritual. Kirika and Chloe train with swords; Kirika breaks Chloe's sword even though Chloe has had extensive experience with such weaponry. After they take a bath, Chloe shows Kirika the olive fork that she took after their "tea party". Later, Altena hands Kirika her gun, which reminds Kirika of when Altena first gave her that gun before she went on her mission to kill the Bouquets. Kirika points the gun at Altena, but Altena convinces Kirika that Noir can have a positive impact on society.
25	"The Depth of Hell's Fire"; Transliteration: "Gōka no Fuchi" (Japanese: 業火の淵)	September 21, 2001
Mireille arrives at the Manor to retrieve Kirika. Mireille sees Kirika and Chloe together, at which point Kirika shoots her gun at Mireille. Mireille and Kirika battle among the Manor's ruins. At one point, Mireille tosses her father's watch into the air, possibly to distract Kirika. When the watch hits the ground, the familiar tune plays, triggering Kirika's memories of Mireille's family. Chloe intercedes because she wants Kirika to be able to complete the Noir ritual with her. However, as Chloe attempts to kill Mireille with a knife, Kirika saves Mireille by killing Chloe with the olive fork.
26	"Birth"; Transliteration: "Tanjō" (Japanese: 誕生)	September 28, 2001
Borne tells Altena that Kirika and Mireille have killed Chloe. Mireille and Kirika proceed to the main building and fight many priestesses, including Marennes. Altena's response to Borne is that the Noir ritual can still be completed since two of the saplings survived. Borne calls Altena a traitor and draws her gun, but Altena shoots Borne before the latter can fire her weapon. Later, Altena leads Mireille and Kirika to the main building's basement, where there is a volcano pit. Altena goads Mireille into killing her, but Mireille says that Altena does not even deserve death. Altena injures Mireille by shooting her and then tries to convince Kirika to kill her. When Kirika also refuses, Altena aims her gun at Mireille again, this time with intent to kill. However, Kirika jumps in the way because she remembers Odette Bouquet's entreaty to her to protect Mireille. Kirika then charges at Altena, and they both fall into the pit. Mireille runs to the pit and finds Altena clinging to the ledge with her free hand holding Kirika. Altena raises Kirika within Mireille's reach and then drops into the lava. Mireille and Kirika walk past Breffort and his Soldats colleagues as they leave the Manor. The series ends with a camera pan over the broken watch and two gunshots are heard (the first from Kirika's Beretta M1934, the second from Mireille's Walther P99).

== Releases ==
Japanese VHS and Region 2 DVD releases by Victor Entertainment
Volume	Episodes	Release date	Ref.
Noir: Vol. 1	1–2	July 25, 2001	
Noir: Vol. 2	3–4	August 22, 2001	
Noir: Vol. 3	5–6	September 21, 2001	
Noir: Vol. 4	7–8	October 24, 2001	
Noir: Vol. 5	9–10	October 24, 2001	
Noir: Vol. 6	11–12	November 21, 2001	
Noir: Vol. 7	13–14	November 21, 2001	
Noir: Vol. 8	15–16	December 19, 2001	
Noir: Vol. 9	17–18	January 23, 2002	
Noir: Vol. 10	19–20	January 23, 2002	
Noir: Vol. 11	21–22	February 21, 2002	
Noir: Vol. 12	23–24	February 21, 2002	
Noir: Vol. 13	25–26	March 21, 2002	

English and Japanese Region 1 DVD releases by ADV Films
Volume	Episodes	OCLC	Release date	Ref.
Noir: Shades of Darkness	1–5	OCLC 99807560	February 18, 2003	
Noir: The Hit List	6–9	OCLC 99813075	April 8, 2003	
Noir: The Firing Chamber	10–12	OCLC 99816397	May 13, 2003	
Noir: Death Warrant	13–16	OCLC 52850346	June 24, 2003	
Noir: Terminal Velocity	17–19	OCLC 54530836	August 5, 2003	
Noir: Cloaks and Daggers	20–23	OCLC 54530917	September 16, 2003	
Noir: The End of the Matter	24–26	OCLC 53959191	October 28, 2003	
Noir: Animini Volume 1	1	NA	June 15, 2004	
Noir: Animini Volume 2	2	NA	August 3, 2004	
