= Shigeru Kitayama =

Japanese anime producer

Shigeru Kitayama (北山 茂, Kitayama Shigeru) is a Japanese anime producer. Some of his major works include Yasuhiro Nightow's Trigun television series as well as Nightow's other series Gungrave. He has worked on Shinichi Watanabe's adaptation of Excel Saga and the Geobreeders OVA series. He worked with Koichi Mashimo of Bee Train on producing what would later be known as the "girls with guns" series starting with Noir in 2001, then Madlax in 2004, and finally El Cazador de la Bruja in 2007. In 2010 he attended Anime Expo to watch the premiere of Trigun: Badlands Rumble.

== Works ==
Staffed in

- Ninja Scroll (1993 film), Assistant producer
- 801 T.T.S. Airbats (1994 OVA series), Producer
- Trigun (1998 TV series), Producer
- Geobreeders (1998 OVA series), Producer
- Excel Saga (1999 TV series), Producer
- Geobreeders 2 (2000 OVA series), Producer
- Noir (2001 TV series), Producer
- Aquarian Age: Sign for Evolution (2002 TV series), Producer
- Gungrave (2003 TV series), Producer, Soundtrack Executive Producer
- Madlax (2004 TV series), Producer, Soundtrack Supervisor
- El Cazador de la Bruja (2007 TV series), Producer
- Trigun: Badlands Rumble (2010 Movie), Producer

Cast in

- Puni Puni Poemy (2001 OVA series), Producer Kitayama

Mentioned

- 旅する少女と灼熱の国, worked with the author
