= Trigun (1998 TV series) =

Japanese anime television series

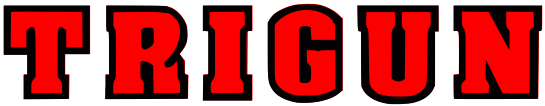
- Type: TV series
- Genre: Space Western
- Based on: Trigun
- Created by: Yasuhiro Nightow
- Directed by: Satoshi Nishimura
- Series composition: Yōsuke Kuroda
- Character designer: Takahiro Yoshimatsu
- Music by: Tsuneo Imahori
- Opening theme: "H.T." by Tsuneo Imahori
- Ending themes: "Kaze wa Mirai ni Fuku" (風は未来に吹く) by Akima & Neos
- No. of episodes: 26

Production
- Art director: Hidetoshi Kaneko
- Sound director: Yasunori Honda
- Cinematographer: Hisao Shirai
- Color designer: Akihiko Isozaki
- Animation producer: Masao Morosawa
- Studio: Madhouse
- Producer: Shigeru Kitayama
- Production company: Victor Entertainment
- Runtime: 24 minutes

Original release
- Network: TXN (TV Tokyo)
- Release: April 2 – October 1, 1998

Related
- Trigun: Badlands Rumble (2010)

Trigun is a Japanese anime television series based on Yasuhiro Nightow's manga series Trigun. It was directed by Satoshi Nishimura at Madhouse, with Yōsuke Kuroda handling series composition. It aired for 26 episodes on TV Tokyo between April and October 1998. Set on the fictional planet known as No Man's Land, the plot follows Vash the Stampede, a renowned gunman who is constantly fighting bounty hunters seeking the immense bounty on his head. Despite adapting the source material, the anime's story differs in the second half because Nightow was still writing the manga at that point.

The series has been praised for its story and main character. However, some critics have found the animation quality of certain episodes to be lacking.

== Premise ==
The series follows Vash the Stampede, the most feared outlaw on the planet, who has a $$60 billion ("double dollar") price on his head. He displays a kindhearted, goofy demeanor and goes out of his way not to hurt anyone if he can help it. Most of the destruction blamed on him is actually caused by the extreme measures people take to capture or kill him for the reward; as a result, he has been nicknamed "The Humanoid Typhoon." As he travels across the planet to meet a certain man, he also meets two women, Meryl Stryfe and Milly Thompson, tasked with investigating his actions and minimizing the damage associated with them. as Meryl realizes that Vash is the true feared man despite his cheerful personality, the episodes following them explore more the character's depth with the inclusion of the priest and gunner Nicholas D. Wolfwood as well as an inclusion of antagonists, the Gung-ho Guns, meant to torture Vash. The Gung-ho Guns are led by a man known as Knives whose identity is explored in Vash's backstory.

== Production ==
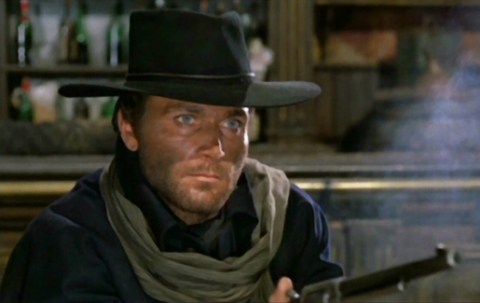
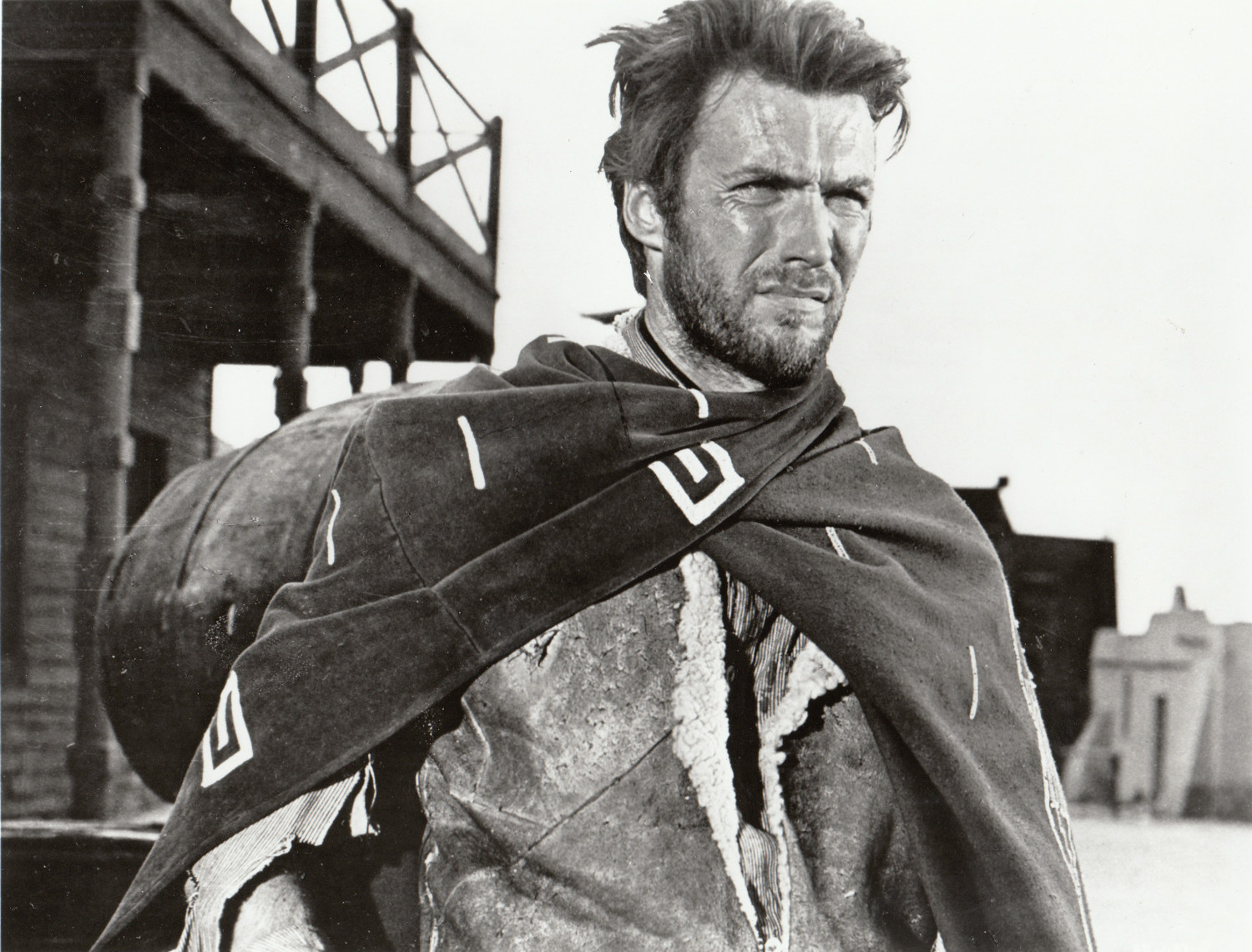
Multiple Wild West films inspired the anime, including Django (1966) and Clint Eastwood's work in A Fistful of Dollars (1964)

The anime was directed by Satoshi Nishimura at Madhouse, with Yōsuke Kuroda handling series composition, Takahiro Yoshimatsu providing character designs, and music composed by Tsuneo Imahori. After assisting studio Madhouse with the first anime adaptation, Nightow considered the work faithful to the manga and credited it with helping him properly serialize the story. The concept for Maximum arose when animators from Madhouse contacted him about producing such an adaptation. This led Nightow to create several of Knives' allies that were never used in the manga. Character designer Yoshimatsu Takahiro described the series as steampunk and expressed appreciation for Vash's pacifist values. He found Nightow helpful, though he noted that original manga authors could sometimes be demanding when their works were adapted.

To build suspense, writer Yōsuke Kuroda proposed that Vash not fire a bullet until the fifth episode, at which point Meryl realized he was the renowned gunman. From there, Madhouse gradually reduced the initial comedic tone of the anime in favor of developing more dramatic storylines, portraying Vash as a more responsible gunman who openly fought to protect the weak. With episode nine, the series shifted again following the introduction of Nicholas D. Wolfwood, who was written as both Vash's ally and rival, allowing the anime to explore more significant themes. However, Kuroda wanted Trigun to avoid philosophical pretensions and instead embrace a cheesy tone.

== Release ==
The series was originally broadcast on TV Tokyo from April 2 to October 1, 1998. (Note: TV Tokyo listed Trigun air dates on Wednesday at 25:15, which is effectively Thursday at 1:15 a.m. JST.) The opening theme is "H.T.", written and arranged by Tsuneo Imahori, while the ending is "Kaze wa Mirai ni Fuku" (風は未来に吹く; lit. 'Wind Blows to the Future'), written, composed, arranged, and performed by Akima & Neos. The episodes were collected in thirteen VHS cassettes, labeled as "Stages", from August 5, 1998, to August 4, 1999.

In North America, the series was first licensed by Pioneer Entertainment (later Geneon USA) in 1999. Eight DVDs were released from March 28, 2000, to May 29, 2001. A box set containing all the episodes was released on November 20, 2001. The series premiered on Cartoon Network's Adult Swim programming block on March 31, 2003. The series also premiered in Canada on G4techTV's Anime Current programming block in 2007. In the same year, Geneon announced that they would cease their in-house distribution. In 2008, Funimation announced that they had signed a deal with Geneon to distribute "select" titles from the company; in 2010, they announced that they had licensed Trigun for a DVD and Blu-ray Disc home video release, and launched it on October 26, 2010. Following the announcement that Funimation would be unified under the Crunchyroll brand, the series began streaming on the platform in May 2022.

== Episodes ==
No.	Title	Directed by	Written by	Original release date	English air date
1	"The $$60 Billion Man"; Transliteration: "Roppyaku-oku Dabudoru no Otoko" (Japanese: 600億$$の男)	Satoshi Nishimura	Yōsuke Kuroda	April 2, 1998	March 31, 2003
After a "Humanoid Typhoon" incident leaves the town of Dankin in ruins, a gang of thugs led by the giant part-cyborg Bad Boss tracks down Vash the Stampede in hopes of collecting the $$60 billion reward for his capture. At the same time, Meryl Stryfe and Milly Thompson, employees of the Bernardelli Insurance Society, are sent to investigate the rumors surrounding Vash and keep him from doing any damage that might affect the company's finances. Bad Boss and a bounty hunter named Loose Ruth mistake each other for Vash in the rocks above the town of Felnarl. Vash, Meryl, and Milly are caught in the middle of the shoot-out but manage to escape, while Felnarl suffers heavy damage but no casualties. At Lewison Town, 40 iles west of Felnarl, Meryl files her report.
2	"Truth of Mistake"	Shigeki Awai	Yōsuke Kuroda	April 9, 1998	April 1, 2003
Arriving in a town whose water supply has dried up, Meryl and Milly find Vash working for Cliff Cesar, a wealthy water seller. Cliff has hired Vash to protect a young woman named Maryann staying at his mansion, and is worried about someone who has been trespassing on his property. Vash, Meryl, and Milly discover that the intruder is actually Maryann, a marshal who is investigating Cliff's business and his monopolization of the water supply. Vash sides with Maryann and foils Cliff's attempts to kill them both, which inadvertently cause Cliff's processing equipment to overload, destroying his mansion, releasing his stored water, and flooding the town. Maryann places Cliff under arrest, but no-one actually believes the man hired by Cliff is really Vash.
3	"Peace Maker"	Shigehito Takayanagi	Yōsuke Kuroda	April 16, 1998	April 2, 2003
In the city of Warrens, Vash encounters Frank Marlon, a drunkard who used to be a talented gunsmith. He once saved the town from a group of bandits by arming the residents, but fell into alcoholism after one of his guns was used to kill his family in a bank robbery. Lacking a sheriff, Warrens is defenseless against a gang who plan to rob an armored car until Vash inspires Frank and the residents to stand up against them. The robbery is thwarted without any injuries, and Frank gives up drinking and repairs Vash's gun in gratitude.
4	"Love & Peace"	Toshikatsu Tokoro	Yōsuke Kuroda	April 23, 1998	April 3, 2003
In the city of Orleans, Meryl, Milly, and a young heiress named Stefany Bostalk are taken hostage in a saloon by a gang who have a score to settle with Stefany's father and the town leader, nicknamed "Grim Reaper." They want revenge on Bostalk for slaughtering their parents and seizing their land years earlier. Vash waltzes into the saloon, and is also taken hostage. The situation worsens when Stan, the local sheriff and formerly one of Bostalk's raiders, hires a group of ruthless mercenaries to storm the saloon. The confrontation culminates in a showdown between Bostalk and the gang leader, in which Bostalk sustains a shoulder wound. Stan tries to kill the leader in a ploy to boost his own reputation, but Vash and Meryl disarm him and his deputies, and Meryl strips him of his position.
5	"Hard Puncher"	Yoshimitsu Ohashi	Yōsuke Kuroda	April 30, 1998	April 7, 2003
In the city of Inepril, Vash finds its entire population trying to capture him for the $$60 billion reward so they can pay for much-needed repairs to their malfunctioning plant. The citizens cause extensive damage in their pursuit, and the town leader hires the escaped outlaws Professor and Gofsef Nebraska to catch Vash and stop the destruction. Vash puts himself in great peril to keep the violent pair from harming any civilians, and ultimately stops Gofsef's huge mechanical fist by shooting it. As the Nebraskas are recaptured, Meryl finally admits to her dismay that the strange man she and Milly have been following may really be Vash the Stampede.
6	"Lost July"	Nanako Shimazaki	Yōsuke Kuroda	May 7, 1998	April 8, 2003
Vash allows the citizens of Inepril to claim a $$700,000 reward for capturing the Nebraskas, enough money to cover repairs to the city's plant. An engineering team arrives on a sand steamer, and Vash becomes smitten with Elizabeth, their beautiful manager. She engages him to protect her, but then takes him into a room in the plant filled with overloading equipment and locks them in, where he is attacked by a blade-wielding masked assassin with long braided hair. She intends to kill Vash, accusing him of destroying the third city of July. She blames him for the way the survivors descended into chaos and violence, leaving her an orphan when she was three years old. Vash uses his powers to bring the plant under control, telling her that he has no memory of the day. She breaks down, crying as she remembers him comforting her as a child.
7	"B.D.N. (Brilliant Dynamite Neon)"; Transliteration: "Buririanto Dainamaito Neon" (Japanese: B.D.N. ブリリアント·ダイナマイト·ネオン)	Mihiro Yamaguchi	Yōsuke Kuroda	May 14, 1998	April 9, 2003
Vash departs on the sand steamer with the gratitude of Inepril, while Meryl and Milly take jobs on board to keep an eye on him and save money. He befriends a young stowaway named Kaite, who is secretly helping the ruthless Bad Lad Gang hijack the steamer. Dissatisfied with the haul, their leader, Brilliant Dynamites Neon, decides to crash the steamer into the bottom of a canyon to smash open the safe containing the passengers' valuables. Kaite refuses to help with this plan, claiming that the craft was his father's, and Vash saves him from being killed by the short-tempered Neon.
8	"And Between the Wasteland and Sky..."; Transliteration: "Soshite Kouya to Sora no Aida wo" (Japanese: そして荒野と空の間を)	Kou Matsuo	Yōsuke Kuroda	May 21, 1998	April 10, 2003
Kaite reveals that his father designed the steamer, and while he helps Vash evade the Bad Lads, he sees the lengths to which Vash will go in order to avoid harming anyone, even after he is wounded. The gang eventually capture Vash and Kaite, but as Neon prepares to kill him, Meryl and Milly, having disguised themselves as gang members, hold him at gunpoint. Vash challenges Neon to a duel and wins, so Neon agrees to stop the steamer, but the braking system no longer functions. To atone for his part in the hijacking, Kaite rushes into the engine room and trips an emergency stop switch when the crew cannot do it. Even with his protective clothing, he is badly burned, but the steamer stops just short of the canyon's edge thanks to his efforts and Neon's surprising use of his own getaway vehicle to force it to a halt. While watching the sun rise, Kaite starts singing a song that causes Vash to have a flashback of a long-haired woman from his past.
9	"Murder Machine"	Shigeki Awai	Yōsuke Kuroda	May 28, 1998	April 14, 2003
While traveling to May City by bus from the site of the steamer crash, Vash encounters a traveling priest named Nicholas D. Wolfwood, who is trying to raise money for an orphanage he supports. The bus is attacked by a squadron of armed robots, remnants of lost technology, and the two men leap into action to save a little girl being menaced by them. In the process, Vash and Wolfwood are sucked down through a patch of quicksand and fall into a buried alien ship which is controlling the robots. Working together, they fight their way past its defenses and shut down the main computer to save the passengers from further attack. The bus safely reaches May City the next morning.
10	"Quick Draw"	Shoji Yabushita	Yōsuke Kuroda	June 11, 1998	April 15, 2003
In May City, Vash finds Wolfwood helping out at a restaurant owned by a woman whose husband has gone missing and left her and her son deep in debt. Wolfwood persuades Vash to sign up for a quick-draw tournament with a $$50,000 grand prize as a way to help her out, and then Vash shocks Wolfwood by signing him up as well. The two devise a scheme to fake their deaths in the final round, wounding but not killing all the gunmen the organizer hired to capture Vash for the bounty on his head. Wolfwood coerces the double-dealing tournament organizer into giving him the prize money. The restaurant owner is happy to have her debts paid off and surprised when her husband returns home.
11	"Escape from Pain"	Yoshihide Kuriyama	Yōsuke Kuroda	June 18, 1998	April 16, 2003
While traveling across the desert with a vehicle caravan, Milly and Wolfwood encounter Julius and Moore, a pair of lovers on the run. Julius, the "son" of the caravan company's owner, has learned that the company engages in human trafficking with his real father, the mayor of Fondrique. To the horror of Meryl and Milly, Vash accepts a $$20 million contract to kill Julius and keep the company in business. Wolfwood reasons that Julius should return to the caravan because people's livelihoods are in danger, a higher priority than the young man's own wellbeing. Vash appears and shoots both Julius and Moore from a distance, convincing everyone that they are dead. However, he actually used rubber bullets so the couple could escape together. The owner later sends his apologies to Julius, also saying that he and Moore are free. Wolfwood parts ways with Vash, Meryl, and Milly, reflecting that Vash devised a solution that he himself could not see.
12	"Diablo"	Hideo Hayashi	Yōsuke Kuroda	June 25, 1998	April 17, 2003
A peaceful day in town for Vash, Meryl, and Milly is ruined when the powerful telepath Legato Bluesummers, commander of the Gung-Ho Guns, arrives and warns Vash that he will die that day. Vash is subsequently arrested for the murder of a shoemaker and jailed to await trial. As Vash ponders Legato's message that night in jail, Monev the Gale storms in to kill him. Monev has spent twenty years training in isolation to become the perfect killer. However, Vash escapes and eventually defeats Monev after a protracted battle that leaves many townspeople dead by Monev's hand. Vash holds Monev at gunpoint, ready to kill him, but then suffers a crisis of conscience.
13	"Vash the Stampede"; Transliteration: "Vasshu Za Sutanpīdo" (Japanese: ヴァッシュ·ザ·スタンピード)	Shigehito Takayanagi	Yōsuke Kuroda	July 2, 1998	April 21, 2003
Vash chooses to spare Monev, who admits that he has no idea who sent him to kill Vash. The townspeople remain on edge as Meryl composes a report for her Bernardelli superiors, told mostly through flashbacks to previous episodes. She summarizes the experiences she and Milly have had with Vash while accompanying him on his travels. They see the multiple scars he has received as a result of his choice to live without killing anyone, and he says that he is on a quest to put his past behind him. When he leaves town, no longer facing a murder charge for the shoemaker's death, Meryl and Milly decide to continue following him.
14	"Little Arcadia"	Shigeki Awai	Yōsuke Kuroda	July 9, 1998	April 22, 2003
In the town of Promontory, Vash, Meryl, and Milly are drawn into a dispute over a valuable piece of land. The elderly owners are trying to stop the ruthless tycoon Morgan from forcing them off. Morgan has hired a gang of thugs to take the land, including the couple's son Badwick and Patricia Nebraska with the rest of the Nebraska family. Meryl and Milly foil the thugs with a little secret help from Vash. Badwick comes to understand his parents' determination to hold on to their livelihood and heads into town to file the paperwork that will make their ownership of the land official. To his surprise, he finds that his parents are planning to give the land to him.
15	"Demon's Eye"	Tomio Yamauchi	Yōsuke Kuroda	July 16, 1998	April 23, 2003
In the town of Jeneora Rock, Legato is insulted by a gang known as the Roderick Thieves and takes out his annoyance by forcing them to brutally kill each other. Vash arrives and is horrified to discover the gang's corpses. He chases Legato, but instead comes face to face with a member of his Gung-Ho Guns, the gunfighter called Dominique the Cyclops. She can seemingly move from place to place in an instant, but as the two fight, Vash figures out how to neutralize her powers and gains the upper hand. However, they are interrupted by Meryl and Milly, and Dominique escapes in the confusion. Vash warns the girls not to follow him any further, and quietly vows to hunt down Legato, whatever it takes.
16	"Fifth Moon"	Yoshihide Kuriyama	Yōsuke Kuroda	July 23, 1998	April 24, 2003
Two weeks after the Jeneora Rock incident, Meryl and Milly decide to follow Vash. Meanwhile, 40 miles from the city of Augusta, a hypnotized man tells Vash the Legato awaits him in the city before killing himself. On arriving in Augusta, Vash uses his reputation to create a panic and evacuate the city so he can face Legato alone. Legato sends two Gung-Ho Guns after Vash; first, the spike-throwing E.G. Mine, who is easily beaten and summarily killed by the second, the samurai Rai-Dei the Blade. As Rai-Dei corners Vash and prepares to kill him, Vash's right arm transforms into an organic cannon, or "angel arm," whose blast destroys Augusta and carves a crater into one of the planet's moons. Wolfwood has also followed Vash, and when he finds the wounded Rai-Dei in the rubble, he kills him. News of Vash's destruction travels across the planet, and Meryl and Milly, who witnessed it all from a distance, receive orders to return to headquarters, as Bernardelli has decided to no longer be involved with Vash after designating the event as "mankind's first human Act of God".
17	"Rem Saverem"; Transliteration: "Remu Seiburemu" (Japanese: レム·セイブレム)	Yoshimitsu Ohashi	Yōsuke Kuroda	July 30, 1998	April 28, 2003
This episode is set during the childhood of Vash and his brother Knives, who were taken aboard a spaceship by its small crew, one part of a large fleet containing humans in suspended animation. They departed Earth as part of Project SEEDS, an effort to colonize other planets after mankind had exhausted its resources. Vash becomes attached to one optimistic crew member named Rem Saverem. However, Knives becomes increasingly disgusted with the behavior of humanity, especially after being beaten by a crew member who distrusts the alien boys. Knives manipulates three crew members into killing each other, then kills the captain and alters the ships' navigation program to make them crash onto the planet. Rem sacrifices her life to reprogram the ships and save as many colonists as she can, urging Vash to "take care of Knives!" 107 years later, as the adult Vash travels to the city of July, he vows to Rem that indeed, he'll take care of Knives.
18	"Goodbye for Now"; Transliteration: "Ima wa, Sayonara" (Japanese: 今は, さよなら)	Shigeki Awai	Yōsuke Kuroda	August 6, 1998	April 29, 2003
Vash has a nightmare in which he recalls when Knives manifested Vash's "angel arm", and provoke him into firing it, destroying July city. Wolfwood arrives in the city of Kasted, which has been overrun by a bandit gang who the townspeople believe is Vash. A man named Eriks intervenes to save a young girl named Lina from the leader's wrath, but he is shot and is rushed to the hospital. Wolfwood recognizes Eriks as Vash, who changed his name after the destruction of Augusta and has settled into a peaceful life with Lina and her grandmother Sheryl. He tells Vash that Knives is implicated in the disappearance of the entire population of the town of Carcasses. When the gang kidnaps Lina, Vash reluctantly takes up his gun and his old identity and accompanies Wolfwood, easily rescuing her. Afterwards, Vash reluctantly departs Kasted to investigate Knives' possible involvement in the situation in Carcasses.
19	"Hang Fire"	Tomio Yamauchi	Yōsuke Kuroda	August 13, 1998	April 30, 2003
When Vash is sighted at Little Jersey, Meryl and Milly are assigned to prevent any destruction, but they arrive too late, finding the town in ruins. Vash and Wolfwood arrive in the city of New Oregon, the site of a long-running feud between the Polo and Fris families. A Fris contingent hijacks the sand steamer carrying Meryl and Milly to New Oregon, and crashes it into the town. Vash makes his way onto the steamer and broadcasts a message over the PA system to scare off the Fris family, who are holding the passengers hostage, while Benson Fris is ready to kill Slader Polo in revenge for the death of his daughter. Benson savagely beats Vash, but he ultimately yields to Vash's pleas to spare Slader and the standoff ends without any loss of life. The Fris leader proves to be a mannequin controlled by one of the Gung-Ho Guns, Leonof the Puppet-Master, who reports to Legato that Vash is once again on the move.
20	"Flying Ship"	Yuji Moriyama	Yōsuke Kuroda	August 20, 1998	May 1, 2003
Typhoon Jacqueline hits New Oregon, forcing everyone to stay indoors. Vash recalls the moments after the Project SEEDS fleet crashed on the planet, and his anger at Knives, who sabotaged the mission in an attempt to kill the colonists. Vash rides the typhoon's winds up to an ageing SEEDS ship that has remained in orbit since the fleet arrived, and Wolfwood tags along. It has been 5 years since Vash's last visit. The ship's inhabitants regard the visitors with distrust, except the Doctor and the young woman Jessica, who has had a crush on Vash since she was a child. Things take a turn for the worse when Legato has Leonof send his puppets to kill as many inhabitants as possible, and they take Jessica hostage. Vash and Wolfwood free her and shoot down the puppets, but Leonof announces that three "demons" have been sent to destroy him.
21	"Out of Time"	Yoshihide Kuriyama	Yōsuke Kuroda	August 27, 1998	May 5, 2003
Two more Gung-Ho Guns enter the SEEDS ship and begin killing the residents: Gray the Ninelives, a heavily armed and armored android, and Hoppered the Gauntlet, a hunchback with a machine gun and invulnerable shield. Vash and Wolfwood fight through hordes of Leonof's puppets to stop the Gung-Ho Guns from destroying the ship's plants. Their efforts fail and the plant is destroyed, causing the broken ship to descend onto the planet. Wolfwood discovers the real Jessica tied up in a closet, and realizes that the one he and Vash saved is a puppet. It draws a gun and fatally shoots Brad, a resident who had become Vash's friend. Meanwhile, Wolfwood finds and kills Leonof in the desert, and Meryl and Milly arrive on the scene.
22	"Alternative"	Shigeki Awai	Yōsuke Kuroda	September 3, 1998	May 6, 2003
Following the many deaths on the SEEDS ship, Vash realizes he must face Knives, so he travels on with Wolfwood, Meryl, and Milly. They arrive at the city of Keybas, built in the ruins of a SEEDS ship, but the guards will not let in outsiders. The group follows a child to an orphanage built into a rockface and filled with children from nearby towns which the adults have inexplicably abandoned. The next morning, after a nighttime visit from the Gung-Ho Guns, a mob from Keybas attacks, blaming the group for opening the main gates and the death of a guard. They are interrupted by a swarm of giant sandworms that attack and begin to destroy the city. Vash and Wolfwood suspect that the worms are being controlled, and Vash realizes that an orphan boy named Bete is responsible. After Vash destroys his control device, the child admits to being Zazie the Beast, one of the Gung-Ho Guns. He holds the group at gunpoint until Wolfwood shoots and kills him. Everyone is horrified by this, but Wolfwood argues that it was necessary for their survival.
23	"Paradise"; Transliteration: "Rakuen" (Japanese: 楽園)	Norihiko Nagahama	Yōsuke Kuroda	September 10, 1998	May 7, 2003
In the town of Tonim, Wolfwood reflects on his troubled childhood, but is interrupted by the arrival of his mentor, Chapel the Evergreen of the Gung-Ho Guns. Chapel informs him that Knives' order to keep Vash alive has been rescinded and that he must now kill Vash instead. On doing so, he will inherit Chapel's position in the Gung-Ho Guns and be able to protect the children in his orphanage in the town of December. Wolfwood and Vash resume their old argument over the use of deadly force, but another Gung-Ho Gun, Caine the Longshot, begins shooting at them from the desert with a huge sniper rifle. Wolfwood sends Vash after Caine, planning to fight Chapel himself. Caine commits suicide after Vash destroys his rifle, and although Wolfwood beats Chapel, his body is taken over by Legato and is forced to shoot Wolfwood. Fatally wounded, Wolfwood tells Vash that Knives is in Dimitri and then staggers into a church. There, his last act is to apologize for his sins before he dies, leaving Meryl and especially Milly devastated.
24	"Sin"; Transliteration: "Tsumi" (Japanese: 罪)	Kazuhiro Ozawa	Yōsuke Kuroda	September 17, 1998	May 8, 2003
Chapel tries to kill Legato in revenge for using him to kill Wolfwood, but Legato immobilizes him and leaves him to be disintegrated by Knives. Vash departs Tonim in search of Knives, telling Meryl that Knives is his brother and warning her and Milly not to follow him for their safety. He finds Legato in the town of LR, but first has to fight the last remaining Gung-Ho Gun, Midvalley the Hornfreak, who can send out devastating shock waves from his saxophone. After Vash damages the horn with ricochets to render it useless, Midvalley commits suicide. Vash approaches Legato, who tries to trigger Vash's angel arm, but Vash brings it under control and refuses to kill him. However, Meryl and Milly have followed Vash to LR, where they are captured by a mob of townspeople under Legato's control. Legato forces Vash to kill him in order to save the lives of Meryl and Milly.
25	"Live Through"	Shigeki Awai	Yōsuke Kuroda	September 24, 1998	May 12, 2003
Meryl and Milly take Vash to a small town well away from LR so he can recover from injuries sustained in his fights with Midvalley and Legato. He regains consciousness after 10 days, but is still tormented by Legato's death. Meanwhile, the girls take jobs in town and care for him during their time off. A visiting truck driver recognizes Vash, turning all the residents into a mob eager to kill him unless he leaves town because of the threat he poses. Meryl persuades them to spare Vash, using words that remind him strongly of Rem, and he finds a new sense of tranquility. He sets out to find Knives and Milly gives him the mobile cross-shaped arsenal that Wolfwood carried, saying Vash should carry it in his honor.
26	"Under the Sky So Blue"; Transliteration: "Konna ni mo Aoi Sora no Shita de" (Japanese: こんなにも青い空の下で)	Satoshi Nishimura	Yōsuke Kuroda	October 1, 1998	May 13, 2003
Vash finds Knives in the desert oasis of Dimitri. He reflects on the past 130 years since Knives caused the crash of the Project SEEDS fleet and became determined to wipe out all humans on the planet. He even went so far as to create two revolvers that could be used to trigger the brothers' angel arms. Horrified at Knives' plans, Vash shot him and fled with both guns. Taken in by the residents of the Project SEEDS ship that had stayed aloft, Vash located a descendant of Rem in July and traveled there to meet him, only to find him dead at the hand of Knives. Knives then shoots off Vash's left arm and causes Vash to start his angel arm blast. Vash points his arm at Knives and severely injures him in the ensuing blast, which also destroys the town of July. Some time later, Knives subsequently recruited Legato and the Gung-Ho Guns to cause Vash as much pain and suffering as possible. At the oasis, Vash and Knives engage in a protracted battle, both with guns and their angel arms. Knives gains the advantage and prepares to kill Vash, but Vash shoots and wounds Knives using Wolfwood's cross rather than killing him. Vash discards his red coat and gun along with his identity as the Stampede, resolving to honor Rem's memory and trust his own judgment. He bandages Knives and carries him back to Meryl and Milly, who are overjoyed to see him.

== Home media ==
Original release

- Trigun – The $$60,000,000,000 Man (DVD 1; episodes 1–4) 2000-03-28
- Trigun – The $$60,000,000,000 Man [Geneon Signature Series] (DVD 1) 2004-01-06
- Trigun – The $$60,000,000,000 Man [Essential Anime] (DVD 1) 2004-12-28
- Trigun – Lost Past (DVD 2; episodes 5–7) 2000-05-23
- Trigun – Lost Past [Geneon Signature Series] (DVD 2) 2004-03-09
- Trigun – Lost Past [Essential Anime] (DVD 2) 2004-12-28
- Trigun – Wolfwood (DVD 3; episodes 8–10) 2000-07-25
- Trigun – Wolfwood [Geneon Signature Series] (DVD 3) 2004-04-13
- Trigun – Gung-Ho Guns (DVD 4; episodes 11–13) 2000-09-26
- Trigun – Gung-Ho Guns [Geneon Signature Series] (DVD 4) 2004-05-11
- Trigun – Angel Arms (DVD 5; episodes 14–16) 2000-11-21
- Trigun – Angel Arms [Geneon Signature Series] (DVD 5) 2004-06-08
- Trigun – Project Seeds (DVD 6; episodes 17–19) 2001-01-23
- Trigun – Project Seeds [Geneon Signature Series] (DVD 6) 2004-07-13
- Trigun – Puppet Master (DVD 7; episodes 20–22) 2001-03-27
- Trigun – Puppet Master [Geneon Signature Series] (DVD 7) 2004-08-10
- Trigun – High Noon (DVD 8; episodes 23–26) 2001-05-29
- Trigun – High Noon [Geneon Signature Series] (DVD 8) 2004-09-14

Collections

- Trigun – The Complete Series (DVD 1–4) 2010-10-26
- Trigun – The Complete Series [Anime Classics] (DVD 1–4) 2013-03-12
- Trigun – Limited Collector's Edition I (DVD 1–3) 2005-11-22
- Trigun – Limited Collector's Edition II (DVD 4–6) 2006-01-17
- Trigun – The Complete Box Set (DVD 1–8) 2001-11-20

Remix

- DVD 1 2006-08-01
- DVD 2 2006-09-05
- DVD 3 2006-10-03
- DVD 4 2006-11-07
- DVD 5 2006-12-05
- DVD 6 2007-01-02

== Reception ==
Trigun has frequently been listed among the best anime series of all time. In 2001, Wizard's Anime Magazine ranked Trigun 38th on its "Top 50 Anime released in North America" list, and The Los Angeles Times journalist Charles Solomon named the series's complete box set the seventh-best anime release of 2010. The success of the series increased the popularity of the original manga source material; the first volume of the US release, with an initial print run of 35,000 copies, sold out shortly after release. Theron Martin of Anime News Network gave the anime adaptation a B+, praising its writing and opining that it avoided clichés inherent to the format. However, Martin was more critical of the anime's visuals, writing that characters were sometimes off-model. Comic Book Bin agreed but praised how Funimation was able to remaster the production values. Mike Toole of Anime News Network named Trigun one of the most important anime of the 1990s.

Escapist Magazine columnist H.D. Russell reviewed the anime adaptation in early 2016 as part of a "Good Old Anime Review" column focusing on popular anime from the 1990s to early 2000s. Russell felt that the series's animation and English voice acting had aged poorly, but argued that the depth of the characters and the series's moral themes more than compensated for its faults. He concluded that despite being overshadowed by Cowboy Bebop, the production values were at least average and the series was funny and thoughtful due to its direction and narrative. Trigun failed to garner a large audience in Japan during its original 1998 broadcast, but gained a substantial fan base following its United States premiere, making it one of the rare examples of an anime that was more successful in the West than in its country of origin. Suggested causes of this disparity included the "old west" setting, European-style character names, and a lack of Japanese cultural elements.

Chris Beveridge of AnimeOnDVD enjoyed the storytelling and how Vash's character "runs the gamut of emotions and attitudes". He said the change in Vash's character made him more interesting to watch in the darker scenarios. Beveridge commented that Vash's backstory and its effect on him were "really interesting", though they prompted more questions than answers. Jason Bustard of THEM Anime Reviews called Vash "the poster-child for the misunderstood hero". Similarly, Martin praised Vash's characterization for avoiding clichés often seen in Western stories. In the book Anime Impact: The Movies and Shows that Changed the World of Japanese Animation, Chris Stuckmann compared Vash with John McClane from the Die Hard action films because of the similar misunderstandings the two went through while facing enemies.
