= Noir (TV series) =

2001 Japanese anime television series

- Cover of the first ADV Films DVD volume
- ノワール; Nowāru
- Genre: Adventure, girls with guns
- Created by: Ryōe Tsukimura
- Developed by: Ryōe Tsukimura
- Directed by: Kōichi Mashimo
- Voices of: Houko Kuwashima; Kotono Mitsuishi
- Music by: Yuki Kajiura
- Opening theme: "Coppelia no Hitsugi" by Ali Project
- Ending theme: "Kirei na Kanjō" by Akino Arai
- Country of origin: Japan
- Original language: Japanese
- No. of seasons: 1
- No. of episodes: 26 (list of episodes)

Production
- Producer: Shigeru Kitayama
- Cinematography: Kenji Takehara; Seiichi Morishita
- Editors: Chieko Takayama; Seiji Morita; Yukie Oikawa
- Production companies: Animax; Bandai Channel; Bee Train; TV Tokyo

Original release
- Network: TV Tokyo
- Release: April 6 – September 28, 2001

Noir (Japanese: ノワール, Hepburn: Nowāru) is a 26-episode Japanese anime television series created and written by Ryōe Tsukimura and produced by Victor Entertainment and Bee Train. The series was directed by Kōichi Mashimo, with Yoko Kikuchi, Minako Shiba and Satoko Miyachi in charge of character designs, Kenji Teraoka in charge of mechanical design, and Yuki Kajiura composing the music.

Noir was followed by two spiritual successors, Madlax and El Cazador de la Bruja. Together, these series constitute a trilogy exploring the "girls-with-guns" genre.

Outside of Japan, Noir has been released on DVD by ADV Films in North America and the United Kingdom and by Madman Entertainment in Australia and New Zealand. After ADV closed, Funimation Entertainment acquired the North American rights to the series in 2010.

== Plot ==
Opening introduction, Kirika's (later with Mireille) voice-over towards the audience:

NOIR...It is the name of an ancient fate, two maidens govern death. The peace of the newly born, their black hands protect.

The series follows the story of two young female assassins, the Corsican Mireille Bouquet and the Japanese amnesiac Kirika Yuumura, who embark together on a personal journey to seek answers about mysteries concerning their past. At first, they seem to be only vaguely related to each other, but there are clues and hints given throughout the series that there is more going on behind the scenes than at first glance.

In their journey to learn more about Kirika's lost memories and her connection to Mireille, the two form an alliance and begin performing assassinations under the code name "Noir." During the course of the series, they are lured into more and more traps by a secret organization named Les Soldats ("The Soldiers" in French). Les Soldats are a secret organization that has been a part, yet separate group of humanity. It is this hidden group that created and once completely controlled the deadly duo "Noir". Each time that Les Soldats soldiers are sent to kill Mireille and Kirika, it is considered a test as to whether or not the young women are suitable to carry the title "Noir".

== Characters ==
The main characters; clockwise from top: Altena, Chloe, Kirika, and Mireille

Kirika Yuumura (Note: The email Mireille receives from Kirika in episode 1 romanizes her surname as "Yuumura" (with two u's). In addition, the official English Noir website (Archived April 8, 2003, at the Wayback Machine) also used this naming convention.) (夕叢 霧香, Yūmura Kirika)
Voiced by: Hōko Kuwashima (Japanese); Monica Rial (English)
Kirika is a teenage high school girl with amnesia who lives in Japan, however during her journey she goes to stay with Mireille in her apartment in Paris; the only things she remembers are the word Noir and her instinctual killing abilities. When creating the characters for Noir, producer Shigeru Kitayama wanted the image of Kirika to be "sweet and fragile".
Mireille Bouquet (ミレイユ・ブーケ, Mireiyu Būke)
Voiced by: Kotono Mitsuishi (Japanese); Shelley Calene-Black (English)
Mireille is a Corsican woman born into a powerful crime family. Mireille and her uncle are the sole survivors of a brutal attack on her family, whereafter he trained her to become an assassin.^{ep. 14} When creating the character for Noir, Shigeru Kitayama imagined Mireille as "a lithe female panther". Mitsuishi, the Japanese voice of Mireille, previously worked with Kitayama on Excel Saga, where she voiced the protagonist Excel; the first thing she was told was that Excel and Mireille are completely opposite characters. In the English dub, ADV Films decided against giving Mireille a Corsican accent so as to avoid confusion among viewers unfamiliar with the language.
Chloe (クロエ, Kuroe (Note: Note the homophony to "kuroi", the Japanese word for "black".))
Voiced by: Aya Hisakawa (Japanese); Hilary Haag (English)
Chloe is a skilled assassin who uses throwing and handheld knives instead of guns. Like Kirika and Mireille, Chloe is a candidate to become Noir. Chloe idolizes Kirika for her exceptional killing skills, and she believes that she and Kirika are destined to become Noir together. She is the personal favorite character of Noir's composer Yuki Kajiura.
Altena (アルテナ, Arutena)
Voiced by: Tarako (Japanese); Tiffany Grant (English)
Altena is the high priestess of the Soldats. She believes that the Soldats have been corrupted by power and greed, and she attempts to return the Soldats to its "original state" by reviving Noir. She lives a medieval lifestyle in a place the Soldats consider as their holy site called "The Manor", located somewhere on the border between France and Spain, where she raised and trained Chloe.

== Setting ==
Unlike its spiritual successors Madlax and El Cazador de la Bruja, Noir is mainly about reality's criminal underworld while the later two are about supernatural events. Mireille and Kirika, in episode four, check the profile of a fifteen-year-old student named Rosaly Hammond, discovering that she was born on August 2, 1994. As Rosaly would be turning sixteen, Noir thus takes place approximately between 2010 and 2011.

=== Les Soldats ===
Les Soldats (ソルダ, Soruda) ("The Soldiers" in French) is a mysterious organization in Noir. According to Altena, a thousand years ago, a group of people who had survived a bloody war that cost numerous lives, formed a group called Les Soldats to protect the weak and take revenge on the world. When Kirika travels to a Soldats' village, she finds out that during the late tenth century, Les Soldats has taken place in every social part of humankind. For example, Soldats were witnessed at the birth of the Greone's mafia family, which was created 200 years ago from the time the series began. Near the end of the series, Altena states that "Les Soldats" have been consumed by the very greed they once swore to undo, and thus had become like the world itself.

Although the Soldats were founded by a united group, in Noir its members were separated into two groups: Altena's followers and her opposers, the Soldats' Council members. For easy identification, Altena's most loyal followers are include people who dress up as nuns and common villagers who are skilled at fighting These nuns and priestesses often appear to be ordinary, petite women, they are capable of using guns and other lethal weapons. Altena lives in a manor not located on any map but is near the border of France and Spain. It is known by name "the place which has been forgotten by time". The manor's structure is similar to those of Ancient Greece and Rome. Separated from the manor by mountains, there is a village which belongs to Altena, and their ancient task is to guard her manor.

The Soldats' Council are the people who disagreed with Altena's decision to bring back the True Noir by means of a ritual called the Grand Retour. The Council contains five members, and one of them, Remy Brefford, invites Mireille to join their ranks, and he has an office in a building in Paris.

Men in black suits are often sent by the Soldats to try to kill the Noir candidates, but the faction affiliate of these men is unclear. Altena successfully manipulates everyone in the group, and she particularly targets the three Noir candidates Chloe, Kirika, and Mireille. She hides her true agenda from the Soldats, even her most trusted advisers, until the end. Altena led the Soldats to believe that she wanted Chloe and Kirika to be the True Noir, to enforce the will of the Soldats. However, she believed that Mireille and Kirika would enact her true plan, to destroy the Soldats. Altena's plan was not fully successful because Mireille did not target the Council at the end of the series.

=== Noir ===
Noir is the French word for "black". In Noir, it is known as the name of the two maidens who govern death. Pictures and sculptures of the two maidens can be seen on Mireille's father's watch and on Soldats' churches. To the underworld, it is known as the "One Thousand Year" darkness of Europe. According to Altena's story, when the Soldats went under, two hands were left on the surface, so their ancient task is to retrieve the two maidens known as "Noir". The ritual to become Noir takes place under Altena's manor, an underground temple in the style of ancient Greek ruins.

Throughout the series, the only three candidates for "Noir" are Mireille Bouquet, Kirika Yuumura and Chloe. Of all the three, Mireille was the only who was predicted to be neglected, and Kirika probably is the only who can turn into True Noir. When one has fallen, the remaining two shall become Noir.

== Production ==
According to the director Kōichi Mashimo, he envisioned Noir and Madlax as part of a trilogy exploring the girls-with-guns genre, and soon after the release of the latter, he confirmed having plans to produce the third installment, which would later become El Cazador de la Bruja.

For Mireille's personal sidearm, Mashimo wanted a gun with "a more modern image", therefore the production staff decided on the Walther P99. After considering several compact pistols, including the Walther PPK and the Glock 26, for Kirika's personal sidearm, the Beretta M1934 became the weapon of choice, because of its "classic, European feel" that suited the premise of the series' story. Because of the organization's premise, European guns were chosen for the members of Les Soldats. The assassins in black suits that are sent after the protagonists throughout the series all carry the SIG Pro 2340, which at the time of production was the newest model of its line, while other members were given increasingly older weapons, depending on the member's rank.

According to producer Shigeru Kitayama, Kotono Mitsuishi's voicing of Mireille was a continuation of the working relationship they had from creating Excel Saga, where Mitsuishi voiced the protagonist Excel.

== Media ==
=== TV airings and home video ===
The 26 episodes of the Noir anime series initially ran from April 6 through September 28, 2001, on TV Tokyo in Japan and was released on DVD and VHS in 13 compilations, each containing two episodes, by Victor Entertainment between July 25, 2001, and March 21, 2002.

Victor Entertainment has remastered the series from its original 35mm elements and released a Blu-ray Disc version on February 19, 2014, in Japan.

=== Soundtrack ===
Like many of studio Bee Train's other works, the Noir soundtrack was composed by Yuki Kajiura, accompanied by primary vocalist Yuriko Kaida, secondary vocalist Yuri Kasahara, and Kajiura's band See-Saw.

The series makes use of two pieces of theme music. "Coppelia no Hitsugi" (コッペリアの柩, Kopperia no Hitsugi; lit. 'Coppelia's Casket') by Ali Project is used as opening theme, while "Kirei na Kanjō" (きれいな感情; lit. 'Beautiful Emotions') by Akino Arai serves as ending theme.

Victor Entertainment published a single and three original soundtrack albums for the series. "Coppelia no Hitsugi" was released as a single on May 23, 2001. The first and second soundtracks, called Noir: Original Soundtrack I and Noir: Original Soundtrack II, were released on June 21 and October 3, 2001, respectively. The third soundtrack, called Blanc dans Noir (〜黒の中の白〜, Kuro no Naka no Shiro; English: White in Black), was released on November 7, 2001.

Coppelia no Hitsugi
No.	Title	Lyrics	Music	Length
1.	"Coppelia no Hitsugi" (Kopperia no Hitsugi (コッペリアの柩; "Coppélia's Casket"))	Arika Takarano	Mikiya Katakura	3:59
2.	"Après le Noir"	Takarano	Katakura	4:17
Total length:				8:18

All music is composed by Yuki Kajiura, except where indicated.

Noir: Original Soundtrack I
No.	Title	Lyrics	Music	Artist	Length
1.	"Coppelia no Hitsugi" (Kopperia no Hitsugi (コッペリアの柩; "Coppélia's Casket"))	Arika Takarano	Mikiya Katakura	Ali Project	3:59
2.	"Les Soldats"				2:26
3.	"Snow"				2:11
4.	"Canta per me"				3:13
5.	"Corsican Corridor"				3:47
6.	"Ode to Power"				2:54
7.	"Solitude by the Window"				3:08
8.	"Romance"				3:43
9.	"Silent Pain"				2:01
10.	"Lullaby"				3:16
11.	"Melodie"				1:58
12.	"Chloe"				2:24
13.	"Whispering Hills"				3:32
14.	"Zero Hour"				2:36
15.	"Liar You Lie"				3:14
16.	"Sorrow"				2:41
17.	"Salva Nos"				4:29
18.	"Kirei na Kanjō" ((きれいな感情; "Beautiful Emotions"))	Akino Arai	Arai	Akino Arai	4:16
Total length:					56:06

Noir: Original Soundtrack II
No.	Title	Music	Artist	Length
1.	"Le Grand Retour"			6:24
2.	"Secret Game"		Yuri Kasahara	3:44
3.	"Fake Garden"			2:01
4.	"Les Soldats II"			3:27
5.	"In Memory of You"			3:54
6.	"Colosseum"			3:46
7.	"Salva Nos II"		Yuriko Kaida	2:46
8.	"Maze"		Yuri Kasahara	2:14
9.	"In Peace"			2:27
10.	"Despair"			1:58
11.	"Power Hungry"			2:16
12.	"Black Is Black"			2:42
13.	"Canta per me II"		Yuriko Kaida	3:21
14.	"At Dusk"			1:51
15.	"Premonition"			3:18
16.	"Killing"			2:56
17.	"A Farewell Song"			3:34
18.	"Kirei na Kanjō" (Piano Version)	Akino Arai		1:46
19.	"Indio"		See-Saw	6:25
Total length:				59:03

Blanc dans Noir (CD 1 - Vocal Song Collection)
No.	Title	Lyrics	Music	Artist	Length
1.	"Aka to Kuro" ((赤と黒; "Red and Black"))	Arika Takarano	Mikiya Katakura	Ali Project	4:52
2.	"Prelude"				0:56
3.	"Canta per me" (Japanese Version)			Hōko Kuwashima	3:15
4.	"Lullaby" (Japanese Version)			Tarako	3:16
5.	"Aime Moi" (Emu Moa (エム・モア))	Kenzo Saeki	Hirofumi Asamoto	Hōko Kuwashima	4:17
6.	"Himitsu" ("Secret" (秘密))			Aya Hisakawa	5:03
7.	"Salva Nos" (Dialogue Remix)			Yuriko Kaida and Kotono Mitsuishi	4:26
8.	"Love"			Chiaki	4:59
9.	"Gensou Rakuen" ((幻想楽園; "Illusion Paradise"))			Yuriko Kaida	5:41
Total length:					36:54

Blanc dans Noir (CD 2 - BGM Outtrack Collection)
No.	Title	Length
1.	"Guest B"	1:04
2.	"Melodie" (Salva Nos Version)	3:03
3.	"Jealousy"	2:52
4.	"At Dawn"	1:37
5.	"Black Society"	2:45
6.	"Family Affection"	2:52
7.	"Church"	1:51
8.	"At Ease"	1:50
Total length:		18:02

=== International release and distribution ===
After giving hints, announcements, and retractions for almost a year, ADV Films released the series in English in seven DVD compilations, the first containing five episodes, the others containing three or four episodes, between February 18 and October 28, 2003. Prior to that, the first episode was included on the DVD insert of the January 2003 issue of Newtype USA.

Following the closure and restructuring of ADV Films in 2009, the series is now licensed by Funimation Entertainment, which is currently known as Crunchyroll, LLC in North America, and re-released the series as a part of their Anime Classics line on August 9, 2011, along with the Blu-ray release on April 15, 2015. The series is also available for video streaming on both FunimationNOW and Crunchyroll.

== Potential live-action remake ==
A possible live action feature based on the anime series has been planned for development by the cable television network Starz. Sam Raimi and Rob Tapert (Hercules: The Legendary Journeys, Xena: Warrior Princess, Legend of the Seeker) are the executive producers for the project. Stephen Lightfoot was serving as executive producer and writer but was replaced by Sean Jablonski.

In March 2012, Starz CEO Chris Albrecht commented that production has been put on hiatus as he states in an interview, "We're in a bit of holding pattern with Noir." Then in December of that year, two new writers, Cyrus Voris and Ethan Reiff, were announced to have joined the project and were undertaking re-writes of Jablonski's scripts. By January 2013, Starz CEO Chris Albrecht announced that the project remained at a standstill citing difficulty to get the project creatively to a good place.

== Reception ==
Critical reception of Noir has been positive. Newtype ranked Noir second in its top 10 list of anime of the year 2001. Noir also made a top three place in the top 20 anime in Japan chart by Anihabara! in October 2001. In the June 2002 issue of Animage, Noir was voted by the magazine's readers onto a shared 10th place in the best 20 new anime of 2001 in Japan. Josh Mohs of Active Anime commented that "Noir doesn't fail to deliver mystery, action, and drama." Though he lamented "some pacing problems, especially towards the beginning of the series," he lauded the character interactions as well as the series' "job of tying together all its inherent sub-plots" and the director's "bold move" in leaving "the ending open to viewer interpretation." In a review of the first DVD compilation by ADV Films, Jeremy Conrad of IGN lauded the series for being "stylistic", stating that "It oozes style", and for its "extremely cool" fight choreography and "great" shootouts, saying that "What Noir does right is its action." He also noted the series' character design as being "solid" and the series' soundtrack as being "excellent", reminiscent of "Éric Serra's stuff in movies such as La Femme Nikita", but lamented about the slowed pace at the end of the volume, stating that "some of the story stuff they were trying to do [in the fourth and fifth episodes] was snooze inducing." Josh Mohs of Active Anime commentEd that Noir's "strong character interactions are usually enough to pull you through" the pacing problems he saw with the series and further states that, along with the series' "unique twists", the "intriguing character dynamic definitely elevate[s] it above the rest of the competition." Kirika had been voted with Mireille as two of the top ten female anime characters by Newtype in 2001.

Anime News Network's Theron Martin, ten years after the show's original run, gave the series a rating of B+, and commented that Noir "was at least to some degree an influential title" and "is still recognized as one of the preeminent titles of its type because it redefined what a 'girls with guns' title could be." He went on to praise the show for its "sleek, elegant story" and called it "anime's most pronounced homage to classic film noir". He named Mireille and Kirika "one of anime's most iconic female teams" along with the Dirty Pair and credited Kirika as "a precursor of the moe craze that came along later in the decade." He named "The Lost Kitten" as the series' episode with the best story content, and the double episode "The Intoccabile" as having the worst, noting its "hackneyed look into the Cosa Nostra". He lamented repetitiveness in action sequences and excessive reuse of scenes especially in early episodes as well as the absence of blood in light of the show's high body count. He showed himself unimpressed with the animation quality, but lauded the show's good looks, in particular those of the environments. He named the "tendency for repetitiveness" of its first half as the soundtrack's "only real flaw" and praised the pieces "Salva Nos" and "Canta Per Me" as "stand[ing] among the all-time great anime themes". About the English version, he commented that the "casting choices fit and match up well against the original performances" and that the "script stays tight enough to avoid garnering any accuracy complaints". In conclusion, he said "the series works in the ways that it is supposed to work and should keep viewers thoroughly involved through to the end."

Diane Tiu of THEM Anime Reviews gave Noir a rating of 4 out of 5 stars, praising the story, characters, soundtrack, and the relationship between Mireille and Kirika, but questioned the lack of blood and how the main characters always seem to take out their opposition single-handedly. Overall, Tiu concludes that "Noir oozes style. It is an original anime that stands out - the perfect anime if you've had too much fluff." Enoch Lau, also of THEM Anime Reviews, also gave the series a 4 out of 5 star rating, handing out praise to the animation, visuals, story, soundtrack, action scenes, and the chemistry between Mireille and Kirika. Lau's only criticisms was the lack of blood, as well as the slow pacing of the series, but concluded overall that "The cream of action-drama anime has just gotten sweeter and creamier with Noir. The slow pace and sombre mood of the plot might turn off some people, but those who stick with it will be rewarded with brilliant action scenes and awesome chicks with guns."
