= Eiji Suganuma =

Japanese anime director

- 菅沼 栄治
- Occupations: Animator, character designer, anime director
- Spouse: Yoko Kikuchi

Eiji Suganuma (Japanese: 菅沼 栄治, Hepburn: Suganuma Eiji) is a Japanese animator, director and character designer. He has directed Ninja Cadets, Kodomo no Jikan, Whispered Words, Mashiroiro Symphony, and Karneval.

== Filmography ==
List of production work in anime
Year	Title	Crew role	Notes	Ref.
1986-87	Machine Robo: Revenge of Cronos	Animation director (eps. 10, 13, 20)		
1988-89	Tsurupika Hagemaru	Animation director		
1988	Mobile Suit Gundam: Char's Counterattack	Key animation		
1988-89	Gunbuster	Key animation (eps. 5–6)		
1989	Riding Bean	Key animation		
1991	NG Knight Ramune & 40 EX	Character design, animation director, key animation		
1993	NG Knight Ramune & 40 DX	Unit director (OP), character design, animation director (OP), key animation (OP)		
1996	Ninja Cadets	Creator, director, scenario, character design, animation director, key animation		
1997	Maze	Novel illustrator, original character design	Also OVA in 1996 and movie in 1998	
2001-02	Read or Die (OVA)	Mecha design, Key Animation (eps. 1–3), Mechanical animation director		
2004-05	AM Driver	Character design, animation director (OP; ED; eps 1, 51), key animation (OP; ED; eps. 5, 12, 31, 33, 38, 45–46, 48, 50–51)		
2007	Code-E	Mechanical design		
2007	Kodomo no Jikan	Director, storyboard (OP; eps. 6, 12), episode director (ep. 12), unit director (OP), key animation (ep. 10)	Also OVAs in 2009, 2011	
2009	Whispered Words	Director		
2010	Mayoi Neko Overrun! omake series	Director	OVAs	
2011	Mashiroiro Symphony	Director, key animation (ep. 10)		
2013	Karneval	Director, storyboard (eps. 1–2), animation director (Effects; ep. 13), concept, key animation (ep. 13)		
2016	Garakowa: Restore the World	Unit director, virus design, key animation		
2016	B-PROJECT～Kodō＊Ambitious～	Director		
2018	Lord of Vermilion: The Crimson King	Director		
2021-22	Lupin the 3rd Part 6	Director		
