= Karneval (manga) =

Japanese manga and anime series

- Cover of Karneval volume 1 as published by Ichijinsha, featuring Nai

カーニヴァル (Kānivaru)
- Genre: Fantasy
- Manga
- Written by: Tōya Mikanagi
- Published by: Ichijinsha
- English publisher: AUS: Madman Entertainment; NA: Yen Press
- Magazine: Monthly Comic Zero Sum
- Original run: August 28, 2007 – October 28, 2021
- Volumes: 28
- Anime television series
- Directed by: Eiji Suganuma
- Written by: Touko Machida
- Music by: Shiro Hamaguchi; Keiji Inai
- Studio: Manglobe
- Licensed by: AUS: Madman Entertainment; NA: Funimation; UK: Manga Entertainment
- Original network: ABC, Tokyo MX, AT-X, BS11
- English network: US: Funimation Channel
- Original run: April 3, 2013 – June 26, 2013
- Episodes: 13

Karneval (Japanese: カーニヴァル, Hepburn: Kānivaru) is a Japanese manga series by Tōya Mikanagi which began serialization in the monthly josei manga magazine Monthly Comic Zero Sum published by Ichijinsha on August 28, 2007. There are currently twenty-eight volumes released in Japan. The series follows Nai and Gareki, who join a defense organization called Circus in hopes of finding a man named Karoku. However, they are unaware that Karoku belongs to a secret organization called Kafka, which is responsible for performing human and animal experiments called Varugas. A 13-episode anime adaptation by Manglobe aired between April and June 2013.

== Plot ==
Nai searches for someone important to him, with only an abandoned bracelet as a clue. Gareki steals and pick-pockets to get by from day to day. The two meet in a strange mansion where they are set up, and soon become wanted criminals by military security operatives. When Nai and Gareki find themselves desperate in a hopeless predicament, they encounter none other than the country's most powerful defense organization, "Circus".

== Characters ==
=== Main characters ===
Nai Muhinyi (无)
Voiced by: Hiro Shimono (Japanese); Sean Michael Teague (English)
Nai Muhinyi is the main protagonist of the story. He claims to have always been living with a man named Karoku in a forest near Karasuna. When Karoku does not appear one day, Nai ventures outside and finds a trail of blood leading from their home to the sea, and a left-behind bracelet (Circus I.D.). Feeling scared and lonely, he sets out to try finding Karoku with only the abandoned bracelet as a clue. He eventually meets Gareki, who saves Nai from a mansion where a Varuga woman named Miné was keeping him captive. This marks the beginning of their travel together. Despite his unworldly ways, he has an acute sense of hearing that is more well-developed compared to other people's. Akari, a research doctor at Circus reveals that Nai has the cellular structure of a human and a "Niji", a small, delicate creature found in the forest he came from, and that these cells have managed to coexist unlike the Varuga. He also said that Nai is successfully existing as a new species and that if they were to describe the person who accomplished this, they would certainly be called a genius and that to produce a being like Nai, the creator must have been very devoted.
Gareki (花礫)
Voiced by: Hiroshi Kamiya (Japanese); Greg Ayres (English)
A 15-year-old boy who gets money by robbing rich people's mansions. He is very intelligent and sharp, his strong point being his knowledge of mechanics. He is also a skilled shooter and likes to carry around a gun. Gareki distrusts people and is not very sociable, stating that he hates associating with others. However, despite his arrogant and distant attitude, he does have a more caring side that he does not like showing, seeming to have a soft spot for his friends on the second ship and Nai. He originally thought to use Nai for his robbing schemes but later joins him to find Karoku. When Nai tells Gareki about Karoku knowing that they were together, Gareki realizes that Karoku wants to keep him away from Nai. Gareki works with the Circus organization to help defeat Kafta and Varuga, who killed Tsubaki and Yokata.

=== Circus ===
Circus is a defense organization that works for the government. They perform raids to capture criminals and solve crimes that the Security Force otherwise cannot handle. After their raids, they put on shows as an apology for scaring the citizens.

Yogi (與儀)
Voiced by: Mamoru Miyano (Japanese); Christopher Bevins (English)
The Second Ship's Fighter Yogi is an eccentric 21-year-old man who is always bright and cheerful. He is Hirato's subordinate. Despite his age, he tends to act like a child. He wears a white allergy patch on his left cheek, that, when removed, causes him to become extremely violent, as well as changing his hair color. While he states that battles make him nervous, he is still a skilled fighter. During the Circus's public shows he usually wears a cat costume named "Nyanperowna" and hands out candy to children. His weapons are two thornlike épées, and the name of his special attack is Dornkiste (German for "thorn chest"). He calls Nai "little Nai". He looks after Gareki and Nai with Tsukumo. Though Yogi cares for everyone, he has a soft spot for Gareki.
Tsukumo (ツクモ)
Voiced by: Aya Endō (Japanese); Jad Saxton (English)
Another fighter of the Second Ship's crew, and Hirato's subordinate. She is always wearing a serious expression on her face, is down to earth, and very dedicated. Tsukumo is a skilled acrobat and her beauty is complimented by both men and women. She is the most level-headed out of the group, and tries to be the shoulder to lean on even though she has a hard time understanding others emotions. Tsukumo is close to Nai, and cares about his well-being. She hated insects ever since she was a child, which was shown when Yogi mentioned that the species "Niji" has a diet of primarily insects.
Hirato (平門)
Voiced by: Daisuke Ono (Japanese); Ian Sinclair (English)
The Second Ship's Captain. A very polite 27-year-old man who does not take his work too seriously, but does his job well. His smile can be deceiving and people have a hard time figuring out his true intentions and feelings. Upon taking Gareki and Nai on board his ship, he entrusts them to Yogi and Tsukumo. His weapon is a cane, and the name of his special attack is Vakuum (German for "vacuum").
Eva (イヴァ, Iva)
Voiced by: Yōko Honna (Japanese); Jessica Cavanagh (English)
The Second Ship's 25-year-old Lieutenant. She appears to be soft and feminine when she is with women but acts masculine when she is with men. She is very fond of Tsukumo.
Akari (燭)
Voiced by: Daisuke Hirakawa (Japanese); David Matranga (English)
A doctor working for the government. He is a complete workaholic; a fact which often grates on the nerves of the people around him. He does not seem to have a good relationship with Hirato, and Yogi seems to be slightly scared of him. It is implied that he is wealthy. Due to the reserved, unfeeling and stoic front, he puts up most of the time he is rather disliked by many, yet he is actually a very gentle person who cares for living beings, Nai being one of them.
Jiki (喰)
Voiced by: Yuichi Nakamura (Japanese); Aaron Dismuke (English)
A soft-spoken botanist who also First Ship's fighter. Jiki seems to have feelings for Tsukumo from the Second Ship and he does not get along very well with Eva.
Tsukitachi (朔)
Voiced by: Koji Yusa (Japanese); J. Michael Tatum (English)
The First Ship's Captain. An easygoing member of Circus who does not care about the small things. He often comes off as being quite rude, but he is simply being straightforward with his observations. He is the same age as Hirato.
Kiichi (キイチ)
Voiced by: Eri Kitamura (Japanese); Alison Viktorin (English)
The First Ship's fighter. A female member of Circus who is strong-willed, a sore loser and perfectionist. She considers Tsukumo her rival.
Azana (アザナ)
Voiced by: Nobuhiko Okamoto (Japanese); Jerry Jewell (English)
Akari's long-haired assistant, originally stationed in Life Division but occasionally help in Research Tower. He is very gentle and a bit of a klutz. His face is usually littered with band-aids. His family was killed by Varuga.
Ryoushi (療師, Ryōshi)
Voiced by: Kenichi Ogata (Japanese); Bob Magruder (English)
A white-bearded doctor working for the government, also known as the "Healer". He is very easygoing and happy-go-lucky despite his doctor status. He also likes to compliment girls and to act bubbly, like a kid. He does not take things seriously like Akari does, and enjoys prancing around laughing happily. However, when he sees Yogi, he sometimes throws him out of the room, quite literally.

=== Kafka ===
Kafka is a dark, hidden organization/place that does illegal genetic research. Their ultimate goal is to bring about the growth of incuna cells in human beings. They oppose the government and work against Circus.

Karoku (嘉禄)
Voiced by: Sōichirō Hoshi (Japanese); Vic Mignogna (English)
The person that Nai is looking for. He is 18 years old, and is described by Nai as a gentle person, but their connection is still unknown. He is still alive, but his location is unknown. At the end of the second episode of the anime, however, it is implied that Karoku is held somewhere by Kafka. He is seen in a dark greenhouse full of roses with Eliška, the young granddaughter of a rich industrial who is implied to be the leader of Kafka. He sends messages to Nai through brain waves. He calls Nai his "special child". During the incident at the Misty Mansion, it is revealed that there are two Karokus; one that appears to be Karoku but is not, and one that is the original Karoku. Gareki and Nai rescue the presumably dead original Karoku but Akari brings him back to life. When revived, he has no memories of who Nai is. After Nai protects him from dying, Karoku remembers Nai again.
Eliška (エリシュカ, Erishuka; alt. Eleska)
Voiced by: Satomi Satō (Japanese); Tia Ballard (English)
The 14-year-old granddaughter of Palnedo, the CEO of Gald. She grew up in an environment where she was treated like a princess, and as a result she was brought up to be a selfish girl who does not know how to be considerate towards others. She is revealed to have feelings for the fake Karoku. At one point when she hears Karoku say there is a special child in Circus, she believes him to be talking about Tsukumo, which makes her feel jealous. She seems to be unaware of Uro and her grandfather's true intentions and schemes.
Uro (黒白)
Voiced by: Junichi Suwabe (Japanese); Brandon Potter (English)
An associate related to Kafka whose powers are immense but yet to be revealed as of chapter 60 in the manga. Outwardly he acts as an escort and caretaker for Eliška and her grandfather, but controls and orders Varuga behind the scenes.
Palnedo (パルネド, Parunedo)
Voiced by: Masashi Hirose (Japanese); R. Bruce Elliott (English)
The grandfather of Eliška and a rich CEO of Gald. He originally orchestrated the train hijacking to see how Circus would handle the situation. When Circus infiltrated the Misty Mansion, he discreetly escaped via submarine.
Kagiri (夏切)
Voiced by: Toshiyuki Toyonaga (Japanese); Tyson Rinehart (English)
Works under Uro with his partner Kiharu. He is a Varuga and is the brains opposite Kiharu. He, along with Kiharu, witnessed Yogi in his berserk form after his allergic patch was removed during a battle in the forest.
Kiharu (麒春)
Voiced by: Tomoaki Maeno (Japanese); Jason Liebrecht (English)
Works under Uro with his partner Kagiri. He is a Varuga and is the nut opposite Kagiri. He, along with Kagiri, witnessed Yogi in his berserk form after his allergic patch was removed during a battle in the forest.

=== Varugas ===
Varugas are post-humans and post-animals with special abilities. They were once human or animal, but a cell-modifying medicine given to them by Kafka slowly took over their bodies until they were fully transformed, at which point they became monsters.

Meiga (迷呀)
Voiced by: Toru Okawa (Japanese); Scott Freeman (English)
A man with a claw-like right hand and red right eye when transformed. He experimented on Tsubame and Yotaka with different results and is the one responsible for killing Tsubaki.
Miné (ミネ, Mine)
Voiced by: Sanae Kobayashi (Japanese); Anastasia Muñoz (English)
A wealthy woman who captured Nai, first seen in a mansion. Her arms can extend to extreme lengths. She was crushed under the rubble after a tussle with Gareki, and she died possibly by Uro.
Delmen (デルメン, Derumen)
Voiced by: Yoshihisa Kawahara (Japanese); Ray Hurd (English)
A man of large stature with two extra arms. He has an obsession for eyes. He attempted to attack Airship Two and capture Nai during their game of hide-and-seek, but failed in the end. He later returns to attack Circus during their infiltration into the Misty Mansion.
Nima (ニマ)
Voiced by: Hiromi Igarashi (Japanese); Cynthia Cranz (English)
A woman with long hair and caterpillar-like body. She has the ability to pass through the ground, who attempted to attack Airship Two and capture Nai during their game of hide-and-seek, but failed in the end. She later returns to attack Circus during their infiltration into the Misty Mansion.

=== Other characters ===
Yanari (八莉)
Voiced by: Mutsumi Tamura (Japanese); Lara Woodhull (English)
The son of the president of the Lindain Group. He was protected by Nai, Gareki and Yogi after meeting them in a Nyanperowna shop.
Tsubaki (ツバキ)
Voiced by: Yōko Hikasa (Japanese); Caitlin Glass (English)
A young woman who saved and raised Gareki for some time. She was killed by Meiga.
Tsubame (ツバメ)
Voiced by: Sayuri Yahagi (Japanese); Lindsay Seidel (English)
Tsubaki's younger sister and Yotaka's twin sister. She experienced psychosomatic results from Meiga's experiments.
Yotaka (ヨタカ)
Voiced by: Miyu Irino (Japanese); Josh Grelle (English)
Tsubaki's younger brother and Tsubame's twin brother. He experienced physical results from Meiga's experiments.
Tokitatsu (時辰)
Voiced by: Katsuyuki Konishi (Japanese); Greg Dulcie (English)
Hirato's older brother.

== Media ==
=== Manga ===
On August 22, 2014, North American manga publisher Yen Press announced the license of the manga, with the first volume to be published on March 24, 2015. Yen Press is releasing Karneval volumes in a 2-in-1 omnibus format.

==== Volume list ====
No.	Original release date	Original ISBN	English release date	English ISBN
1	March 17, 2008	978-4-7580-5341-9	March 24, 2015	978-0-316-38309-7
Score 1: "Opening" (オープニング, Ōpuningu); Score 2: "Wanted" (指名手配, Shimei Tehai); Score 3: "Commotion" (騒音, Sōon); Score 4: "Circus" (輪, Sākasu); Score 5: "Black Sheep" (黒い羊, Kuroi Hitsuji); Score 6: "Hide-and-Seek" (かくれんぼ, Kakurenbo)
2	September 25, 2008	978-4-7580-5369-3	N/A (Part of omnibus volume 1)	—
Score 7: "Tears" (涙, Namida); Score 8: "Your Body" (きみのからだ, Kimi no Karada); Score 9: "The Research Tower" (研案塔, Ken an Tō); Score 10: "The Rainbow Forest" (二ジの森, Niji no Mori); Score 11: "Eva" (イヴァ, Iva); Score 12: "In Karasuna" (カラスナにて, Karasuna Nite)
3	April 25, 2009	978-4-7580-5409-6	July 21, 2015	978-0-316-26347-4
Score 13: "Flightless Wings" (飛べない翼, Tobenai Tsubasa); Score 14: "Look to the Sky" (空を見ろ, Sora o Miro); Score 15: "The Mermaid's Jar" (人魚の瓶, Ningyo no Bin); Score 16: "Rinol" (リノル, Rinoru); Score 17: "Lost Yukkin" (迷子のユッキン, Maigo no Yukkin); Score 18: "Clash" (衝突, Shōtotsu)
4	September 25, 2009	978-4-7580-5444-7	N/A (Part of omnibus volume 2)	—
Score 19: "Vow" (誓い, Chikai); Score 20: "Small Voices" (ちいさな声, Chīsana Koe); Score 21: "The 1st Ship" (壱號艇, Ichi gō Tei); Score 22: "Specialized Ecosystem" (特殊環境, Tokushu Kankyō); Score 23: "A Kind Person" (優しい人, Yasashī Hito); Score 24: "A Place of One's Own" (自分の場所, Jibun no Basho)
5	March 25, 2010	978-4-7580-5492-8	November 17, 2015	978-0-316-26348-1
Score 25: "Vantonam" (ヴァントナーム, Vantonāmu); Score 26: "Yanari" (八莉, Yanari); Score 27: "Kidnappers" (誘拐犯, Yūkai Han); Score 28: "A Warm Home" (暖かな家, Atatakana ie); Score 29: "Unsolvable Equation" (解けない数式, Hodokenai Sūshiki); Score 30: "Decision" (決断, Ketsudan)
6	October 25, 2010	978-4-7580-5552-9	N/A (Part of omnibus volume 3)	—
Score 31: "The Operation Commences" (行動開始, Kōdō Kaishi); Score 32: "The Smoky Mansion" (煙の館, Kemuri no Yakata); Score 33: "Expanding the Battle Lines" (戦線拡大, Sensen Kakudai); Score 34: "Rainbow" (虹, Niji); Score 35: "Karoku" (嘉禄, Karoku); Score 36: "To Each Their Own" (それぞれの, Sorezore no); Side Story: "Hearty Party"
7	April 25, 2011	978-4-7580-5588-8; ISBN 978-4-7580-5589-5 (limited edition)	March 22, 2016	978-0-316-26349-8
Score 37: "Chronomè" (クロノメイ, Kuronomei); Score 38: "Awakening" (目覚め, Mezame); Score 39: "Within Memories" (記憶のなか, Kioku no Naka); Score 40: "Until I Reach You" (君に届くまで, Kimi ni Todoku Made); Score 41: "Distance" (距離, Kyori); Score 42: "Beneath the Starry Sky" (星空の下, Hoshizora no Shita)
8	October 25, 2011	978-4-7580-5655-7	N/A (Part of omnibus volume 4)	—
Score 43: "Rejection" (拒絶, Kyozetsu); Score 44: "Progress" (前進, Zenshin); Score 45: "Meeting Underway" (会議中, Kaigi Chū); Score 46: "Beautiful Girl" (美しい少女, Utsukushī Shōjo); Score 47: "Cage of Thorns" (いばらの檻, Ibara no Ori); Score 48: "Reconstruction" (再構築, Sai Kōchiku)
9	April 25, 2012	978-4-7580-5698-4	July 26, 2016	978-0-316-26350-4
Score 49: "Choice" (選択, Sentaku); Score 50: "Nai" (无, Nai); Score 51: "Defenseless" (無防備, Mubōbi); Score 52: "Joined Hands" (繋ぐ手, Tsunagu te); Score 53: "Allies" (仲間, Nakama); Score 54: "Right Beside You" (すぐ側に, Sugu Soba ni)
10	October 25, 2012	978-4-7580-5746-2; ISBN 978-4-7580-5747-9 (limited edition)	N/A (Part of omnibus volume 5)	—
Score 55: "Halo" (日暈, Higasa); Score 56: "Embrace" (抱擁, Hōyō); Score 57: "Hunger" (空腹, Kūfuku); Score 58: "Territory" (ナワバリ, Nawabari); Score 59: "That Silver One" (銀色の, Gin'iro no); Score 60: "The Two as One" (二人はひとつ, Futari wa Hitotsu)
11	April 25, 2013	978-4-7580-5803-2; ISBN 978-4-7580-5804-9 (limited edition)	November 22, 2016	978-0-316-26353-5
Score 61: "A Game of Tag" (鬼ごっこ, Onigokko); Score 62: "A Wonderful Kingdom" (すてきなくに, Sutekina Kuni); Score 63: "The Lonely Prince" (孤独な王子, Kodokuna Ōji); Score 64: "Found You" (みつけた, Mitsuketa); Score 65: "Message" (メッセージ, Messēji); Score 66: "Intention" (意思, Ishi)
12	October 25, 2013	978-4-7580-5857-5	N/A (Part of omnibus volume 6)	—
Score 67: "The Price of Happiness" (幸せの値, Shiawase no Ne); Score 68: "An Invitation" (招待状, Shōtaijō); Score 69: "Soldiers" (ソルジャーズ, Sorujāzu); Score 70: "Dreams Come Raining Down" (夢に降る, Yume ni Furu); Score 71: "Unmelting Snow" (消えない雪, Kienai Yuki); Score 72: "Lies and Truth" (嘘と真実, Uso to Shinjitsu)
13	April 25, 2014	978-4-7580-5905-3; ISBN 978-4-7580-5906-0 (limited edition)	May 23, 2017	978-0-316-54780-2
Score 73: "A New View" (新しい景色, Atarashī Keshiki); Score 74: "A Place to Return" (戻る場所, Modoru Basho); Score 75: "The Pinpoint of Infiltration" (侵入の針, Shin'nyū no Hari); Score 76: "Lockdown" (緊急事態, Kinkyū Jitai); Score 77: "Beauteous Light" (美しき光, Utsukushiki Hikari); Special Side Story: "The Important Thing About the Professor"
14	October 25, 2014	978-4-7580-5960-2; ISBN 978-4-7580-5961-9 (limited edition)	N/A (Part of omnibus volume 7)	—
Score 78: "With These Hands" (この手で, Kono-te de); Score 79: "A Fierce Battle" (激戦, Gekisen); Score 80: "Monitor Room" (モニタールーム, Monitā Rūmu); Score 81: "The Mist of Life" (命の霧, Inochi no Kiri); Score 82: "Sphere" (球体, Kyūtai); Score 83: "You in the South" (南の君, Minami no Kimi)
15	April 25, 2015	978-4-7580-3035-9; ISBN 978-4-7580-3036-6 (limited edition)	November 28, 2017	978-0-316-47234-0
Score 84: "Where the Flower Blooms" (花の咲く場所, Hana no Saku Basho); Score 85: "Like a Ray of Sun on a Field" (それは野に射す陽にも似て, Sore wa no ni Sasu Yō ni mo Nite); Score 86: "Beyond the Door" (扉の先, Tobira no Saki); Score 87: "What I Want to Become" (なりたいもの, Naritai Mono); Score 88: "Combat Medic" (闘員医術師, Toin Ijutsu-shi); Score 89: "Cookies of Love" (愛のクッキー, Ai no Kukkī)
16	October 24, 2015	978-4-7580-3120-2; ISBN 978-4-7580-3121-9 (limited edition)	N/A (Part of omnibus volume 8)	—
Score 90: "Sought Purpose" (求める意思, Motomeru Ishi); Score 91: "White Bird" (白い鳥, Shiroi Tori); Score 92: "Merge" (共有, Kyōyū); Score 93: "Senpai" (先輩, Senpai); Score 94: "The Journey of Nyanperona and the Ribbon" (ニャンペローナとリボンの旅, Nyanperōna to Ribon no Tabi); Score 95: "A Day of Souvenirs" (お土産の日, Omiyage no Hi)
17	April 25, 2016	978-4-7580-3177-6; ISBN 978-4-7580-3178-3 (limited edition)	December 10, 2019	978-1-975-32646-3
Score 96: "Atop the Ship" (艇の上, Tei no Ue); Score 97: "Seal the Demon" (封じ鬼, Fūji Oni); Score 98: "Leberganze" (レーベルガンゼ, Rēberuganze); Score 99: "The Flower Amidst the Snow" (雪の中の花, Yuki no Naka no Hana); Score 100: "Day of Destiny" (運命の日, Unmei no Hi); Score 101: "Migratory Bird" (渡り鳥, Wataridori)
18	October 25, 2016	978-4-7580-3233-9; ISBN 978-4-7580-3234-6 (limited edition)	N/A (Part of omnibus volume 9)	—
Score 102: "Out of Control" (制御不能, Seigyo Funō); Score 103: "A Great Wind" (強風, Kyōfū); Score 104: "Calling Out" (呼び声, Yobigoe); Score 105: "The White Road" (白い道, Shiroi Michi); Score 106: "Candy" (キャンディ, Kyandi)
19	April 25, 2017	978-4-7580-3269-8; ISBN 978-4-7580-3270-4 (limited edition)	May 19, 2020	978-1-975-30644-1
Score 107: "Someday, Somewhere" (いつかどこかで, Itsuka Dokoka de); Score 108: "Dear Little Sister" (妹よ, Imōto Yo); Score 109: "Onii-Chan" (お兄ちゃん, Onīchan); Score 110: "The Wandering Doctor" (放浪の医者, Hōrō no Isha); Score 111: "A Pure-White Warmth" (真っ白なぬくもり, Masshirona Nukumori)
20	October 25, 2017	978-4-7580-3316-9; ISBN 978-4-7580-3317-6 (limited edition)	N/A (Part of omnibus volume 10)	—
Score 112: "Friends" (ともだち, Tomodachi); Score 113: "The Broken Cog" (壊れた歯車, Kowareta Haguruma); Score 114: "A Wish Takes Shape" (願いのカタチ, Negai no Katachi); Score 115: "A Parting" (お別れ, Owakare); Score 116: "Punishment" (処分, Shobun)
21	April 25, 2018	978-4-7580-3343-5	March 30, 2021	978-1-975-31701-0
Score 117: "The Afternoon of the Show" (ショーの午後, Shō no Gogo); Score 118: "Links on Parade" (繋がるパレード, Tsunagaru Parēdo); Score 119: "Fated Encounter" (巡りあわせ, Meguri Awase); Score 120: "Premonition of Collapse" (崩壊の足音, Hōkai no Ashioto); Score 121: "Fluttering Wings" (羽ばたき, Habataki)
22	October 25, 2018	978-4-7580-3392-3; ISBN 978-4-7580-3344-2 (limited edition)	N/A (Part of omnibus volume 11)	—
Score 122: "Whereabouts" (ゆくえ, Yukue); Score 123: "Door of Beginnings" (始まりの扉, Hajimari no Tobira); Score 124: "Spread Your Promised Wings" (誓いの翼を広げて, Chikai no Tsubasa o Hirogete); Score 125: "Unyielding Resolve" (消えぬ決意, Kienu Ketsui); Score 126: "Scars" (傷跡, Kizuato)
23	April 25, 2019	978-4-7580-3426-5; ISBN 978-4-7580-3427-2 (limited edition)	July 27, 2021	978-1-975-32315-8
Score 127: "Rising Emotions" (満ちる想い, Michiru Omoi); Score 128: "Fragmented Memories" (記憶のかけら, Kioku no Kakera); Score 129: "Accomplices" (パートナー, Pātonā); Score 130: "Frayed Threads" (ほつれた糸, Hotsureta Ito); Score 131: "The Origin of This World" (この世界のはじまり, Kono Sekai no Hajimari)
24	October 25, 2019	978-4-7580-3468-5; ISBN 978-4-7580-3469-2 (limited edition)	N/A (Part of omnibus volume 12)	—
Score 132: "The Regulator" (調整者, Chōsei-sha); Score 133: "A Clue" (手がかり, Tegakari); Score 134: "Deep Cover" (さらなる捜査, Saranaru Sōsa); Score 135: "Rip Me Open" (この身を裂いて, Kono mi o Saite); Score 136: "Come On, Let's Go" (さあ行こう, Sāikō)
25	April 25, 2020	978-4-7580-3502-6; ISBN 978-4-7580-3503-3 (limited edition)	May 17, 2022	978-1-975-33715-5
Score 137: "Reunion" (再会, Saikai); Score 138: "The Encounter" (その出会いは, Sono Deai wa); Score 139: "Tempration" (誘い, Sasoi); Score 140: "The Allongan Village" (アロンガの村, Aronga no Mura); Score 141: "A Wish for the End of Evolution" (進化の果ての望み, Shinka no Hate no Nozomi)
26	October 24, 2020	978-4-7580-3552-1	N/A (Part of omnibus volume 13)	—
Score 142: "Only Once" (一度きりの, Ichido Kiri no); Score 143: "The Sound of the World" (世界の音, Sekai no Oto); Score 144: "A Pebble" (石ころ, Ishikoro); Score 145: "Revolution" (変革, Henkaku); Score 146: "The Unmarked Path" (標なき道, Shirube Naki Michi)
27	April 24, 2021	978-4-7580-3599-6	January 17, 2023	978-1-975-35182-3
Score 147: Mukuna Kotonoha (無垢な言の葉); Score 148: Koboreta Ondo (こぼれた温度); Score 149: Sen'nyū (潜入); Score 150: Heisa Kūkan (閉鎖空間); Score 151: Hakoniwa no so To (箱庭のそと); Score 152: Tōsō (逃走)
28	December 25, 2021	978-4-7580-3687-0	N/A (Part of omnibus volume 14)	—
Score 153: Utakata no Ohime-sama (泡沫のお姫さま); Score 154: Hajimari no Owari (はじまりの終わり); Score 155: Tairitsu suru Mono (対立する者); Score 156: Totsunyū (突入); Score 157: Tobira no Kagi (扉の鍵); Score 158: Ikenie (生贄); Score 159: Kairo (化色); Score 160: Okaeri, Tadaima (おかえり、ただいま)

=== Anime ===
An anime adaptation was announced in April 2012. The anime premiered on April 3, 2013, on ABC. It was later licensed for streaming by Funimation in North America and premiered on their streaming service April 8, 2013, at 12:35 pm EST. The anime was released by Bandai Visual on Blu-ray and DVD volumes with English subtitles, with the first volume being released on May 28, 2013. Funimation later added the English dub version in June 2014, alongside Date A Live, Red Data Girl and Code:Breaker.

The opening theme is "Henai no Rondo" (偏愛の輪舞曲) by Granrodeo while the ending theme is "Reason" by Kamiyu.

==== Episode list ====
No.	Official English title Original Japanese title	Original release date
1	"Opus 1: Rainbow Colored Flower Fuse"; Transliteration: "Nanairo Shirube Hanasen" (Japanese: なないろ導花線)	April 3, 2013
With an abandoned bracelet called a Circus I.D. in his possession, Nai is held captive by a Varuga named Miné at a mansion. Gareki infiltrates the mansion and takes Nai with him, eventually sending Miné to her grave before she attempts to devour the two. Meanwhile, Tsukumo and Hirato arrive outside the mansion where Miné has died, and they receive a call of a train hijacking. Nai and Gareki jump aboard this train to leave town, unaware of the hijacking. Just then, Tsukumo and Hirato appear as they take on their hijackers in front of Nai and Gareki. Eliška and Palnedo are held hostage by the hijackers because Palnedo had massive layoffs from his company. Tsukumo and Hirato subdue the hijackers and free Eliška and Palnedo. With the train packed with explosives, the best option is to evacuate and derail the train. However, with Nai's help, Hirato locates the signal device, while Gareki tells Hirato to disconnect the rear car in order to terminate the signal. In the aftermath, it is revealed that Palnedo purposely arranged for the train hijacking to observe how Circus would respond to the situation.
2	"Opus 2: Fortune Cat"; Transliteration: "Fōchun Kyatto" (Japanese: フォーチュンキャット)	April 10, 2013
Gareki goes into town for some food for Nai, but Nai goes off on his own. During a parade by Circus, Nai narrowly escapes from an agent of Kafka, and Gareki follows Nai in an alleyway. However, another agent suddenly incapacitates Gareki with a electroshock weapon, while the first agent captures Nai. Yogi, who first appears wearing a cat costume named Nyanperowna, easily scares off the agents. Yogi brings Nai and Gareki onto Airship Two, where Hirato explains that Miné was a Varuga, a human experiment created by Kafka. While Circus is summoned to investigate a crime, Hirato leaves Yogi and Tsukumo to guard Nai and Gareki. A game of hide-and-seek goes awry when Nai crawls into the air duct to the forest outside, where he is attacked by Varugas named Delmen and Nima. Gareki, Yogi and Tsukumo arrive to prevent Nai from being abducted. Their game of hide-and-seek finally finishes and Nai is proclaimed the winner, being brought back safely onto Airship Two by a Hitsuji, a black sheep of Airship Two's defense system. Nai is sent powerful brain waves, revealing a scene with Karoku shown in a dark greenhouse full of roses with Eliška.
3	"Opus 3: Fantasy Picnic"; Transliteration: "Maboroshi Pikunikku" (Japanese: 幻ピクニック)	April 17, 2013
After being rendered unconscious and sent to the infirmary, Nai is telepathically contacted by Karoku, who tells Nai to part ways with Gareki before he breaks. When Nai wakes up to cut ties with Gareki, the latter departs, leaving the former in tears. Ryoushi discovers that Nai is a chimera of a human and a Niji, an endangered forest creature that resides in the Rainbow Forest. Since this realization, Gareki confronts Nai for cutting ties with him, finding out that Nai was contacted by Karoku telepathically. This leads Gareki to believe that Karoku is an enigma. Nai, Gareki and Yogi go to the Research Tower for lab testing of cell infusion with Varugas, to which they are tested clean. The three are joined by Akari, as they travel to the Rainbow Forest to learn more about Nai's origins. While there, they are attacked by insect-like Varugas near a cave.
4	"Opus 4: Evening Swallow"; Transliteration: "Yoima Tsubame" (Japanese: 宵待燕)	April 24, 2013
After being swallowed by the Varugas, Gareki is saved by the serendipitous appearance of Eva. While Eva escorts Gareki away, Nai, Yogi and Akari visit Nai's former home. Meanwhile, Eliška reveals to Uro that she wanted Nai to be captured as a surprise for Karoku. After searching the home, Nai, Yogi and Akari find an old notebook full of calculations hidden behind the wall. Following a picnic by the shore, Gareki receives permission by Hirato to visit his hometown Karasuna. Nai, Gareki and Yogi all go to Karasuna, as they meet acquaintances of Gareki from two years ago. Tsubame is guilty of murder and has blackout episodes, but her twin brother Yotaka is oblivious to this. Gareki explains to Nai and Yogi that his parents sold him off to a cargo ship at eight years old, and he was later saved and raised by Tsubaki when she was alive. At night, Nai, Gareki and Yogi spot Tsubame sneaking outside. The three run outside, only to find a dead man marked with scars. They then turn around and see Yotaka with blood on his hands.
5	"Opus 5: Clown Prescription"; Transliteration: "Piero no shohōsen" (Japanese: ピエロの処方箋)	May 1, 2013
Before Yogi goes after Yotaka, he orders Gareki to escort Nai back to town, but Gareki chooses to stay since he feels like he owes a promise to his foster siblings. While running away, Nai crosses path with Tsubame, now with blood on her hands, as well as another Varuga named Meiga, who tried to apprehend her. Yogi attempts to trap Yotaka, now with black wings, in a cage of thorns, but Yotaka overpowers Yogi when the latter mentions Gareki's name. As Meiga captures Nai and Tsubame after finding them hiding in an open shed, Gareki kicks Meiga out of the blue and confronts Yotaka for his gothic looks. Meiga reveals that he is the one responsible for experimenting on both Yotaka and Tsubame, but Yotaka fully turned into a Varuga while Tsubame only had psychosomatic results. Tsubame is able to temporarily restore humanity in Yotaka through her bond as a twin. When Meiga forcefully turns Yotaka back into a monster, Yotaka asks Gareki to kill him as he prepares to choke Tsubame. However, Yotaka is suddenly impaled by Hirato's cane, and he dies happily.
6	"Opus 6: Wings of Morning Light"; Transliteration: "Asahi no Tsubasa" (Japanese: 朝陽の翼)	May 8, 2013
After Yotaka dissolves, Hirato arrives to pursue Meiga. Kiichi prevents Meiga's detached arm from attacking Yogi before departing. With Yogi badly injured, Tsubame left to mourn and Gareki withholding his feelings, this leaves Nai with a heavy heart. Meiga is restrained by Hirato, who is soon joined by Tsukitachi. Yogi explains to Tsubame of Kafka's purpose of human experimentation and Circus's resolve to strike back. Because of this, Tsubame wishes to set free since she was once a human experiment. Kiichi and Jiki find no trace of Meiga being affiliated with Kafka, reporting this to Hirato and Tsukitachi. Since Meiga will not give up any information, Hirato performs a burial on Meiga, and news of this reaches Palnedo. After Hirato, Tsukitachi, Kiichi and Jiki reunite with Nai, Gareki, Yogi and Tsubame, Tsukitachi takes Tsubame to visit her dying grandfather in a hospital, although Gareki visited there earlier. After leaving the hospital, Tsubame begs Tsukitachi to use her in order to bring Kafka down.
7	"Opus 7: "The Mermaid's Sigh" and the Three Knights"; Transliteration: "Māmeido no Tameki to Sannin no Kishi" (Japanese: マーメイドの溜息」と三人の騎士)	May 15, 2013
Gareki has locked himself in his room all week after his family incident. With an upcoming performance by Circus underway, Yogi invites Nai and Gareki to join them. During the parade, Kiichi orders Yogi, while in his cat costume, to search for a malfunctioning Usagi, a white rabbit of Airship One's defense system. Instead, Gareki is forced to put on the cat costume and act as Nyanperowna without Nai realizing the switch. Failing to track down the Usagi in the streets, Yogi and Kiichi deduce that it will show up at the plaza theater. Meanwhile at the plaza theater, a play commences with Jiki as a soldier next to Tsukumo as a mermaid in a sealed jar. The play takes a bad turn when the Usagi welds the trap door of the jar shut. Outside the plaza theater, Nai hears Tsukumo's silent sceams with his super-sensitive ears, bringing Gareki and Eva with him. Nai, Gareki and Yogi succeed in breaking the jar to save Tsukumo, while Kiichi deactivates the Usagi. Also, Eva plays the role of Jiki's ex-girlfriend to end the play. Afterwards, Akari unexpectedly meets with Hirato and Tsukitachi in his office.
8	"Opus 8: Silvery Box"; Transliteration: "Shirogane no Kushige" (Japanese: 白銀の匣)	May 22, 2013
Nai, Gareki, Yogi and Tsukumo travel to Rinoll, also known as the "City of Ice". Azana delivers a warm snowman named Yukkin, designed in the Research Tower. Back on Airship Two, Hirato, Akari and Tsukitachi discuss Nai being an experimental specimen for luring Varugas that are trying to capture him. After Nai, Gareki, Yogi and Tsukumo search through a vacation house, Yukkin becomes trapped in a hole, only to be found by Kagiri and Kiharu, responsible for covering their own tracks in the vacation house. Nai, Gareki and Yogi jump into the hole, revealed to be a man-made tunnel leading to the mansion, where they find a small box shaking on its own. Yukkin returns to Tsukumo, but Kagiri and Kiharu suddenly sneak up on her in confrontation, while Nai, Gareki and Yogi come back to the surface after Gareki creates a makeshift grenade from below. Nai and Tsukumo run away, while Gareki and Yogi continue to fight. However, Gareki and Yogi are blinded by Kagiri's gadget. After Kagiri and Kiharu beat up Yogi, his allergy patch is removed from his left cheek, causing several thorns to surround him and his hair to turn silver.
9	"Opus 9: Blue Rose"; Transliteration: "Aoi Bara" (Japanese: 蒼い薔薇)	May 29, 2013
Kiharu is prompted to retreat with Kagiri in tow when Yogi goes berserk. As Tsukumo heads back when Nai senses trouble, she runs into Kiharu, only for her to be punched out cold. After Yogi breaks Gareki out of a case of thorns, Gareki manages to revert Yogi back to normal. Nai finds them, informing that Tsukumo has been kidnapped. Tsukumo finds herself in a room while a masquerade ball hosted by Kafka is occurring. Eliška wanders off and accidentally comes across Tsukumo, who is forced to escape after Eliška lets out a scream. After Eliška runs back to Uro, he sends her to her room while expressing disappointment towards Kagiri and Kiharu. At the Research Center, Nai and Gareki tell Akari how Yogi's allergy patch is connected to his recent behavior. It is shown that Kagiri and Kiharu managed to swipe the rattling box from the recent battle in order to give it to Uro. Akari believes that the box contained part of a Varuga, and Yogi has an allergic reaction to the air dense with Varuga elements. Tsukumo enters the greenhouse and tries to apprehend Karoku, but he uses a hidden needle in his ring to poison her.
10	"Opus 10: Tears of the Wild Beast Tamer"; Transliteration: "Mōjū-shi no Namida" (Japanese: 猛獣使の泪)	June 5, 2013
Hirato revives Tsukumo from a boat floating along a river. Aboard Airship One, Kiichi and Jiki welcome Nai and Gareki, tasking them to clean up a room, though they end up using a team of Usagi to assist them. Afterwards, Nai and Gareki talk with Tsukitachi concerning Tsubame's well-being. After Jiki intimidates Gareki with his incredible speed, Nai later tells Tsukitachi that he wants to talk to Jiki, worried for Gareki's life. Yogi learns from Akari that Nai and Gareki are deployed to Vint, a wildlife reserve for rare and endangered species, though there have been many reports of poaching. Splitting into two separate groups, Gareki goes with Tsukitachi while Nai goes with Jiki. Tsukitachi explains to Gareki that incuna are omnipotent cells with dazzling effects with proper training or can bite back if not controlled. Nai and Jiki's group spots Kiripon, a cow-like Varuga, but it fights back after getting agitated. However, Yogi arrives to protect Nai, while Kiichi pursues and kills Kiripon. Yogi brings Nai and Gareki back to Airship Two, but Jiki has been given the order to stay with Nai and Gareki for awhile. At night, Gareki wonders where his real home really is.
11	"Opus 11: Ice Cream Parade"; Transliteration: "Aisukurīmu Parēdo" (Japanese: アイスクリームパレード)	June 12, 2013
As Nai, Gareki and Yogi stop by a Nyanperowna shop in Vantnam, Yogi is prompted to carry Nai and Gareki from the shop after Gareki exclaims that Nyanperowna is fake. However, Yanari, deducing that Yogi is the man inside the cat costume after following them out, tells them that he needs to find a pasta shop. Meanwhile, Akari recalls Hirato telling him that someone is leaking information from Circus. Nai, Gareki, Yogi and Yanari meet Rissun, the city mascot and guide dressed as a squirrel, who leads them in the right direction. Yogi and Gareki later protect Yanari from a Rissun impostor, who attempts to kidnap Yanari. Hirato arrives and creates a scene with Gareki, which allows Yogi to take Nai and Yanari away safely to avoid conflict. Yanari finds his mother's house, only to find out that she has died. While Hirato asks Gareki if he wants to be a child of Airship Two, Yanari is comforted by Yogi and Nai before he departs. Onboard Airship Two, Nai is contacted by Yanari, who mentions that Eliška knows Karoku. After collapsing from giving juice to Gareki, Nai later wakes up, telling Tsukumo that Karoku is at the Misty Mansion.
12	"Opus 12: The Niji's Promise"; Transliteration: "Niji no Yakusoku" (Japanese: ニジの約束)	June 19, 2013
After Hirato and Tsukitachi convince Akari to go with the plan to rescue Karoku, Gareki talks with Hirato about participating in this dangerous raid. Hirato later confirms that an encrypted transmission was sent from Airship Two by an unknown recipient. Going forward with their plan, Gareki and Yogi take over the security system of the Misty Mansion, while the rest of Circus move out to infiltrate. While Kiichi takes on Kagiri and Kiharu in the hallway, Gareki and Yogi battle Delmen and the insect-like Varugas in the forest. Tsukumo and Eva break into the mansion just as Eliška and Uro are waiting by Karoku's room. After Uro sends Eliška to her room, both Tsukumo and Eva engage in combat against Uro outside the mansion, though Uro tries to escape into the forest. Akari catches Azana deleting data from the computer, as Azana exhibits an inferiority complex and tries to convince Akari to switch over to Kafka as the superior organization. Nai and Jiki leave the roof of the mansion and hover over the forest. Nai remembers when he was a Niji as he spent time with Karoku. Nai reaches for the sky, where the forest opens a rainbow gate.
13	"Opus 13: Karneval"; Transliteration: "Kānivaru" (Japanese: カーニヴァル)	June 26, 2013
After Yogi defeats Delmen, Gareki has second thoughts of joining Circus. Hirato intervenes as Azana admits to looking up to Akari, despite Azana secretly working for Kafka. Tsukitachi finds the rattling box in the mansion, but it suddenly explodes. However, he manages to save Kiichi during her battle against Kagiri and Kiharu. While Nai, Gareki and Yogi move on towards the rainbow gate, Jiki is left to face against Nima and holds her back. Uro diffuses Tsukumo and Eva's electric cage, and Yogi is forced to keep Uro at bay. In a field, Nai and Gareki finally meet Karoku. After Nai runs up to hug Karoku, Gareki realizes that he can barely move and struggles to shout. On the ground lies the real Karoku in a death-like state. Despite Palnedo having escaped from the Misty Mansion via submarine, the mission is complete and an unconscious Karoku is brought back to the Research Center to be monitored by Akari. Gareki tells Hirato that he wants to study in order to become a member of Circus. Nai, Yogi and Tsukumo bid Gareki a sad farewell. Karoku is seen awake in the hospital bed, watching a bird fly away from his window.

=== Audio ===
A drama CD titled Karneval Circus was released on March 25, 2010, on the Frontier works label. An internet radio show premiered on January 25, 2013, on animate.tv, with Hiro Shimono, the voice of Nai as the host.
