= El Cazador de la Bruja =

Japanese anime television series

- Limited edition cover of the first DVD volume

エル・カザド (Eru Kazado)
- Genre: Girls with guns, modern Western, Yuri
- Anime television series
- Directed by: Kōichi Mashimo
- Produced by: Shigeru Kitayama; Mamiko Aoki
- Written by: Kenichi Kanemaki
- Music by: Yuki Kajiura
- Studio: Bee Train
- Licensed by: NA: Funimation Entertainment
- Original network: TV Tokyo
- English network: US: Funimation Channel
- Original run: April 2, 2007 – September 24, 2007
- Episodes: 26
- Manga
- Written by: Hirose Shū
- Published by: Akita Shoten
- Magazine: Champion Red
- Original run: March 2007 – August 2007
- Volumes: 1

El Cazador de la Bruja (エル・カザド, Eru Kazado; Spanish for The Hunter, or by its longer title, The Hunter of the Witch) is an anime television series directed by Kōichi Mashimo and animated by Bee Train studio. It is a spiritual successor of Noir and Madlax and the final installment of Bee Train's "girls-with-guns" trilogy. The series was aired on TV Tokyo from April to September in 2007. A manga adaptation was serialized in the Champion RED Magazine beginning in March 2007, and the chapters were collected into one volume.

The series was announced for North American release by Funimation on February 19, 2009. It was released in two complete season sets in early December 2009 and re-released as a complete set in March 2011. The series made its North American television debut on March 22, 2010, when it started airing on the Funimation Channel.

== Plot ==
Taking place in Latin America, a fateful encounter between Ellis, a fugitive girl with amnesia, a troubled past, and supernatural powers, and Nadie, a feisty bounty hunter, leads to the two of them traveling to Mexico together in search of the key to unlocking Ellis' past. The only clues they have are a mysterious stone given to Ellis by a fortune teller she was staying with, and Ellis' notion that she has to go south to an unknown location referred to only as Wiñay Marka.

== Characters ==
Nadie (ナディ, Nadi)
Voiced by: Shizuka Itō (Japanese); Trina Nishimura (English)
A maverick female bounty hunter and a top marksman, she holds an optimistic attitude. She was the sole survivor of an attack on her hometown. Working for Hayward, Nadie accompanies Ellis on her journey. Before killing her opponents, Nadie has a habit of saying, "If you have any last words, say them now". She is feisty and can lose her temper very easily, but she does not joke around when it comes to protecting Ellis. Her name in comes from the Spanish word nadie, meaning nobody.
Ellis (エリス, Erisu)
Voiced by: Ai Shimizu (Japanese); Maxey Whitehead (English)
A girl wanted as a suspect for Dr. Heinz Schneider's murder. She heads south in order to seek the truth of the incident, as well as to find her birthplace; based on the vague memories she holds and an old fortune teller's advice. Ellis has "Witch DNA", but her abilities are accidental and incomplete. These include superhuman strength, temporary levitation, and heating as well as freezing of physical objects. She cannot control her abilities at will, usually becoming active only in times of need. She speaks whatever is on her mind in an almost expressionless way of talking, she could almost be classified as a comic relief character because of some of the things she does. As the series progresses, it shows that Ellis feels guilty over her belief that she killed the doctor.
Jody "Blue-Eyes" Hayward (ジョディ"ブルーアイズ"ヘイワード, Jodi "Burūaizu" Heiwādo)
Voiced by: Aya Hisakawa (Japanese); Clarine Harp (English)
She first appears as an office worker in the Central Intelligence Agency, where is tasked with watching Rosenberg and uncovering information on Project LEVIATHAN. After uncovering the true nature of the project she breaks her cover and is assigned to work more directly to disrupt Rosenberg's plans. From this point on, she puts her hair down and is only referred to by her code name "Blue-Eyes".
Douglas Rosenberg (ダグラス・ローゼンバーグ, Dagurasu Rōzenbāgu)
Voiced by: Kenta Miyake (Japanese); Ian Sinclair (English)
A director in the Central Intelligence Agency and a shrewd agent, Rosenberg serves as the main antagonist of the story. He appears to have a great number of connections, using them at least once to attack Nadie and Ellis with military forces. He hired Ricardo to observe Ellis and Nadie and to subdue L.A. when he got out of control. While his true intentions and motivations never truly become clear, he always seems to be one step ahead of everyone else. He is with a young woman who he leaves to chase after Ellis. He controlled L.A. and gave him the capacity to feel.
Dr. Heinrich "Heinz" Schneider (ハインリヒ "ハインツ" シュナイダー, Hainrihi "Haintsu" Shunaidā)
Voiced by: Shinichiro Miki (Japanese); Christopher Bevins (English)
A doctor of physics, he is a German immigrant who has no family and thrives on his study. He is a key player in developing and researching "Project LEVIATHAN" and was in charge of caring for and studying Ellis during her childhood. In flashbacks, he appears to have been generally kind to Ellis.
L.A. (エル・エー, Eru Ē)
Voiced by: Mamoru Miyano (Japanese); Jamie McGonnigal (English)
A mysterious young man who is in love with and harbors a deep obsession for Ellis. He is always constantly watching her but he has a deep hatred for humans. He and Ellis are the last survivors out of the five who were artificially engineered with witch DNA. Though he doesn't have witch-like powers himself, he does possess superhuman agility and strength. He uses metal threads as a weapon.
Ricardo (リカルド, Rikarudo)
Voiced by: Fumihiko Tachiki (Japanese); Bob Carter (English)
A taciturn bounty hunter who was hired by Douglas Rosenberg. He is a retired mercenary. In the later episodes, Ricardo and Nadie find themselves working together in order to thwart Rosenberg's plans to capture Ellis. He is generally quiet and appears to desire to protect Lirio. Ricardo is teaching Lirio to use a boomerang in the last episode.
Lirio (リリオ, Ririo)
Voiced by: Marina Inoue (Japanese); Monica Rial (English)
A young girl who is being raised by Ricardo and is seen constantly following him around. Lirio seems to be very attached to both Nadie and Ellis. She is not very talkative, only speaking in episode 25.

== Media ==
=== Manga ===
A manga titled El Cazador de la Bruja by Hirose Shū started serialization in the shōnen manga magazine Champion RED on March 19, 2007. The manga finished serialization, with only one bound volume released on September 20, 2007.
