= Ninja Cadets =

1996 original video animation

Ninja者 (Ninja Mono)
- Genre: Comedy, Action
- Created by: Eiji Suganuma
- Original video animation
- Directed by: Eiji Suganuma
- Produced by: Hiroshi Tazaki; Kinya Watanabe
- Written by: Mitsuhiro Yamada
- Music by: Takeo Miratsu
- Studio: AIC, Youmex
- Licensed by: NA: AnimeWorks
- Released: March 27, 1996 – June 12, 1996
- Runtime: 29 minutes per episode
- Episodes: 2
- Light novel
- Written by: Daisuke Kawaguchi
- Illustrated by: Eiji Suganuma
- Published by: Fujimi Shobo
- Imprint: Fujimi Fantasia Bunko
- Published: May 25, 1996

Ninja Cadets, known in Japan as Ninja Mono (Ninja者), is a two-episode original video animation (OVA) anime series produced by AIC and Youmex and created by Eiji Suganuma, who also directed, storyboarded it and designed the characters. It is a comedy about a group of ninja-in-training in feudal Japan.

Ninja Cadets was released in two episodes from March 27 to June 12, 1996. It has the distinction of being the first anime DVD ever released. The series is licensed in the United States by Media Blasters under its AnimeWorks label. It is the first English anime dub ever produced by Bang Zoom! Entertainment.

== Voices ==
=== English ===
- Sandy Fox as Sakura
- Lia Sargent as Matsuri
- Michelle Ruff as Yume
- Mona Marshall as Pochi
- Lex Lang as Hayashi, Matsuzaka
- Jack Cox as Kaoru
- Beth Wernick as Jame
- Derek Stephen Prince as Nikko
- Steve Kramer as Yukinobu, Tea House Master
- Jeffrey Stackhouse as Lord Byakuro
