= List of Yotsuba&! chapters =

Cover of tankōbon volume 1, as released by ASCII Media Works in Japan on 27 August 2003

Yotsuba&! is a manga written and drawn by Kiyohiko Azuma, and published in Japan by ASCII Media Works in the monthly magazine Dengeki Daioh. The chapters have been collected in 16 tankōbon volumes, with further chapters appearing in Dengeki Daioh to be collected in tankōbon format over time. The series was licensed in English by ADV Manga, with five volumes published; volume six was scheduled to be published February 2008 but was delayed indefinitely. Yen Press announced at New York Comic Con 2009 that they had acquired the North American license for the English release of the manga; volume six was released in September 2009 along with new translations of the first five volumes, with later volumes to follow. The series has been licensed in France by Kurokawa, in Spain by Norma Editorial, in Germany by Tokyopop Germany, in Italy by Dynit, in Finland by Punainen jättiläinen, in Korea by Daiwon C.I., in Taiwan by Kadokawa Media, in Vietnam by IPM, in Indonesia by Elex Media Komputindo, and in Thailand by NED Comics.

Yotsuba&! follows the daily life of a young girl named Yotsuba Koiwai and her adoptive father, with each chapter taking place on a specific, nearly sequential day of a common year starting on Wednesday. The year was initially believed to be 2003, coinciding with the date of the manga's serialization, but Azuma has stated that the manga always takes place in the present day.

Official story dates through volume five are given by a small artbook, Yotsuba&! Illustrations and Materials, distributed in Japan with volume six and Yotsuba & Monochrome Animals; dates from volume six on are established by evidence within the series, such as statements by characters, and by statements by Azuma. The collected volumes have seven chapters each, spanning about a week in series time. The first five volumes cover a summer vacation period.

== List of volumes and chapters ==
Note: This list uses official English-translated titles through volume 15, unofficial Japanese translations thereafter.

No.	Original release date	Original ISBN	English release date	English ISBN
1	27 August 2003	978-4-8402-2466-6	6 June 2005 (ADV); September 2009 (Yen)	978-1-4139-0317-1 (ADV); 978-0-316-07387-5 (Yen)
Chapter list: 1. "Yotsuba & Moving" (よつばとひっこし, "Yotsuba to Hikkoshi"); 2. "Yotsuba & Manners" (よつばとあいさつ, "Yotsuba to Aisatsu"; "Yotsuba & Greetings"); 3. "Yotsuba & Global Warming" (よつばと地球温暖化, "Yotsuba to Chikyū Ondanka"); 4. "Yotsuba & TV" (よつばとテレビ, "Yotsuba to Terebi"); 5. "Yotsuba & Shopping" (よつばとかいもの, "Yotsuba to Kaimono"); 6. "Yotsuba & Cicadas" (よつばとせみとり, "Yotsuba to Semitori"; "Yotsuba & Cicada-Catching"); 7. "Yotsuba & Rain" (よつばとおおあめ, "Yotsuba to Ōame"; "Yotsuba & Rainstorms")			Story date: 1. 19 July; 2. 20 July (morning); 3. 20 July (afternoon); 4. 21 July; 5. 22 July; 6. 24 July; 7. 25 July	
On the last day of the spring semester, Yotsuba and her father Koiwai move into their new house and meet the neighboring Ayase girls, Asagi, Fuuka, and Ena. As the Koiwais settle in, they encounter problems, including a broken bathroom lock and Yotsuba needing to learn about polite greetings, air conditioners, and the proper uses of doorbells. Fuuka offers the Koiwais her family's old television, and when Koiwai's friend Jumbo helps carry it, the Ayases are impressed by his height. For other household goods, Koiwai takes Yotsuba shopping at a department store for the first time. Jumbo takes Yotsuba and Ena cicada-catching, and they return to show off their catch to Mrs. Ayase. The next day, after Fuuka helps Yotsuba bring in the Koiwais' forgotten laundry, Yotsuba plays in the rain.
2	27 April 2004	978-4-8402-2674-5	1 August 2005 (ADV); September 2009 (Yen)	978-1-4139-0318-8 (ADV); 978-0-316-07389-9 (Yen)
Chapter list: 8. "Yotsuba & Drawing" (よつばとおえかき, "Yotsuba to Oekaki"); 9. "Yotsuba & Revenge" (よつばと復讐, "Yotsuba to Fukushū"); 10. "Yotsuba & Cake" (よつばとケーキ, "Yotsuba to Kēki"); 11. "Yotsuba & "No Bother"" (よつばとどんまい, "Yotsuba to Donmai"; "Yotsuba & 'Don't Mind'"); 12. "Yotsuba & Pools" (よつばとプール, "Yotsuba to Pūru"); 13. "Yotsuba & the Frog" (よつばとかえる, "Yotsuba to Kaeru"); 14. "Asagi's Souvenirs" (あさぎのおみやげ, "Asagi no Omiyage"; "Asagi's Omiyage")			Story date: 8. 27 July; 9. 30 July; 10. 31 July; 11. 4 August; 12. 7 August; 13. 8 August; 14. 9 August	
Yotsuba tags along when Ena and her friend Miura go drawing in the park. After watching a gangster movie, Yotsuba takes revenge on the Ayases with her water pistol. The next day, Mrs. Ayase sends Ena, Miura, and Yotsuba to buy cake from a bakery. After working all night on a deadline, Koiwai falls asleep, leaving Yotsuba to watch the house on her own. In a failed attempt to get closer to Asagi, Jumbo takes Yotsuba, Fuuka, and Ena swimming at the pool. When Yotsuba catches a bullfrog, Ena adores it but Miura is frightened of it. Asagi returns from an Okinawa vacation with souvenirs for her family—and leftover sata andagi for Yotsuba.
3	27 November 2004	978-4-8402-2895-4	3 October 2005 (ADV); September 2009 (Yen)	978-1-4139-0329-4 (ADV); 978-0-316-07390-5 (Yen)
Chapter list: 15. "Yotsuba & Souvenirs" (よつばとおみやげ, "Yotsuba to Omiyage"); 16. "Yotsuba & Asagi" (よつばとあさぎ, "Yotsuba to Asagi"); 17. "Yotsuba & Flowers" (よつばとフラワー, "Yotsuba to Furawā"); 18. "Yotsuba & The Bon Festival" (よつばとお盆, "Yotsuba to Obon"); 19. "Yotsuba & the Elephant" (よつばとぞう, "Yotsuba to Zō"); 20. "Yotsuba & the Fireworks Show?" (よつばと花火大会?, "Yotsuba to Hanabi Taikai?"); 21. Yotsuba & the Fireworks Show! (よつばと花火大会!, "Yotsuba to Hanabi Taikai!")			Story date: 15. 10 August (daytime); 16. 10 August (evening); 17. 11 August; 18. 12 August; 19. 14 August; 20. 16 August; 21. 17 August	
To thank Asagi, Yotsuba travels to the playground for a souvenir for her and her friend Torako. In return, Asagi buys Yotsuba a package of fireworks. While helping Fuuka shop at Jumbo's flower shop, Yotsuba buys all the leftover stock for ¥10. The next day, during Obon, Koiwai sends Yotsuba, dressed as the "Flower Cupid", to give away excess flowers. The next day, Koiwai takes Yotsuba on her first visit to a zoo to see an elephant. In another attempt to get close to Asagi, Jumbo takes Yotsuba, Ena, and Miura to a fireworks show, where Yotsuba learns that crowds can be scary and that display fireworks are more impressive than firecrackers.
4	27 August 2005	978-4-8402-3163-3	27 June 2007 (ADV); September 2009 (Yen)	978-1-4139-0345-4 (ADV); 978-0-316-07391-2 (Yen)
Chapter list: 22. "Yotsuba & Challenges" (よつばと勝負, "Yotsuba to Shōbu"); 23. "Yotsuba & Fishing" (よつばと釣り, "Yotsuba to Tsuri"); 24. "Yotsuba & Dinner" (よつばとばんごはん, "Yotsuba to Bangohan"); Intermission. "Yotsuba & Four-Panel Manga" (休憩 よつばと4コマ, "Kyūkei – Yotsuba to Yon-Koma"): 25. "Yotsuba & the Bloom of Youth" (よつばとせいしゅん, "Yotsuba to Seishun"; "Yotsuba & Adolescence"); 26. "Yotsuba & Newspapers" (よつばとしんぶん, "Yotsuba to Shinbun"); 27. "Yotsuba & Tsukutsukuboshi" (よつばとつくつくぼうし, "Yotsuba to Tsukutsukubōshi")			Story date: 22. 18 August; 23. 19 August; 24. 20 August; Intermission. Several days: 25. 21 August; 26. 22 August; 27. 24 August	
To give Miura a "summer vacation memory", Jumbo takes her, Yotsuba, and Ena fishing. Koiwai and Yotsuba go shopping for dinner, but he forgets his wallet and they must borrow money from Fuuka. When Fuuka sees the boy she likes with another girl, Yotsuba tries to understand, then console, her broken heart. After Ena takes Yotsuba to radio exercises for the first time, she invites Yotsuba over for breakfast, where Yotsuba decides to become a newspaperman. Her career ends, however, when The Yotsuba Times publishes the secret of Fuuka's heartbreak to the rest of the family. After dreaming of being a tsukutsukubōshi, Yotsuba dresses up as one, only to learn that they are not summer-ending fairies but a type of cicada.
5	28 April 2006	978-4-8402-3441-2	31 October 2007 (ADV); September 2009 (Yen)	978-1-4139-0349-2 (ADV); 978-0-316-07392-9 (Yen)
Chapter list: 28. "Yotsuba & Cardbo" (よつばとダンボー, "Yotsuba to Danbō"; "Yotsuba & Danbo"); 29. "Yotsuba & Helping" (よつばとてつだい, "Yotsuba to Tetsudai"); 30. "Yotsuba & Yanda" (よつばとやんだ, "Yotsuba to Yanda"); 31. "Yotsuba & Stars" (よつばとほし, "Yotsuba to Hoshi"); 32. "Yotsuba & Rain" (よつばとあめ, "Yotsuba to Ame"); 33. "Yotsuba & Sunny Skies" (よつばとはれ, "Yotsuba to Hare"; "Yotsuba & clear weather"); 34. "Yotsuba & the Beach" (よつばとうみ, "Yotsuba to Umi"; "Yotsuba & the sea")			Story date: 28. 25 August; 29. 26 August; 30. 27 August; 31. 28 August; 32. 29 August; 33. 30 August (morning); 34. 30 August (daytime)	
When Ena and Miura make a robot costume out of cardboard boxes, Yotsuba believes it is a real robot, and Ena refuses to let Miura crush her dreams by telling her the truth. Yotsuba helps Mrs. Ayase with household chores and then meets Koiwai's kōhai, Yanda, whom she instantly dislikes. To help with Ena's homework, Jumbo takes her, Miura, Yotsuba, and Fuuka stargazing. During rainy day errands, Yotsuba misinterprets Koiwai's excuse for not going to the ocean, "There'll be jellyfish!" as a promise to go see the jellyfish, and invites Ena and Fuuka along. When she throws a tantrum, he gives in and the four spend the afternoon at the beach.
6	16 December 2006	978-4-8402-3702-4	September 2009	978-0-316-07324-0
Chapter list: 35. "Yotsuba & Recycling" (よつばとリサイクル, "Yotsuba to Risaikuru"); 36. "Yotsuba & Bicycles" (よつばとじてんしゃ, "Yotsuba to Jitensha"); 37. "Yotsuba & Pottering Around" (よつばとポタリング, "Yotsuba to Potaringu"); 38. "Yotsuba & Friday" (よつばときんようび, "Yotsuba to Kin'yōbi"); 39. "Yotsuba & Milk" (よつばとぎゅうにゅう, "Yotsuba to Gyūnyū"); 40. "Yotsuba & Delivering" (よつばとはいたつ, "Yotsuba to Haitatsu"); 41. "Yotsuba & the Bookshelf" (よつばとほんだな, "Yotsuba to Hondana")			Story date: 35. 31 August; 36. 1 September; 37. 2 September; 38. 5 September; 39. 7 September; 40. 8 September; 41. 11 September	
On the last day of summer vacation, as Miura desperately finishes her homework, Yotsuba gives herself the assignment of constructing a utility shirt out of recycled materials. Koiwai takes Yotsuba shopping for a bicycle. After a few falls, she learns to ride it and uses it to accompany Asagi and Torako on an errand. Yotsuba tries out more careers, first as an office worker by writing memos, then as a milkman, delivering a bottle of milk to Fuuka at her high school. For riding off without permission, Koiwai takes away her bicycle privileges, but after she helps him and Jumbo build some bookshelves, he restores them.
7	27 September 2007	978-4-8402-4053-6	15 December 2009	978-0-316-07325-7
Chapter list: 42. "Yotsuba & Telephones" (よつばとでんわ, "Yotsuba to Denwa"); 43. "Yotsuba & Respect for the Aged Day" (よつばとけいろうのひ, "Yotsuba to Keirō no Hi"); 44. "Yotsuba & Fever" (よつばとねつ, "Yotsuba to Netsu"); 45. "Yotsuba & the Pâtissier" (よつばとぱちしえ, "Yotsuba to Pachishie"); 46. "Yotsuba & Errands" (よつばとおつかい, "Yotsuba to Otsukai"); 47. "Yotsuba & Taking Off" (よつばとしゅっぱつ, "Yotsuba to Shuppatsu"); 48. "Yotsuba & the Ranch" (よつばとぼくじょう, "Yotsuba to Bokujō")			Story date: 42. uncertain 43. 15 September; 44. 18 September; 45. uncertain 46. uncertain 47. 25 September (morning); 48. 25 September (daytime)	
Ena and Miura show Yotsuba how to make a paper-cup telephone, which they string between Koiwai's office and Fuuka's bedroom, and then take her on a bike ride to the playground of their elementary school. Because of Yotsuba's continuing interest in how milk is produced, Koiwai plans a trip to a farm, but this is put off when she gets a fever. Yotsuba helps Fuuka and Fuuka's classmate (Hiwatari, nicknamed Miss Stake) bake an elaborate cake as practice for their school cultural festival. When Koiwai wants instant ramen for lunch, Yotsuba insists on running the errand by herself for the first time. Koiwai, Jumbo, and Yanda take Yotsuba on her long-delayed farm visit, where she meets sheep and learns how to milk a cow.
8	27 August 2008	978-4-04-867151-4	20 April 2010	978-0-316-07327-1
Chapter list: 49. "Yotsuba & Opposites" (よつばとあべこべ, "Yotsuba to Abekobe"); 50. "Yotsuba & the Restaurant" (よつばとれすとらん, "Yotsuba to Resutoran"); 51. "Yotsuba & the Cultural Festival" (よつばと文化祭, "Yotsuba to Bunkasai"); 52. "Yotsuba & the Typhoon" (よつばとたいふう, "Yotsuba to Taifū"); 53. "Yotsuba & Watching the House" (よつばとるすばん, "Yotsuba to Rusuban"); 54. "Yotsuba & the Festival" (よつばとおまつり, "Yotsuba to Omatsuri"); 55. "Yotsuba & Acorns" (よつばとどんぐり, "Yotsuba to Donguri")			Story date: 49. 26 September; 50. 27 September; 51. 28 September; 52. Weekday, date uncertain 53. 2 October; 54. 4 October; 55. 6 October	
Still excited from her trip to the dairy farm, Yotsuba brings the Ayases a souvenir of butter toffees and is fascinated by Mrs. Ayase's mail-order catalog. The next day, Mrs. Ayase tells Koiwai about the cart-pulling festival the following week, while Yotsuba confuses him with her "opposites game." When he takes Yotsuba out for lunch, Yotsuba runs into Torako and manages to order for herself. Yotsuba and Koiwai attend the cultural festival at Fuuka's high school, where Yotsuba is disappointed with the plain pound cake her class serves. Yotsuba is excited by her first typhoon, and insists on going next door in the torrential downpour. When Fuuka warns her that she will fly away in the wind, Yotsuba goes back outside to test this. Jumbo babysits Yotsuba while Koiwai is out, and when Yanda shows up to eat his instant ramen, he helps Yotsuba defends the house from the "intruder". Yotsuba and Ena help pull a children's cart in the aforementioned festival, where Yotsuba is visibly impressed by the happi, the taiko drum, Jumbo's tengu costume, exposed butts, and the amount of candy she receives. Koiwai takes Yotsuba shopping for autumn clothes, but when they pass a park she insists on collecting as many acorns as she can.
9	27 November 2009	978-4-04-868247-3	21 December 2010	978-0-316-12679-3
Chapter list: 56. "Yotsuba & Schedules" (よつばとよてい, "Yotsuba to Yotei"); 57. "Yotsuba & Juralumin" (よつばとジュラルミン, "Yotsuba to Jurarumin"); 58. "Yotsuba & Coffee" (よつばとコーヒー, "Yotsuba to Kōhī"); 59. "Yotsuba & Yakiniku" (よつばとやきにく, "Yotsuba to Yakiniku"); 60. "Yotsuba & the Visitor" (よつばとらいきゃく, "Yotsuba to Raikyaku"); 61. "Yotsuba & Hot Air Balloons" (よつばとききゅう, "Yotsuba to Kikyū"); 62. "Yotsuba & the Sky" (よつばとそら, "Yotsuba to Sora")			Story date: 56. 7 October; 57. 8 October; 58. 9 October; 59. 10 October; 60. 11 or 12 October; 61. the next day (morning); 62. the same day (afternoon)	
While Koiwai works, Yotsuba plans out a schedule for the day, but immediately falls behind and plays with her acorns instead. The next day, Dad takes Yotsuba shopping for a coffee maker at a mall, and while there buys Yotsuba her first teddy bear, which she names Juralumin. The next day, she shows Juralumin to the Ayases, who give Yotsuba Ena's old wagon to carry it in. To help Fuuka study, Yotsuba brings her a mug of her father's coffee, but spills it on the table. One of Jumbo's customers invites him to her yakiniku shop's half-off night, and he brings Yanda and Koiwai along. When Yotsuba again drops the coffee she tries to bring to Fuuka, the Ayase sisters visit her house. While there, they clean up and Asagi invites Yotsuba and Koiwai along to a hot air balloon festival the next day. The Koiwais, Asagi, Ena, and Torako get up before dawn to drive to the festival, where they watch the balloons inflate and take off on a race. After breakfast, they ride in a balloon, play with hand helicopters, and collect candy thrown by a paraglider.
10	27 November 2010	978-4-04-870143-3	25 October 2011	978-0-316-19033-6
Chapter list: 63. "Yotsuba & Playtime" (よつばとあそぶ, "Yotsuba to Asobu"); 64. "Yotsuba & Pancakes" (よつばとホットケーキ, "Yotsuba to Hottokēki"); 65. "Yotsuba & Jumbo" (よつばとジャンボ, "Yotsuba to Janbo"); 66. "Yotsuba & the Electronics Store" (よつばとでんきや, "Yotsuba to Denkiya"); 67. "Yotsuba & Home Appliances" (よつばとかでん, "Yotsuba to Kaden"); 68. "Yotsuba & Lies" (よつばとうそ, "Yotsuba to Uso"); 69. "Yotsuba & the Re-encounter" (よつばとさいかい, "Yotsuba to Saikai")			Story date: 63. 13 or 14 October; 64. 15 October; 65. later that day 66. 16 October; 67. the same day 68. date uncertain 69. date uncertain	
While Koiwai works, Yotsuba plays house with her wooden blocks, then talks her father into a game of hide and seek and playing on the swings in the park. Inspired by a picture book, Yotsuba learns how to cook pancakes from her father, with assistance from Yanda. That evening, the Koiwais show Jumbo photographs from the hot air balloon festival. While her father finishes an assignment, Jumbo babysits Yotsuba and gives her a book about animals. The next day, Jumbo takes the Koiwais shopping for a digital camera. While the adults compare cameras, Yotsuba explores the electronics store with Fuuka. When Yotsuba lies about breaking some dishes, Koiwai takes her to a guardian Niō statue at a Buddhist temple to scare the "lying bug" out of her. When Yotsuba and Ena visit Miura's apartment, Yotsuba is upset when she sees her empty cardboard robot costume. Ena leaves the room with Yotsuba to resurrect the robot, and a costumed Miura plays with them in the park.
11	26 November 2011	978-4-04-886097-0	25 September 2012	978-0-316-22539-7
Chapter list: 70. "Yotsuba & Udon" (よつばとうどん, "Yotsuba to Udon"); 71. "Yotsuba & Pizza" (よつばとピザ, "Yotsuba to Piza"); 72. "Yotsuba & Soap Bubbles" (よつばとしゃぼんだま, "Yotsuba to Shabondama"); 73. "Yotsuba & Harvest of Chestnuts" (よつばとくりひろい, "Yotsuba to Kurihiroi"); 74. "Yotsuba & Cameras" (よつばとカメラ, "Yotsuba to Kamera"); 75. "Yotsuba & Friends" (よつばとともだち, "Yotsuba to Tomodachi"); 76. "Yotsuba & ..." (よつばと......, "Yotsuba to ......")			Story date: 70. 20 October; 71. date uncertain 72. 23 October; 73. 25 or 26 October; 74. date uncertain 75. date uncertain 76. Weekday, date uncertain	
Yotsuba goes to an udon shop without her father's knowledge, and is allowed to watch udon being made. After getting a pizza menu in the mail, the Koiwais order a couple, though one turns out to be too much for Yotsuba to hold. After an announcement of an upcoming camping trip, Yanda arrives with various bubble-blowing devices, which they play inside, then outside, with. Yotsuba, Fuuka, and Miss Stake (Fuuka's classmate from chapter 45) go to a shrine to pick chestnuts, and Yotsuba learns about burr covers and bug infestations. Koiwai gives Yotsuba her own camera, which she uses to go around taking pictures of people. Yotsuba meets Miura at her apartment building, and they go to Ena's. On the way, a dog grabs her teddy bear and shakes it, making it smell like dog, so they wash it and dry it at the Ayases'. As a result, the bear's ability to speak is broken, so Asagi offers to repair it overnight. Yotsuba spends much of the intervening time sulking about Juralumin's absence until Yanda finally gets a reaction out of her. She goes to the Ayases', where she finds Juralumin repaired.
12	9 March 2013	978-4-04-891352-2	19 November 2013	978-0-316-32232-4
Chapter list: 77. "Yotsuba & Torako" (よつばととらこ, "Yotsuba to Torako"); 78. "Yotsuba & Blue" (よつばとあおいろ, "Yotsuba to Aoiro"); 79. "Yotsuba & Helmet" (よつばとヘルメット, "Yotsuba to Herumetto"); 80. "Yotsuba & Halloween" (よつばとハロウィン, "Yotsuba to Harowin"); 81. "Yotsuba & Camping (1)" (よつばとキャンプ(前), "Yotsuba to Kyanpu (Zen)"); 82. "Yotsuba & Camping (2)" (よつばとキャンプ(後), "Yotsuba to Kyanpu (Kō)")			Story date: 77. Weekday, date uncertain 78. 30 October; 79. 30 October; 80. 31 October; 81. 1 November; 82. 1 November	
A short opening sequence shows Yotsuba drawing Danbo in chalk on the street before noticing migrating geese flying overhead. She welcomes Torako to the Ayase household where she shows off her photographs and learns to tie a bow. After arriving to the flower shop too late to help Jumbo paint a desk, Yotsuba finds a can of blue paint in the shoe rack at home and paints a kitchen table while her dad is working, staining her hands and leaving drips and blue footprints throughout the house. She futilely tries to clean up the mess and is confronted by her dad, who laughs instead of scolding her. Before Mr. Koiwai shows her how to use paint thinner, they go to the grocery to purchase ingredients for mapo tofu and a helmet from the bike shop. On Halloween, Fuuka and Miss Stake dress Yotsuba as a pumpkin, explaining how to ask for candy before also dressing in costume to go trick-or-treating together. Early the next morning, Miura's mom and Ena's parents see them off for a camping trip organized by Jumbo and Koiwai. Yotsuba is unpleasantly surprised to learn that Yanda has invited himself along, but ends up laughing at his jokes on the journey. At the campsite, the girls help pitch the tent, rest in a hammock, and cook curry for lunch. For dinner, they grill the meat given as a present by the parents and Yotsuba wakes early the next day, surprised by the sunrise simultaneous with the moonset.
13	27 November 2015	978-4-04-865594-1	24 May 2016	978-0-316-31921-8
Chapter list: 83. "Yotsuba & Sticks and Stuff" (よつばとえだなど, "Yotsuba to Eda Nado"); 84. "Yotsuba & Sandbox" (よつばとすなば, "Yotsuba to Sunaba"); 85. "Yotsuba & Night" (よつばとよる, "Yotsuba to Yoru"); 86. "Yotsuba & Souvenirs" (よつばとおみやげ, "Yotsuba to Omiyage"); 87. "Yotsuba & Cleaning" (よつばとそうじ, "Yotsuba to Sōji"); 88. "Yotsuba & Grandma" (よつばとばーちゃん, "Yotsuba to Bā-chan"); 89. "Yotsuba & The Black Ghost" (よつばとくろいおばけ, "Yotsuba to Kuroi Obake"); 90. "Yotsuba & All Day Long" (よつばといちにち, "Yotsuba to Ichinichi")			Story date: 83. 2 November; 84. 4 November; 85. 4 November; 86. 5 November; 87. 6 November; 88. 6 November; 89. 7 November; 90. 8 November	
Yotsuba heads over to the Ayase house early in the morning, where she shows off her souvenirs and demonstrates the sleeping bag for Asagi. Because her dad says he is too busy, Yotsuba bullies Fuuka into taking her to the park, where they meet her friend Mii and play in the sandbox, making taiyaki and pudding with sand molds. After her dad puts her to bed, Yotsuba wakes up and explores the dark house before finding her father working. The next morning, Ena helps Yotsuba decorate the house for her grandmother's visit before Yotsuba and her father meet her grandmother at the train station, who Yotsuba attempts to greet with a headbutt. Once they are home, Yotsuba receives souvenirs from her grandma. In the morning, Yotsuba helps her grandmother clean the street in front of the house and later, they clean the house once her grandmother believes Yotsuba is taking cleaning seriously. Yotsuba and her grandmother practice origami with Ena and run errands together before her grandmother has to leave, which Yotsuba attempts to prevent by hiding her luggage. The next day, Yotsuba is sweeping the street in front of the house when Yanda arrives and helps himself to the grilled onigiri Yotsuba had made with her grandmother; at bedtime, Koiwai transforms into Sleepyman to put Yotsuba to sleep.
14	28 April 2018	978-4-04-893705-4	13 November 2018	978-1-9753-2818-4
Chapter list: 91. "Yotsuba & Work" (よつばとしごと, "Yotsuba to Shigoto"); 92. "Yotsuba & Yoga" (よつばとヨガ, "Yotsuba to Yoga"); 93. "Yotsuba & Princess" (よつばとおひめさま, "Yotsuba to Ohime-sama"); 94. "Yotsuba & The Day Before" (よつばとまえのひ, "Yotsuba to Mae no Hi"); 95. "Yotsuba & Harajuku" (よつばとはらじゅく, "Yotsuba to Harajuku"); 96. "Yotsuba & Yoyogi Park" (よつばとよよぎこうえん, "Yotsuba to Yoyogi kōen"); 97. "Yotsuba & Lunch" (よつばとランチ, "Yotsuba to Ranchi")			Story date: 91. date uncertain 92. date uncertain 93. date uncertain 94. 22 November; 95. 23 November; 96. 23 November; 97. 23 November	
After helping Koiwai move a new table upstairs, Jumbo presents Yotsuba with a set of beads; an intense necklace-making session ensues for the trio. Miss Stake invites Fuuka and Yotsuba to join her for a free trial session of yoga; as the older girls struggle, Yotsuba exhibits astonishing flexibility. Yotsuba reads the story of Cinderella; inspired, she ties ribbons to her hair and is infuriated when Koiwai fails to see her fancy long hair. Going next door, Asagi immediately recognizes her as a princess and makes a fancy dress for Yotsuba using plastic trash bags; after she returns home for her bead necklace, Koiwai makes up for his earlier faux pas by asking the self-proclaimed Princess Zapunzel for a dance. The day before their trip to Tokyo, Yotsuba asks her neighbors and friends for places to go; Mother Ayase suggests Ginza, Asagi suggests Shibuya and Shinjuku, Ena suggests Tokyo Tower, and Fuuka suggests Harajuku specifically to eat crepes, which she calls stylish. Torako suggests Daikanyama but then gloomily asserts there are no fun places for kids in Tokyo. To prepare for their trip, Koiwai buys a smartphone and Yotsuba accompanies him to buy a sushi dinner at the market. Jumbo and Yanda visit later that evening to help Koiwai with his new phone and ask Yotsuba where she would like to visit when they arrive in Tokyo. At the train station, Yotsuba helps Koiwai buy a ticket and they board a train to Ikebukuro Station, where they transfer to the JR East Yamanote Line. The pair stop in Harajuku for cotton candy and crepes, and then Koiwai gets a text message from his sister Koharuko suggesting they all meet in Yoyogi Park. At the park, Yotsuba spies on three women dressed as aliens, who she successfully convinces to not destroy the earth. Koharuko reminds Yotsuba they traveled to Tokyo to pick up Koiwai's new car, a Mini convertible, and takes them to a buffet at a luxury hotel restaurant for lunch. After a filling meal, Yotsuba and Koiwai set off for the highway in their new car.
15	27 February 2021	978-4-04-913597-8	28 September 2021	978-1-9753-3609-7
Chapter list: 98. "Yotsuba & Socks" (よつばとくつした, "Yotsuba to Kutsushita"); 99. "Yotsuba & Banana Juice" (よつばとバナナジュース, "Yotsuba to Bananajūsu"); 100. "Yotsuba & Rocks" (よつばといし, "Yotsuba to Ishi"); 101. "Yotsuba & Cramming" (よつばとしけんべんきょう, "Yotsuba to Shiken Benkyō"); 102. "Yotsuba & Paints" (よつばとえのぐ, "Yotsuba to Enogu"); 103. "Yotsuba & Books" (よつばとほん, "Yotsuba to Hon"); 104. "Yotsuba & Backpack" (よつばとランドセル, "Yotsuba to Randoseru")			Story date: 98. date uncertain 99. December; 100. date uncertain 101. date uncertain 102. date uncertain 103. date uncertain 104. date uncertain	
Koiwai announces the time has come to set out the kotatsu, and Yotsuba helps pick up loose items around the room. Yanda convinces Koiwai to purchase a blender, and teaches Yotsuba a simple recipe for banana smoothies. He frightens her by yelling the blender will explode, but after tasting the smoothie, Yotsuba forgives him. On their way to the seashore to collect rocks, Yotsuba and Koiwai run into Ena and Miura; the two older girls are excited to join the rock-collecting expedition. The first spot they pick turns out to be a sandy beach with few rocks, but a strange man directs them to a better location where they collect many smooth and interesting rocks. At the Ayase household, while comparing rocks with Ena, Yotsuba is lured away by the snacks Fuuka brought to her cram session with Miss Stake. Fuuka prepares a short test for Yotsuba as a break from her studies, and Miss Stake demonstrates origami for Yotsuba as well; at 4:30 pm, Yotsuba returns to her home, and the teens resume their studies, only to discover that Yotsuba has eaten all the snacks. After Yotsuba watches Ena paint a birthday card for a friend, she begs her father for a paint set, and they go to an art supply store with Jumbo. Jumbo selects a set for her and Yotsuba paints an ocean for the mermaid princess. When Yanda arrives, Jumbo and Koiwai pretend to have died as a joke. Later, Yanda sees Yotsuba's painting of the ocean and asks if he could sell it and quit his job. Yotsuba gets a haircut; the stylist offers a picture book as a distraction, but Yotsuba insists on a glossy magazine featuring sushi instead. They buy bread from a new bakery on the way home, but Yotsuba is disappointed by the lack of cream filling. Yotsuba illustrates her own picture book entitled Sunday featuring herself as the Sparkle Princess, who defeats a monster that destroyed the world, then goes to school with a backpack. In a good mood because her exams are finished, Fuuka is humming but is criticized by her sisters and mother as atonal; she is sent by her mother to the Koiwai house with apples. There, she is greeted by Yotsuba and directed to sit down for a haircut, which she selects from a book illustrated by Yotsuba that pairs foods and hair styles. Shocked that Koiwai has not purchased a backpack for Yotsuba, Fuuka coaches him to call his mother, who immediately offers to pay for it. At the store, Yotsuba chooses a red backpack and as she models it for Fuuka, Koiwai realizes that Yotsuba will start school in a few months and remembers a story he told when he went camping with Jumbo and Yanda: he didn't feel like a father until Yotsuba began talking and calling him "Daddy". He is overcome with emotion and Yotsuba vows to protect him, mistaking his tears for physical pain.
16	26 February 2025	978-4-04-916194-6	20 January 2026	979-8-8554-2581-9
Chapter list: 105. "Yotsuba & Christmas Tree" (よつばとクリスマスツリー, "Yotsuba to Kurisumasu Tsurii"); 106. "Yotsuba & The Cafeteria" (よつばとしょくどう, "Yotsuba to Shokudō"); 107. "Yotsuba & Getting Along" (よつばとなかよく, "Yotsuba to Nakayoku"); 108. "Yotsuba & Mt. Takao" (よつばとたかおさん, "Yotsuba to Takao-san"); 109. "Yotsuba & The Mountain and the River" (よつばとやまとかわ, "Yotsuba to Yama to Kawa"); 110. "Yotsuba & The Summit" (よつばとてっぺん, "Yotsuba to Teppen"); 111. "Yotsuba & Hobbies" (よつばとしゅみ, "Yotsuba to Shumi"); 112. "Yotsuba & Teacher" (よつばとせんせい, "Yotsuba to Sensei")			Story date: 105. December; 106. December; 107. date uncertain 108. date uncertain 109. date uncertain 110. date uncertain 111. date uncertain 112. date uncertain	
While Koiwai's sister Koharuko takes lunch with a coworker, she remarks her brother is clueless about Christmas decorations and shops for a "star-shaped" tree topper gift. Meanwhile, an exhausted Koiwai watches Yotsuba ride her bike, proud she no longer needs training wheels. She pauses to ask Koiwai about the clouds and an enthusiastic boy replies they are altocumulus or "sheep" clouds. They go to the bike shop together so her bike can be fitted with a kickstand; there, she sees the shop's Christmas tree and helps herself to one of the snacks decorating it. While installing the kickstand, the shopowner encourages them to spend time together now, since after she enters grade school, they will have less free time. After returning home, Koiwai brings out a small artificial tree, which they put up together. He also brings out a small box of ornaments, which were a gift from Koharuko, and delegates the decoration to Yotsuba, then retires to nap under the kotatsu. As he drifts off to sleep, he begins thinking of places they could go together. At the playground, Jumbo and Koiwai discuss possible destinations while seated on play animals and decide on a hiking trip to Mount Takao. In the meantime, Yotsuba has taken a lunch order from the pair and advises them that since everything is prepared from scratch, it may take some time for their food to arrive. Koiwai and Yotsuba find that Yanda has welcomed himself inside their home, and he starts proposing that Koiwai make the place his secret hideout. Koiwai tells Yotsuba that they can only go on the hiking trip if Yanda, another adult, joins them, and if Yotsuba and Yanda can somehow get along. The archenemies reluctantly agree, and they set out for the adventure early the next day. Upon arriving, Yanda tells Yotsuba about what a chairlift is, and Koiwai determines that they climb route six to the summit, eat homemade bento for lunch, and ride the chairlift back down. Back at the Ayases', Fuuka wishes for a hobby; Yotsuba first floats banana smoothies before informing Fuuka that eating sweets would fit her best. Joining Ena and Miura at school, Yotsuba is taught horizontal bar moves such as laundry by P.E. teacher Ayumu Kasuga, called Miss Osaka on account of her accent. Impressed, Yotsuba commits herself to studying to become a professor so she can turn her father into a rhinoceros beetle.

== Chapters not collected in tankōbon format ==
The following chapters published in Dengeki Daioh have not yet been collected in a tankōbon volume. The dates refer to the magazine's numbering rather than the actual release date.
