= List of Yotsuba&! characters =

This is a list of characters from the manga series Yotsuba&! by Kiyohiko Azuma.

The series follows the daily life of an energetic, cheerful five-year-old girl named Yotsuba Koiwai, who lives with her adoptive father, and her interactions with her neighbors and other acquaintances.

== Koiwai household ==
=== Yotsuba Koiwai ===
Yotsuba Koiwai (小岩井 よつば, Koiwai Yotsuba) is depicted as an energetic five-year-old girl with a child's wonder towards the world. She is infectiously enthusiastic about nearly everything. Before moving to their present house, she and Koiwai used to live with his mother, and before that on an island that is, according to Yotsuba, "to the left". Almost nothing is known about her biological parentage other than that she was orphaned somewhere outside Japan and then adopted by Koiwai. Hence, people often think she is a foreigner. She is an excellent swimmer and enjoys drawing, although others only praise her art to avoid hurting her feelings.

The name "Yotsuba" (よつば) can be translated as "four leaved clover," and is part of the phrase yotsuba no kurōbā (四葉のクローバー, "four-leaf clover"). Her green hair is always styled into four pigtails (even at bedtime), similarly to her namesake.

=== Yousuke Koiwai ===
Yousuke Koiwai (小岩井 葉介, Koiwai Yousuke) is Yotsuba's adoptive father. The manga avoids the subject of her adoption or even her birth parents. When his neighbor Fuuka asks, he tells her that he found Yotsuba while visiting a foreign country and decided to adopt her and bring her back to Japan, with no further details. Although he often casually tells people that Yotsuba is a weirdo, he can be very offbeat and silly himself. He is depicted as a youthful dad with the carefree lifestyle of a slacker. Most times he is reserved and keeps to himself. He usually wears an undershirt and boxer shorts while at home, and apologizes when people see him in his "irresponsible" clothes. He works at home as a freelance translator, although the materials he translates are not described. When he does leave the house, usually shopping or with friends, he often brings Yotsuba. Despite his laid-back personality and playful behavior, Koiwai does aim to be a good father and proper role model to Yotsuba and punishes her if he feels she has done something warranting it.

== Ayase household ==
The Ayase family lives next-door to the Koiwais.

=== Asagi Ayase ===
In her twenties and the oldest of the three Ayase sisters, Asagi Ayase (綾瀬 あさぎ, Ayase Asagi) lives at home while attending a nearby university. She is depicted as a very attractive young woman who enjoys creating mischief and teasing people, especially her parents; her friend Torako once called her a horrible person for manipulating Ena. She often teases Yotsuba for entertainment, although not maliciously. Her mother claims Asagi was very much like Yotsuba when she was young. Mrs. Ayase is puzzled how such a cute child could turn out to be a delinquent, much to Asagi's annoyance. Asagi's irreverence may have come from her mother's teasing when she was a child. For example, in the past when Asagi presented Mrs. Ayase with a four-leaf clover, her mother asked for a five-leaf clover instead. Unable to locate one, young Asagi was reduced to tears. Yotsuba often refers to her as the "Pretty one".

=== Fuuka Ayase ===
The middle Ayase sister, Fuuka Ayase (綾瀬 風香, Ayase Fūka; also Fuka Ayase) is sixteen years old and in her second year of high school. She appears to be the most dependable and responsible of the sisters. Fuuka usually buys the groceries and is active in the community. During Yotsuba's eventful first visit to her school, one student calls her "vice-president." Fuuka often finds herself going out of her way to help out the Koiwais, even though she does not really intend to do so. Besides Jumbo, she has observed the Koiwais' eccentricities and oddball tendencies more than anyone else. Other characters often lightly ridicule her for making bad puns and wearing T-shirts with strange pictures on them (such as Chiyo's "father" from Azumanga Daioh, who also appears as a plushie in her room and as a keychain on her bag). Yotsuba has referred to her as "the one who is not pretty", much to Fuuka's dismay.

=== Ena Ayase ===
The youngest Ayase sister, Ena Ayase (綾瀬 恵那, Ayase Ena) is about ten years old and goes to a nearby elementary school. As the one closest to Yotsuba's age, she and her best friend Miura play with Yotsuba most frequently. Ena is generally well-liked and is arguably the most earnestly kind character of the series. She tries to be eco-friendly by telling people about the negative effects of global warming, limiting her use of air conditioning, and teaching Yotsuba the benefits of recycling. Appreciative, level-headed and smart, she serves as a big sister figure to Yotsuba. However, her attempts to spare the five-year-old's fragile feelings sometimes lead her to say little white lies, like praising Yotsuba's unspectacular drawings or letting Yotsuba believe that her friend Miura (concealed in a cardboard costume) is a real robot named Cardbo (in ADV's translation) or Danbo (in Yen's translation) (ダンボー, Danbō), often landing herself and Miura in trouble as a result. While she is rather patient, she occasionally loses her temper. During her free time, Ena often sketches (she has very good drawing skills) or plays with her finely-dressed teddy bears. Eager and willing to try out new experiences, Ena is not squeamish and even enthusiastic about activities like holding large frogs and cleaning out live fish. Yotsuba once referred to her as the "small one".

=== Mrs. Ayase ===
Mrs. Ayase (綾瀬家の母, Ayase-ke no Haha) is the mother of the Ayase sisters. She frequently has Yotsuba over as a guest and even tells her to visit them every day. Yotsuba's habit of calling her "Mom" is due to her generosity (she is fond of giving Yotsuba treats because she likes to watch her eat) and tolerant nature (she doesn't mind Yotsuba soaking her with a water pistol then acting dead to play the part). Nostalgia might be the reason why she dotes on Yotsuba so much, since during Yotsuba's visits she often reminisces about Asagi's younger years (cuter and better days according to her). Asagi exasperates her constantly, although her husband comments that the two have very similar personalities, which both deny. She likes ice creams, cakes, and other sugary desserts. Yotsuba likes to come over to have them, since they're always in the fridge – much to Mr. Koiwai's embarrassment and disapproval.

=== Mr. Ayase ===
Mr. Ayase (綾瀬家の父, Ayase-ke no Chichi) is the father of the three sisters. He is almost never seen at home, particularly during the regular workweek. While his profession is not yet revealed, it seems to be some sort of salaryman. Asagi teases him about his constant absences, even sometimes referring to him in the past tense as if he is dead. Still, Mr. Ayase is on very good terms with his family; he dotes on Ena and tries to protect Fuuka. Fuuka and Ena seem to take after his personality: laid-back, congenial, optimistic, and sentimental. Yotsuba seems to treat him with extra respect, although he, like the other Ayases, treats her as family.

== Supporting characters ==
=== Takashi "Jumbo" Takeda ===
Takashi Takeda (竹田 隆, Takeda Takashi) is a friend of Yousuke Koiwai and has known Koiwai since they were children. He dwarfs the other characters at 210 centimeters (6 ft 11 in), especially Yotsuba. He is always referred to as "Jumbo" (ジャンボ, Janbo) and works as a florist at his father's flower shop, which Yotsuba and Fuuka only discover through chance. Jumbo helps the Koiwais move in and frequently visits their house (usually with gifts for Yotsuba such as ice cream), and Yotsuba more or less sees him as family. He tends to make deadpan jokes that go over the heads of the younger children, like Yotsuba and Ena, but he means well. At the same time, he is rather impulsive, and often goes all-out in organizing impromptu activities for the younger children such as catching cicadas, fishing and star-gazing. He also develops a deep infatuation with Asagi at first meeting, but is too shy and awkward around beautiful women to directly act upon it. As a result, he often takes advantage of Yotsuba's relationship with Asagi, but due to Yotsuba's naïveté, these schemes are never effective.

=== Miura Hayasaka ===
Ena's close friend and classmate who lives in a nearby high-rise condo. Miura Hayasaka (早坂 みうら, Hayasaka Miura) is tomboyish and brusque, in both her appearance and speech (this is very noticeable in the Japanese version; see gender differences in spoken Japanese). She wears short hair and boyish clothes, such as sports jerseys. She has an active nature – for instance, she can ride a unicycle and likes to wear roller shoes. Most of the time, she is frank and tends to reply in a tsukkomi-like manner when she feels wronged or ridiculed. Miura also sometimes teases Yotsuba, even up to the point where Yotsuba is on the verge of tears, though Ena is always on hand to smooth things over. In the end, she is good at heart and the three are good friends. Miura is very squeamish. Unlike Ena, she hated the sight of gutting the fish and was scared by a large frog that Yotsuba caught.

=== Torako ===
Torako (虎子) is a close friend of Asagi who also attends the same university as her. The two frequently plan trips and hang out together. Focused on being 'cool', Torako smokes cigarettes constantly and is very skinny. Her name means "tiger" (虎, tora) "girl" (子, ko) and Yotsuba enjoys calling her just Tora ("tiger"). She is fond of taking photos on her old SLR camera. Jumbo has yet to meet Torako and was quite apprehensive, assuming that she was male and Asagi's boyfriend. Generally humorless and no-nonsense, Torako was annoyed by Yotsuba at first, but she ended up liking her and now considers being around her "fun."

=== Yanda (Yasuda) ===
Yasuda (安田), who is always referred to as "Yanda" (やんだ), is a friend of Koiwai and Jumbo. Though he is mentioned in the first and fourth chapters, when Jumbo calls Yanda "no good" for making lame excuses for not helping the Koiwais move, he does not appear until chapter 30. He is childish, as shown by the petty pranks he plays on Yotsuba, including bribing her with candy then taking it back when it does not work and prank-calling her. He enjoys teasing Yotsuba and acting as her "nemesis". Koiwai refers to Yanda as his kōhai, junior, but in what context he is Koiwai's junior is unknown. He lives from paycheck to paycheck and eats instant ramen because he does not get paid until the end of the month, and only eats frozen meals the rest of the time.

=== Hiwatari ===
Hiwatari (日渡) is Fuuka's classmate and friend. Her given name is unknown. First appearing in chapter 45, she visits Fuuka's home and recognizes Yotsuba from her trip to their high school in chapter 40. Hiwatari is a bit eccentric. Her nickname Miss Stake (しまうー, Shimaū) comes from a "mistake" she made when she first introduced herself to her class (in Japanese, shimau used as an auxiliary verb can mean to do something by accident, hence the pun).

=== Mii-Chan ===
Mii-Chan (みいちゃん) is a friend of Yotsuba's who is seen interacting with Fuuka and Yotsuba. She is seen in many background scenes and is about Yotsuba's age. She is first seen in Volume 3 on the swings with Yotsuba.

== Koiwai family ==
Because Yotsuba and her father Yousuke live apart from the other members of the Koiwai family, these characters are seen only occasionally.

=== Grandma ===
Yotsuba's grandmother, Yousuke Koiwai's mother, is originally from the Kansai region. She makes her first appearance in chapter 86, having taken a train from her home to visit Yotsuba and her dad. She has a serious look about her, but is a kindly woman whom Yotsuba looks up to. Although he is not shown, Yotsuba's grandfather is still alive.

=== Koharuko Koiwai ===
Koharuko Koiwai (小岩井 小春子, Koiwai Koharuko) is Yousuke's younger sister and Yotsuba's aunt, who lives in Tokyo. She is introduced in Chapter 96, although she is described as being clumsy earlier in Chapter 94: "someone who always whacks her hand or foot on the corner". She meets Koiwai and Yotsuba in Yoyogi Park to give them their new car, a Mini convertible.
