= Yotsuba =

Yotsuba may refer to:

- Yotsuba&!, a Japanese manga by Kiyohiko Azuma
- Yotsuba Koiwai, the title character from Yotsuba&!
- Yotsuba, a character from the manga and anime Sister Princess
- Yotsuba Nakano, a character from the manga and anime The Quintessential Quintuplets
- Yotsuba Group, the name of a group in the Japanese manga and anime Death Note
