= Nyanbo! =

Japanese anime series

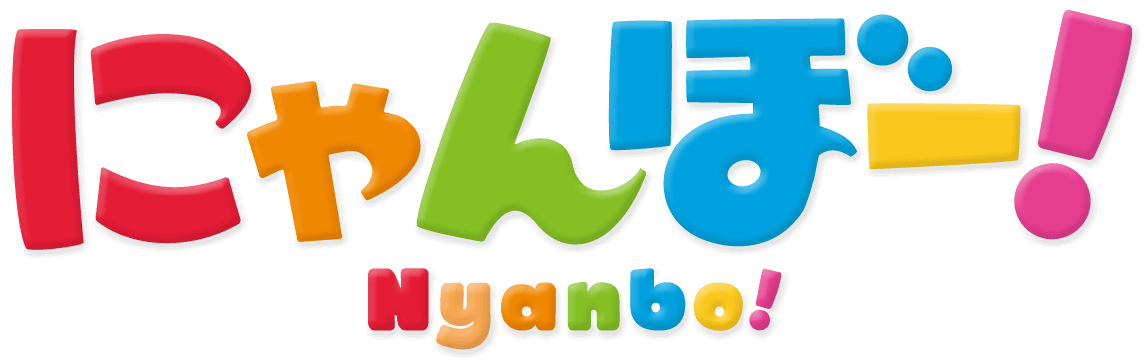

にゃんぼー！
- Anime television series
- Directed by: Akira Iwamoto
- Written by: Akira Iwamoto (Note: Screenplay); Sou Shotei (Note: Series composition)
- Studio: Shirogumi
- Licensed by: Crunchyroll (streaming); Discotek Media (home video)
- Original network: NHK-E
- Original run: September 27, 2016 – March 28, 2017
- Episodes: 26

Nyanbo! (にゃんぼー！) is a Japanese anime television series by Shirogumi. It is a spin-off of Kiyohiko Azuma's Yotsuba&! manga, based on the cat versions of the Danbo characters within the series and supervised by his studio office, Yotuba Sutazio. It began airing on September 27, 2016, on NHK-E.

== Figures ==
The original Nyanbo or Nyanboard 60mm figures were created by Sentinel in December 2015. The figure maker Kotobukiya released smaller 35mm versions called Nyanboard nyano in December 2016, and larger 90mm versions called Nyanboard [mini] in January 2017.

Nyanboard 90mm figures.

== Characters ==
=== Main characters ===
Tora (トラ)
Voiced by: Romi Park
A tiger-stripped Nyanbo and the leader of the group. He is the most eager to gather the UFO pieces and tries his best to motivate the others to help with it, with mixed results.
Kotora (コトラ)
Voiced by: Rie Kugimiya
Another tiger-stripped Nyanbo and Tora's younger sister, she is the only child in the group.
Shiro (シロ)
Voiced by: Yui Horie
A white-colored Nyanbo who is infatuated with Tora, and is always trying to win his affection.
Kuro (クロ)
Voiced by: Yuko Sanpei
A black-colored Nyanbo who rarely speaks, but is kind and dependable. He is usually seen playing with Kotora.
Mike (ミケ)
Voiced by: Junko Takeuchi
A calico cat-colored, carefree Nyanbo who usually gets himself and the other Nyanbos in trouble.

=== Nyanbo Angels ===
Sabatora (サバトラ)
Voiced by: Ayaka Suwa
A member of the idol band Nyanbo Angels. She is infatuated with Tora and often competes with Shiro to win him over.
Kijitora (キジトラ)
Voiced by: Sachika Misawa
A member of the idol band Nyanbo Angels. She has the habit of going berserk when she loses her glasses.

=== Wild Black ===
Blaze (ハチワレ, Hachiware)
Voiced by: Kazutoshi Hatano
The leader of Wild Black, a gang who loves the color black. He also is in love with Kuro, despite knowing the fact that Kuro is a boy. Kuro however, ignores his advances completely.
Magpie (シロクロ, Shirokuro)
Voiced by: Kiyohiro Yamaguchi
A member of Wild Black.
Socks (クツシク, Kutsushiku)
Voiced by: Yūji Kameyama
A member of Wild Black.

=== Mecha Nyanbos ===
Alpha (アルファ)
Voiced by: Kenichirou Matsuda
The leader of the Mecha Nyanbo who is seeking the UFO pieces to assemble Omega, his fighting robot, usually leading him to conflict with Tora and the others.
Zeta (ゼータ)
Voiced by: Kiyohiro Yamaguchi
One of the Mecha Nyanbo who helps Alpha with finding UFO pieces. He, unlike the rest of the Mecha Nyanbo, are friendly towards the Nyanbo.

=== Other characters ===
Narrator
Voiced by: Shinnosuke Mitsushima

== Media ==
=== Anime ===
The anime began airing on September 27, 2016, on NHK-E as part of its "mini-anime" program. The opening theme for the series is "Uchū Kara Yattekita Nyanbō" (宇宙からやってきたにゃんぼー) by Trio Ōhashi.

The series is simulcast on Crunchyroll outside of Asia, who are also the master licensee for the series. Discotek Media will release the series on home video.

==== Episode list ====
No.	Title	Original release date
1	"The Cats That Come From The Stars" "Hoshi Kara Kita Neko" (ほしからきたネコ)	September 27, 2016
The first episode introduces Tora and his friends, and their quest to find the lost UFO pieces.
2	"We Love Sparkly Things" "Kirakira ga Suki" (キラキラがすき)	October 4, 2016
As Kotora places a ball into a UFO piece, the UFO piece rejects it. While searching for pieces that could fit, the group meets the Nyanbo Angels.
3	"Mike the Hard Worker" "Ganbariya Mike" (がんばりやミケ)	October 11, 2016
Mike attempts to prove Tora that he is not as lazy as he seems.
4	"I Want to Be Cute!" "Kawaiku Naritai!" (かわいくなりたい！)	October 18, 2016
Shiro wants to look cuter to impress Tora, thus she looks for ways to look more pretty with Kotora, with mixed results.
5	"Tora and Kotora" "Tora to Kotora" (トラとコトラ)	October 25, 2016
A worried Kotora asks for Tora where their parents are. Unable to answer, he and the others look for ways to cheer her up.
6	"The Black Nyanbo" "Kuroi Nyanbō" (くろいにゃんぼー)	November 1, 2016
Tora and his friends meet the Nyanbos of Wild Black and trouble ensues when their leader gets infatuated with Kuro.
7	"Friends" "Tomodachidoushi" (ともだちどうし)	November 8, 2016
Tora and Blaze are finding colorful objects in order for it to react with a UFO piece. They later visit the group, where Tora and Blaze become friends at heart.
8	"The Nyanbo's Secret" "Nyanbō no Himitsu" (にゃんぼーのひみつ)	November 15, 2016
Mike realises that the Nyanbo behave like cats, and starts to see whether they act like cats.
9	"Is This a Rival?" "Moshikashite Raibaru" (もしかしてライバル)	November 22, 2016
Tora's group meet the Mecha Nyanbos, a group that is also collecting the UFO pieces for themselves.
10	"In Search of a Swirly" "Guruguru wo Sagashite" (ぐるぐるをさがして)	November 29, 2016
When Tora discovers that a crucial part of the UFO is still missing, Kotora tries to look for it, despite having a too vague description of it.
11	"The Greatest Friends" "Saikō no Nakama" (さいこうのなかま)	December 6, 2016
After losing another piece of the UFO to the Mecha Nyanbos, Tora discovers that his group have other interests in mind, and tries to rally them under his leadership again.
12	"The Battle Is Soccer?!" "Shōbu wa Sakkā!?" (しょうぶはサッカー！？)	December 13, 2016
The Wild Black and the Mecha Nyanbos decide to settle their disputes with a soccer match, and the Wild Black decide to look for help with their training,
13	"Let's Have a Party" "Pātī Shiyō ze" (パーティーしようぜ)	December 20, 2016
Christmas is at hand and the Nyanbos gather to celebrate, but each of them have a different concept in mind about how to do it.
14	"No Stress" "Nayami ga Nai" (なやみがない)	December 27, 2016
Tora points out how Mike lives a carefree life with no stress at all, and surprisingly, Mike decides to do something about it.
15	"The Microphone of Terror" "Kyōfu no Maiku" (きょうふのマイク)	January 10, 2017
The Nyanbos find a UFO piece that works as a microphone, triggering a karaoke competition between them.
16	"A Day in Kuro's Life" "Kuro no Ichinichi" (クロのいちにち)	January 17, 2017
Black and Shiro decide to follow Kuro in order to learn more about him, and what they discover astonishes them.
17	"Everyone's an Idol" "Minna de Aidoru" (みんなでアイドル)	January 24, 2017
Shiro and Kotora join the Nyanbo Angels and the four prepare themselves for their first live together.
18	"Mecha! Mecha! Mecha!" "Meka! Meka! Meka!" (メカ！メカ！メカ！)	January 31, 2017
Alpha visits the group, saying that he wants to play with them, but does so to steal Tora's UFO pieces.
19	"I Hate You, Nii-chan" "Nī-chan Kirai" (にいちゃんキライ)	February 7, 2017
As Kotora loses her teddy bear after playing with Mike, Tora scolds her, causing her to run away. Tora and the group later try to find Kotora.
20	"Stop, Time" "Jikan'yotomare" (じかんよとまれ)	February 14, 2017
Alpha and Tora find a UFO piece which can stop time. After the batteries die for the UFO piece, Alpha steals the piece for himself.
21	"I Want to Go to School" "Gakkō ni Ikitai" (がっこうにいきたい)	February 21, 2017
After finding out what school is, Kotora and the group decide to have a class before each Nyanbo gets kicked out.
22	"Evening Picnic" "Yoru no Pikunikku" (よるのピクニック)	February 28, 2017
As Tora invites the group for a picnic, he shows off the UFO, where he plans to leave the Earth by himself, before the group tell him that they should go together.
23	"This Is Big Omega!" "Kore ga Biggu Omega da!" (これがビッグオメガだ！)	March 7, 2017
After Alpha steals Tora's UFO pieces from his room to build Big Omega, Alpha chases Tora, Shiro and Mike in order to steal another UFO piece.
24	"The Zoo Incident" "Dō Butsu Enji Ken" (どうぶつえんじけん)	March 14, 2017
Tora and Mike find a UFO piece which give the Nyanbo different characteristics of animals.
25	"Tora Gets an Idea" "Hirameita Tora" (ひらめいたトラ)	March 21, 2017
Losing motivation after his UFO couldn't reach space, Kotora invites the Mecha Nyanbo to try help Tora.
26	"Cats Heading for the Stars" "Hoshi e Yuku Neko" (ほしへゆくネコ)	March 28, 2017
The group launch their UFO into outer space, and say their farewells to the others.

== Production ==
The series was announced in February 2016 by the NHK after as a "mini anime" corner program for NHK-E. The series is produced by Shirogumi. The anime series does not adapt any part of the original Yotsuba&! manga series, although its main character Yotsuba Koiwai has a speechless cameo on the credits in every episode.

== See also ==
- Danbo (character)
