= Danbo (character) =

- Yotsuba&! character
- Danbo with Yotsuba Koiwai
- First appearance: Chapter 28
- Created by: Kiyohiko Azuma

Danbo (ダンボー, Danbō; "cardboard") is a fictional cardboard box robot character from Kiyohiko Azuma's manga series Yotsuba&!. In the ADV Manga English translation of the manga the name Cardbo was used, but the name was restored to Danbo in the later released Yen Press English translation. In reality, Danbo is merely Miura Hayasaka, a friend of the protagonist Yotsuba's neighbor Ena, inside of a costume made of cardboard. Danbo was later picked up as an Internet meme, and inspired various electronic gadgets.

== Origin ==
Miura created the costume out of cardboard boxes as a school project in volume 5 of the series. 5-year-old protagonist Yotsuba is convinced it's a real robot. Danbo was also seen in volume 10, when Yotsuba visits Miura's apartment in an apartment complex (Yotsuba thinks it's a castle), Yotsuba finds the head of the costume.

== Appearances ==
=== Chapter 28: "Yotsuba & Cardbo" ===
Danbo first appeared in chapter 28 of the manga. It was created as a result of a challenge during summer vacation for elementary school students Ena and Miura. Although the person inside (Miura) is able to move upon wearing the costume, the young protagonist, Koiwai Yotsuba, found it by chance in the neighboring Ayase home while Miura was wearing the costume. Because Yotsuba believed it was a real robot, the two elementary school students joined forces to improvise a story in order to not destroy Yotsuba's dream. When Danbo claims to be going home, he leaves the Ayase home, with Miura still inside and Yotsuba still believing in him.

In the second semester, submitted to school as a summer project, Danbo receives a stamp from the teacher on the back of his head that reads "Very well done." After that, the Danbo costume is stored in Miura's room, left to decompose. In volume 10 Yotsuba unearths the head.

=== Chapter 69 ===
Yotsuba and Ena visit Miura, where she finds the Danbo costume and is shocked to see that Danbo doesn't move. Miura tells her this is because he died, but Ena intervenes and refutes this and pushes Yotsuba out of the room under the pretense that she and Miura need to perform a resurrection ritual. Thus Miura again needs to wear the costume and afterwards Yotsuba, Ena and Danbo go playing in the park.

== Merchandising ==
The Japanese company Kaiyodo has produced since late 2007 various Danbo action figures which became an Internet meme, and well-known over the Internet as a hero of many photo shoots, one of the most famous is "365 Days of Danbo" by Arielle Nadel.

Flickr returns over 36,000 photos tagged "Danboard". On images found on the Internet, Danbo is often depicted as being composed of Amazon packaging boxes.

As of 2012 Danbo is being used as a Mascot for the Thai PBS show "Little Citizen".

Danbo has also inspired a line of consumer electronics: The Japanese company Planex Communications has introduced a wireless LAN router and a USB hub. designed like Danbo's head, and Cheero has a line of Danbo batteries and USB cables. Most surprisingly, the Yotsuba Danbo head is also used as packaging for condoms made by the Japanese brand Okamoto.

== Internet meme ==
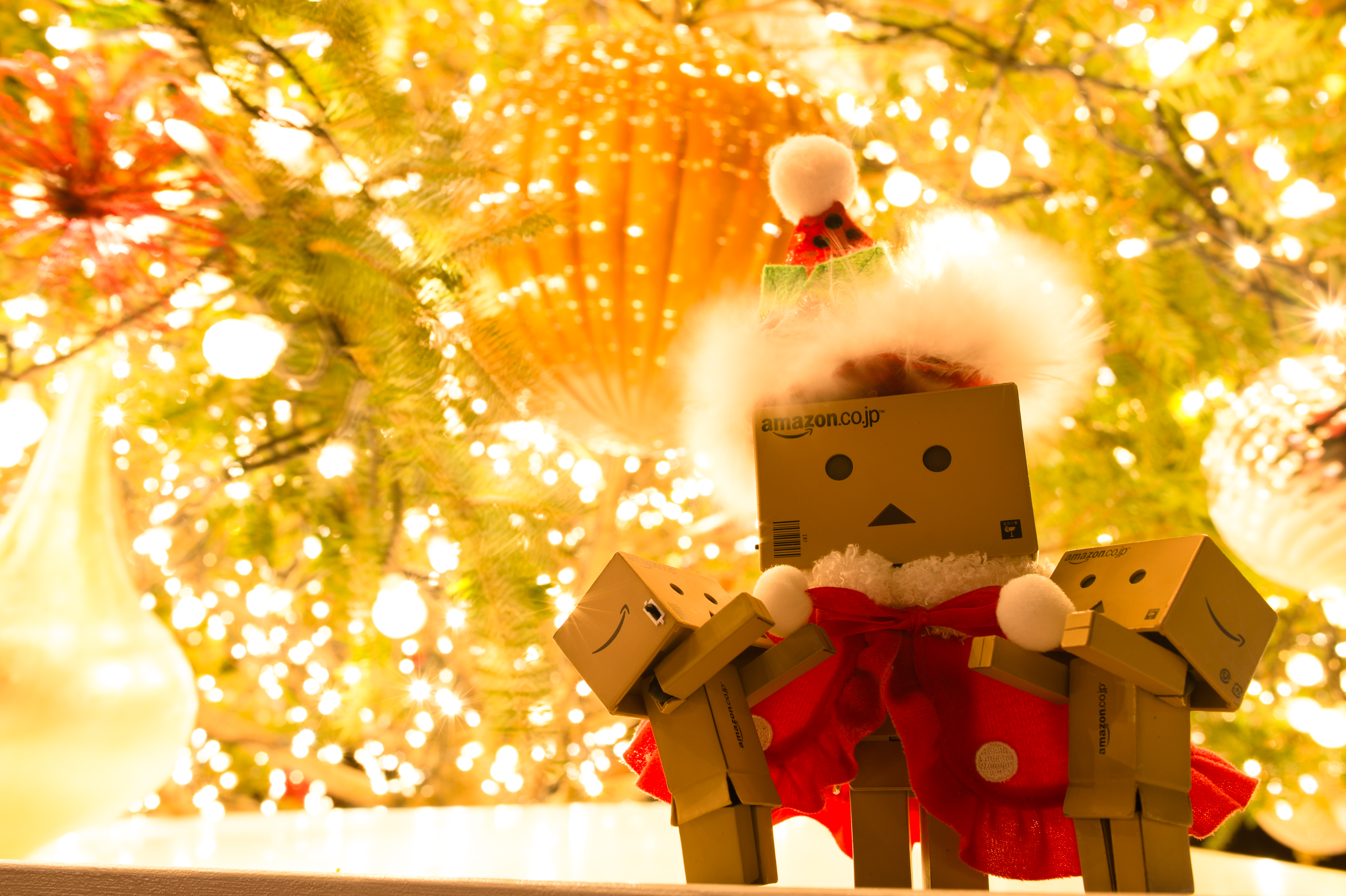
Danbo Santa Claus, Japan

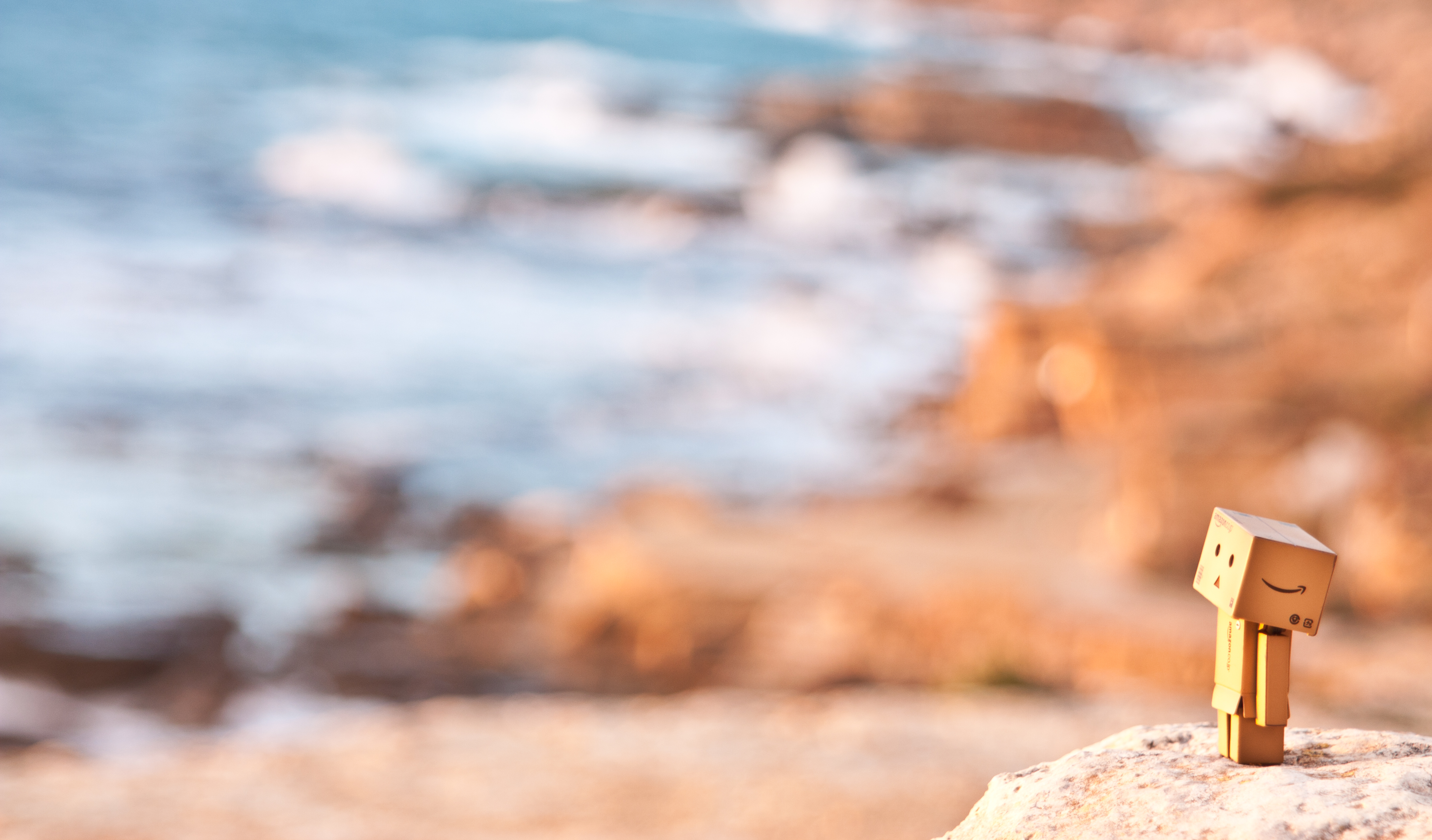
Danbo enjoying sunset at Majorca, Spain

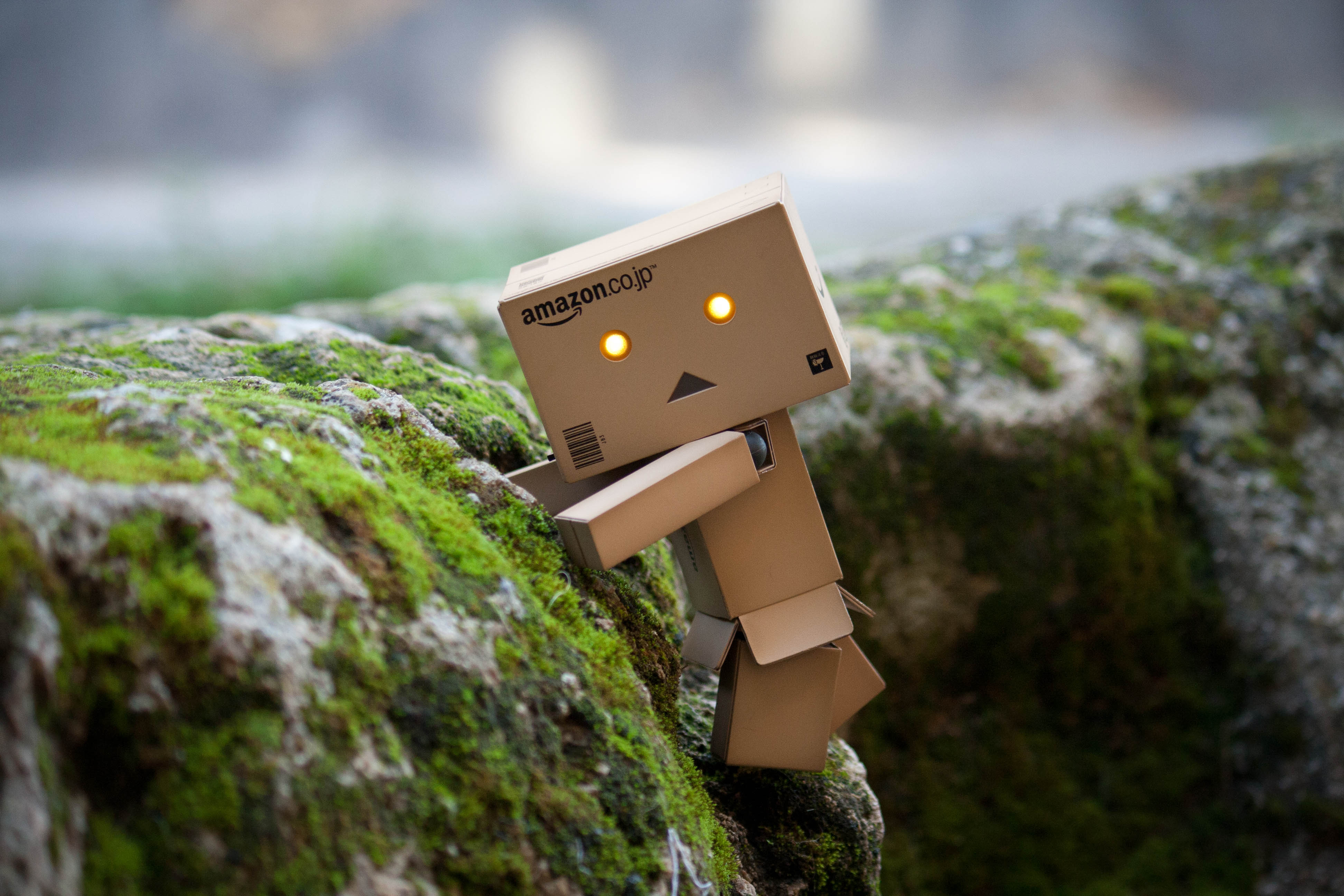
Danbo climbing

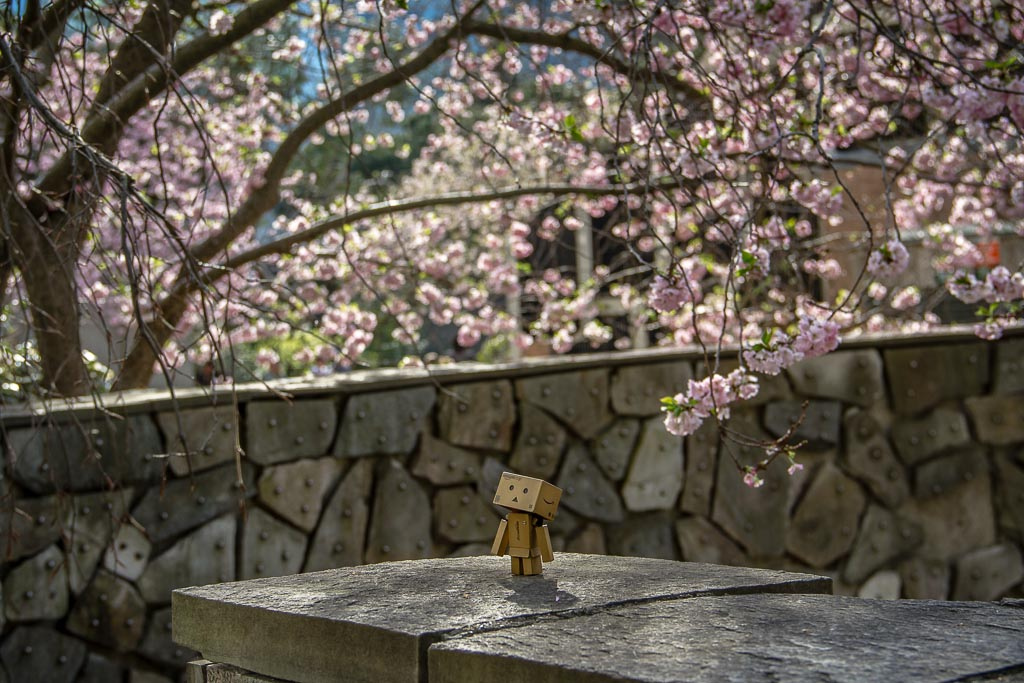
Danbo with Cherry blossoms in Paris

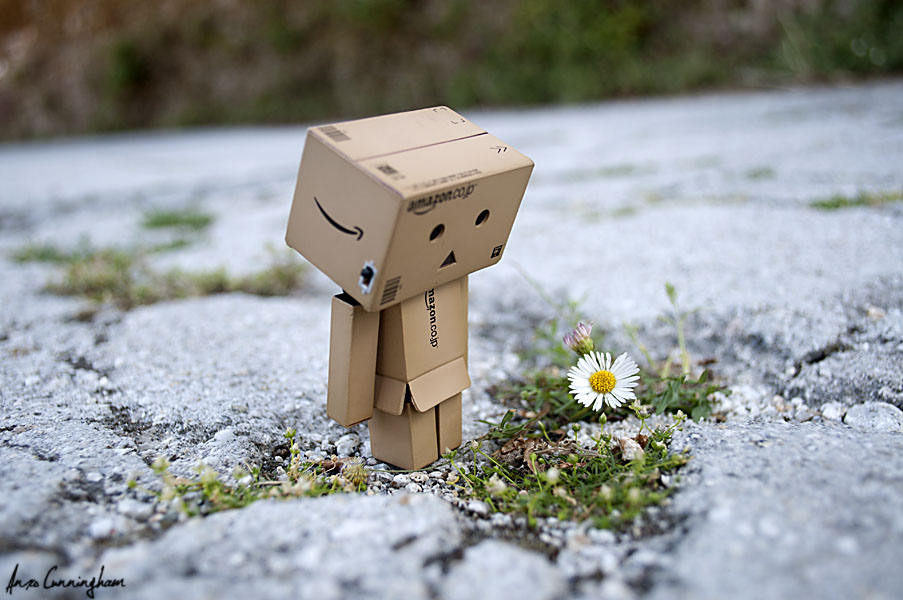
Danbo likes flowers.

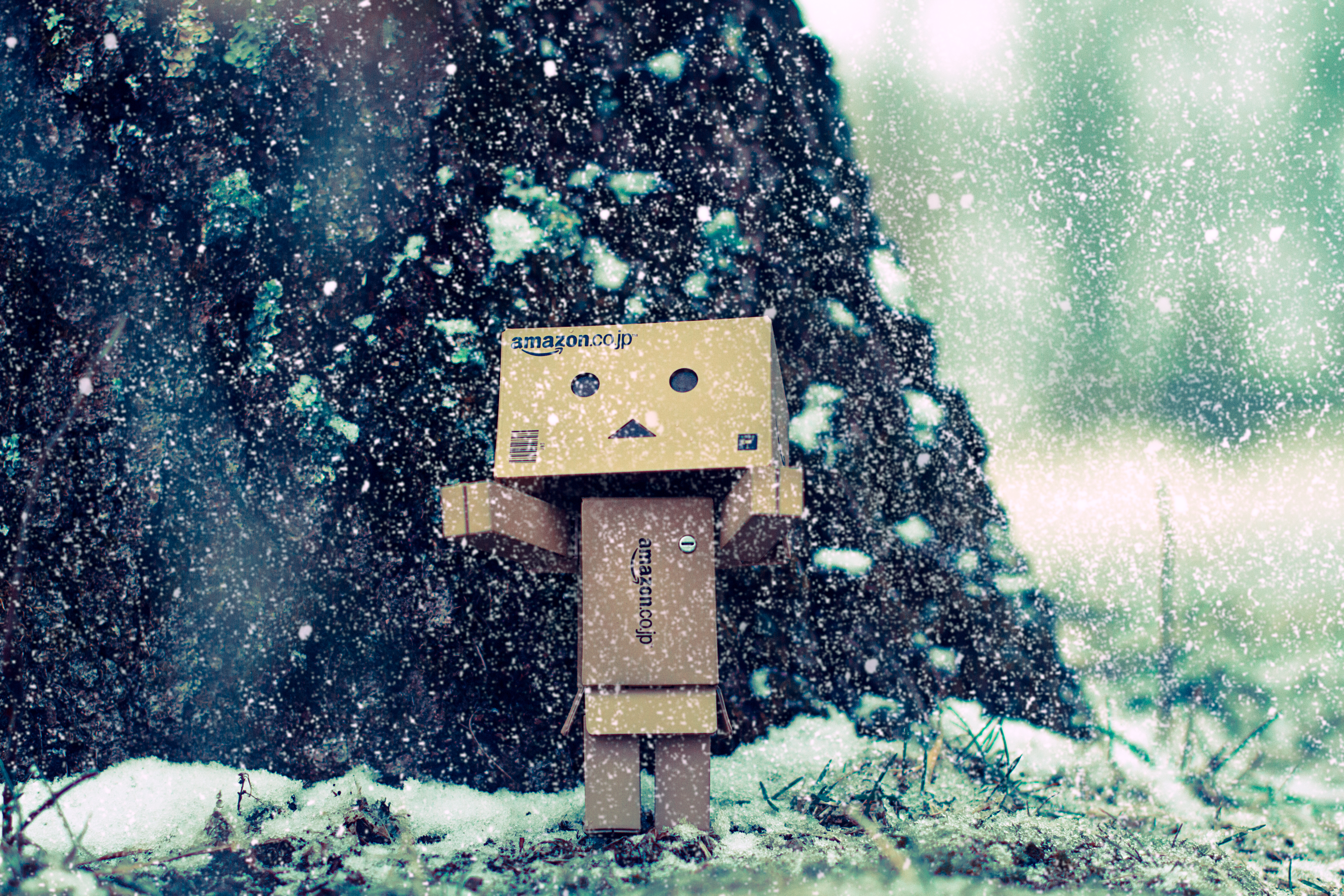
Danbo in the snow

== See also ==
- Nyanbo!, a spin-off of the original Danbo characters
