= Kazutoshi Hatano =

Japanese voice actor

Kazutoshi Hatano (波多野 和俊, Hatano Kazutoshi; born April 2, 1979) is a Japanese voice actor from Ōita, Japan.

== Voice roles ==
- Ai Yori Aoshi as Takashi
- Dōjin Work as Junichirō Hoshi
- Gift ~eternal rainbow~ as Masaki 'Maki' Edo
- Lamento: Beyond the Void as Konoe
- Mouse as SAT Agent (Ep 4)
- Nyanbo! as Blaze

=== Dubbing ===
- Takers, Eddie "Hatch" Hatcher (Jay Hernandez)
- Veteran, Detective Yoon (Kim Shi-hoo)
