= Yotsuba Koiwai =

- Yotsuba&! character
- Yotsuba, as drawn by Kiyohiko Azuma for a cover of the first manga tankōbon volume
- First appearance: Try! Try! Try! (1998)
- Created by: Kiyohiko Azuma

In-universe information
- Relatives: Yousuke Koiwai (adoptive father)

Yotsuba Koiwai (Japanese: 小岩井よつば, Hepburn: Koiwai Yotsuba), also known as just Yotsuba (よつば), is a fictional character and the main protagonist in the comedy manga series Yotsuba&!, as well as the one-shot manga "Try! Try! Try!", both by Kiyohiko Azuma. As the title character of both the series itself and almost every chapter, Yotsuba is usually the focus of each episode; most stories revolve around her meeting, and often childishly misunderstanding, a new concept or activity indicated in the chapter title. She is noted for her childish energy, unusual naïveté, and iconic appearance.

== Development ==
Yotsuba first appeared in a one-shot manga published in 1998 and two webcomics called "Try! Try! Try!", where she appears very similar as she does in Yotsuba&!; for example, Yotsuba has the same personality and a very similar chibi design.

== Appearance and personality ==
Yotsuba is drawn as a small girl with green hair done in four pigtails, giving her somewhat the appearance of her namesake, a four-leaf clover (Japanese: 四つ葉のクローバー, Hepburn: yotsuba no kurōbā). She has a carefree and energetic personality, taking delight in simple matters even as she learns about all manner of things in her daily life. From chapter 3 onwards, Yotsuba's dialogue in Japanese is written without kanji, making it seem simpler and more childlike, and in a simple, large, and bold typeface, which gives the impression that she is speaking with high intensity. Her energy is noted by other characters, especially members of the neighboring Ayase family. Her father says of her carefree nature, "She can find happiness in anything. Nothing in this world can get her down." However, when deeply frightened or upset, she does cry, and she has a fear of anything resembling a bullseye because it resembles an eye that "is staring at her".

At the start of the series, Yotsuba is shown as having very little knowledge of the world around her, even for a young child. Things such as swings, doorbells, cicadas, air conditioners, and recycling all fascinate and confuse her, although she is not perturbed by her ignorance. She occasionally mispronounces new words and creates neologisms, such as the name for her "Yotsubox" (よつばこ, Yotsubako) a portmanteau of "Yotsuba" and "box" (はこ, hako) that she uses to keep special things and her "scapbuk" (scrapbook). She often repeats, in incongruous ways, phrases spoken by adult characters around her without fully knowing the meaning, so she sometimes says vulgar words. A famous example of this is when Yotsuba learned the phrase "what the hell, man!" from her father's friend Takeshi Takeda, who Yotsuba calls Jumbo. Yotsuba is able to slowly sound out writing in hiragana, and is praised for this by Jumbo, but she cannot correctly read a clock. She is frequently shown drawing, though she is not as good an artist as she thinks she is, and she is an excellent swimmer.

The series provides few details about her life before its start. She is an adopted child, with her birthplace unknown to the reader, although she claims she's from an island "to the left." Koiwai, Yotsuba's adopted father, says he met her as an orphan in a foreign country and before he knew it he was raising her as his own; she is sometimes taken for a foreigner by strangers. When asked about her mother, she doesn't understand the question, and she gets confused by the concept of having two sets of grandparents. Before moving to her current home, Yotsuba lived in the country with Koiwai and his mother. She initially claims she is six years old, but her father later corrects this, saying she is in fact five years old.

Yotsuba has never attended school yet, as she is slightly too young for it, and as of the first chapter does not know what a grade is. In volume 6, chapter 35, she fails to understand repeated explanations of homework but in Volume 15, chapter 104, she begins preparations for starting school in the next year, such as buying her backpack.

== Reception ==
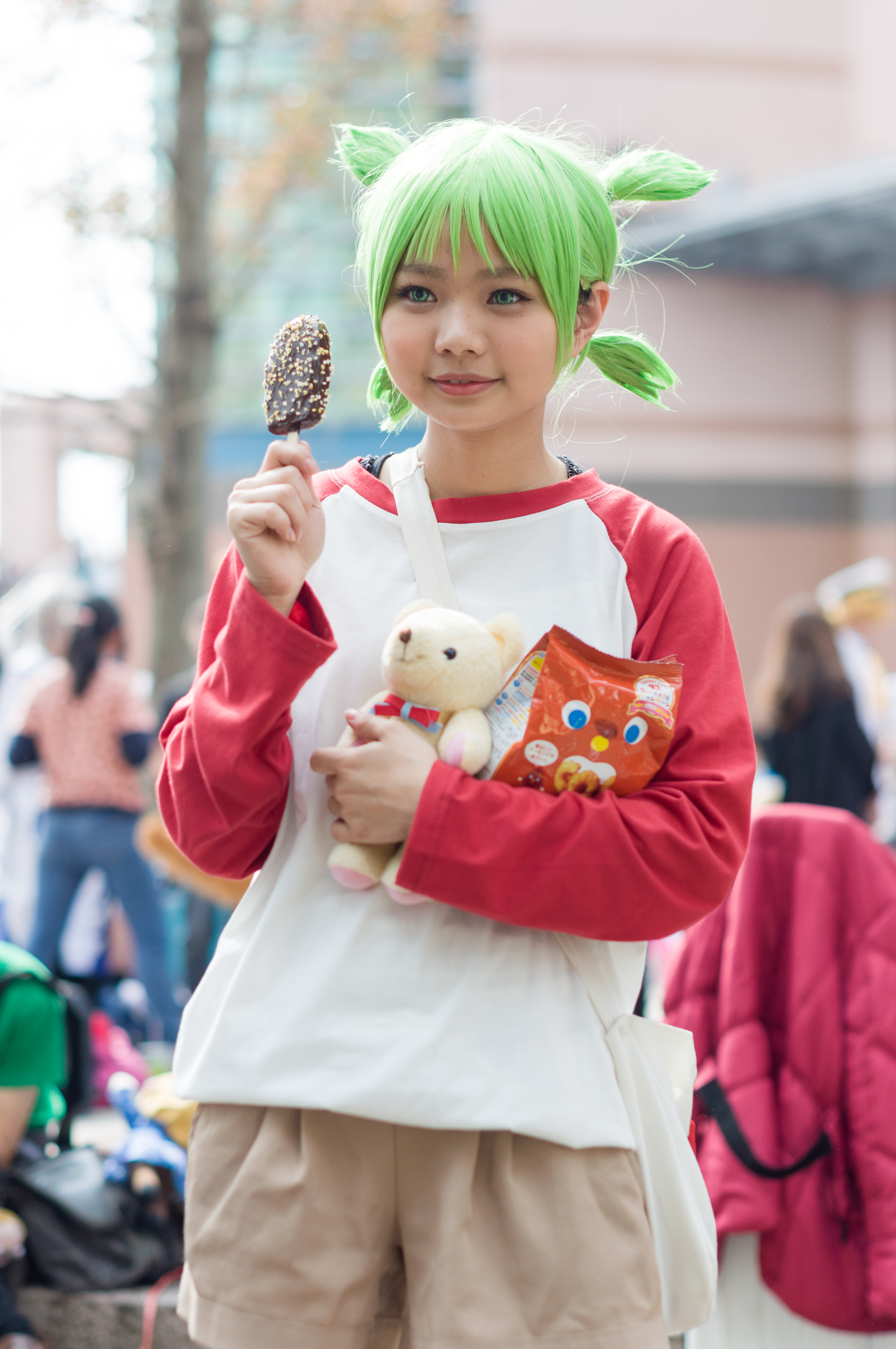
A Yotsuba cosplayer

The character of Yotsuba is cited by reviewers as one of the key appeals of Yotsuba&!, especially her energy, enthusiasm, and sense of wonder. For example, one wrote, "Yotsuba's wide-eyed awe at each discovery, from the idea of a milkman to learning how to catch fish, is both inspiring and infectious. You want to see what happens next, because she continually comes across as genuine without turning into cloying." A reviewer at Anime News Network wrote, "What is really special about Yotsuba, though, is that newness with which she, as a child, sees the world. That the manga allows us to glimpse the world through those same eager eyes is what gives it appeal far beyond its humor." Johanna Draper Carlson, long-time comics reviewer for Publishers Weekly, said that "Yotsuba is a sponge of a character, with infinite possibility as she learns about life. Watching her do so is both fun and funny, and the way she finds enjoyment in everything is inspirational. It creates an infectious feeling of shared joy in the reader." Another claimed that "Yotsuba Koiwai's adventures are ... a lucid and charming look at the world through a child's eyes, as she gets into scrapes that remind us all of our own childhoods (if only through manga-tinted glasses)."

Reviewers often describe Azuma's depiction of her as realistic, especially compared to depictions of children in other manga and anime. One review claimed that "Yotsuba in particular is amusing, because she acts and speaks with that peculiar mix of honesty, immediacy, and childish logic that only young children seem to possess ... Yotsuba isn't a silent, simpering sweetie-pie, she acts like a real five-year-old." On the other hand, Tom Spurgeon claimed Yotsuba is "an idealized kid of that early age, retaining a wide-eye wonder and furious energy, minus the things that crop up at that age like cruelty and deception" and a reviewer in Newtype USA said that "Her hijinks are sweetly innocent, like a cuter, more naïve version of Dennis the Menace minus the 'menace'."

== In other media ==
- Yotsuba has been described as an "unofficial mascot" of the popular English-language imageboard 4chan by Wired writer Justin Ling. The site logo and favicon consist of four leaves positioned akin to her distinctive four green pigtails, and she appears in the HTTP 404 message (leading to the nickname of "404 Girl"), along with banned user messages and banner ads. The software the site runs on is code-named Yotsuba, and it is also the name for the default theme.
- In the Korean MMORPG MapleStory, Yotsuba's hairstyle can be obtained in a salon located in a town called Zipangu (an archaic name for Japan).
- She appears in the ending of the spin-off anime series Nyanbo!, based on the Danbo character that appears in multiple chapters of the Yotsuba&! manga.
- In the anime series Eromanga Sensei, she is seen within the background alongside a Danbo.
- Volumes of Yotsuba&! (or manga distinctively resembling its volume/book design, as a parody) frequently appear in other anime series and manga, one example being Onimai: I'm Now Your Sister!.
