= Azumanga Daioh soundtracks =

Azumanga Daioh soundtracks include two original soundtracks to the Azumanga Daioh anime-adaptation, tribute albums and a collection of character image songs. Several soundtrack albums for the anime of Azumanga Daioh were released by Lantis, including two volumes of the Azumanga Daioh Original Soundtrack, collecting the show's score and themes; two tribute albums; and Vocal Collection, collecting character image songs. One single was released for the opening and closing theme of the anime, and eight singles of image songs were released for the main cast members. Most of the releases charted on the Japanese Oricon charts, with the highest ranking album being Tribute to Azumanga Daioh at 68th, and the highest ranking single being Soramimi no Cake/Raspberry Heaven, the opening and closing themes, at 36th.

== Azumanga Daioh Original Soundtrack, Volume 1 ==
Azumanga Daioh Original Soundtrack, Volume 1

Soundtrack album by Kuricorder Pops Orchestra, Oranges & Lemons & Masaki Kurihara
- Released: 2005-03-08
- Label: Geneon (U.S.) Lantis (Japan)

Azumanga Daioh Original Soundtrack, Volume 1 (あずまんが大王: オリジナルサウンドトラック, Volume 1) is the first volume of the soundtrack to the Azumanga Daioh anime television series. It was performed by the Kuricorder Pops Orchestra with Oranges & Lemons providing vocals for the intro and ending themes. It was released in the U.S. by Geneon on 2005-03-08.

=== Track listing ===
1. "Let's Begin"
2. Soramimi Cake [Cake of Mishearing] (TV Size)
3. "Of All Circumstances!"
4. "New School Term ①"
5. "You Mean, During the Break? ①"
6. "Let's Go Slowly"
7. "...Well"
8. "Bonkura-zu"
9. "Somehow"
10. "What Do You Mean?"
11. "I Think You're Wrong..."
12. "It's a Tightrope"
13. "New School Term ②"
14. "Miss Yukari Goes Wild! ~ First Half ~"
15. "Miss Yukari Goes Wild! ~ Second Half ~"
16. "Melancholy of Chiyo-chan"
17. "See You Tomorrow"
18. "It's a Stroll"
19. "New School Term ③"
20. "Chiyo-chan Runs!"
21. "Is It a Break? ②"
22. "It's a Holiday Tomorrow!"
23. "So Suspicious..."
24. "New School Term ④"
25. "I Wonder Why"
26. "Big Trouble!?"
27. "Good Scenery"
28. "What Are You Talking About?"
29. "Good Night"
30. "New School Term ⑤"
31. "...Damn, It's Too Late"
32. "It's All Right"
33. "...huh?"
34. "New School Term ⑥"
35. "Hang On~"
36. "Starry Night"
37. "Like This Sky"
38. "Raspberry Heaven (TV Size)"

== Azumanga Daioh Original Soundtrack, Volume 2 ==
Azumanga Daioh Original Soundtrack, Volume 2

Soundtrack album
- Released: 4 November 2002

Azumanga Daioh Original Soundtrack, Volume 2 (あずまんが大王: オリジナルサウンドトラック, Volume 2) is the second soundtrack to the Azumanga Daioh anime television series. It was released in Japan on 2002-11-04.

=== Track listing ===
1. "The Six are Always Together"
2. "It's Nice"
3. "Is She Pleased...?"
4. "Let's Do It in Moderation, OK?"
5. "Watch Out"
6. "Beautiful Sunset"
7. "'A'ye Catch (1)"
8. "Is it Shi-Sa?"
9. "Stroll in the Sea"
10. "School Trip?"
11. "To the Island of Dream"
12. "Iriomote Cat!!"
13. "Iriomote Cat!?"
14. "'A'ye Catch (2)"
15. "The Season I Spent With Maya"
16. "Together With Maya"
17. "Osaka Talks to Her Heart's Content"
18. "Three Years That Feel So Short"
19. "Bloom, Cherry Blossoms"
20. "God Bless the Little Girl"
21. "We Will All Stay Together Forever"
22. "Opening"
23. "The Bonkura-S Explode"
24. "Chiyo-Chan Is a High School Student at the Age of Ten"
25. "Osaka's Wild Imagination in Class"
26. "Suspense in Search of Locks of Hair"
27. "Chiyo-ish Fantasy"
28. "Another Chiyo"
29. "At the End of the Day"
30. "It's All Right"
31. "Don't Worry"
32. "Don't Be Discouraged, Chiyo-chan"
33. "Seems Happy?"
34. "Chiyo-chan's "Let's Make It!"
