= List of Azumanga Daioh characters =

The main characters. From left to right: Sakaki, Kagura, Chiyo, Tomo, Yomi, and Osaka

This is a list of characters from the manga series Azumanga Daioh by Kiyohiko Azuma, later adapted to anime.

Azumanga Daioh chronicles the everyday life in an unnamed Japanese high school of six girls and two of their teachers: child prodigy Chiyo Mihama and her struggle to fit in with girls five years older; reserved Sakaki and her obsession with cute animals while certain ones seem to hate her; spacey Ayumu "Osaka" Kasuga with a skewed perspective on the world; Koyomi "Yomi" Mizuhara's aggravation at an annoying best friend; Tomo Takino, whose energy is rivaled only by her lack of sense; sporty Kagura and her one-sided athletics rivalry with Sakaki; their homeroom teacher Yukari Tanizaki; and her friend, physical education teacher Minamo "Nyamo" Kurosawa. Secondary characters include Kimura, a creepy male teacher with an obsession with teenage girls, and Kaorin, a female classmate with a crush on Sakaki.

Four of the girls were included in Newtype's top 100 anime heroines of 2002: Osaka was awarded 7th, Chiyo 11th, Sakaki 21st, and Yomi 78th. Together they made Azumanga Daioh the 2nd most popular series of 2002 for female characters.

== Major characters ==
=== Students ===
The students have a variety of different personalities.

==== Chiyo Mihama ====
Chiyo Mihama
- Azumanga Daioh character
- First appearance: Azumanga Daioh: The Manga (1999)
- Last appearance: Azumanga Daioh: The Animation (2002)
- Voiced by: Tomoko Kaneda (Japanese); Jessica Boone (English)

In-universe information
- Alias: Chiyo-chan
- Nationality: Japanese

Chiyo Mihama (美浜 ちよ, Mihama Chiyo), usually called Chiyo-chan, is a child prodigy, having skipped five grades to 10th grade (the first year of high school in Japan) at the start of the series, yet she is still at the top of the class. Such grade skipping would be unthinkable in Japan, and the series humorously explores its potential consequences. The other characters find Chiyo amazingly cute, but sometimes take advantage of both her youthfulness and her scholastic abilities. However, it seems her classmates are mostly nice to her, with the exception of Tomo, who seems to enjoy teasing her. Her diminutive stature leads to her having a lack of confidence, particularly in sports where she fears she is a burden to others. Chiyo is frequently viewed with envy by fellow students, initially because of her intelligence, but later also because of the discovery that her family is exceedingly wealthy (they own an enormous mansion and a summer house, which Chiyo invites her classmates to visit on several occasions). The stylistic rendering of Chiyo's pigtails allow for several visual gags in both the manga and anime: Osaka often imagines them to be flapping wings, that they can be detached and replaced, they control her, or even that they are entities independent of Chiyo herself. At home, she can almost always be found in the company of her Great Pyrenees dog, Mr. Tadakichi. Because of her small size, she can even ride on his back as if he were a horse. Of all of the girls, she is the only one who does not sit through college entrance exams, as she intends to study overseas in America.

==== Ayumu "Osaka" Kasuga ====
Ayumu Kasuga
- Azumanga Daioh character
- First appearance: Azumanga Daioh: The Manga (1999)
- Last appearance: Yotsuba&! (2025)
- Voiced by: Yuki Matsuoka (Japanese); Kira Vincent-Davis (English)

In-universe information
- Alias: Osaka
- Nationality: Japanese

Ayumu Kasuga (春日 歩, Kasuga Ayumu), commonly known as Osaka (大阪, Ōsaka), is a transfer student from Osaka. Tomo and Yukari expected her to act like the stereotypical Osakan (loud, exuberant, and fond of bawdy jokes). She is in the Volume 2 DVD. Tomo was quick to choose her nickname, although Ayumu's behavior could not be more different from the "typical" Osakan. Ayumu considers her label "too simple" and "icky," but she lacks the energy or motivation to dispute it. Unlike the stereotypical Osakan, she seems slow and easily distracted, but she merely has a mind that works quite differently than most people. This makes her prone to daydreaming, absentmindedness, and non-sequiturs, but it also makes her unusually good at answering very specific types of riddles. She gets very bad grades at school as she sleeps through most of her classes, much to the irritation of her homeroom teacher, Yukari. She is very bad at sports: the worst in her class and possibly the whole school. She has almost no flexibility in her body; when stretching as a warm-up exercise, she cannot bend at all. She is easily amused by things that most people would consider bizarre. During the Sports Festival, she made a big deal out of running the obstacle course because she thought the event of sticking her face in flour to get a piece of candy was funny and had a giggle fit when she got there. Additionally, when participating in a bread-eating race, her concentration was trounced when the commentator listed the flavour of breads available, causing her to spend too much time deliberating which flavour to pick and, hence, coming in last. The manga revealed that she likes to run outside and play in typhoons. Her unusual way of thinking gives her a very vivid imagination and a unique way of seeing the world. In the English adaptation of the anime, she is given a distinct Houston accent.

Osaka later appears in the sixteenth volume of Yotsuba&!, making her the first Azumanga Daioh character to make an appearance in the series. Osaka is revealed in this volume to be working as a teacher.

==== Tomo Takino ====
Tomo Takino
- Azumanga Daioh character
- First appearance: Azumanga Daioh: The Manga (1999)
- Last appearance: Azumanga Daioh: The Animation (2002)
- Voiced by: Chieko Higuchi (Japanese); Mandy Clark (English)

In-universe information
- Nationality: Japanese

Tomo Takino (滝野 智, Takino Tomo) is extremely energetic and competitive, despite being nonathletic and a slacker at the same time. She randomly challenges people to competitions she can't win - mostly Sakaki in sports and Chiyo in scholastics. She tends to irritate everyone around her, but especially Yomi, who has been her classmate since elementary school. Tomo's character is extremely impulsive and she never considers nor cares about the consequences of anything she says or does. She is the only one of the main cast who picks on Chiyo. During the second trip to Chiyo's summer house, Tomo actually grabbed Chiyo's house keys and threw them into the forest because she wanted to see what would happen if they had lost them; which, of course, was a very bad idea. However, on the occasions when Tomo has actually been inspired to concentrate on something, she has demonstrated that she is quite capable. She succeeded in gaining the grades needed to qualify for the same high school as Yomi, though it was only after Yomi ridiculed her and openly said that there was no way that she could do so. Once Tomo began attending high school however, she returned to her lackadaisical ways.

==== Koyomi "Yomi" Mizuhara ====
Koyomi Mizuhara
- Azumanga Daioh character
- First appearance: Azumanga Daioh: The Manga (1999)
- Last appearance: Azumanga Daioh: The Animation (2002)
- Voiced by: Rie Tanaka (Japanese); Nancy Novotny (English)

In-universe information
- Alias: Yomi
- Nationality: Japanese

Koyomi Mizuhara (水原 暦, Mizuhara Koyomi), commonly known as Yomi, is a grade-school friend and general antithesis of Tomo. She is the voice of reason of the series, carrying herself as the most mature and sometimes bitter member of the group. Though smart and athletic, she is constantly dissatisfied with herself due to her weight and is always trying various diets in an effort to become thinner. She can never seem to stick to these diets however, as she finds herself constantly tempted by her favorite foods. Another weakness of Yomi's character is that while she is above average in everything else, she is an awful singer, yet karaoke is one of her favorite pastimes. While usually functioning as Tomo's "straight man", she sometimes manifests a rather cruel sense of humor, such as tricking the cat-tongued Osaka into eating an extremely spicy croquette. Compared to most of her peers, Yomi uses more masculine Japanese speech patterns, especially when dealing with Tomo's antics. Yomi also has an uppercut that Tomo is usually on the receiving end of whenever she pushes Yomi too far. However, even though she likes to think that she is well above the immature behavior of some of her classmates, Yomi has demonstrated on certain occasions that she can be just as childish as the rest of the characters, such as trying to get Chiyo to infuse a shrine charm with some of her intelligence so that she could pass her college entrance exams.

==== Sakaki ====
Sakaki
- Azumanga Daioh character
- First appearance: Azumanga Daioh: The Manga (1999)
- Last appearance: Azumanga Daioh: The Animation (2002)
- Voiced by: Yū Asakawa (Japanese); Christine Auten (English)

In-universe information
- Nationality: Japanese

Sakaki (榊, Sakaki) is a tall, soft-spoken girl uncomfortable with her height and busty physique. Because she is so shy, she seldom speaks, and her reticence is misinterpreted as being mysterious, or cool. This reputation has been compounded by the fact that most of the school's sports teams try to recruit her every year in the story because of her natural athletic ability (she's usually stronger and faster than most of the male students in school), but, for the most part, she has no real interest in sports. Most students think that because of her demeanor, that she dislikes anything and everything adorable and cute. In contrast to what the other students think of her, Sakaki is in reality a very emotionally sensitive person who holds a secret longing for all things cute. She loves animals, but the neighborhood cats dislike her, and her parents do not allow cats in their house because of her mother's allergies. Sakaki ends up spending a lot of time with Chiyo upon finding out that Chiyo's dog, Mr. Tadakichi, will let her pet him. This friendship actually shows the irony of their circumstances, as Sakaki wishes she looked more like Chiyo, so she could openly pursue her interest in cute things, and Chiyo wishes that she looked more like Sakaki so people would take her more seriously. Later in the series, Sakaki also befriends an Iriomote kitten that she meets on a side trip to Iriomote Island during a class trip to Okinawa. Later, the kitten loses its mother and proceeds to seek out Sakaki in Tokyo. Since Sakaki was in danger with the neighborhood's cat leader and the cat's kitty band, the kitten saves her and they soon become close friends. Kagura, at one point, drew over Sakaki's cat drawings, much to Sakaki's dismay. Sakaki is bad at art (shown by small pictures of cats in her note book) and loves Neco Coneco.

==== Kagura ====
Kagura
- Azumanga Daioh character
- First appearance: Azumanga Daioh: The Manga (1999)
- Last appearance: Azumanga Daioh: The Animation (2002)
- Voiced by: Houko Kuwashima (Japanese); Allison Sumrall (English)

In-universe information
- Nationality: Japanese

Kagura (神楽) is a later acquaintance, joining Yukari's class in the 2nd year (Yukari selects her as a ringer to win the school athletic competitions). She was originally in Nyamo's class and displays a very competitive spirit with her peers in all things (though she has little success in academics). She devotes most of her time to the swim team (which is why she has a tan most of the time) but is an all-around good athlete, and genuinely nice to her classmates. She has a slight obsession with Sakaki, whom she sees as an athletic rival. This is mostly due to the fact that while Kagura trains constantly to stay in shape, Sakaki is a naturally gifted athlete with no training at all. Like Tomo, Kagura tends to be quite impulsive in her actions (although unlike Tomo, Kagura is consciously aware of this and makes a genuine effort to keep it under control). With the arrival of Kagura, a trio of underachievers — together with Tomo and Osaka — is formed called the "Bonkuras" (which roughly translates to "Team Idiot" or "Blockheads"). Kagura has a sensitive side, which the audience sees in episode six of the anime following her homeroom's defeat in the sports festival, and the final episode following graduation. Kagura and Yukari enjoy playing video games. Like Sakaki, she is quite busty (and Tomo teases both of them about their large breasts), but more tomboyish (in contrast to Sakaki's more elegant nature). She has also made it perfectly clear that she will not tolerate the antics of Mr. Kimura.

==== Kaori ====
Kaori
- Azumanga Daioh character
- First appearance: Azumanga Daioh: The Manga (1999)
- Last appearance: Azumanga Daioh: The Animation (2002)
- Voiced by: Sakura Nogawa (Japanese); Tiffany Grant (English)

In-universe information
- Alias: Kaorin
- Nationality: Japanese

Kaori (かおり), also known as Kaorin, is a girl infatuated with Sakaki, whose unrequited feelings are a frequent source of anxiety. Her friends seem mostly unaware of her crush on Sakaki, and it is unknown whether or not Sakaki can reciprocate her feelings if she knew about them. In the 2009 manga Azumanga Daioh: Supplementary Lessons, Osaka asks Kaori if she is homosexual. Kaori becomes embarrassed and protests that it's "one of those things peculiar to puberty". Kaori then attempts to prove Osaka wrong by saying she would feel the same way even if Sakaki were a man, which confounds Osaka.

While her given name is Kaori, she is almost always addressed by her nickname of Kaorin (かおりん) (nicknames are often formed by changing the end of a name in this way to sound cute). Kaorin's surname is speculated to be Aida, judging from a panel in volume one of the manga, however this is still unconfirmed.

Kaorin is normally shy and sensitive to a fault, but frequently has been known to display a ferocious temper and is prone to extreme jealousy when Sakaki is involved. She can also be more than a little neurotic. She has some artistic talent, and helped design Chiyo's penguin suit.

For her first two years, she is a member of the Astronomy Club and goes to their camps during the summer break. After the main group's first visit to Chiyo-chan's summer home, she is horrified to learn that Sakaki went after seeing some rather glamorous pictures of her would-be love interest, particularly one with Tomo inadvertently sleeping with her arms around Sakaki. In her senior year, she accompanies the group to Chiyo's summer home (and is, like Chiyo, left emotionally scarred by her ride in the Yukari-mobile). Also during that year, Kimura-sensei transferred her into his class, much to Kaorin's dismay (Kaorin dreads Kimura-sensei's attention even more emphatically than her peers do). Kimura-sensei expresses more interest in her than in any other student, to the point of planting a Kimura and Kaorin garden. He also tells her to call him by a nickname when she complains that she is the only student in class being addressed by a nickname. Kaorin attempts to overlook Kimura-sensei's faults after meeting his sensitive and sweet wife, however this ends quickly. On their final day of class, to Kaorin's horror, Kimura-sensei tells the class that he and Kaorin will be together forever. She also gets to take a photo with her beloved Miss Sakaki in that episode, which she demands Tomo to send her as soon as possible.

Appearing only sparsely in the original manga, Kaorin's role was significantly increased for the anime, to the extent that she even appears with the rest of the group in the opening and closing credits. In the anime, she is notably closer to the other girls, going to Chiyo's house and preparing for the first Culture Festival with them, and accompanying them on their trip to a shrine on New Year's Day, after having an anime-exclusive New Year's dream of her own. Her involvement in existing stories and sketches from the manga is often increased for the anime, and she has several anime-exclusive skits dedicated to her, almost universally involving her pining over Sakaki or being pursued by Mr. Kimura. She is the only character to have one of their parents actually shown on-screen (not counting 'Chiyo Father'). Her mother, who bears a striking resemblance to her, appears in episode 8, waking Kaorin up from her New Year's Dream.

Erica Friedman would later describe Kaorin as a "side character with an unrequited and unstated crush on a character of the same sex."

=== Teachers ===
==== Yukari Tanizaki ====
Yukari Tanizaki
- Azumanga Daioh character
- First appearance: Azumanga Daioh: The Manga (1999)
- Last appearance: Azumanga Daioh: The Animation (2002)
- Voiced by: Akiko Hiramatsu (Japanese); Luci Christian (English)

In-universe information
- Occupation: Language teacher
- Nationality: Japanese

Yukari Tanizaki (谷崎 ゆかり, Tanizaki Yukari), also known as Yukari-sensei, is the girls' English (Spanish in US version / French in UK version) and homeroom teacher (class 3), but a teacher with very unconventional methods and a rather close relationship with the class. Her students are casual enough to call her by her first name: Yukari-sensei, and some of them use the informal title Yukari-chan. Depending on her mood, she can be either a horrible tyrant or sweet. Like Tomo, Yukari is impulsive (stealing a bike to avoid being late), in sharp contrast to fellow teacher Nyamo's more reserved nature. Yukari is also a notoriously bad driver, as evidenced by the battered, horrid condition of her car, a silver Toyota Corolla, which the students have dubbed "The Yukari-mobile" (It belongs to her parents, and Yukari borrows it). Apparently, on the first trip to Chiyo's summer house, Yukari's driving was so bad that poor Chiyo was psychologically scarred and she has gone to enormous lengths to avoid riding with Yukari since. The only student who seems to actually enjoy the way Yukari drives is Tomo. Oddly enough, in the manga the Yukarimobile is an eighth generation Toyota Corolla, whereas in the anime it is a ninth generation Toyota Corolla, which didn't even exist during the girls' first year.

==== Minamo "Nyamo" Kurosawa ====
Minamo Kurosawa
- Azumanga Daioh character
- First appearance: Azumanga Daioh: The Manga (1999)
- Last appearance: Azumanga Daioh: The Animation (2002)
- Voiced by: Aya Hisakawa (Japanese); Monica Rial (English)

In-universe information
- Alias: Nyamo
- Occupation: Gym teacher
- Nationality: Japanese

Minamo Kurosawa (黒沢 みなも, Kurosawa Minamo), also known as Kurosawa-sensei or "Nyamo" (にゃも) or "Nyamo-sensei," is a gym teacher at the girls' school. In the girls' first year of high school, she is the homeroom teacher of class 5. During their last two years, she is the homeroom teacher of class 2. She is an old high school friend and rival of Yukari. Popular with the students, Nyamo is a nice person, and unlike Yukari she is generally in control. This fact causes so much resentment in Yukari that she will go to almost any length to appear the superior teacher (including signing up Kagura for her class so Minamo would not have anyone who could challenge Sakaki in the Sports Festival). Although they do have their fights, Minamo does try her best to take the high road and not let Yukari's antics get to her. She also tries to help Yukari out from time to time and attempts to inspire her to become a better teacher (although most of her efforts are met with failure). However, Minamo has proven that she can be just as vulnerable to losing control as Yukari is. During one of their trips to Chiyo's summer house, while attempting to prevent Yukari from getting drunk and embarrassing herself in front of her students, she ends up drinking an entire bottle of sake and an unknown quantity of beer. But her plan only results in getting drunk herself and she ends up spending half the night telling the girls some unknown but clearly very risque things (shown in a montage of wholesome images with music instead of dialogue). Fortunately, Chiyo is too young to understand what she is talking about. The next morning she asks for clarification, much to Nyamo's horror while the others girls start treating her in a very formal and respectful way.

She drives a blue Toyota Vitz.

==== Kimura ====
Kimura
- Azumanga Daioh character
- First appearance: Azumanga Daioh: The Manga (1999)
- Last appearance: Azumanga Daioh: The Animation (2002)
- Voiced by: Kōji Ishii (Japanese); Andy McAvin (English)

In-universe information
- Alias: Mr. Kimura
- Occupation: Classical literature teacher
- Family: Wife and daughter
- Nationality: Japanese

Kimura (木村先生, Kimura-sensei), also known as Mr. Kimura, is the only regular male character in the series. Kimura is a "creepy" and ephebophiliac Classical Japanese teacher, who openly admits he became a teacher to be close to high-school girls. He is constantly lewd and openly seeks excuses to "observe" girls, such as during swimming class or when they are measured and weighed by the school nurse. He especially likes Kaorin, much to her dismay. He addresses her by her nickname "Kaorin", and she feels that he takes his affections to an inappropriate level for a student-teacher acquaintance. When she voices her objections to being called "Kaorin" by him, he then asks her to address him by the similarly cutesy name "Kimurin" ("Mr. Kim-Kims" in ADV Manga's English translation), which he views as a trade off for calling her Kaorin. Unsurprisingly, Kaorin rejects this offer.

Kimura habitually appears with his mouth gaping open, and his eyes cannot be seen behind his glasses. This combined with his repulsively gaunt physique gives him a vaguely zombie-like appearance. At his first appearance in the manga, Kimura seems normal, but takes on his usual expression after he was asked why he became a teacher—as if he had some sort of mental break. In the anime, he is always open-mouthed. Most female students (and some faculty) intensely loathe him, but some male students admire his "sincerity". Despite his lewd activities, outside of school Kimura appears as a responsible and kind-hearted person: he recycles littered cans, donates frequently to charities, and even offered ¥10,000 to a shrine as he prayed for world peace. He has a beautiful wife and daughter, who love him despite his strange obsession; his wife even claims to find him very handsome and thinks "he's cool!"

When Tomo finds a picture of his wife and asks who she is, he replies, in heavily accented English, "Mai waifu" ("Mein wife" in ADV Manga's English translation). "Mai waifu", sometimes shortened to just waifu, has since become a common phrase among anime fans referring to any fictional character that a fan considers their significant other, from manga and anime to video games. It is also how a Japanese native speaker would pronounce the English word for "wife". Also "husbando".

In Manga: The Complete Guide, Jason Thompson cautions that the jokes that revolve around the "vaguely pedophilic teacher" might disturb some newer readers of manga, and later suggested that he might be a parody of the readers of the magazine Azumanga Daioh ran in.

== Minor characters ==
=== Chihiro ===
Voiced by: Akane Omae (Japanese); Hilary Haag (English)
Chihiro (千尋) is a classmate and friend of Kaorin. Little is known except her name. When she appears, she is usually keeping Kaorin company, and she collaborates with her on some projects. Once, when Chiyo-chan tutored her, Yukari assumed it was the reverse. Occasionally Chihiro bears the brunt of Kaorin's temper, without knowing why; it is unclear how aware she is of Kaorin's crush on Sakaki. Chihiro was also one of the most disgusted by the cockroach that appeared in class in Episode 2. In the manga, during the senior year sports festival Chihiro dressed as Chihiro from Spirited Away, partnered with another student (possibly Kaorin) dressed as Kaonashi from the same film. Chihiro's surname is speculated to be Inoue, judging from a panel in volume one of the manga, however this is still unconfirmed.

=== Chiyo-Father ===
Voiced by: Norio Wakamoto (Japanese); Jason Douglas (English)
"Chiyo-Father" (「ちよ父」, "Chiyo-chichi") is a strange-looking and even stranger-acting cat-like creature which appears in Sakaki's dreams, claiming to be Chiyo's father. Chiyo-Father has also appeared in Osaka's dreams with the same claim, despite the fact that Sakaki has apparently never really explained these dreams to other people. Polite but prone to fits of unsettling anger (after Osaka compared him to Yoshirō Mori in the manga and anime sub, and Bill Clinton in the anime dub), he may be bullet-proof, have the ability to fly, be a great baseball player, and/or be Santa Claus. Osaka gives Chiyo a stuffed animal shaped like Chiyo-Father on her birthday (which might be the original Chiyo-Father and the source of Sakaki's and Osaka's dreams after they had seen it in the store). On the day the class opens a stuffed animal café for the Culture Fest, Sakaki makes her classmates hats in the shape of Chiyo-Father. When Yukari asks why they are called "Father Hats", Osaka replies "Sakaki started calling them that". Chiyo-Father is often seen floating around in random locations in Azumanga Daioh the Animation. In addition, Chiyo-Father can levitate from place to place, finds the color red discomforting, and is inconsistent about whether he really is a cat. Fuuka has a T-shirt with Chiyo-Father on it (which is greatly mocked by Miura), and the stuffed animal Chiyo-Father also appears in Fuuka's room and as merchandise in Azuma's current manga, Yotsuba&!.

=== Kimura's wife ===
Voiced by: Sayaka Ohara (Japanese); Kaytha Coker (English)
Kimura's wife is depicted, in Japanese terms, as a stereotypical beauty, having long wavy hair (other examples of this stereotype to be found in anime include Sailor Neptune and Nadeshiko Kinomoto). The incongruity of the unwholesome Kimura being married to such a beautiful (and evidently wholesome) woman is used as a humorous device, with her appearances invariably leading to bemusement and speculation amongst the other characters, who are uncertain whether they ought to conclude that she is a saint, or an idiot. Like Kimura, she also recycles frequently. She seems to have a kind and ditzy personality, such as when she chases a tin can until she hits her head on a lamp-post. She also refers to Kimura's lunch as the "Love Wife Bento (ラブワイフ弁当, Rabu Waifu Bento)", like her husband does, and when her picture is first seen by Tomo et al., Kimura refers to her as "Mai Waifu (my wife)". In the anime, when asked flat out by Tomo why she likes Kimura she responds that she likes how he's cool, causing the girls to think she has no taste. She then explains that his style of cool is just currently out of style, comparing it to how 1970s trousers are coming back in fashion, having been out of fashion for around 30 years. Tomo, Yomi, and Osaka all internally think that it's a bad and inaccurate parallel, and that she essentially has strange taste.

=== Miruchi and Yuka-chan ===
Miruchi Voiced by: Akane Omae (Japanese); Sasha Paysinger (English)
Yuka-chan Voiced by: Sakura Nogawa (Japanese); Mariela Ortiz (English)

Miruchi and Yuka-chan are Chiyo's friends from grade school. Despite having skipped ahead into high school, Chiyo still treats them as peers. In both appearance and name, they appear designed to resemble the girls' teachers, Minamo and Yukari.

=== Masaaki Ohyama ===
Voiced by: Hiroyuki Yoshino (Japanese)
Masaaki Ohyama (大山将明, Ōyama Masaaki) is the girls' bespectacled male classmate in 10th grade. In the original manga, his performance in the exam is good. His English language writing skill surpasses his teacher at the time when he first enters high school. Yukari nominates him as a class representative, judging by the fact that he wears glasses (a meganekko often appears in such a role in many manga and anime). This job continues until he resigns in September and yields the post to Chiyo Mihama. He also serves as the graduate representative in the very end. His character seldom appears in the anime.

=== Female Student A ===
Voiced by: Ryōko Nagata (Japanese)
A female classmate with black, braided twin-tails. Though appearing in the backgrounds of most episodes, her character rarely has a speaking role. She is a friend of Chihiro and Kaorin, interacting with them on multiple occasions. In Episode 1, she can be seen comforting Chihiro due to the embarrassment of being tutored by a ten year old Chiyo. Later on, she gossips about Sakaki's coolness with Kaorin.

Though a minor character, she has come to be popular, especially with western fans of the series. Users on the imageboard iichan dubbed her "Rachel Handlebarz" due to her twin-tails.

== Animals ==
=== Maru ===
Maru is a cat that used to live in Sakaki's neighborhood. Little is known about him, except that he was a "big, stately cat" according to Chiyo.

=== Kamineko ===
Kamineko (「噛み猫」, "Biting Cat" in Japanese) is a cute gray cat that Sakaki occasionally sees on the way to and from school. Having a great soft spot for cats, Sakaki tries to pet it, but it ends up latching its huge, beartrap-like teeth onto her hand. This becomes one of the series' biggest running gags. Kamineko seems to bear Sakaki strong malice, and at one point attempts to rally an entire neighborhood's worth of cats to attack her. Tomo has somehow managed to get her hands on a plush version of Kamineko, complete with bear trap teeth. Sometimes it runs away from Sakaki if she tries to pet it (having been chased off by Kagura at least once). Sakaki, however, was able to pet Kamineko even after it bit her hand, something which Kagura understood as "conquering her fear." At one point in the animated series, a delivery man is seen with the visage of Kamineko printed on his cap à la the Yamato Transport logo.

=== Mr. Tadakichi ===
Tadakichi-san (忠吉さん), also known as "Mr. Tadakichi," is Chiyo's pet dog, a Great Pyrenees, who has been with her for five years prior to her admission to high school. Mild-mannered and gentle, he is large enough for Chiyo to ride on his back and indulgent enough to allow her to do so. Sakaki particularly likes him because he allows her to pet him without biting her, something Kamineko has done at most, if not all opportunities. Sakaki also daydreams about being able to ride Tadakichi as Chiyo does.

=== Maya ===
Maya (マヤー, Mayā) is Sakaki's pet Iriomote mountain cat. His name is derived from Yamamaya, an Okinawan language name for his species. He is also known (by Osaka, at least) as "Pikameowmeow," or "Pikanya," from a corruption of yamapikarya, the Yaeyama name for the species. Sakaki met Maya on Iriomote when he was a kitten during a class trip to Okinawa, and he was the first cat to ever let Sakaki pet it. After his mother was killed by a car, he followed Sakaki home to Tokyo. Because of her mother's allergies, Sakaki cannot keep pets at her house, and Maya stays temporarily at Chiyo's house until Sakaki goes to college.

Maya can manifest an imposing "battle aura," which he used to scare off dozens of domesticated cats and protect Sakaki from Kamineko. In spite of being a wildcat, he is comfortable around people and even Tadakichi-san, and even lets Sakaki bathe him. Chiyo speculates that he imprinted on Sakaki as a surrogate mother. He once scratched Tomo because she was taunting him, but Sakaki hit him on the head and told him not to scratch people.

== Notable objects ==
=== Neco Coneco ===
Neco Coneco is a popular stuffed animal franchise that appears frequently in the series. Neco Coneco appears to be based on the real life toy franchise Tarepanda. The typical example is a white cat with a white kitten sitting on its head. Sakaki adores it, much as she does all cats. During the class trip to Okinawa, Sakaki buys an Iriomote cat version of Neco Coneco. Conventional romanization spelling of the pronunciation yields "neko koneko" ("neko" Japanese for cat + "koneko" Japanese for "kitten"); however "Neco Coneco" is often used and creates another joke in itself, Connected Cat.

In addition, Neco Conecos are heroes of "Journeys of Neko Koneko" (ねここねこのたび, "Neko Koneko no Tabi"), a series of photographs formerly on Azuma's website. A Neco Coneco doll also appeared as a festival booth prize in Yotsuba&!.
