= Yotsuba&! =

Japanese manga series

- Cover of the first tankōbon volume, featuring Yotsuba Koiwai

よつばと! (Yotsuba to!)
- Genre: Comedy; Slice of life
- Manga
- Written by: Kiyohiko Azuma
- Published by: ASCII Media Works
- English publisher: MY: Kadokawa Gempak Starz; NA: ADV Manga (2005-2007); Yen Press (2009-present)
- Magazine: Dengeki Daioh
- English magazine: NA: Yen Plus
- Original run: January 21, 2003 – present
- Volumes: 16
- Related media
- Nyanbo! (2016 anime spinoff); Azumanga Daioh

Yotsuba&! (Japanese: よつばと!, Hepburn: Yotsuba to!) is a Japanese manga series written and illustrated by Kiyohiko Azuma. It has been serialized since January 2003 in the monthly magazine Dengeki Daioh by ASCII Media Works, formerly MediaWorks, and has since been collected into sixteen tankōbon volumes. It follows the daily life of a young girl named Yotsuba Koiwai as she learns about the world around her, guided by her adoptive father, their neighbors, and their friends. Several characters in Yotsuba&! were previously featured in a one-shot manga by Azuma called "Try! Try! Try!" The phrase Yotsuba to means "Yotsuba and," which is reflected in the chapter titles, most of which take the form "Yotsuba and [something]."

The manga was licensed for English-language distribution by ADV Manga, which released five volumes between 2005 and 2007. Volume six was originally set to release in February 2008, but was indefinitely delayed. At New York Comic Con 2009, Yen Press announced that it had acquired the North American license for the series; it reprinted the first five volumes with new translations along with volume six in September 2009, and is continuing with later volumes.

The manga has received widespread acclaim from critics and audiences, with praise directed towards Azuma's art, writing, and the development of the titular character. The series has earned multiple awards and nominations.

== Plot ==
Fuuka (left on bicycle) and Yotsuba (behind) return from an overly-successful shopping trip.

Yotsuba&! is centered on Yotsuba Koiwai, a five-year-old girl who is energetic, cheerful, curious, odd, and quirky—so much that even her own father calls her unusual. Yotsuba is often depicted as being ignorant about things that a child her age would be expected to know—among them doorbells, escalators, air conditioners, and even playground swings. This naïveté and her imaginative view of the world around her are the premise of humorous stories in which she learns about—and frequently misunderstands—everyday things.

At the start of the series, Yotsuba and her adoptive father, Yousuke Koiwai, relocate to a new city with the help of Koiwai's best friend, an impressively tall man named Takashi Takeda, known as Jumbo. Yotsuba makes a strong impression on the three daughters of the neighboring Ayase family, Asagi, Fuuka, and Ena, after Ena meets Yotsuba trying to find out how a swing works. Most of her daily activities and misadventures often originate from interactions with these characters and more, such as Asagi's friend Torako, known as Tiger (from Yotsuba, the kanji for Tora is the same kanji in tiger).

The series has no consistent plot continuity—the focus of the stories is Yotsuba's daily voyage of discovery. Many chapters take place on successive days (for details, see List of Yotsuba&! chapters), so that the series follows, almost literally, the characters' daily lives. The tone can be summarized by the motto, used on chapter title pages and advertising: "Today is always the most enjoyable day" (いつでも今日が、いちばん楽しい日, Itsudemo kyō ga, ichiban tanoshii hi), or in the original translation, "Enjoy Everything".

== Development ==
In 1998, Azuma published a one-shot manga and two webcomics called "Try! Try! Try!", in which Yotsuba's adoptive father Yousuke Koiwai, Ena, Fūka, and Asagi first appear. Although some of these characters—including Yotsuba herself—are largely the same as in Yotsuba&!; Fūka has a different character design, a more mischievous personality, and a different spelling of her given name (in "Try! Try! Try!", it is written with the kanji 風 夏, meaning "wind-summer"; in Yotsuba&!, it is 風 香, meaning "wind-scent").

Azuma started writing Yotsuba&! a year after the conclusion of his previous manga, Azumanga Daioh. No crossovers between the two works occurred until the sixteenth volume of Yotsuba&! in 2025, which features a cameo appearance of Azumanga Daioh character Ayumu "Osaka" Kasuga, who is revealed to now be working as a physical education teacher.

== Media ==
=== Manga ===
The manga is written and illustrated by Kiyohiko Azuma, and published by ASCII Media Works in the monthly shōnen (aimed at teenage boys) manga magazine Dengeki Daioh since the March 2003 issue, with serialization on-going. Chapters have been collected in 16 tankōbon volumes.

In English, Yotsuba&! was originally licensed by ADV Manga, which published five volumes between 2005 and 2007 before dropping the license. The North American license was picked up by Yen Press, which republished the first five volumes along with the sixth in September 2009. Ten volumes have since been released. In addition, the series is licensed in Malaysia in both English and Malay by Kadokawa Gempak Starz, in France by Kurokawa, in Spain by Norma Editorial, in Germany by Tokyopop Germany, in Italy by Dynit, in Sweden by B. Wahlström, in Finland by Punainen jättiläinen, in Korea by Daiwon C.I., in Taiwan by Kadokawa Media, in Russia by Palma Press in Vietnam by TVM Comics, in Poland by Kotori, in Indonesia by Elex Media Komputindo and in Thailand by NED Comics.

Each chapter of Yotsuba&! takes place on a specific, nearly sequential day of a common year starting on Wednesday. The year was initially believed to be 2003, coinciding with the date of the manga's serialization, but Azuma has stated that the manga always takes place in the present day.

=== Calendars ===
Both monthly and daily Yotsuba&! calendars have been released every year since 2005, although a monthly calendar for 2009 was not released due to constraints on Azuma's schedule. The 2005 edition of the monthly calendar featured pictures of Yotsuba playing with animals such as lions, zebras, and kangaroos. The 2006, 2007, 2008, and 2010 editions feature photographs altered to include Yotsuba doing such things as playing with other children or reaching for a balloon. The photographs were by Miho Kakuta, with drawings by Kiyohiko Azuma. The daily calendars have a mix of original and manga artwork, with occasional captions, as well as other items—for example, the 2006 calendar had a game of shiritori ongoing through the year. The daily calendars run from April to March, following the Japanese school year instead of the calendar year.

The 2010 monthly calendar was released in November 2009.

=== Music ===
Two Yotsuba&! music CDs have been released, both purely instrumental, called "image albums". The music is designed to elicit mental images of events described by the titles. Both albums are composed by Masaki Kurihara and performed by the Kuricorder Pops Orchestra, who also worked together on the Azumanga Daioh soundtrack.

- The first album, Yotsuba&♪, released in April 2005, follows Yotsuba throughout the course of a typical day.
- The second album, Yotsuba&♪ Music Suite (General Winter), released in November 2006, depicts the season of winter, including Christmas and New Year's celebrations. "General Winter" (冬将軍, Fuyu Shōgun) is a personification of harsh winters, similar to Jack Frost.

=== Picture books ===
A Yotsuba&! picture book, Yotsuba & Monochrome Animals, was published on December 16, 2006 (ISBN 978-4-8402-3714-7). The book has pictures of Yotsuba playing with various black-and-white colored animals, such as pandas. The name of each animal is given in Japanese and English, along with the scientific classification of the species. Another book, called Find Yotsuba—which is actually a compilation of all previously released calendar illustrations— was released on August 31, 2013 (ISBN 978-4-0489-1879-4).

=== Anime ===
An anime spin-off based on cat versions of Azuma's character Danbo titled Nyanbo! began airing on September 26, 2016, as part of a "mini anime" program. This project did not adapt any of the Yotsuba&! manga. The spin-off airs in Japan on NHK-E and is simulcast overseas on Crunchyroll.

Despite its popularity and the success of Azumanga Daioh, no plans have been announced for an anime adaptation of Yotsuba&!. In an entry posted on his website on May 15, 2005, Azuma said there were no plans for it to be animated; he reiterated this on December 5, 2008, claiming that the stories and style of Yotsuba&! were not well-suited for animation.

== Reception ==
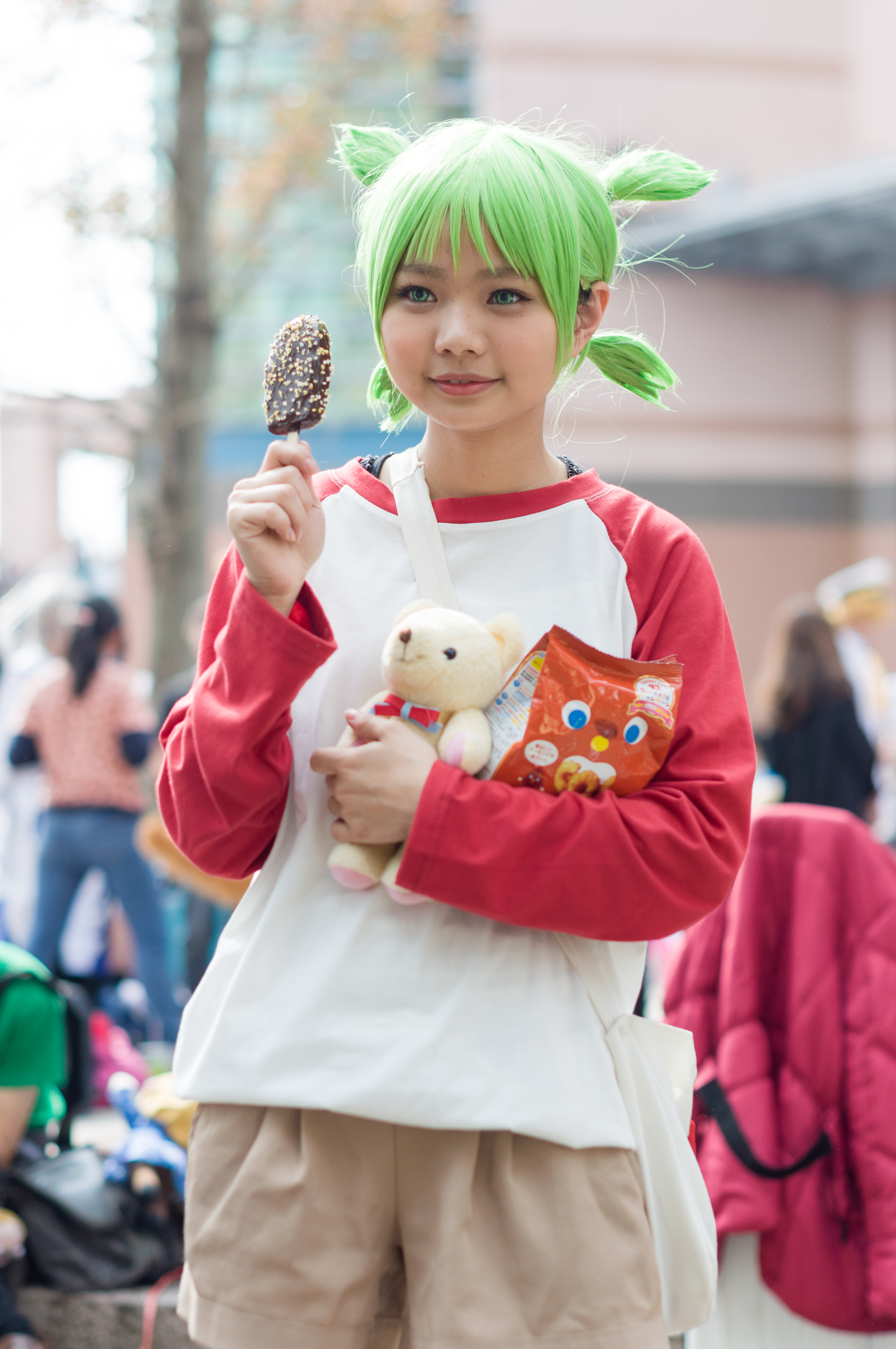
A Yotsuba cosplayer

Yotsuba&! is drawn not in the vertical four-panel strips of Azuma's earlier series, Azumanga Daioh, but in a full-page format, giving him more artistic scope. Azuma's work on Yotsuba&! has been noted for its clean art, detailed backgrounds, and expressive faces. Azuma is also praised for his joyous tone, slice-of-life storytelling, comedic writing, and eccentric yet realistic characters, especially Yotsuba herself.

The Comics Reporter described the series as "read[ing] like a love letter to the way kids can be at the age of 2–5," and a reviewer at Anime News Network compared Azuma's ability to capture "the wonder of childhood" to Bill Watterson's in Calvin and Hobbes. Manga: The Complete Guide described it as "a light, feel-good manga, like an endless summer day". Nicholas Penedo of Animeland said, "with Yotsuba, we find ourselves plunged into the wonderful world of childhood," calling the French edition of volume eight a "beautiful manga for children and adults." BD Gest praised Azuma's skill in designing distinct secondary characters, calling them "immediately recognisable", and saying that they each spice up the story in their own ways. However, Azuma has been criticized for creating characters that are "too clean, too perfectly functional", for overusing "outrageous expressions and reactions", and for dragging out jokes too long.

Yotsuba&! has been popular with readers as well as reviewers. For example, on Amazon.co.jp, volume six was the third best-selling comic in Japan for the first half of 2007, and volume eight was the second best-selling comic in Japan for 2008; volumes seven and eight both were number two on the Tohan comics chart the week they debuted. Volume eight sold more than 450,000 copies in 2008, making it one of the top 50 best-selling manga volumes on the Oricon chart for the year. The first five volumes of the English translation were each among the top 100 selling graphic novels in the United States in the month of release. Volume six of the English edition reached number 3 on the New York Times best seller list for manga, and it stayed on the list for four weeks. Volume 8 debuted at No. 2 on the manga best seller list. As of April 27, 2018, over 13.7 million copies of the manga have been printed in Japan and over 3 million outside of Japan, including the U.S., France, Germany, Italy, Spain, Russia, Sweden, Finland, Korea, China, Taiwan, Indonesia, Thailand, and Vietnam.

=== Awards and recognitions ===
Yotsuba&! received an Excellence Award for Manga at the 2006 Japan Media Arts Festival, where the jury citation praised the vivid characters and gentle atmosphere. In 2008, Yotsuba&! was nominated for the 12th Osamu Tezuka Culture Award and the Eisner Award in the "Best Publication for Kids" category, but did not win either, and was runner-up for the first annual Manga Taishō award. In 2016, Yotsuba&! won the Grand Prize at the 20th Osamu Tezuka Culture Awards, sharing it with Kei Ichinoseki's Hanagami Sharaku. The English translation was listed as one of the best 20 comics of 2005 by Publishers Weekly, one of the best comics of 2006 by the staff of The Comics Journal, and one of the top graphic novels for teens in 2008 by YALSA. Volume one was named Book of the Month in the June 2005 issue of Newtype USA.

There was an exhibit of Yotsuba&! artwork at the Gallery of Fantastic Art in Tokyo from December 2-16, 2006. The lead article of the May 2009 issue of the Japanese design magazine Idea was a study of Yotsuba&!, focusing on book design, interior layout, and how translated editions were handled.

Another exhibition of Yotsuba&!, featuring new original artwork by Azuma, was held at the Osamu Tezuka Manga Museum in Takarazuka, Hyōgo Prefecture between June and October 2020. The exhibition included over 200 production materials including advertisements, interviews, manuscripts, videos, and comparisons with overseas publications.
