= Cultural festival (Japan) =

Annual event held by most schools in Japan

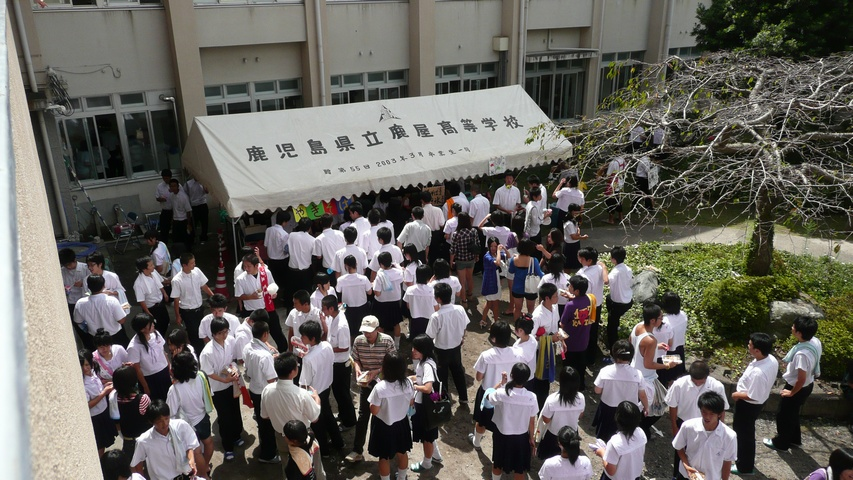
A school festival at a high school in Kagoshima

Cultural festivals (文化祭, Bunkasai) in Japan are annual open day events held by most schools, from nursery schools to universities at which their students display their artistic achievements. People who want to enter the school themselves or who are interested in the school may come to see what the schoolwork and atmosphere are like. Parents may also want to see what kind of work their children have been doing. The festivals are usually open to the public, especially at high schools and universities.

== Definition ==
According to the curriculum guidelines of the Ministry of Education, Culture, Sports, Science and Technology, cultural festivals are part of special activities and are defined as "events which aim to use the results of everyday learning to heighten motivation".

The cultural festivals are parts of regular lessons in elementary schools, junior high schools, and high schools, so the students are obligated to attend for graduation. In universities, the cultural festivals are placed as extracurricular activity, so attendance is not required.

Traditionally, most schools hold festivals on or around Culture Day (November 3), a Japanese national holiday. Normally it is held on a Saturday or Sunday; sometimes even both.

== Name ==
"Cultural festival" (bunkasai) and "university festival" (daigaku-sai) are common nouns in Japanese, so particular names of cultural festivals depend on each school. For example, the festival at the University of Tokyo, Komaba Campus is named Komaba-sai.

=== Names ===
Common names
School	English name	Japanese name
Nursery school	Daily life exhibition	Seikatsu-happyō-kai (生活発表会)
Kindergarten	Daily life exhibition	Seikatsu-happyō-kai (生活発表会)
Elementary school	Literary arts exhibition Learning exhibition	Gakugei-kai (学芸会); Gakushū-happyō-kai (学習発表会)
Junior high school	Cultural festival	Bunka-sai (文化祭)
High school	Cultural festival	Bunka-sai (文化祭)
University	University festival	Daigaku-sai (大学祭), Gakuen-sai (学園祭)

=== Variations ===
The school festivals of junior high schools and high schools may also sometimes be called gakuensai (学園祭), gakuinsai (学院祭), or gakkōsai (学校祭).

== Function ==
Festivals are held to display the students' learning, but many people visit a festival as a recreational diversion. Alumni often take the opportunity to visit schools they once attended. Food is served, and often classrooms or gymnasiums are transformed into temporary restaurants or cafés. Dances, concerts and plays may be performed by individual volunteers or by various school clubs, such as the dance club, the literature club, the orchestra club, the band club, and the drama club.

Cultural festivals are intended to be a fun event, but are also the only opportunity each year for students to see what life is like in other schools. They are also intended to enrich people's lives by increasing social interaction and fostering community ties.

== See also ==
- List of festivals in Japan
