= Kiyohiko Azuma =

Japanese manga artist (born 1968)

- Born: May 27, 1968 (age 58); Takasago, Hyōgo, Japan
- Occupation: Manga artist
- Writing career
- Years active: 1993–present
- Genres: Comedy, slice of life
- Notable works: Azumanga Daioh; Yotsuba&!

Kiyohiko Azuma (あずまきよひこ, Azuma Kiyohiko; born May 27, 1968) is a Japanese manga artist. From 1999 to 2002, he authored the yonkoma comedy manga series Azumanga Daioh, which was later adapted as an anime series by J.C.Staff. In 2003, he began Yotsuba&!, a slice-of-life manga series about the adventures of a five-year-old girl; it is serialized in the monthly magazine Dengeki Daioh.

Both the manga and anime of Azumanga Daioh have been praised for their humor driven by eccentric characters, with Azuma acclaimed as a "master of the four-panel form" for both his art style and comic timing. Yotsuba&! has received widespread acclaim from critics and audiences due to Azuma's artistic talent, writing, and the creation and development of the titular character, with the manga earning multiple awards and nominations.

== Career ==
=== Early career ===
Azuma entered the Department of Visual Information Design in the Faculty of Art and Design at Kobe Design University. About a year after entering the university, he began doujin activities in a private magazine called "A-Zone", drawing fan-made parody manga of Sailor Moon and other characters. Upon graduating from college, he received a Bachelor of Arts (Art and Engineering) degree. In 1998, Azuma published a one-shot manga and two webcomics called "Try! Try! Try!", in which Yotsuba Koiwai, her adoptive father Yousuke Koiwai, Ena, Fūka, and Asagi first appear.

=== Azumanga Daioh (1999–2002) ===
Logo for Azumanga Daioh

Azuma became famous for Azumanga Daioh, which was serialized from February 1999 to May 2002 in the monthly magazine Dengeki Daioh by MediaWorks; three additional chapters were published in Shogakukan's Monthly Shōnen Sunday in May 2009 to celebrate the manga's tenth anniversary. The manga was first released in English by ADV Manga, and later re-issued by Yen Press.. The series title has no particular significance to the story. "Azumanga" is a portmanteau of the author's name "Azuma" and "manga", while "Daioh" comes from the magazine in which it was originally published, Dengeki Daioh. In the anime, "daioh" is mentioned during the next episode previews, used in context with the meaning "great king". "Azumanga" is also used as a general term for Azuma's other comics and illustrations. Two previous collections of Azuma's works, including official tie-in comics of Pioneer animations, were published as Azumanga and Azumanga 2 in 1998 and 2001, respectively. Azumanga Daioh was later republished in a reduced-size edition called Azumanga Recycle.

Azumanga Daioh chronicles the everyday life in an unnamed Japanese high school of six girls: child prodigy Chiyo Mihama and her struggle to fit in with girls five years older; reserved Sakaki and her obsession with cute animals while certain ones seem to hate her; spacey Ayumu "Osaka" Kasuga with a skewed perspective on the world; Koyomi "Yomi" Mizuhara's aggravation at an annoying best friend; Tomo Takino, whose energy is rivaled only by her lack of sense; sporty Kagura and her one-sided athletics rivalry with Sakaki.

Secondary characters include homeroom teacher Yukari Tanizaki, her friend, physical education teacher Minamo "Nyamo" Kurosawa, and the creepy classical literature teacher Kimura. The story covers three years of tests, talking between classes, culture festivals, and athletic events at school, as well as time spent traveling to and from school, studying at Chiyo's house, and vacations at Chiyo's summer beach home and the fictional theme park Magical Land, concluding with the graduation of the main cast. It is generally realistic in tone, marked by occasional bursts of surrealism and absurdity, such as Osaka imagining Chiyo's ponytails being "unscrewed" from her head and an episode featuring the characters' New Year's dreams.

An anime television adaptation titled Azumanga Daioh: The Animation was produced by J.C.Staff and aired in Japan between April and September 2002, consisting of 130 four-minute segments compiled into 26 episodes. The compiled episodes were released on DVD and Universal Media Discs (UMDs) by Starchild Records, and an English-language version was produced by ADV Films. Before the series, a theatrical short and an original net animation were also produced. Several soundtrack albums were released, as well as three video games.

Both the manga and anime have been praised for their humor driven by eccentric characters, with Azuma acclaimed as a "master of the four-panel form" for both his art style and comic timing. However, he felt that he did not want to "limit himself to a niche topic" and decided to choose a topic in which he had little experience, and began serializing Yotsuba&! in 2003.

=== Yotsuba&! (2003–present) ===
Logo for Yotsuba&!.

Yotsuba&! is published by ASCII Media Works in the monthly shōnen Dengeki Daioh since the March 2003 issue, with serialization on-going. Chapters have been collected in sixteen tankōbon volumes. Each chapter of Yotsuba&! takes place on a specific, nearly sequential day of a common year starting on Wednesday. The year was initially believed to be 2003, coinciding with the date of the manga's serialization, but Azuma has stated that the manga always takes place in the present day. This allows the appearance of products created after 2003, such as the Nintendo DS Mr. Ayase plays in chapter forty-two. Yotsuba&! is centered on Yotsuba Koiwai, a five-year-old girl who is energetic, cheerful, curious, odd, and quirky—so much so that even her own father calls her unusual. She is also initially ignorant about many things that a child her age would be expected to know—among them doorbells, escalators, air conditioners, and even playground swings. This naïveté is the premise of humorous stories whereby which she learns about—and frequently misunderstands—everyday things.

At the start of the series, Yotsuba and her adoptive father, Yousuke Koiwai, relocate to a new city with the help of Koiwai's best friend, an impressively tall man named Takashi Takeda, known as Jumbo. Yotsuba makes a strong impression on the three daughters of the neighboring Ayase family, Asagi, Fuuka, and Ena, after Ena meets Yotsuba trying to find out how a swing works. Most of her daily activities and misadventures often originate from interactions with these characters and more, such as Asagi's friend Torako, known as Tiger (from Yotsuba, the kanji for Tora is the same kanji in tiger). The series has no consistent plot continuity—the focus of the stories is Yotsuba's daily voyage of discovery. Many chapters take place on successive days, so that the series follows, almost literally, the characters' daily lives. The tone can be summarized by the motto, used on chapter title pages and advertising: "Today is always the most enjoyable day" (いつでも今日が、いちばん楽しい日, Itsudemo kyō ga, ichiban tanoshii hi), or in the original translation, "Enjoy Everything".

Yotsuba&! is drawn not in the vertical four-panel strips of Azuma's earlier series, Azumanga Daioh, but in a full-page format, giving him more artistic scope. Azuma's work on Yotsuba&! has been noted for its clean art, and expressive faces. Azuma is also praised for his joyous tone, slice-of-life storytelling, comedic writing, and eccentric yet realistic characters, especially Yotsuba herself. The manga has received widespread acclaim from critics and audiences due to Azuma's artistic talent, writing, and the creation and development of the titular character, with the manga earning multiple awards and nominations. Despite its popularity and the success of Azumanga Daioh, no plans have been announced for an anime adaptation of Yotsuba&!. In an entry posted on his website on 15 May 2005, Azuma said there were no plans for it to be animated; he reiterated this on 5 December 2008, claiming that the stories and style of Yotsuba&! are not well-suited for animation. In 2006, Azumanga Daioh and Yotsuba&! were both selected as one of Japan's Top 100 Media Arts in the manga category. The sixteenth volume of Yotsuba&! released in 2025, which features a cameo appearance from Osaka.

== Personal life ==
In May 2000, he established Yotsuba Studio in Nerima-ku, Tokyo, with Hideki Satomi. Although he does not disclose much about his private life, in a blog post written in 2011, he has stated that he feels hesitant when buying children's furniture to use as reference for his manga because he has no children.

== Works ==
Title	Year	Notes	Refs
Wallaby (わらびー, Warabi)	1998–2000	Serialized in Game-jin	
Try! Try! Try!	1998	One-shot for Yotsuba&! and related webcomics	
Azumanga Daioh	1999–2002	Serialized in Dengeki Daioh; Published by MediaWorks in four volumes	
Magical Play	2001–2002	Character designs for ONA series Published by Dengeki Comics	
Yotsuba&!	2003–present	Serialized in Dengeki Daioh; Published by ASCII Media Works in sixteen volumes	
