= List of animated television series of 2002 =

A list of animated television series first aired in 2002.

Animated television series first aired in 2002
Title	Seasons	Episodes	Country	Year	Original Channel	Technique
2020	1	26	Spain	2002	Antena 3	Flash
3-South	1	13	United States	2002–03	MTV	Traditional
Ace Lightning	2	39	United Kingdom; Canada	2002–04	CBBC	CGI/Live action
The Adventures of Jimmy Neutron, Boy Genius	3	55	United States	2002–06	Nickelodeon	CGI
Albie	2	26	United Kingdom	2002–04	CITV	Traditional
Alejo & Valentina (2002)	3	20	Argentina	2002–17	LoCoARTS; YouTube	Flash
Andy Pandy (revival)	2	52	United Kingdom	2002	CBeebies	Stop motion
Audrey and Friends	1	26	United Kingdom	2002	Five	Flash/CGI
Baby Looney Tunes	4	53	United States	2002–05	Cartoon Network	Traditional
Bai Ge Dao	1	52	China	2002	Shanghai Television	Traditional
Bandolero	1	52	Spain	2002	Canal 2 Andalucía	Traditional
The Berenstain Bears (2002)	3	40	Canada; Hong Kong	2002–03	Treehouse TV; PBS Kids	Traditional
Betty Toons	1	60	Colombia	2002–03	RCN	Traditional
Busy Buses	2	39	United Kingdom	2002	Living	CGI
Chaechaepong Kimchi Pong	1	26	South Korea	2002–03	KBS2	Traditional
ChalkZone	4	40	United States	2002–08	Nickelodeon	Traditional
Clone High (2002)	1	13	United States; Canada	2002–03	MTV; The Detour on Teletoon	Traditional
Codename: Kids Next Door	6	81	United States	2002–08	Cartoon Network	Traditional
Cone Control	1	52	United Kingdom	2002		Traditional
Cyber Tribe	1	13	Malaysia	2002–03	RTM1	Flash
Cyberchase	15	148	United States; Canada	2002–present	PBS Kids; PBS Kids Go!	Traditional (seasons 1–5); Flash (seasons 6–present)
Cybertop	1	10	Germany	2002–03	Super RTL	CGI
Die D.I.A. Show	1	20	Germany	2002	RTL II	Flash
Daft Planet	1	13	Canada	2002	The Detour On Teletoon	Flash
Doodlez	1	50	Canada	2002–04	Teletoon	Flash
Eddy & the Bear	1	26	United Kingdom	2002	CITV	Traditional
Edward	1	65	Canada	2002–03	Teletoon	Flash
Engie Benjy	4	52	United Kingdom	2002–04	ITV	Stop motion
Esprit fantômes	2	52	France	2002–04	TF1	Traditional
Eye Drops	1	13	United States	2002	TechTV	CGI
The Fairytaler	1	26	Denmark; Ireland; Germany	2002–03	DR; Super RTL	Traditional
Fillmore!	2	26	United States	2002–04	ABC (2002–03); Toon Disney (2004)	Traditional
Fish Tales	1	13	Malaysia	2002–03	RTM1	Flash
Fred the Caveman	1	13	France; Canada	2002	Teletoon	Flash
Funky Cops	2	39	France	2002–04	M6	Traditional
Gadget & the Gadgetinis	1	52	France; United States	2002–03	M6; Fox Kids	Traditional
Girlstuff/Boystuff	2	39	Canada; Hong Kong; United Kingdom	2002–03	YTV	Traditional
Gladiator Academy	1	26	Spain	2002–03	Telecinco	Traditional
Harold and the Purple Crayon	1	13	United States	2002	HBO	Traditional
He-Man and the Masters of the Universe (2002)	2	39	United States	2002–04	Cartoon Network	Traditional
Henry's World	2	26	Canada; Germany	2002–04	Family Channel	Stop motion
Howdi Gaudi	1	26	France; Hong Kong; Spain; United Kingdom; United States	2002	TV3	Traditional
I Spy	2	26	United States	2002–03	HBO Family	Stop motion
In the Bleachers	1	28	United States	2002	ESPN	
Jungledyret Hugo	1	13	Denmark	2002–03	TV2	Traditional
Kangaroo Creek Gang	1	26	Australia	2002	Nine Network	Traditional
Kangoo Juniors	2	104	France	2002	TF1	Traditional
Kaput & Zösky	2	26	Canada; France	2002–03	France 3 Teletoon	Traditional
Kim Possible	4	87	United States	2002–07	Disney Channel	Traditional
Kitou, the Six-eyed Monster	1	52	Belgium; Canada; France	2002	TF1; Vrak.TV	Traditional
Kumba Park	2	26	Spain	2002–03	Antena 3	CGI
Larryboy: The Cartoon Adventures	1	4	United States	2002–03	Direct-to-video	Flash
Lauras Stern	1	52	Germany	2002–11	ZDF	Traditional
The Legend of Blue	1	26	South Korea	2002	KBS2	Traditional
Letters from Felix	2	52	Germany	2002–07	KI.KA	Traditional
Liberty's Kids	1	40	United States	2002–03	PBS Kids	Traditional
Little Ghosts	1	39	Germany; United Kingdom	2002	KI.KA	Traditional
The Little Polar Bear	1	13	Germany	2002	KI.KA	Traditional
Macius	2	52	France; Germany; Hungary; Poland	2002–07	KI.KA	Traditional
Make Way for Noddy	2	100	United Kingdom; United States	2002–06	Channel 5/Five; PBS Kids	CGI
Malo Korrigan	1	26	Canada; France; Germany	2002	Super Écran; M6; Canal J	Traditional
Max & Ruby	7	130	Canada	2002–20	Treehouse TV; TFO and Société Radio-Canada (seasons 1–2)	Flash
Mission Odyssey	1	26	France; Germany	2002–03	M6	Traditional
Mira Tú	2	12	Chile	2002–04	TVN	Live action/Flash
El Mono Mario	2	36	Argentina	2002–present	MuchMusic	Flash
Motel Spaghetti	1	13	Spain	2002		Flash
Moville Mysteries	2	26	Canada; China; Philippines	2002–03	YTV	Traditional
Mr. Bean: The Animated Series	4	182	United Kingdom	2002–present	ITV1 (2002–03); CITV (2004–19); Boomerang, ITVX (2025–present)	Traditional (season 1); Flash (seasons 2–present)
¡Mucha Lucha!	3	52	United States	2002–05	Kids' WB	Flash
The Mysteries of Providence	1	26	France; Hong Kong; Luxembourg	2002	TF1; ABC	Traditional
Old Tom	2	52	France; Australia	2002	ABC Television; ABC3	Traditional
Olliver's Adventures	3	39	Canada	2002–05	Teletoon	Flash
Olympus Guardian	1	39	South Korea	2002–03	SBS	Traditional
Ozzy & Drix	2	26	United States	2002–04	Kids' WB	Traditional
PangPond the Future World Adventure	1	10	Thailand	2002	Channel 3	CGI
Los Peques	1	23	Argentina	2002		CGI
Phantom Investigators	1	13	United States	2002	Kids' WB	Stop motion
Pig City	3	39	Canada; France	2002–04	Teletoon; ProSieben; Fox Kids	Traditional
Pongwiffy	1	13	United Kingdom	2002	ITV1	Traditional
The Presentators	3	20	United Kingdom	2002–05	Nickelodeon	CGI
Prezzemolo	1	26	Italy	2002–03	Italia 1	Traditional
Qian Qian Wen		161	China	2002	CCTV	CGI/Traditional
Rayons X		104	France	2002	France 2	CGI
RoboRoach	2	52	Canada	2002–04	Teletoon	Traditional
Rubbadubbers	4	52	United Kingdom	2002–05	CBeebies	Stop motion
The Shapies	2	27	Australia	2002	Nine Network	CGI
Simon in the Land of Chalk Drawings (revival)	1	13	Canada; China	2002	Teletoon; OTV	Traditional
Simplemente Rita	1	30	United States, Colombia	2002–03	Telemundo	Flash
Snailsbury Tales	1	26	United Kingdom	2002	CBBC	Traditional
Soup	3	30	New Zealand	2002	TVNZ	Stop motion
Space Hip Hop Duck	1	26	China; South Korea	2002–03	KBS	Traditional
Spaced Out	1	26	France; Canada; Hong Kong; United Kingdom	2002–03	Canal+ / France 3 Cartoon Network; Vrak.TV	Traditional
Spheriks	1	26	United Kingdom	2002	TV7	CGI
Stargate Infinity	1	26	France; United States	2002–03	Fox; Disney Channel; M6	Traditional
Super Duper Sumos	1	26	United States; South Korea	2002–03	Nickelodeon; Tooniverse	Traditional
Talis and the Thousand Tasks	1	52	France; Austria; Germany	2002	Télétoon; France 3 KI.KA; ORF 1	Traditional
Teamo Supremo	3	39	United States	2002–04	ABC (2002–03); Toon Disney (2002–04)	Traditional
Timm Thaler	1	26	Germany	2002	KI.KA	Traditional
Tomato Twins	1	13	Singapore; Canada	2002–03	Nickelodeon	Flash; Traditional (episodes 2–13)
El tonno	1	34	Germany	2002–03	ProSieben	Flash
A Town Called Panic	1	20	Belgium	2002–03	Canal+ Belgique	Stop motion
Tracey McBean	3	78	Australia; China; Denmark (series 1)	2002–06	ABC	Traditional
Tractor Tom	2	52	United Kingdom	2002–04	ITV	CGI
VBirds	1	6	United Kingdom	2002	Cartoon Network	Flash
Wallace & Gromit's Cracking Contraptions	1	10	United Kingdom	2002	BBC One	Stop motion
The Way Things Work	1	26	United Kingdom	2002	CBBC	Traditional
What's New, Scooby-Doo?	3	42	United States	2002–06	Kids' WB	Traditional
Whatever Happened to... Robot Jones?	2	13	United States	2002–03	Cartoon Network	Traditional
WinneToons	1	26	Germany	2002	KI.KA	Traditional
The World of Tosh	1	26	Sweden; Germany; Ireland	2002–03	SVT1; SVT2	Traditional
Yakkity Yak	1	26	Canada; Australia	2002–03	Teletoon; Nickelodeon	Flash

Anime television series first aired in 2002
Title	Seasons	Episodes	Country	Year	Original Channel	Technique
.hack//Sign	1	26	Japan	2002		Traditional
Ai Yori Aoshi	1	24	Japan	2002		Traditional
Ape Escape	1	76	Japan	2002	TV Tokyo	CGI
Aquarian Age: Sign for Evolution	1	13	Japan	2002		Traditional
Atashin'chi	1	330	Japan	2002–09		Traditional
Azumanga Daioh: The Animation	1	26	Japan	2002		Traditional
Barom-1	1	13	Japan	2002–03		Traditional
Beyblade V-Force	1	51	Japan	2002		Traditional
Bomberman Jetters	1	52	Japan	2002–03	TV Tokyo	Traditional
Cheeky Angel	1	50	Japan	2002–03		Traditional
Chobits	1	26	Japan	2002		Traditional
Daigunder	1	39	Japan	2002		Traditional
Deko Boko Friends			Japan	2002–11	NHK E	
Demon Lord Dante	1	13	Japan	2002		Traditional
Denkō Chō Tokkyū Hikarian	1	52	Japan	2002–03		Traditional
Digimon Frontier	1	50	Japan	2002–03		Traditional
Dragon Drive	1	38	Japan	2002–03		Traditional
Duel Masters	1	26	Japan	2002–03		Traditional
Fortune Dogs	1	39	Japan	2002–03		Traditional
Forza! Hidemaru	1	26	Japan	2002		Traditional
Full Metal Panic!	1	24	Japan	2002		Traditional
Full Moon o Sagashite	1	52	Japan	2002–03		Traditional
G-On Riders	1	13	Japan	2002		Traditional
Galaxy Angel A	1	26	Japan	2002–03		Traditional
Galaxy Angel Z	1	10	Japan	2002		Traditional
Genki Genki Non-tan	3	35	Japan	2002–06	Kids Station	CGI
Genma Wars	1	13	Japan	2002		Traditional
GetBackers	2	49	Japan	2002–03		Traditional
Ghost in the Shell: Stand Alone Complex	1	26	Japan	2002–03		Traditional
Gravion	1	13	Japan	2002		Traditional
Ground Defense Force! Mao-chan	1	26	Japan	2002		Traditional
Gun Frontier	1	13	Japan	2002		Traditional
Haibane Renmei	1	13	Japan	2002		Traditional
Hanada Shōnen Shi	1	25	Japan	2002–03		Traditional
Happy Lesson	1	13	Japan	2002		Traditional
Heat Guy J	1	26	Japan	2002–03		Traditional
Hungry Heart: Wild Striker	1	52	Japan	2002–03		Traditional
Jing: King of Bandits	1	13	Japan	2002		Traditional
Kanon	1	13	Japan	2002		Traditional
Kiddy Grade	1	24	Japan	2002–03		Traditional
Magical Shopping Arcade Abenobashi	1	13	Japan	2002		Traditional
Mahoromatic: Something More Beautiful	1	14	Japan	2002–03		Traditional
MegaMan NT Warrior	1	56	Japan	2002–03		Traditional
Mirage of Blaze	1	13	Japan	2002		Traditional
Mirmo!	4	172	Japan	2002–05		Traditional
Mobile Suit Gundam SEED	1	50	Japan	2002–03		Traditional
Monkey Typhoon	1	52	Japan	2002–03		Traditional
Naruto	5	220	Japan	2002–07		Traditional
Ojamajo Doremi Dokkān!	1	51	Japan	2002–03		Traditional
Overman King Gainer	1	26	Japan	2002–03		Traditional
Panyo Panyo Di Gi Charat	1	48	Japan	2002–03		Traditional
Petite Princess Yucie	1	26	Japan	2002–03		Traditional
Piano: The Melody of a Young Girl's Heart	1	10	Japan	2002–03		Traditional
Pita-Ten	1	26	Japan	2002		Traditional
Please Teacher!	1	12	Japan	2002		Traditional
Pokémon Chronicles	1	22	Japan	2002–04		Traditional
Princess Tutu	2	26	Japan	2002–03		Traditional
RahXephon	1	26	Japan	2002		Traditional
Rizelmine	1	24	Japan	2002		Traditional
Saikano	1	13	Japan	2002		Traditional
Samurai Deeper Kyo	1	26	Japan	2002		Traditional
Secret of Cerulean Sand	1	26	Japan	2002		Traditional
Seven of Seven	1	25	Japan	2002		Traditional
Shin Megami Tensei: Devil Children – Light & Dark	1	52	Japan	2002–03		Traditional
Shrine of the Morning Mist	1	26	Japan	2002		Traditional
Sister Princess: RePure	1	13	Japan	2002		Traditional
Spiral: The Bonds of Reasoning	1	25	Japan	2002–03		Traditional
Star of the Giants: Hanagata	1	13	Japan	2002		Traditional
Tenchi Muyo! GXP	1	26	Japan	2002		Traditional
Tokyo Mew Mew	2	52	Japan	2002–03		Traditional
Tokyo Underground	1	26	Japan	2002		Traditional
Transformers: Armada	1	52	Japan	2002–03	Cartoon Network	Traditional
Tsuribaka Nisshi	1	36	Japan	2002–03		Traditional
The Twelve Kingdoms	1	45	Japan	2002–03		Traditional
UFO Ultramaiden Valkyrie	1	12	Japan	2002		Traditional
Ultimate Muscle	1	51	Japan	2002		Traditional
Weiß Kreuz Glühen	1	13	Japan	2002–03		Traditional
Whistle!	1	39	Japan	2002–03		Traditional
Wild 7 Another	1	13	Japan	2002		Traditional
Witch Hunter Robin	1	26	Japan	2002		Traditional

== See also ==
- List of animated feature films of 2002
- List of Japanese animation television series of 2002
