= Sympathy for the Devil (disambiguation) =

"Sympathy for the Devil" is a song by the Rolling Stones.

Sympathy for the Devil may also refer to:

- Sympathy for the Devil (1968 film), a film by Jean-Luc Godard
- Sympathy for the Devil (2019 film), a film by Guillaume de Fontenay
- Sympathy for the Devil (2023 film), directed by Yuval Adler
- Sympathy for the Devil (album), an album by Laibach
- Sympathy for the Devil (audio drama), based on the television series Doctor Who
- Sympathy for the Devil, a novel by Holly Lisle
- The Orville: Sympathy for the Devil, a novella by Seth MacFarlane set during the third season of The Orville

== Television ==
- "Sympathy for the Devil" (Cowboy Bebop), a 1998 episode
- "Sympathy for the Devil" (Grey's Anatomy), a 2009 episode
- "Sympathy for the Devil" (Saving Hope), a 2015 episode
- "Sympathy for the Devil" (Supernatural), a 2009 episode
- "Sympathy for the Devil", an episode of Battle Creek
- "Sympathy for the Devil", an episode of Instant Star
- "Sympathy for the Devil", an episode of One Tree Hill
- "Sympathy for the Devil", an episode of Rizzoli & Isles
- "Sympathy for the Devil", an episode of Touched by an Angel
- "Sympathy for the Devil", an episode of Witch Hunter Robin

== See also ==
- "Sympathy for the De Vil", an episode of Once Upon a Time
