= List of Twelve Kingdoms episodes =

The episodes of the anime series The Twelve Kingdoms are based on the novel series written by Fuyumi Ono and illustrated by Akihiro Yamada. The series aired from April 9, 2002, to August 30, 2003, in Japan on NHK where it ran for forty-five episodes until its conclusion. The opening theme is "Juunigenmukyoku" by Kunihiko Ryo while the ending theme is "Getsumei-Fuuei" by Mika Arisaka. The entire anime series has been released on DVD and Blu-ray in the United States by Media Blasters, which are now out of print. The license was transferred to Discotek Media, who released the complete series on Blu-ray in 2019.

== Episode list ==
No.	Title	Original release date
1	"Shadow of the Moon, the Sea of Shadow - The First Chapter"; Transliteration: "Tsuki no Kage, Kage no Umi Isshou" (Japanese: 月の影 影の海 一章)	April 9, 2002
Yoko starts school, trying hard to maintain her perfectly obedient image. She reluctantly becomes the class president again, and tries to resolve the bullying of Yuka Sugimoto. Her dreams become more intense, and one day a blonde-haired man shows up at her school. The classrooms are devastated by a mysterious force, but she and the stranger are the only ones unhurt. She learns there are enemies after her and that only she can defeat them. After slaying the demonic crow that had been chasing her, she is transported into a swirling whirlpool, the portal to the twelve kingdoms.
2	"Shadow of the Moon, the Sea of Shadow - The Second Chapter"; Transliteration: "Tsuki no Kage, Kage no Umi Nishou" (Japanese: 月の影 影の海 二章)	April 16, 2002
Keiki has taken Yoko, Sugimoto and Asano into another world. They get separated during a youma attack. Yoko awakens on a beach and wonders toward a village where she is captured. The villagers call her a kaikyaku and take her to a jail where she finds Sugimoto. Sugimoto does not recognize her because her face has changed and also because she heard her talking to the villagers in their native tongue. Later the villagers are taking the girls to the palace for trial when they meet Asano who has also been captured. The group is attacked by youma called Kiki.
3	"Shadow of the Moon, the Sea of Shadow - The Third Chapter"; Transliteration: "Tsuki no Kage, Kage no Umi Sanshou" (Japanese: 月の影 影の海 三章)	April 23, 2002
The Kiki are the same kind of youma that saved Sugimoto earlier and so she thinks that Keiki is around. They are attacked however but manage to escape when Yoko fights them off with her sword. Later Asano tells the two girls that he saw Keiki change shapes and apparently die. Meanwhile, the King and Kourin talk about the free kaikyaku and that they must be destroyed. He sends a bird with Kourin to make sure this happens. Now very hungry, the three strangers make toward a village farmhouse for food and clothes. They are caught by Taiki, the owner, and Sugimoto tries to get Yoko to kill her. She does not and Taiki feeds and clothes them and promises them work. They head to another town with Taiki that is a three day walk. On the way they stop in a town and here Yoko has a waking dream where a man named Aozaru uses masks of people she's known to erode her beliefs and confidence. He tells her that everyone would be better of without her around.
4	"Shadow of the Moon, the Sea of Shadow - The Fourth Chapter"; Transliteration: "Tsuki no Kage, Kage no Umi Yonshou" (Japanese: 月の影 影の海 四章)	April 30, 2002
After her "discussion" with Aozaru they all stay at an inn. Taiki asks Asano to stay there while she takes the girls on so that they do not get recognized. After the girls leave, an old man hears Asano talking to himself and understands his language. When the girls reach the next town, Yoko discovers that Taiki had intended to sell them into servitude (as Aozaru had warned). They escape from the brothel and find a huge youma in the streets. Yoko is able to defeat it and afterward, she and Sugimoto are picked up by Asano and the old man. The old man from just before World War II ended, seems nice but in the morning they discover his intentions of betrayal. The three run to the woods and escape. Later when Sugimoto and Asano and talking and playing in the woods, Yoko is visited again by Aozaru who tells her how she cannot trust anyone, even her friends. Asano comes back and sees her with the sword and knocks it away thinking that she might kill herself. Sugimoto, seeing this, walks into the woods and sees Kourin.
5	"Shadow of the Moon, the Sea of Shadow - The Fifth Chapter"; Transliteration: "Tsuki no Kage, Kage no Umi Goshou" (Japanese: 月の影 影の海 五章)	May 7, 2002
Kourin tells Sugimoto that it was she that saved her when she first arrived and not Keiki. She then tells her to come with her and she does. Now Asano and Yoko are alone and hungry so they decide to rob a pair of people for food. Yoko remembers seeing the kid in the town before and cannot go through with it but, even when they are offered food she refuses thinking that they cannot trust anyone. Asano tells Yoko that he wanted to go with Sugimoto but that she would not let him. Yoko feels more and more alone. Suddenly a pack of Kiki attack them and Yoko fights them off but Asano falls off the cliff near the river. After stabbing the white Kiki leader, Sugimoto and Kourin appear. Sugimoto attacks Yoko telling her she's always wanted her dead. Kourin stops her at the last second after she injures Yoko's hand saying that now she's wounded, the youma will finish her off.
6	"Shadow of the Moon, the Sea of Shadow - The Sixth Chapter"; Transliteration: "Tsuki no Kage, Kage no Umi Rosshou" (Japanese: 月の影 影の海 六章)	May 21, 2002
Kourin is reprimanded by King Kou about letting Yoko live. He then sends Sugimoto away to the land that was promised her. Meanwhile, Yoko awakens to find herself in a cottage being cared for by a large rat that can talk. She's also visited off and on by Aozaru who continues to tell her not to trust anyone. Rakushun, the rat, realizes that Yoko knows almost nothing about the Twelve Kingdoms and so shows her a crude map. He also explains how babies are plucked from trees and not grown inside the mother's stomachs as they are on Earth. He suggests that Yoko travel to En because kaikyaku and hanjyuu (creatures like himself) are held in higher regard there than in Kou. Sugimoto arrives at her lands and is told she must stay there even though she wants to go back to the castle since she is the "chosen one". Later, as Rakushun and Yoko enter a city, they are set upon by youma, a flock of kochou, and Yoko draws her sword, relishing the fight.
7	"Shadow of the Moon, the Sea of Shadow - The Seventh Chapter"; Transliteration: "Tsuki no Kage, Kage no Umi Shichishou" (Japanese: 月の影 影の海 七章)	May 28, 2002
Yoko kills the youma with little effort and no thought for those around her that are being threatened. When it is over she sees Rakushun lying on the ground hurt. She thinks about killing him so that he cannot turn her in to authorities, but she runs off instead. In the woods she is confronted by Aozaru who wants her to return and kill him. She finally overpowers the control he has on her and swipes the sword through him, killing the monkey for good. He turns into the scabbard for the sword. Yoko returns but cannot find Rakushun. She finds the entertainer troop that she was about to rob earlier. They saw her fight the youma and ask her to travel with them for protection. When they finally get to the port to catch a ship to En, Yoko sees that it is crawling with troops looking for her.
8	"Shadow of the Moon, the Sea of Shadow - The Eight Chapter"; Transliteration: "Tsuki no Kage, Kage no Umi Hasshou" (Japanese: 月の影 影の海 八章)	June 4, 2002
Sugimoto is taken back to King Kou and asked to kill Yoko who he now knows is still alive. He makes Kourin cause her visage to change in order to better accomplish the goal. It is at this time that Sugimoto notices that Kourin is ill. Meanwhile, the entertainer group has decided to go along to En with Yoko. Sugimoto boards the ship also knowing that Yoko will be on it. Yoko never shows to board the ship as she does not want to get the troop in trouble for harboring a wanted kaikyaku. She rides on a smaller boat which catches up to the ship later, that's when Sugimoto sees her. Sugimoto has second thought though when she sees how Yoko has changed. This does not stop King Kuo from summoning youma to kill her though. Sugimoto, not wanting to disappoint the king, fights Yoko during the youma attack. Suddenly a huge water youma arrives that feeds of other youma and kills all of them, including the hinman inside Sugimoto. Sugimoto, seeing the hanjyuu boy that was so nice to her recently dead, passes out. She wakes up later to discover that the ship is now in En and there's no sign of Yoko,
9	"Shadow of the Moon, the Sea of Shadow - The Ninth Chapter"; Transliteration: "Tsuki no Kage, Kage no Umi Kyuushou" (Japanese: 月の影 影の海 九章)	June 11, 2002
Yoko gets off the ship and sees Rakushun. She apologizes for how she treated him and hugs him. Meanwhile Sugimoto is taken by a group of men to the office for kaikayu and hanjyuu can register and discovers a lot of the people there speak Japanese. Yoko and Rakushun check into a room and Yoko tells him about how Keiki brought her to this world. The next day they meet a teacher who gives Yoko more information on the land that she's now in. During the conversation, she tells him about what happened before she came here and they determine that she must be the rightful queen of Kei. Now, having determined that, Yoko and Rakushun go to see the King of En. On their, however, they are attacked by youma. Yoko can barely defend herself when a man shows up and defeats them. He introduces himself as King En.
10	"Shadow of the Moon, the Sea of Shadow - The Tenth Chapter"; Transliteration: "Tsuki no Kage, Kage no Umi Juushou" (Japanese: 月の影 影の海 十章)	June 18, 2002
Yoko, Rakushun and King En are attacked once again and Yoko takes out the leader so the rest of the youma disperse. King En takes them to an inn where they talk. Yoko says she's not a queen and yet King En thinks she is since he recognizes the sword that she has. He tells her that the scabbard is dead and that she will see visions (like Aozaru) until she has mastered the sword. She agrees to go to the King's palace but first runs to get Rakushun. Once at the palace, Yoko gets refreshed and then meets a handsome man she discovers is Rakushun's human form. Enki, the King's kirin, tells Yoko that Keiki is being held enchanted by an imposter queen in Kei. They tell her that she must rescue him and become the ruler of Kei. Faced with a decision, Yoko takes the night to come to terms with what she wants. On her way to her rooms, one of the King servants begins a story about King En and Enki.
11	"Shadow of the Moon, the Sea of Shadow - The Eleventh Chapter"; Transliteration: "Tsuki no Kage, Kage no Umi Juuisshou" (Japanese: 月の影 影の海 十一章)	June 25, 2002
One of King En's men tells Yoko and Rakushun the story of Enki and how he chose King En. Enki was abandoned by his parents after their town was destroyed by their emperor and they could not keep him anymore. He was rescued by a nyokai since he was a taika that had been born in Wo, Japan. When he became aware of En's fate he still swore to never select a king because of the horrible things they do. He went back through a shoku and eventually me the man who would be King En. After watching him and his actions he decided to pledge himself to him and choose him as king. This story is told to Yoko so that she can see the ways that kings and queens are chosen in the Twelve Kingdoms.
12	"Shadow of the Moon, the Sea of Shadow - The Twelfth Chapter"; Transliteration: "Tsuki no Kage, Kage no Umi Juunishou" (Japanese: 月の影 影の海 十二章)	July 2, 2002
Yoko has a vision in her sword of the previous ruler of Kei and how she ordered Keiki to kill all women because of her jealousy. This vision does not settle her doubts at all as she starts to wonder if she may do the same and whether or not she would be a good ruler. As she troubles over this, Jyouyuu, Keiki's hinman, leaves her body and tells her that he has witnessed and felt everything she has and thinks that she does have what is needed to rule. She goes to Heki's (the teacher) house and finds Sugimoto there. Now that Jyouyuu is no longer in her body, they both fight as normal girls. King Kou arrives and the truth is learned through Yoko's sword of his jealousy of the neighboring kingdoms and his campaign to keep Kei down so that he looks better.
13	"Shadow of the Moon, the Sea of Shadow - The Final Chapter"; Transliteration: "Tsuki no Kage, Kage no Umi Shuushou" (Japanese: 月の影 影の海 終章)	July 9, 2002
After King Kou's secrets are revealed, Sugimoto breaks down and Yoko hugs her. Kourin shows up in a horrible state of shitsudou. King Kou orders her to kill Yoko but then charges her himself. Kourin disobeys his order and steps in the way of his sword. Now that she is dead, King Kou will not last more than a year. With King Kou's defeat, King En gathers a force to help Yoko with rescuing Keiki and becoming the rightful ruler of Kei. After the battles are waged against the false queen Joei, Yoko has Keiki send Sugimoto back to Japan.
14	"Shadow of the Moon, the Sea of Shadow - Chapter of Recollection"; Transliteration: "Tsuki no Kage, Kage no Umi Tenshou" (Japanese: 月の影 影の海 転章)	July 16, 2002
Yoko and Rakushun talks about the happenings of the last few episodes.
15	"The Sea of Wind, the Shore of Labyrinth - The First Chapter"; Transliteration: "Kaze no Umi, Meikyuu no Kishi Isshou" (Japanese: 風の海 迷宮の岸 一章)	September 3, 2002
A little boy is punished by his grandmother and is standing outside in the cold. When he sees something, he trips and falls. When he gets up, he is in a different place, a sunny day where his grandmother's funeral is being held and a year later. His name is Kaname Takasato and Sugimoto has discovered that he's been to the Twelve Kingdoms and wants to find out more about him. Meanwhile Keiki and Yoko, soon to officially become Queen Kei, travel to Mount Hou. When they get to the place that Keiki was raised, he and Youka tell her the tale of Taiki. Before his ranka hatched he was blown by a shoku into Japan and his nyokai, Sanshi, looked all over for him. After ten years, Lady Gyokuyou found the boy and Sanshi was able to pull him onto Mount Hou.
16	"The Sea of Wind, the Shore of Labyrinth - The Second Chapter"; Transliteration: "Kaze no Umi, Meikyuu no Kishi Nishou" (Japanese: 風の海 迷宮の岸 二章)	September 10, 2002
The kirin Taiki's hair does not change to blonde when he arrives and everyone wonders at the rare black kirin called a kokki which usually means a portent of good fortune. Taiki learns of his new surroundings and his role in all this from the girls that serve on Mount Hou. One day he travels to the doors of the palace and is attacked by a man named Goson trying to claim the throne of Tai.
17	"The Sea of Wind, the Shore of Labyrinth - The Third Chapter"; Transliteration: "Kaze no Umi, Meikyuu no Kishi Sanshou" (Japanese: 風の海 迷宮の岸 三章)	September 17, 2002
Taiki has been told that he will soon have to choose the ruler of Tai. He begins to doubt himself when a kaikyaku girl begs him to send her home. Later, Lady Gyokuyou asks Keiki to come to Mount Hou and help the boy who still cannot change into his kirin form. Their first meeting goes badly but Keiki makes amends and transforms for Taiki to show him what his true form looks like. Keiki then help him in learning the powers that a kirin has over youma.
18	"The Sea of Wind, the Shore of Labyrinth - The Fourth Chapter"; Transliteration: "Kaze no Umi, Meikyuu no Kishi Yonshou" (Japanese: 風の海 迷宮の岸 四章)	September 24, 2002
The time has come for the doors to open on the solstice and for Taiki to try to find a new ruler. People from Tai have come on a shouzan to see if they might be the king. During the pilgrimage he meets Risai, a general whom he likes and gets along with her youma. He also meets another general named Gyousou who seems to unnerve him with his red eyes.
19	"The Sea of Wind, the Shore of Labyrinth - The Fifth Chapter"; Transliteration: "Kaze no Umi, Meikyuu no Kishi Goshou" (Japanese: 風の海 迷宮の岸 五章)	October 1, 2002
Taiki goes with Gyousou and Risai on a sugu hunt. Gyousou asks Taiki why he is afraid of him and he says that he's is like a fire, it can be good for many things and yet if it rages can do much harm. They later enter a cave where the meet a horrible creature. Taiki runs after Risai who was taken and Gyousou gets hurt. Taiki saves Risai from the youma called a toutesou and then attempts to tame it. Sanshi has shown up outside the cave and tells Risai that no kirin has ever tamed a toutesou. Hours later, Taiki's will overcomes the youma and he becomes his sherei. When it is time for Gyousou to leave Taiki feels sad and tells him goodbye. That evening he hears the girls talking about Gyousou and his feelings for him leaving cause him to run outside. On the way he transforms into his kirin form and finally finds Gyousou. He then bows and offers his loyalty, which Gyousou accepts.
20	"The Sea of Wind, the Shore of Labyrinth - The Final Chapter"; Transliteration: "Kaze no Umi, Meikyuu no Kishi Shuushou" (Japanese: 風の海 迷宮の岸 終章)	October 8, 2002
Gyousou's ceremony nears and Taiki feels bad because he thinks he just selected him because he did not want him to leave. They make it through the ceremony and then head to the Kingdom of Tai. Taiki still seems depressed and Gyousou wonders at this. He tells Taiki to take time to rest. As he is walking he meets Keiki and tells him why he is feeling so badly. Keiki stands and walks away. A few days later Taiki is summoned to the king where Keiki is also. They have been visited by Enki and King En. King Tai tells Taiki to bow low before King En because he is a ruler that is much respected. Taiki cannot bow however and the two other kirin make the point that no kirin can bow to anyone who is not supposed to be the new ruler.
21	"The Sea of Wind, the Shore of Labyrinth - Chapter of Reminiscence"; Transliteration: "Kaze no Umi, Meikyuu no Kishi Tenshou" (Japanese: 風の海 迷宮の岸 転章)	October 15, 2002
Another summary chapter where Enki talks about the Twelve Kingdoms. He passes through all the abodes of kingdoms.
22	"A Message"; Transliteration: "Shokan" (Japanese: 書簡)	October 22, 2002
Yoko contacts Rakushun through her bird and they correspond. She tells him everything is all right in her kingdom while he tells her about his studies. He has qualified for a scholarship but must learn to do more as a man so that he can ride a horse and shoot a bow. She tells him that she's visited his mother and thanked her. She also visited the children of the now dead King Kou. She also informs her that she's had news that could mean her friend Asano may still be alive somewhere. Although everything seems well with Yoko, Rakushun seems to think that she's not telling him everything but he knows she is strong.
23	"A Great Distance in the Wind, the Sky at Dawn - Chapter One"; Transliteration: "Kaze no Banri, Reimei no Sora Isshou" (Japanese: 風の万里 黎明の空 一章)	October 29, 2002
Suzu lived about 100 years ago. She entered the Twelve Kingdoms soon after her family sold her in Japan due to hard times. She soon becomes the handmaiden to a harsh mistress named Riyou. In present time, she hears about Taiki and how he grew up in Japan and travels to see him. Hou has a ruthless king and his daughter Shoukei is blissfully unaware of the mass murders that take place in the kingdom under her parents' rule. The king and queen are dethroned and killed in front of her in an uprising and she is made mortal and exiled to an orphanage. Yoko meanwhile begin preparing for her official coronation but starts to get visions again from her sword.
24	"A Great Distance in the Wind, the Sky at Dawn - Chapter Two"; Transliteration: "Kaze no Banri, Reimei no Sora Nishou" (Japanese: 風の万里 黎明の空 二章)	November 5, 2002
Yoko has many misgivings about being the ruler, especially with all of the arguments in her court. She is faced with decisions on a man's loyalty and other problems arising within her kingdom. Enki, King En and Rakushun show up for the ceremony and she confides some of her worries to King En. Suzu has learned that her mistress has returned from the coronation and that the new queen is from Japan, which gives her hope of maybe returning. Shoukei, at the orphanage, has let it be known that she is the daughter of the once horrible king. Now the lady in charge takes out her frustrations on her by doubling her chores.
25	"A Great Distance in the Wind, the Sky at Dawn - Chapter Three"; Transliteration: "Kaze no Banri, Reimei no Sora Sanshou" (Japanese: 風の万里 黎明の空 三章)	November 12, 2002
Suzu dreams of meeting Yoko and returning home. Uikyou, one of Yoko's officials, invites her to dinner saying that her cook has mastered some of the Japanese dishes. Yoko is told by another official about problems in the kingdom and she leaves it up to him to make the decision. Keiki scolds her for this and she gets mad. Meanwhile, Shoukei's secret gets out to the orphanage and everyone is enraged and wants her dead. The owner warns them that the Ruler of Kei has wanted her spared. While dining with Uikyou, troops storm in and accuse her of attempting to assassinate Yoko. The plot is apparently true and, when Uikyou pulls a dagger on Yoko, she is shot to death with arrows.
26	"A Great Distance in the Wind, the Sky at Dawn - Chapter Four"; Transliteration: "Kaze no Banri, Reimei no Sora Yoshou" (Japanese: 風の万里 黎明の空 四章)	November 19, 2002
Yoko is not happy with things in her court and takes out some of the frustration on Keiki. She continues to get visions from the sword. The villagers attempt to execute Shoukei for her father's crimes and the lord of Kei shows up to take to away - into exile from the kingdom this time and into Kyou. Suzu has had it with her mistress and decides to seek out the new Queen Kei. She winds up in Sai. Shoukei winds up in Kyou and is taken in by its very young queen. Yoko, meanwhile, has demoted about half of her court to non-political status and appoints Keiki to a position of power before telling him that she will be leaving the palace for a while.
27	"A Great Distance in the Wind, the Sky at Dawn - Chapter Five"; Transliteration: "Kaze no Banri, Reimei no Sora Goshou" (Japanese: 風の万里 黎明の空 五章)	November 26, 2002
Shoukei is not being treated much better in the palace of Queen Kyou. Riyou comes visits with the Queen Sai about Suzu and the queen tells her that she is in her custody now and that she is unhappy with the way she treats her servants. Queen Sai then tells Suzu that she must live among the people so that she can learn how things work in this world. She gives her money and a pass before she leaves. Yoko is also going out among the people so that she can learn how better to rule them. Even though Keiki is against it, he understands her reasons and requests that he be allowed to find a safe place for her to stay. Suzu runs upon some performers. These happen to be the same performers that she joined when she first came here as the old woman who was just a child then recognizes her. She meets Asano who does the bands accounting but has also become mentally unbalanced. He has a gun that came from Hourai that he bought from a merchant who did not know what it was. The raises the gun at her saying that the game is nearly over.
28	"A Great Distance in the Wind, the Sky at Dawn - Chapter Six"; Transliteration: "Kaze no Banri, Reimei no Sora Rosshou" (Japanese: 風の万里 黎明の空 六章)	December 3, 2002
Asano freaks out when the travelers return and goes back into the wagon. Suzu asks him to join her on her journey to see queen Kei but he does not answer. Suzu boards a boat and meets a boy who she saves from falling over the edge. Yoko's absence from the palace has caused a little concern. Her official story is that she is in En but Enki explains to Rakushun that she is actually learning about her people. Yoko arrives at the village just in time to save it from two youma. Shoukei cannot handle being in the palace at Kyou knowing that she once had all this stuff. She steals from jewelry and a youma and escapes. On the ship that Suzu took, she finds that Asano has stowed away. She and the boy she saved help him. Later Seishou, the boy, comes to ask payment for the pass he gave Asano. Suzu, still thinking that kaikyaku are horribly mistreated does like the way that Seishou is acting. Asano meanwhile thinks that Seishou is a spy who wants to destroy the world.
29	"A Great Distance in the Wind, the Sky at Dawn - Chapter Seven"; Transliteration: "Kaze no Banri, Reimei no Sora Shichishou" (Japanese: 風の万里 黎明の空 七章)	December 10, 2002
Enho, the leader of the village, knows who Yoko is. He teaches her about the basics of this kingdom and gives her advice. One day they see a boy who Enho used to teach but he runs away. Suzu once again saves Seishuu from falling from the ship. She tells him that he cannot know what it's like being a kaikyaku. He tells her about how his parents died from youma attacks and that he has no family or home any more. He then gets a headache and goes to rest. Shoukei has arrived in Ryuu and gets a room but the inn is full and so has to share with someone else - Rakushun. She is discovered by officials to be the person who stole Queen Kyou's jewels and she turns on Rakushun and they are both arrested. Asano, thinking that Seishuu is a spy, goes to kill him with the gun but realizes that he is now blind. Yoko sees a strange character enter Enho's rooms and hears them talking about occurrences within her kingdom.
30	"A Great Distance in the Wind, the Sky at Dawn - Chapter Eight"; Transliteration: "Kaze no Banri, Reimei no Sora Hasshou" (Japanese: 風の万里 黎明の空 八章)	December 17, 2002
Yoko gets some visions from her sword again warning her about assassination attempts and Keiki. In Ryuu Rakushun and Shoukei are set free thanks to a bribe from Shoukei. They then set out to find Yoko. Later Rakushun talks to her about her responsibilities as a princess and why she should have been more involved and stopped her father. She begins to see things differently after this. Asano and Suzu arrive at a port in Kei and set out to take Sheishuu to a doctor. Yoko goes searching for the people she say at Enho's and this leads her to a bar where she runs into the boy she saw the other day that ran off. His name is Seki and he helps her get out of a sticky situation there. Suzu and company arrive in the village where Queen Kei is and she leaves Asano and Seishuu to find a place to stay. Asano runs away from Seishuu after having another memory from falling off a cliff. Seishuu wanders after him and falls in the way of a carriage. The carriage continues on even when Seishuu does not move and runs him over. When Asano sees this he jumps on the carriage and aims the gun at the man who calls himself Shoukou. Yoko sees this also and picks up the boy who asks her to tell Suzu not to cry for him. When Suzu sees him die in Yoko's arms she begins to cry.
31	"A Great Distance in the Wind, the Sky at Dawn - Reminiscence Chapter"; Transliteration: "Kaze no Banri, Reimei no Sora ten shou" (Japanese: 風の万里 黎明の空 転章)	January 7, 2003
Rakushun and Shoukei talk together and he explains how the Twelve Kingdoms works. He is amazed that a princess knows so little of her home and surroundings. He also recounts how he met Yoko and their journeys together. Shoukei also tells him about her times after her mother and father were killed. Asano meanwhile talks with Shoukou and tells him about his adventures. Shoukou asks Asano to work for him.
32	"A Great Distance in the Wind, the Sky at Dawn - Chapter Nine"; Transliteration: "Kaze no Banri, Reimei no Sora Kyuushou" (Japanese: 風の万里 黎明の空 九章)	January 14, 2003
Where Suzu realizes that everyone is covering up the accident because of the ruler of the area, she begins to have doubts about Queen Kei and how this could happen. A man named Sekki takes her to an inn and introduces her to his little brother Koushou. They ask her to forget about the incident since the man who did it is protected by men higher up in the government. Yoko also finds out that the man who ran over the boy is named Shoukou. When she discusses it with Enho, he tells her she'll need evidence since she did not see who was in the carriage and that she cannot be seen to be above the law. Meanwhile Asano shows Shoukou his weapon and he's very keen to try and replicate it. Shoukou tells Asano about how he circumvents the laws of the gods and hunts people. Rakushin leaves Shoukei and gives her some money. She is on her way to Kei, now to find a job and not her original plan to dethrone the new queen. Keiki arrives in the village to get Yoko's signature on some things dealing with the government. Suzu leaves and Asano tries to get her to stay but she has nothing of it. Asano then sees Keiki and tells Shoukou about it. Suzu buys a touki dagger that is able to kill sennin.
33	"A Great Distance in the Wind, the Sky at Dawn - Chapter Ten"; Transliteration: "Kaze no Banri, Reimei no Sora Juushou" (Japanese: 風の万里 黎明の空 十章)	January 21, 2003
Suzu arrives at the palace but is told that the queen is not there. She decides to travel back to take care of Shoukou first. Yoko hears that strange men have been keeping an eye on her and leaves the area for a while. Suzu is found trying to get into Shoukou's house and discovers that there is a whole network of people willing to take him down when the time is right. Seki and his brother are members and they ask her to join them. The deranged Asano is used by Shoukou to find Queen Kei since neither of them knows what she looks like. Shoukei meanwhile sees a man about to be killed in a public execution. Thinking about her own kingdom before her father was killed, she throws a stone at a guard. Yoko, who is also in the crowd, helps her escape and also uses Keiki's youma to free the condemned man.
34	"A Great Distance in the Wind, the Sky at Dawn - Chapter Eleven"; Transliteration: "Kaze no Banri, Reimei no Sora Juuisshou" (Japanese: 風の万里 黎明の空 十一章)	January 28, 2003
Yoko makes it out of the town safely. Shoukei is aided by a man also and agrees to do some chores around their place for safe haven. Asano is sent with some of Shoukou's men to the place that Yoko is staying. Suzu helps out at the inn where she is staying with Seki and his brother. Yoko comes in and talks to Suzu who does not recognize her as the queen. After hearing what has been happening and how the people feel about her replacing a good leader with the one they have now, she leaves. Meanwhile Enho is captured by Shoukou's men as a wanted felon. The crazy Asano shoots the boy Kei Kei and, when the girl runs off, the men follow and kill her. Keiki warns Yoko about the smell of blood when they return to the village and Yoko discovers Kei Kei who is still alive. She sets him off to get help with Keiki and his youma and then discovers the girl's body in her room. She is clutching her seal, the one the queen uses for her official stamp, and realizes she was perhaps trying to protect her cover. One of Keiki's youma appears and tells Yoko that the wound on the boy was not caused by a normal weapon and that there were burns around it. She determines that she mist stop Shoukou before anyone else is hurt.
35	"A Great Distance in the Wind, the Sky at Dawn - Chapter Twelve"; Transliteration: "Kaze no Banri, Reimei no Sora Juunishou" (Japanese: 風の万里 黎明の空 十二章)	February 4, 2003
Yoko has decided to rescue Enho. Meanwhile the group of men that Shoukei is with decide that they must riot and hope to draw the queen's attention to the situation. Suzu's group move shop thinking that Yoko was a spy. They also decide that they must make a move against Shoukou. Suzu's group needs weapons and Shoukei's group need to raise funds. They wind up at the same inn with money and toki weapons for each party. Since not all of the weapons arrive at the same time, they must stay the night. They discover that they are about the same business and talk about their situations, much to the horror of the innkeeper. Shoukei tells Suzu that she believes that Queen Kei is really a good person but just is not aware of what is going on here. Yoko finds Seki and Suzu's group's new headquarters and, after a short talk, discover that they are on the same side. When Yoko tells them that she will fight alongside them, they ask her if she's got any touki weapons. Holding up her sword, she tells them that her weapon will do just fine.
36	"A Great Distance in the Wind, the Sky at Dawn - Chapter Thirteen"; Transliteration: "Kaze no Banri, Reimei no Sora Juusanshou" (Japanese: 風の万里 黎明の空 十三章)	February 18, 2003
Rebels begin striking certain targets in order to call out Shoukou's men. These attacks draw the attention of the group of men Shoukei is with and they can see the strategy involved. After most of the men have been drawn out of the castle, Yoko leads a group of 100 men to a safe house belonging to Shoukou and are able to take it and hold it. Shoukou sends more men from the castle and they arrive before Yoko's group can leave. As the rebels prepare to hold the fort, Yoko discovers that Asano in the house.
37	"A Great Distance in the Wind, the Sky at Dawn - Chapter Fourteen"; Transliteration: "Kaze no Banri, Reimei no Sora Juuyonshou" (Japanese: 風の万里 黎明の空 十四章)	February 25, 2003
Yoko leaves the safe house because the forces there are returning to the castle now that it is under attack. With Yoko's help and the help of Keiki's youma the rebels are able to get into the castle. Yoko confronts Shoukou and winds up capturing him, even though most of the men with them want him dead. The provincial army arrives and the rebel forces become trapped in the castle, especially since the villagers did not take up arms as they had hoped. Asano is set free by Suzu and he attempts to redeem himself by travelling to Meikaku and asking for aid. He is stopped on the way by members of the provincial army and killed, but an air troop arrives at the castle and helps to fight off the advanced air troops attacking the castle. Shoukei and the group she is with have arrived with reinforcements.
38	"A Great Distance in the Wind, the Sky at Dawn - Chapter Fifteen"; Transliteration: "Kaze no Banri, Reimei no Sora Juugoshou" (Japanese: 風の万里 黎明の空 十五章)	March 4, 2003
Yoko is upon the ramparts with Suzu and Shoukei and she reveals to them that she is the queen. She explains why she is in the situation that she is and asks for their forgiveness in being a lousy queen. The provincial army gears up for attack when a new army arrives, the rebel army from Meikaku. Everything looks good until the imperial army shows up flying the dragon banner. This army may only be mobilized by the queen so questions begin to arise as to whose side she is on and to the safety of the villagers.
39	"A Great Distance in the Wind, the Sky at Dawn - Final Chapter"; Transliteration: "Kaze no Banri, Reimei no Sora Shuushou" (Japanese: 風の万里 黎明の空 終章)	March 11, 2003
Suzu and Shoukei reveal to the rebels that they are friends of the queen, much to everyone's surprise. They ask everyone to wait on their suicide attack on the imperial army. Keiki arrives at the top of the castle and Yoko rides him out to the army. Once there she demands from the general to know who sent the army since she is obviously the queen and she did not. Once she gains their allegiance, she sends them to Meikaku to arrest Gyokuyou. She also calls for forces to be sent to her palace to arrest Seikyo who has been controlling things from there. Arriving back at the castle, all of the rebels are bowing to her. She then discovers that the forces that had come to help were under the command of Koukan and she vows to set things right with him. Much later, after the arrests are made and cabinet members are reordered, Yoko delivers her first proclamation as queen. She rescinds the rule that requires prostration except during formal ceremonies.
40	"Ally of the Moon"; Transliteration: "Jougetsu" (Japanese: 乗月)	July 5, 2003
Queen Kei sends Seishin to Hou with letters addressed to the interim ruler Gekkei. It is expected that he will be in charge but he has no inclination to do so. After hearing Seishin and reading the letter from Shoukei, the princess that he let live, he changes his mind and decides to take on the role of interim king of Hou. Seishin also delivers a letter to Queen Kyou asking for forgiveness for Shoukei. Shoukei instead gets banished from the kingdom of Kyou but that in itself is something as she is no longer hunted for her crimes.
41	"Sea God of the East, Vast Sea of the West - Chapter One"; Transliteration: "Higashi no Watatsumi, Nishi no Soukai Isshou" (Japanese: 東の海神 西の滄海 一章)	July 26, 2003
King En tells Rakushun and Yoko a story from his first years as king. Shouryuu is twenty years into his reign when his informants tell him about a rebellion brewing in Gen province by Atsuyu. Atsuyu usurped control of the province from his father. Gen has been prospering but the apparent lack of leadership from the king has caused Atsuyu to take more drastic measures, especially now that the flood season is upon them. The taiho Rokuta is taken prisoner to be held as a hostage in their bargaining. He is taken by a young man that Rokuta had met years ago who was raised by youma named Kouya. He is imprisoned with Lady Ribi, a minister appointed there by Shouryuu to keep an eye on things.
42	"Sea God of the East, Vast Sea of the West - Chapter Two"; Transliteration: "Higashi no Watatsumi, Nishi no Soukai Nishou" (Japanese: 東の海神 西の滄海 二章)	August 2, 2003
Atsuyu originally took over from his father because he allied himself with the previous king who was incompetent. Shoryuu appears to be taking things too lightly for his cabinet members and to the rebellion. The taiho even thinks he's an idiot. Shoryuu begins massing the army to head to Gen province and at the same time he begins to shore up the river banks further up. Lady Ribi cuts the magical thread around the taiho's head killing herself so that he may go free. What she'd forgotten though is that blood causes a kirin to become ill and Rokuta cannot leave.
43	"Sea God of the East, Vast Sea of the West - Chapter Three"; Transliteration: "Higashi no Watatsumi, Nishi no Soukai Sanshou" (Japanese: 東の海神 西の滄海 三章)	August 16, 2003
The river embankment is under construction causing Atsuyu to fear that the king is attempting to flood his town. A woman finds the ailing kirin and helps him to escape. Along the way through the tunnels beneath the castle, Rokuta discovers a man locked away there. Immortals cannot die by starvation but they become horribly weak and sickly. He finds Atsuyu's father, Genkai, in this state locked in a cell. Meanwhile, the woman that helped the kirin to escape is captured by Kouya. Kouya has been put in charge of prisoners and, unknown to Atsuyu, kills most of them. After interrogating the woman, he allows his youma to feast on her.
44	"Sea God of the East, Vast Sea of the West - Final Chapter"; Transliteration: "Higashi no Watatsumi, Nishi no Soukai Shuushou" (Japanese: 東の海神 西の滄海 終章)	August 23, 2003
Shouryuu secretly infiltrated the ranks of the Gen army and discovers Rokuta attempting to escape. The Gen provincial army attacks the men trying to shore up the embankment and townsfolk attack the army. This tells the king of En all he needs to known and, when the kirin is brought before Atsuyu, Shouryuu makes his presence known. The lack of confidence in Atsuyu becomes apparent and finally Atsuyu admits defeat. When Shouryuu turns his back, however, Atsuyu attacks him. He is killed by one of Shouryuu's youma guards. Later Kouya, Shouryuu and Rokuta confront each other. Shouryuu shows mercy on Kouya telling him that he plans on making a place that would be fit for him and the youma to live in his kingdom. Kouya flies into the distance on his youma.
45	"Sea God of the East, Vast Sea of the West - Reminiscence Chapter"; Transliteration: "Higashi no Watatsumi, Nishi no Soukai Tenshou" (Japanese: 東の海神 西の滄海 転章)	August 30, 2003
This episode is a summary of the previous stories.
