= Soup (TV series) =

- Created by: Jamie Canard
- Country of origin: New Zealand
- No. of episodes: 30

Production
- Running time: 3 minutes

Original release
- Release: 2002 – 2002

Soup is a children's claymation-style animated television series made in New Zealand which aired on TVNZ in 2002. It was created by Jamie Canard and ran for three series of 10 episodes each within the What Now children's TV programme. Each episode was around five minutes long and portrayed the lives of fictional creatures living in a swamp. The style of the series was inspired by The Trap Door, with a variety of creatures ranging from hideous rampaging monsters to small scuttling things, typically with big eyes on top of their heads.

== Characters ==
- Roger Lizard, who sometimes provides background information to the story and seems to look after the going-ons in the swamp. He has a book containing an illustrated list of the hideous beasts inhabiting the swamp, which he uses as reference when identifying creatures.
- Bronwyn and Flip, the main characters.
- Policeslug Nigel, a police officer in the form of a snail.
- Roland, a pink creature with a single hand atop one stout leg. The hand which carries its single big eye.
- A starfish-like creature with a name that sounds like a popping sound.

The only regularly appearing talking creatures are Roger, Bronwyn, Flip and Policeslug Nigel. Roland appears in several episodes, but talks in an unintelligible language.

== Creatures ==
Talking creatures:

- Two snails who deliver messages, typically between Roger and Policeslug Nigel.
- Two Grizzlefish, which prey on almost every other creature in the swamp, except the Bobfiend of which they are afraid.
- The Bobfiend, who likes to scare the Grizzlefish, but is otherwise quite harmless.

The swamp is also inhabited by a variety of non-talking creatures, some of which are named:

- Frog Monster
- Giant Jellymonster - afraid of snails, although it does not talk as such, in one episode it sings a somewhat comprehensible lullaby to Roland.
- Shrieking Crab - uses freaky moss as decoration of its shell
- Speeding Rocket Beetle
- Spotted Scaredy Menace
- Strobe - emits a blinking light when touched

== Flora ==
The following is a list of named plants and fungi in the swamp:

- Delicipod
- Exploding Fruit
- Freaky Moss

=== Original episodes ===
Season 1:

- The Strobes
- Grizzlefish
- Traffic Jam
- Mud Day
- The Games
- Song of the Banded Warbler
- Roland Gets Robbed
- Murky Depths
- Legend of the Bogfiend
- The Flatworms

Season 2:

- To Catch A Newt
- Fist of Orange
- Roger's String
- The Lost Egg
- Sports Day
- The Gap
- Skidplums
- Return to the Murky Depths
- Escape from the Murky Depths
- Freaky Moss

Season 3:

- Queen of the Hill
- A Daring Plan
- One Smart Frog
- Bronwyn's Potion
- Nature Ramble
- Slimey Justice
- Mudmonster vs Behemoth
- The Other Five Senses
- Spelunkers
- The Wide Piper

Season 1's ten episodes were available for sale for a short time on a single VHS video through Whitcoulls in New Zealand.
