= List of Heat Guy J episodes =

This is a list of episodes from the anime series Heat Guy J. The series originally aired on TBS in Japan from October 1, 2002, to March 25, 2003, and the first 13 episodes were later aired on MTV 2 in the United States. Each episode has two titles: one in English and one written in kanji. The opening theme is "Face" by Try Force. The ending theme for episodes 1-13 is "Kokoro no Sukima" (心の隙間; lit. 'Gap in the Heart') by WYSE, while the ending theme for episodes 14-25 is "Hikari" (ひかり; lit. 'Light') by Saeko Chiba.

No.	Title	Original release date	English release date
1	"Guy (City)"; Transliteration: "Machi" (Japanese: 街)	October 1, 2002	February 6, 2004
Following the death of Lorenzo Leonelli, his mentally unstable son Clair inherits the Company Vita crime syndicate. Meanwhile, Daisuke Aurora and his android partner J of Special Services Bureau's investigative team investigate the presence of illegal immigrants that may lead to a potential gang war in Judoh.
2	"War (Blaze)"; Transliteration: "Honoo" (Japanese: 炎)	October 8, 2002	February 6, 2004
Shortly after his official initiation as Company Vita's "Vampire", Clair triggers a mob war between the Leonelli and Wei clans. At the same time, Daisuke is informed of a smuggled ancient relic that may be related to sudden illnesses among the city's population.
3	"Bomb (Rumor)"; Transliteration: "Uwasa" (Japanese: 噂)	October 15, 2002	March 13, 2004
Judoh is rocked by a string of serial bombings. Meanwhile, several trading cards featuring beautiful women start circulating in the city.
4	"Chaos (Beast)"; Transliteration: "Kemono" (Japanese: 獣)	October 22, 2002	February 21, 2004
Boma, a criminal cursed with the head of a wolf, enters Judoh in search of his sister and is immediately hired by Clair to hunt down J.
5	"Doll (Child)"; Transliteration: "Warabe" (Japanese: 童)	October 29, 2002	February 14, 2004
Daisuke and J encounter an android boy that was recently acquired by Clair. J gets in trouble with the public when his battle with the android is mistaken for child abuse; further exacerbating the situation is J experiencing strange glitches in his system.
6	"Money (Desire)"; Transliteration: "Maku" (Japanese: 欲)	November 5, 2002	February 28, 2004
Clair sets up a moneymaking scheme that has Judoh crazy about commodities investment. Daisuke and J investigate the connection between the commodities market, the tomato farm on Agricultural Island 13, and illegal explosives smuggled in the city.
7	"Circulation (Revenge)"; Transliteration: "Katachi" (Japanese: 仇)	November 12, 2002	March 6, 2004
During a scuffle with a mercenary, Daisuke loses his bullet pendant - his only memento from his late father. He and J venture to the depths of the city's underground to retrieve it. There, they meet an unlicensed doctor and his nurse who has acquired the pendant.
8	"Brother (Sound)"; Transliteration: "Hibiki" (Japanese: 響)	November 19, 2002	March 20, 2004
Daisuke and J meet Kia Freeborn, a blues guitarist who walked away from the shadow of his famous father. They quickly discover that Kia is involved in an illegal arms manufacturing ring and is plotting to assassinate his successful half-brother Ray Dullea.
9	"Trust (Ties)"; Transliteration: "Kizuna" (Japanese: 絆)	November 26, 2002	April 3, 2004
While investigating a rumored string of passport forgeries, Daisuke discovers that Monica's mother Christina has been hanging around an underground smoke shop to feed her drinking addiction. Furthermore, she is dating an illegal alien, which is Daisuke and J's lead to their case.
10	"Guns (Bullets)"; Transliteration: "Tama" (Japanese: 弾)	December 3, 2002	March 27, 2004
While investigating a bomb threat in the city, Daisuke drops by the Narashino Army Base to check on the activities of the personnel. He is invited to dinner by the commanding officer only to discover that his granddaughter is Kyoko. Daisuke and J then discover the connection between the bomb threat and the 50th anniversary of the country's non-intervention treaty.
11	"Mirage (Illusion)"; Transliteration: "Maboroshi" (Japanese: 幻)	December 10, 2002	April 10, 2004
A string of violent murders committed by a mysterious woman leaves the police baffled while Detective Edmundo is suspended when he learns that his ex-girlfriend Elisa Ryan is the prime suspect. Daisuke and J discover that Elisa is a pawn in a murder plot involving mind control and holographics.
12	"Visitor (Light)"; Transliteration: "Hikari" (Japanese: 光)	December 17, 2002	April 17, 2004
Judoh celebrates its first festival in 18 years to coincide with the landing of the Celestials' ship. The Celestials, however, refuse to do their ceremony after they are ambushed by mercenaries. Meanwhile, a Celestial named Rhine wanders around the city, prompting Daisuke and J, Clair, and Boma to look for him before the Celestials decide to shut down Judoh for good.
13	"Encounter (Shooter)"; Transliteration: "Geki" (Japanese: 撃)	December 24, 2002	April 24, 2004
When Clair takes Rhine hostage, Daisuke and J are authorized by Shun to break into the Company Vita building and rescue the Celestial by sunrise, or the city will be sent on the verge of extinction.
14	"Arrow (Soul)"; Transliteration: "Tamashii" (Japanese: 魂)	January 7, 2003	N/A
Daisuke is given orders from Shun to head to the village of Siberbia, where he is to find a witness with information about the death of their father. Leaving the city, Daisuke and J meet a young girl in need of a guide and postpone their assignment to help her.
15	"Angel (Hostage)"; Transliteration: "Toriko" (Japanese: 虜)	N/A	N/A
A pair of thugs destroy J and kidnap Daisuke before delivering him to Clair, who injects him with a potent hallucinogen to humiliate him. With neither Edmundo nor the police willing to help her, Kyoko goes out on her own to rescue Daisuke. Note: Unaired episode; available only on home media release.
16	"Target (Flower)"; Transliteration: "Hana" (Japanese: 華)	January 14, 2003	N/A
When Shun comes within an inch of his life after being struck by a sniper bullet, Daisuke is quick to arrive at his side in recovery. Meanwhile, J and Edmundo investigate the assassination attempt and Clair senses a traitor among his ranks.
17	"Survival (Land)"; Transliteration: "Riku" (Japanese: 陸)	January 21, 2003	N/A
Finally able to set out on their overdue assignment, Daisuke and J arrive at Siberbia. Deep within a cave, a man having lived in solitude for 18 years dispatches his androids in order to keep those behind Marius' death in the shadows.
18	"Independence (Fissure)"; Transliteration: "Wakare" (Japanese: 裂)	January 28, 2003	N/A
Upon Daisuke and J's return from Siberbia, Shun disbands the Special Unit, reassigns Kyoko to the central office, and fires Daisuke. Meanwhile, Noriega has taken control of Company Vita and issues the syndicates a reward for Clair's left eye, which is the only key to Company Vita's gold assets.
19	"Truth (Heart)"; Transliteration: "Kokoro" (Japanese: 心)	February 4, 2003	N/A
Shortly after reopening Special Unit under his leadership, Daisuke attempts to recruit Boma, but the fugitive refuses the offer. Meanwhile, the Beastmaster, a scientist from Magnagalia Prison, arrives in Judoh to recapture Boma.
20	"Fake (Thought)"; Transliteration: "Omoi" (Japanese: 想)	February 11, 2003	N/A
SECT, the company that created J, is suddenly closed due to a lack of resources and a new android that looks exactly like J has just killed a mob boss. Daisuke and Edmundo investigate further to uncover the truth and absolve their friend of any wrongdoing.
21	"Tears (Friend)"; Transliteration: "Tomo" (Japanese: 友)	February 18, 2003	N/A
When Romeo Visconti takes it upon himself to learn the whereabouts of the financial wing of the underworld, Noriega has him eliminated. It's up to Edmundo and Daisuke to weed out those responsible for Romeo's death and bring them before the law.
22	"Fortress (Island)"; Transliteration: "Shima" (Japanese: 島)	February 25, 2003	N/A
Swiftly appearing and disappearing into the ocean, a mysterious woman from the sea murders sailors at night. When old tales surface of an island chain some 600 miles south of Judoh, the Special Unit commandeers a vessel and head out to the curious islands.
23	"Play (Father)"; Transliteration: "Chichi" (Japanese: 父)	March 4, 2003	N/A
When Monica's home is burned to the ground in a random arson attack, Daisuke offers her a job at Special Unit. At the office, Monica asks J to be her father for the day.
24	"Alteration (Mania)"; Transliteration: "Kurui" (Japanese: 狂)	March 11, 2003	N/A
With another attempt made on Shun's life, dire implications befall the city of Judoh. The military tanks, silent for fifty years, begin to roll out. Shogun is attacked and J's program is changed by a secret command buried deep within his system.
25	"Revolution (Snow)"; Transliteration: "Yuki" (Japanese: 雪)	March 18, 2003	N/A
Below the darkened skies of Judoh, military tanks patrol the city as Daisuke, Antonia, and Boma fight to save J. Shun tries to wrest control from the powers of Judoh, but Clair and Daisuke team up to oppose him.
26	"Guys (Real Man)"; Transliteration: "Otoko" (Japanese: 漢)	March 25, 2003	N/A
As Shun takes control of Judoh's government, Clair, having reclaimed his title as Vampire, rallies all of the mob families to combat the coup d'etat faction while Daisuke storms though the capital to confront his elder brother and bring an end to the city's crisis.
