= List of Tenchi Muyo! GXP episodes =

Tenchi Muyo! GXP (天地無用!GXP, Tenchi Muyō! Jī Ekkusu Pī) is an anime spin-off of Tenchi Muyo! Ryo-Ohki. It first appeared on NTV on April 3, 2002, before the show ended on September 25, 2002.

== Episode list ==
No.	Title	Original release date	English air date
1	"Seize The Day"; Transliteration: "Ame nochi Kiri Tokidoki Fukō (Rain, Followed by Fog, With Some Occasional Bad Luck)" (Japanese: 雨のち霧、ときどき不幸)	April 3, 2002	November 11, 2012
Seina Yamada, a Japanese high school student with the worst case of bad luck, is nearly drowned by a crashing spaceship in his neighborhood. Luckily, he is saved by an unknown blonde woman who gives him an application to the Galaxy Police (GP). After his family force him to fill it out and sign it, Seina wakes up to find himself on a spaceship sent to fetch him while he was sleeping!
2	"Invasion"; Transliteration: "Keisatsu to Kaizoku (Police and Pirates)" (Japanese: 警察と海賊)	April 10, 2002	November 18, 2012
Seina learns a bit more about the GP, but the ship is later targeted by a band of space pirates.
3	"The Devil Princess of Jurai"; Transliteration: "Jūrai no Onihime" (Japanese: 樹雷の鬼姫)	April 17, 2002	November 25, 2012
Seina and his party are saved by the intervention of Lady Seto's ship, the Mikagami, and invited on board. Seto warns Seina that people of Earth origins are not accepted in the GP, so he must find a way to prove himself worthy of being a GP cadet or be sent back to Earth with his memories erased. Seina later encounters Ryoko, a space pirate, who wants him on her side.
4	"True Love, Truly Painful"; Transliteration: "Kiri no Magire, Yarazu no Ame (Fog of Confusion, Rain of Hindrance)" (Japanese: 霧の紛れ、遣らずの雨)	April 24, 2002	December 2, 2012
After arriving at GP Headquarters, Seina is stunned to see Kiriko as an immigration officer to the GP Academy, and she begs him to return to Earth immediately; however, he decides to stay and is accepted into the academy. Later, he also encounters Seiryo Tennan, who hates Earth people with a passion, and Kiriko and Amane are assigned to the academy as teachers.
5	"Seeing is Believing"; Transliteration: "Kurayami to Amai Wana (Darkness and a Sweet Trap)" (Japanese: 暗闇と甘い罠)	May 1, 2002	December 9, 2012
Seina, Kenneth and Rajau sneak out of the GP Academy dorms after curfew to have a good time. They encounter Amane, but she turns out to be an imposter and the trio find out that they are to become part of a covert experiment.
6	"First Tests"; Transliteration: "Jī Pī Akademī Nyūgaku (Entering the GP Academy)" (Japanese: GPアカデミー入学)	May 8, 2002	December 16, 2012
Seina is under pressure because without the GP body enhancement procedure, he won't be able to keep with his classmates ... and Seiryo knows it and is determined to make him quit the academy. Later, Kiriko warns Seina that the procedure can make him an outcast with the rest of Earth society if they find out that he was enhanced by non-Earth medical methods and begs him again to return to Earth.
7	"Moving In"; Transliteration: "Dōkyotte Koto De (Living Together)" (Japanese: 同居ってことで)	May 15, 2002	December 23, 2012
Seina is having difficulty in getting used to his enhanced body, so Amane invites him to stay at her residence to train him to cope with the changes. However, things get a bit awkward when Kiriko and Erma also arrive at Amane's place to assist in Seina's "training" and Seiryo is outraged that Seina is now living with Amane.
8	"Meet the Parents"; Transliteration: "Zakkyo Jidai (Days of Living Cheek By Jowl)" (Japanese: 雑居時代)	May 22, 2002	December 30, 2012
Seina's day-to-day living with three beautiful girls is causing daily problems. Under Amane's supervision, he gets some rather unusual training, but she then gets an unexpected visit from her parents. NB (whose programming Amane has altered for the worse) proves no help at all, Seiryo proves another unwelcome visitor and both Kiriko and Erma (and later Seiryo) hear things that send them rushing back to Amane's house.
9	"A Stormy Voyage"; Transliteration: "Haran no Uchū Kenshū Kōkai (A Stormy Space Training Voyage)" (Japanese: 波乱の宇宙研修航海)	May 29, 2002	January 6, 2013
After getting his body enhancement problems under control, Seina is assigned to a training vessel captained by Seiryo (with Amane as First Officer) on a minor cargo mission. Naturally, things don't go as planned when the GP cargo ship breaks down and space pirates under the command of Kyo Komachi attack, capturing Seiryo in the process.
10	"Baptism"; Transliteration: "Senrei" (Japanese: 洗礼)	June 5, 2002	January 13, 2013
The GP assigns Seina and his bad luck as bait to lure in space pirates before apprehending them. However, his bad luck may get him killed when, in Mitoto's company, he accidentally wanders onto a GP warship which is attacked by Tarant Shank, a notoriously vicious space pirate who is determined to kill Seina.
11	"First Paychecks"; Transliteration: "Hakkyūryō to Purezento (First Paycheck and Presents)" (Japanese: 初給料とプレゼント)	June 12, 2002	January 20, 2013
Now captain of a GP pirate decoy ship, Seina and his crew get their first pay checks. Unfortunately, Seina is blackmailed into doing some special shopping for NB, and a very suspicious Amane and Kiriko follow him everywhere. Meanwhile, the Daluma Pirate Council decides that Seina is too dangerous to exist and orders Ryoko to have him assassinated.
12	"The Vengeful and the Wounded"; Transliteration: "Kamidake Taiha (Kamidake Seriously Damaged)" (Japanese: 守蛇怪大破)	June 19, 2002	January 27, 2013
After rescuing an escape pod, Seina and the crew are tasked by its occupant to deliver a sealed box to Lady Seto on Jurai. On the way, space pirate after space pirate go after them for the box and its contents, causing their supplies and morale to fall dangerously low, but a couple of unexpected arrivals may save the day (and their sanity).
13	"Old Reveals and New Deals"; Transliteration: "Jūrai ni te (On Jurai)" (Japanese: 樹雷にて)	June 26, 2002	February 3, 2013
While Seina and his crew shelter on Jurai after their long chase by the pirates, Lady Seto drags Ryoko, Kiriko and Amane into matchmaking ploys while having fun with Seina by sending her court ladies after him. Later, certain facts about Ryoko and her past are revealed that surprise everyone, including her. Lady Seto gives Seina a new ship called the Kamidake II and also tasks him with an escort mission to GP headquarters for a mysterious girl named Neju.
14	"Neju Who?"; Transliteration: "Chīsana Kyōteki Genru! (A Tiny Adversary Appears!)" (Japanese: 小さな強敵現る!)	July 3, 2002	February 10, 2013
Seina's mission to transport Neju to GP Headquarters gets more dangerous when he is strictly ordered not to use the ship's weapon systems, and a startling new member joins the crew. In the meantime, the girls learn a shocking fact about their passenger, who seems to be getting too close to Seina for their comfort.
15	"Runaway Fuku"; Transliteration: "Fuku-chan no Iede" (Japanese: 福ちゃんの家出)	July 10, 2002	February 17, 2013
When Fuku can't handle the stress of combat, Kiriko suggests an alternative method to control the Kamidake II. Feeling neglected and rejected by everyone except Seina, Fuku runs away on board the Kamidake II with Seina as a reluctant passenger, but when space pirates attack Fuku's help will be needed to protect the ship.
16	"Homecoming"; Transliteration: "Kisei" (Japanese: 帰省)	July 17, 2002	February 24, 2013
Seina and the others are granted some vacation time and plan to spend it back on Earth, but the plan may be spoiled when they respond to a distress call. When they finally reach Earth, Amane and Ryoko make quite an impression on Seina's parents; NB falls for Yoshiko, Seina's younger sister; and an unexpected guest joins the party.
17	"Getting Reacquainted"; Transliteration: "Seina to Tenchi (Seina and Tenchi)" (Japanese: 西南と天地)	July 24, 2002	March 3, 2013
During his visit home, Seina meets up with Tenchi and the other members of Tenchi's household and seeks out Washu for answers about Fuku while the girls help out in the Yamada store.
18	"The Price of Fortune"; Transliteration: "Kōfuku o Tsukamu Hitobito (Those Who Bear Good Fortune)" (Japanese: 幸福を掴む人々)	July 31, 2002	March 10, 2013
A pirate fleet under the command of General Daluma called the Good Luck Fleet faces the Kamidake II in battle and is totally defeated; as a reward, Seina and his team are given a beach-side vacation. Meanwhile, Seiryo, who has defected to the pirates (under orders from his father, who has a business deal with the Daluma pirate guild), is given the opportunity to command the Good Luck Fleet and searches for good luck charms and lucky personnel to protect the fleet from being defeated again.
19	"Seiryo Attacks"; Transliteration: "Shō (Show)" (Japanese: ショー)	August 7, 2002	March 24, 2013
Seiryo's ship, the Unko, proves too strong for Seina's Kamidake. While the ship is being repaired, Amane is convinced to take part of a fashion show for the GP, and her past catches up with her when she faces off against a rival from her modeling days.
20	"Beware the Unko!"; Transliteration: "Un o Yobu Fune (The Ship That Brings Luck)" (Japanese: 運を呼ぶ船)	August 14, 2002	March 31, 2013
Returning to Jurai to upgrade the Kamidake after an inconclusive battle with Seiryo and the Unko, Seina's problems pile up with Seto's handmaidens all chasing after him, Amane, Ryoko and Neju nowhere to be found and Kiriko making a choice that could change things forever for her ship, her crewmates and herself.
21	"Reckoning"; Transliteration: "Okoshi•Uketamawa•Yui (Introduction, Development, Conclusion)" (Japanese: 起・承・結)	August 21, 2002	April 7, 2013
With Kiriko now partnering the Royal Tree Mizuki, it merges with the Kamidake to create an even more powerful ship. On their first mission to find the Unko (with Seto, Airi and Mitoto also aboard), the Kamidake II stumbles on the secret hideout of the Daluma Pirate Guild while the Unko's good luck proves too good.
22	"Duel"; Transliteration: "Un Tai Fuun no Kettō (Showdown Between Good Luck and Bad Luck)" (Japanese: 運対不運の決闘)	August 28, 2002	April 14, 2013
Despite the elimination of the Guild, Seiryo and the Unko still plan to defeat Seina for good. In order to beat Seiryo at his own game, Airi and Lady Seto organize a public duel between the two.
23	"Pursuit"; Transliteration: "Tsuiseki" (Japanese: 追跡)	September 4, 2002	April 21, 2013
With the defeat of Seiryo and the end of the Daluma Guild, Seina's squad is disbanded and renegade officials of the Galaxy Army become interested with Seina's ship. Fuku and the Kamidake are taken by GA personnel and Seina goes after them. Seina's crew are arrested by GA soldiers for hijacking their own ship while Seina gets stranded on an unknown planet that has been taken over by a familiar enemy.
24	"Parallel"; Transliteration: "Parare•ru…?! (Parallel…!?)" (Japanese: ぱられ・ル……!?)	September 11, 2002	April 28, 2013
Hiding from Tarant's forces with the Wau villagers, Seina discovers an ancient and extremely powerful mech on the planet which may help him to rescue Fuku and defeat the pirates and rogue GA. Meanwhile, Kiriko and the others try to figure out what happened to the Kamidake and who ordered their arrest.
25	"Graduation"; Transliteration: "Sotsugyō" (Japanese: 卒業)	September 18, 2002	May 5, 2013
Seina and the others part ways as Seina is about to graduate with the rest of his class. However, in a meeting with the Juraian Royal Family, Seina is told about a shocking discovery that may change his entire life and future. And things don't end with graduation: the GP wants to reform Seina's unit again and Lady Seto plans an event that will complicate Seina's life even more!
26	"Final Engagement"; Transliteration: "Tsuki no Chigiri (Lunar Vows)" (Japanese: 月の契り)	September 25, 2002	May 12, 2013
Seina is shocked to learn that he is to marry Amane, Kiriko, Ryoko and Neju for political reasons under Juraian blessing, but are the girls willing? Tarant returns to try and eliminate Seina for good. Later on, before the wedding Lady Seto's four court ladies kidnap Seina for their own reasons, and the four brides take off in hot pursuit of the culprits and their captive.

== OVAs ==
=== Tenchi Muyo! GXP Paradise Starting (2023) ===
No.	Title	Original release date
OVA–1	"Back... to my old home? From Renza-"; Transliteration: "Natsukashi no Wahaya…e? Renza yori―" (Japanese: 懐かしの我が家…へ？ 簾座より―)	May 26, 2023
Seina Yamada, now a grown adult, returns to Earth after spending time in Renza. Many things have changed back home while he's been in space, namely his new living arrangements with Tsukiko Masaki, his mother-in-law.
OVA–2	"Cheerful Farm Village Life"; Transliteration: "Akarui♥Nōson Seikatsu" (Japanese: 明るい♥農村生活)	June 30, 2023
OVA–3	"A friend calls Vermillion"; Transliteration: "Rui wa Tomo Yobi Shu ni Majiwaru" (Japanese: 類は友呼び 朱に交わる)	July 28, 2023
OVA–4	"Tenchi Turbulence"; Transliteration: "Tenchi Sōzō" (Japanese: 天地 騒造)	August 25, 2023
OVA–5	"Tsukikage Tapping Door"; Transliteration: "Tsukikage Kōhi" (Japanese: 月影叩扉)	September 29, 2023
OVA–6	"Welcome to Paradise!"; Transliteration: "Paradaisu e Yōkoso!" (Japanese: パラダイスへようこそ！)	October 27, 2023
