= List of Tokyo Underground episodes =

This is a list of episodes of the Japanese anime Tokyo Underground. The anime premiered on the TV Tokyo television network on April 2, 2002, and ended on September 24, 2002, containing twenty-six episodes. It was animated by Studio Pierrot. The TV series was released on DVD by Geneon Entertainment in the US and Canada, released as a boxset by Manga Entertainment in the UK and by Tokyo Night Train in Australia. It also aired in Canada on the digital channel G4techTV Canada, starting on July 22, 2007, at 8:30 pm ET/PT. English Airdates listed below are from the Canadian TV Broadcast.

== Episode list ==
No.	Title	Original release date	English release date
1	"The Surface - The Fateful Encounter"; Transliteration: "Chijō - Unmei no Deai" (Japanese: 地上 運命の出会い)	April 2, 2002	July 22, 2007
2	"Resurrection - The Maiden of Life"; Transliteration: "Hangon - Seimei no Miko" (Japanese: 反魂 生命の巫女)	April 9, 2002	July 29, 2007
3	"The Awakening - When the Wind Blows"; Transliteration: "Kakusei - Kaze, Ugoku Toki" (Japanese: 覚醒 風・動くとき)	April 16, 2002	August 5, 2007
4	"Full Moon - Ruri's Wish"; Transliteration: "Mangetsu - Ruri no Omoi" (Japanese: 満月 ルリの想い)	April 23, 2002	August 12, 2007
5	"Fight - The Two Water Users"; Transliteration: "Taiketsu - Futari no Mizu Tsukai" (Japanese: 対決 二人の水使い)	April 30, 2002	August 19, 2007
6	"Training and Resolve"; Transliteration: "Shugyō - Sorezore no Ketsui" (Japanese: 修行 それぞれの決意)	May 7, 2002	August 26, 2007
7	"Charge Into the Underground!"; Transliteration: "Totsunyū - Chika Sekai e" (Japanese: 突入 地下世界へ)	May 14, 2002	September 2, 2007
8	"The Traps Hidden in the Darkness"; Transliteration: "Sūpei - Yami ni Hisomu Wana" (Japanese: 師兵 闇に潜む罠)	May 21, 2002	September 9, 2007
9	"The Spirit Gun - To Fight Together"; Transliteration: "Renkijū - Tomo ni Tatakau Tame ni" (Japanese: 錬氣銃 ともに戦うために)	May 28, 2002	September 16, 2007
10	"The Revenge of the Water User"; Transliteration: "Gyakushū - Mizu Tsukai Futatabi..." (Japanese: 逆襲 水使い再び…)	June 4, 2002	September 23, 2007
11	"Fight to the Death - Beyond the Hatred"; Transliteration: "Shitō - Nikushimi o Koete" (Japanese: 死闘 憎しみを越えて)	June 11, 2002	September 30, 2007
12	"The Insubordination - Escape Into The Light"; Transliteration: "Hangyaku - Hikari e no Dasshutsu" (Japanese: 反逆 光への脱出)	June 18, 2002	October 7, 2007
13	"The Promise of the Ribbons"; Transliteration: "Yakusoku - Ribon ni Kometa Omoi" (Japanese: 約束 リボンに込めた想い)	June 25, 2002	October 14, 2007
14	"The Assassins of Tower Gate"; Transliteration: "Tsuigeki - Tawā Gēto no Shikaku" (Japanese: 追撃 タワーゲートの刺客)	July 2, 2002	October 21, 2007
15	"Raid - The Broken Bonds"; Transliteration: "Shūgeki - Hikisakareta Kizuna" (Japanese: 襲撃 引き裂かれた絆)	July 9, 2002	October 28, 2007
16	"The Unforgettable Tragedy"; Transliteration: "Shōgeki - Wasure Enu Senritsu" (Japanese: 衝撃 忘れえぬ旋律)	July 16, 2002	November 4, 2007
17	"Fighting for Her Smile"; Transliteration: "Zengeki - Egao no Tame ni" (Japanese: 漸撃 笑顔のために)	July 23, 2002	November 11, 2007
18	"Wind Blowing Away the Tears"; Transliteration: "Saikai - Namida Nuguu Kaze" (Japanese: 再会 涙ぬぐう風)	July 30, 2002	November 18, 2007
19	"Frustration - Unfulfilled Desire"; Transliteration: "Shōsō - Todokanu Omoi" (Japanese: 焦燥 とどかぬ想い)	August 6, 2002	November 25, 2007
20	"The Trap of the Magnet Users"; Transliteration: "Shikaku - Jiryoku Tsukai no Wana" (Japanese: 刺客 磁力使いのワナ)	August 13, 2002	December 2, 2007
21	"Slums - The Town of Traitors"; Transliteration: "Saikasō - Hangyakusha Tachi no Machi" (Japanese: 最下層 反逆者たちの街)	August 20, 2002	December 9, 2007
22	"Invitation to the Killing Fields"; Transliteration: "Kesshū - Shokei Ba e no Shōtaijō" (Japanese: 結集 処刑場への招待状)	August 27, 2002	December 16, 2007
23	"Battle - Toward the Zenith"; Transliteration: "Gekisen - Chōten o Mezashite" (Japanese: 激戦 頂点をめざして)	September 3, 2002	December 23, 2007
24	"Reason - Treacherous Flame"; Transliteration: "Riyū - Uragiri no Honō" (Japanese: 理由 裏切りの炎)	September 10, 2002	December 30, 2007
25	"Collapse - Tormented Mind"; Transliteration: "Hōkai - Iyasarenu Kokoro" (Japanese: 崩壊 癒されぬ心)	September 17, 2002	January 6, 2008
26	"Toward the Light - United Ambitions"; Transliteration: "Hikari e - Omoi o Hitotsu ni" (Japanese: 光へ 想いをひとつに)	September 24, 2002	January 13, 2008
