= List of Haibane Renmei episodes =

The Haibane Renmei box set released in North America by Geneon.

Haibane Renmei is a Japanese animated television series. It was directed by Tomokazu Tokoro, animated by the Japanese animation studio Radix, and produced by Yasuyuki Ueda. The episodes are based on the brief dōjinshi The Haibane of Old Home (オールドホームの灰羽達, Ōrudo-hōmu no Haibane-tachi) by Yoshitoshi ABe, expanding on the original concepts over thirteen episodes. ABe also wrote the screenplay for the anime. The plot of the episodes follows Rakka, a girl who hatches from a cocoon in a strange town with no memory of who she was before.

The episodes aired from October 10, 2002, to December 19, 2002, on Animax and Fuji Television. The first five ran two weeks apart, and the remaining eight were shown weekly in back-to-back pairs.

Geneon, Haibane Renmei's Japanese distributor, also owned the license for the series' English release in the United States until it was acquired by Funimation in 2010. MVM Films owns distribution rights in the United Kingdom and Madman Entertainment owns them in Australia and New Zealand.

Two pieces of theme music are used for the episodes; one opening theme and one closing theme. The opening theme is "Free Bird" by Kow Otani and the closing theme is "Blue Flow" by Masumi Itō with Heart of Air. The soundtrack album, Hanenone, was released on December 30, 2002, in Japan and August 5, 2003, in the United States.

== Episode list ==
No.	Title	Directed by	Original release date
1	"Cocoon — Dream of Falling from the Sky — Old Home"; Transliteration: "Mayu — sora o ochiru yume — ōrudo hōmu" (Japanese: 繭･空を落ちる夢･オールドホーム)	Tomokazu Tokoro	October 10, 2002
A girl dreams that she is gently falling through the sky and that a crow is trying to save her. Later, she wakes up inside a giant cocoon. Upon breaking out, she is tended to by a group of winged and haloed people who introduce themselves as Haibane. They name her Rakka. Like her, none of them can remember anything before being born from cocoons into this world, and all are named after their own dreams. They give Rakka a newly-forged halo, which slides away from her head and must be temporarily strapped on, then leave for the night. Reki stays behind to help Rakka through the ordeal of growing her wings. After they erupt painfully from her back, Rakka sleeps while Reki cleans the blood from her feathers.
2	"Town and Wall — Touga — Haibane Renmei"; Transliteration: "Machi to kabe — Tōga — Haibane Renmei" (Japanese: 街と壁･トーガ･灰羽連盟)	Itsuki Imazaki	October 24, 2002
Rakka's new companions introduce around Old Home, the previously abandoned dormitory in which they now live in. This place also houses numerous children referred to as the Young Feathers. Rakka is then accompanied by the Haibane, except Reki, into the nearby town of Glie, which is mainly populated by ordinary humans. Rakka learns that certain rules have been set down by an organization called the Haibane Renmei. They are required to work and are only allowed to own secondhand items that humans have stopped using. Because they are also forbidden to use money, they must instead write down their earnings and expenses in special notebooks provided by the organization. The town and local countryside are surrounded by an enormous wall through which only the mysterious traders called Toga can come and go. A masked figure called the Communicator is the one person allowed to speak with them, and then only through sign language. Rakka has an eerie feeling as she looks at the Communicator and at the crows near the walls. When the group returns home at night, Reki waits for an exhausted Rakka and watches her until she falls asleep.
3	"Temple — The Communicator — Pancakes"; Transliteration: "Jiin — Washi — Pankēki" (Japanese: 寺院･話師･パンケーキ)	Hiroshi Kimura	November 7, 2002
Rakka goes to visit Reki, who wakes up on the floor after falling from her bed during a nightmare. From the paints and other materials in the room, Rakka learns that Reki is an artist, although she will not share any of her paintings. Hikari takes Rakka to the temple of the Haibane Renmei, where Rakka meets the Communicator and is approved as a new Haibane. He gives her the notebook with which she can make purchases and encourages her to search for a job. Back at Old Home, Rakka finds Reki dealing with her own job, which is to help cook and care for the Young Feathers. To help convince the children to eat their carrots, Rakka volunteers to go visit the bakery where Hikari works and purchase some pancakes. Kuu, the youngest of the older Haibane, accompanies her and shares her belief that, despite their small wings, each Haibane will one day be able to fly. At the bakery, they discover that Hikari had used the halo mold in a cooking experiment, which explains the effect Rakka's halo has on her hair.
4	"Trash Day — Clock Tower — Birds Flying Over the Walls"; Transliteration: "Gomi no hi — Tokeitō — Kabe o koeru tori" (Japanese: ゴミの日･時計塔･壁を越える鳥)	Jun Takada	November 14, 2002}
Exploring her job options, Rakka spends a day with Kana. This begins early in the morning with taking out the trash and fighting off crows that plague the yard. Rakka suggests setting aside any leftover food the crows might like, but Kana replies that birds are the only creatures that can fly back and forth over the walls of the city, and that if they were to become too comfortable inside, they might never be free again. She then shows Rakka her personal project, a broken-down clock tower on the Old Home campus, and they hurry off to Kana's work place, a much larger clock tower and shop in the center of Glie. Kana's employer is a gruff old man who treats her very strictly but secretly appreciates her and worries that Rakka's presence means Kana will leave soon. After Kana and Rakka clean up a mess left by repair workers, they go out on a balcony which turns out to be the highest point in town, other than the walls. They then return home, and Kana's boss gives her a set of tools with which to repair the Old Home clock tower.
5	"Library — Abandoned Factory — Beginning of the World"; Transliteration: "Toshokan — Haikōjō — Sekai no hajimari" (Japanese: 図書館･廃工場･世界のはじまり)	Kōji Yoshikawa	November 21, 2002
Rakka goes to work with Nemu at the library. There she meets Sumika, a kindly, pregnant librarian who asks for Rakka's perspective on what it was like to be born. Rakka then explores the library books for information about the world outside the walls of Glie. Sumika tells her that she, too, has made such a search and found no answers. At the end of the day, Nemu tells Rakka that she is working on a gift for Sumika involving an old, partially destroyed book they once discovered called "The Beginning of the World." As they walk, they catch sight of Reki and witness an unfriendly encounter between her and a male Haibane named Hyoko. Nemu explains that he comes from another nest, Abandoned Factory, and that he and Reki once ran away together. As a result, they are no longer allowed into each other's territory. The next day, Nemu shares with Rakka the gift she is working on, a rewritten version of "The Beginning of the World" with the gaps in the story filled in. Together, they finish writing it, including a possible origin for Haibane and a bit of Nemu's own sleepy personality.
6	"End of Summer — Rain — Loss"; Transliteration: "Natsu no owari — Ame — Sōshitsu" (Japanese: 夏の終わり･雨･喪失)	Kenichirō Watanabe	November 28, 2002
Rakka searches for a room of her own to move into, but most of Old Home is in disrepair. Kuu gives her a warm coat to prepare for winter, but as she leaves, Rakka is disturbed to see the halo over Kuu's head flickering. Seeing Rakka in her new coat, Kana tells her it was the first item of clothing Kuu bought for herself, despite being too large, and that Kuu has always had a habit of trying to imitate her older companions, often with disastrous results. Returning to her search, Rakka discovers that Kuu has circled a specific room on her map. She goes there and is delighted to feel a sense of familiarity. Kuu, who has been waiting for her, explains that this is the room where Rakka was born. She then thanks Rakka for the influence she has been, and leaves. That night, a rainstorm hits, and Kuu is nowhere to be found. After Rakka sees a light in the Western Woods, Reki says that Kuu may have taken her Day of Flight and passed outside the walls. The Haibane all don raincoats and go to the woods, where they find Kuu's halo, now cold and dim.
7	"Scar — Illness — Arrival of Winter"; Transliteration: "Kizuato — Yamai — Fuyu no tōrai" (Japanese: 傷痕･病･冬の到来)	Itsuki Imazaki	November 28, 2002
Rakka refuses to believe Kuu will never return from her Day of Flight, since it has now been a month since then as winter soon approaches. She goes insides Kuu's room to clean up the place, but she begins to notice sickly black spots begin to appear on her own wings. Depressed, she goes into town alone to get something to eat and later encounters Hyoko. Although he is relieved that Reki was not the one who has disappeared, Rakka becomes upset since she really cares about Kuu. When Rakka returns to Old Home later that day, more black spots start to show, and Reki begins to worry when she catches sight of this. Rakka cries as she runs back to Kuu's room, and Reki follows and embraces her. Reki gives Rakka special medicine extracted from an elderly tree for her wings. Reki explains that a Haibane is deemed to be sin-bound if they have forgotten their dream while inside their cocoon, and, unlike blessed Haibane, will never have their Day of Flight. She also reveals that she was sin-bound when she was a newborn and that she had been haunted by nightmares since then, trying to remember her dream.
8	"The Bird"; Transliteration: "Tori" (Japanese: 鳥)	Takahiro Omori	December 5, 2002
Hikari gives Rakka a pair of wing covers that will protect her from the cold atmosphere, though she uses it just to hide her wings. After Reki helps Rakka move Kuu's bed into her room, Rakka questions her purpose for her existence, to which Reki suggests she must find out on her own. They take the Young Feathers to buy winter clothes. After talking with the store owner, who says that Haibane are said to be good luck, a customer tries to touch Rakka's wings. She flees out of the store, and, as she trip onto the pavement, one of the wing covers comes loose. A man helps her back up and gives her back the wing cover, and she ashamedly runs into the Western Woods, led by the crows, who take her to an old well where she learns about her cocoon dream. Rakka feels both nostalgic and amnesiac of the crow she has seen in this dream.
9	"Water Well — Rebirth — Riddle"; Transliteration: "Ido — Saisei — Nazokake" (Japanese: 井戸･再生･謎掛け)	Jun Takada	December 5, 2002
The Haibane leave Old Home in search for Rakka, who realizes that the crow that died in the well represents someone who cared about her in her old life. The Toga find and rescue her from the well, but they do not know what has happened to Kuu and refuse to speak, much to her dismay. She believes she heard Kuu's voice behind the cold wall, but the Communicator catches her touching it. Now having a sprained ankle, the Communicator leads her home. The Communicator says that the crow had finished its purpose before dying, but Rakka sympathizes for this crow showing what her dream meant. The Communicator also remarks how she is sin-bound due to her black-spotted wings that she tried to hide. He then gives a riddle, which he calls the Circle of Sin, stating that to recognize sin is to have no sin. Rakka wonders that if by saying she has no sin she becomes a sinner. The Communicator notes the paradox and that it might be what it means to be sin-bound. As the Communicator departs, Reki and the others find her. However, Reki realizes that Rakka has touched the wall, feeling her cold body. Rakka becomes ill and Reki takes her home to take care of her. It is hinted that Reki may have been in a similar situation in the past. She laments that she is always alone.
10	"Kuramori — Haibane of Abandoned Factory — Rakka's Job"; Transliteration: "Kuramori — Haikōjō no Haibane tachi — Rakka no shigoto" (Japanese: クラモリ･廃工場の灰羽達･ラッカの仕事)	Kōji Yoshikawa	December 12, 2002
In a flashback, Kuramori and Nemu witnessed Reki being born with black-spotted wings. Kuramori promised Reki that she would stay by her side forever. Kuramori takes Reki to see the Communicator, who gives Reki her name and shows Kuramori how to prepare the special medicine. One day, Kuramori falls ill due to her poor health, and Reki and Nemu cook breakfast for her overnight. The next morning, Kuramori lets Reki live in the guest room to take on the responsibility to take care of any newborn Haibane. In the present, Reki goes to the Communicator to ask for help for the ailing Rakka, so he tells her that Rakka is no longer sin-bound. He also says that Nemu always worries about her. Rakka feels better after Reki gives her the special medicine. As punishment for touching the wall, Rakka is given her own job within the wall around the city, as she is to gather light leaves to make halos and to purify the rusted name tags. Hyoko and Midori offer a tentatively friendly gesture from Abandoned Factory to Old Home. Reki tells Nemu not to think of her as a burden for worrying about her so much.
11	"Parting — Darkness in the Heart — Irreplaceable Thing"; Transliteration: "Betsuri — Kokoro no yami — Kakegae no nai mono" (Japanese: 別離･心の闇･かげがえのないもの)	Masatsugu Arakawa	December 12, 2002
Rakka goes to Abandoned Factory to meet up with Hyoko and Midori there. Midori hints to Rakka that Hyoko almost died because of Reki when the two once ran away together. During her work underground, Rakka hears Kuu's voice as drops of puddles flow down the stream. The Communicator later tells Rakka that while she had the birds to offer her forgiveness, Reki will not accept help from anyone and has little time left. Rakka vows to try to help Reki, already knowing she probably will not ever see her again. Since Nemu is sick, Rakka visits the library, coming across one of the petrified books, which Sumika says that it was turned to stone by some sort of magical force. Rakka becomes upset when Reki views that their moments together will not last forever.
12	"Bell Nuts — Passing of the Year Festival — Reconciliation"; Transliteration: "Suzu no mi — sugikoshi no matsuri — Yūwa" (Japanese: 鈴の実･過ぎ越しの祭･融和)	Wataru Sakaibashi	December 19, 2002
The Haibane go into town to buy bell nuts, gifts of reconciliation for the upcoming Passing of the Year Festival. Reki gives one to Hyoko a week early, saying sorry for dragging her into her personal problems. Hyoko and Midori later reveal that Reki convinced Hyoko to climb over the wall by putting a wedge in it during a downpour in hopes of finding Kuramori on the other side, which led Hyoko to nearly bleed to death. The Communicator tells Rakka that the Day of Flight for a Haibane will come when they realize their true identity. He gives her a wooden tablet containing her true name inside. The Circle of Sin describes that because one cannot forgive themselves for their sin, only someone staying by their side must recognize their sin as well. The Communicator also gives a wooden tablet containing Reki's true name, and Rakka is tasked to give it to her after the festival has passed. During the festival at night, the Haibane, except Reki, visit the people in town, giving them bell nuts as a sign of appreciation. Rakka brings Midori to Old Home to show Reki the yellow fireworks launched by Hyoko from Abandoned Factory, a message of forgiveness to Reki.
13	"Reki's World — Prayer — Epilogue"; Transliteration: "Reki no sekai — Inori — Shūshō" (Japanese: レキの世界･祈り･終章)	Kenichirō Watanabe	December 19, 2002
Rakka discovers that Reki's entire studio is painted like her cocoon dream. Rakka gives Reki the wooden tablet containing her true name, which fills the latter with despair. She has regretted ever being born in this world seven years ago, exiling herself from others and showing no trust in them. She wanted to always be there for Rakka in order to finally find salvation for herself. She throws Rakka out of her studio, confronts a crumbling stone manifestation of herself, and relives her dream. Rakka finds out the truth about the struggle Reki is going through via her diary, realizing that Reki wanted to protect her all along. Rakka goes back inside the studio, but is stopped by the manifestation. After Reki calls out for Rakka, the manifestation disappears. She saves Reki from being hit by a foggy image of a train. Reki departs on her Day of Flight, something all the Haibane will never forget. As spring nears, Rakka sees two cocoons beginning to sprout out of the ground inside a room.

== Volume DVDs ==
=== Japanese releases ===
In Japan, Geneon released a total of 5 DVD compilations of Haibane Renmei between December 21, 2002, and April 25, 2003. Instead of being called "discs," these releases were labelled "COG.1," "COG.2", etc. A complete three-disc boxed set was released on November 21, 2004.

Japanese releases
Volume	Released	Discs	Episodes
1	December 21, 2002	1	1
2	January 24, 2003	1	3
3	February 21, 2003	1	3
4	March 21, 2003	1	3
5	April 25, 2003	1	3
Box set	March 21, 2007	3	13

=== North American releases ===
In the United States, Geneon released 4 DVD compilations of Haibane Renmei, each with its own title, between August 26, 2003, and February 24, 2004. The first disc was available either on its own or with a storage box for the series; the four discs were released together as a box set on November 21, 2004. In 2012, Funimation re-released the series in a 2-disc set under their Anime Classics label.

North American releases
Volume	Title	Released	Discs	Episodes
1	"New Feathers"	August 26, 2003	1	4
2	"Wings of Sorrow"	October 28, 2003	1	3
3	"Free Bird"	December 14, 2003	1	3
4	"Day of Flight"	February 24, 2004	1	3
Box set		October 18, 2005	4	13
Anime Classics Set		September 4, 2012	2	13
