= Los Peques =

Argentinian 3D animation television series

Los Peques is a 3D animation television series made in Argentina that tells the experiences of some trolls in the Argentine Patagonia.

Created in 2001 in the Province of Neuquén, and disseminated through Cable Visión del Comahue, the series is characterized by scripts with a great sense of humor and wit, with a clear message in favor of values such as friendship, work, respect for the elderly and the roots, as well as a strong ecological content. With episodes of short duration, just 5 minutes, appeared on television for a while, at a rate of 4 daily departures, and due to the great acceptance that was on the part of the public, many other products emerged, including DVD movies. In 2012 the creation of new episodes was announced; these will be broadcast by the Pakapaka channel, belonging to the Ministry of Education.

== Plot ==
The Peques live somewhere in the Andean Patagonian mountain range of Neuquén, in houses called peque rukas, which are a kind of arboreal hut and are built with materials that Mother Nature gives them. They have an organization, the Armies of the Mapu, 4 that have nothing to do with wars, but with the care of nature. When young people enter what is known as the smallness of the turkey they are sent to watch distant areas so that they do not falter.

== Characters ==
- Chicho. Patrol leader. It is, along with Nino, one of the two protagonists of the strip. He is a supporter of River. Nino's roommate and apparently treated as brothers. Give good advice. Live worried about nature and others.
- Nino. The smallest of all. It is, along with Chicho, one of the two protagonists of the strip. Live with Chicho and is perhaps the most loved by the followers of the series. He is naive, capricious and optimistic, he has a doll named Captain Coscacho. Pronounce the eses as Z. He is a supporter of Boca.
- Tina. She is the only older girl in the series. Chicho is in love with this little girl, but she ignores him. Tina is very intelligent and is a supporter of the Velez club.
- The Tucu. He is a desert goblin, he lives alone, he is happy, frank, smiling and crazy. Its main characteristic is the continuous hyperactivity that alters the peace of those around it. He loves jokes, he plays Maradona football according to everyone. He is a supporter of Estudiantes de La Plata.
- Fito. The genius inventor. It manufactures machines, like a vehicle with 4 wheels with candle, that inaugurates a day without wind. He is a fan of Independiente.
- Hans. He is a little boy who came from Germany to Patagonia for a cultural exchange and decided to stay. He does not master Spanish very much. He is a supporter of FC Bayern Munich.
- Nono. The old man from the community. In charge of guiding the youngsters, however, (comically) he never remembers the names of the other children and often ignores them completely and usually appears as a madman. He is Racing sympathizer.
- Coco. The strongman of the community. Almost nothing is known about him. He is the one who appears least. He loves eat. He is a supporter of the San Lorenzo de Almagro Club.

== Episodes ==
Episodes: There are more episodes than those. 1) Small meeting 1 2) Small meeting 2 3) Small meeting 3 4) Small evolution 1 5) Small evolution 2 6) Little Pearls 1 7) Small animals 8) Small army 9) Third Smallness 10) Little Moons 11) The Littleness of Turkey 12) Little Pearls 2 13) Pequeguardianes 14) Small culture 15) Little Pearls 3 16) Small convictions 17) Small communication 1 18) Small communication 2 19) Small science 20) Little Pearls 4 21) Extras Momentontos 22) Pequerescate 23) Pequedeportes

== Awards and honours ==
- 2003: ATVC.5 Award
- 2004: Martin Fierro Prize to the best unitary program of the television of the interior of the country.
- 2004: Declared of cultural interest by the Chamber of Deputies of the Argentine Nation.
- 2005: FundTV Award - best program in the field of children.7
- 2005: Andreani Foundation Special Award.7
- 2006: FundTV Award - best program for children.
- 2007: Nomination for the best children's program.9
- 2007: Prix Jeunesse Iberoamericano in Chile
- 12th Mostra Lleida of Latin American Cinema. 2nd prize in the category of 6 to 11 years, fiction.10
- UNICEF Award
- ATVC Award: General Interest Special category.
- ATVC Award: Gold Jury Award as best children's program.
- Expo Productiva 2009 Award - Marcos Juárez (Córdoba): Honorable Mention to Christian Olmos, by virtue of being an artist of excellence, a generator of examples in pursuit of the defense of the environment and good relations, and a human being who With his sensitivity he has transcended our borders.
