= List of Full Moon o Sagashite episodes =

This is a list of episodes for the Japanese anime television series Full Moon o Sagashite. The series is an adaptation of the manga Full Moon Wo Sagashite by Arina Tanemura. It was produced by Studio Deen and directed by Toshiyuki Kato. It was broadcast in 52 episodes on TV Tokyo from April 6, 2002, to March 29, 2003. The adaption follows the manga closely until Mitsuki's first audition as a singer, before diverging. Several characters have different histories and personalities, and the television series concluded before the manga did, with a different resolution.

The television series is licensed by Viz Media, who released the first 28 episodes on seven DVDs under the title Full Moon (although the full title appears on the cover) as of December 2007. The songs are subtitled only, resulting in a dub that switches between English dialogue and Japanese singing. The series is also available on Hulu, which has begun to show episodes beyond the DVD release.

== Episodes ==
Note: This list uses Viz's official English-translated titles through episode 28, unofficial Japanese translations thereafter.

No.	Title	Directed by	Written by	Original air date
1	"I Want To Sing!"; Transliteration: "Soredemo utaitai" (Japanese: それでも歌いたい)	Akira Shimizu	Hiro Masaki	April 6, 2002
12-year-old girl Mitsuki Kouyama dreams of becoming a famous singer and of reuniting with her beloved childhood friend, Eichi Sakurai. However, she has sarcoma, a tumor in her throat. Surgery is needed to save her life, but the treatment could also cause her to lose her singing voice, so she refuses to have it. Her grandmother, who is her guardian, also hates music. Mitsuki secretly passes an audition at Seed Records, but her doctor Keiichi Wakaoji refuses to take her there as he is concerned it would make her worse. A pair of shinigami, Takuto Kira and Meroko Yui, emerge from Mitsuki's wall, arguing and not realizing that Mitsuki can "see" them. They are surprised, but introduce themselves and explain that Mitsuki only has 1 year left to live. Mitsuki sneaks out of the house, determined to go to the audience so she can achieve her goal before dying, but she begins coughing and nearly collapses. Respecting her love of music, Takuto uses his powers to transform her into a yellow-haired, healthy 16-year-old girl who can sing without any pain. She takes the audition and, without question, the directors choose her!
2	"My Promise to Eichi"; Transliteration: "Eichi-kun to no yakusoku" (Japanese: 英知くんとの約束)	Yutaka Hirata	Hiro Masaki	April 13, 2002
Meroko and Takuto argue about letting Mitsuki audition. In which, both are forced to help so Mitsuki can pass on without regrets. Mitsuki talks about why she wants to become a singer. The shinigami find out about Eichi, and then Takuto and Meroko switch sides of the argument. Takuto thinks that it is an immoral reason to sing, gets angry at her, and flies off. Meroko reads Mitsuki's fortune and says that it will be her lucky day. Meroko and Mitsuki go shopping, and then Meroko pretends to be Eichi. In the end, Mitsuki tells Takuto that she really does love to sing and it's not just for Eichi, and the two make up. Takuto gives Mitsuki a whistle.
3	"Along Came the Manager"; Transliteration: "Manējā-san ga kita" (Japanese: マネージャーさんが来た)	Masami Furukawa	Ryō Tamura	April 20, 2002
After a day of school, Mitsuki gets a call from Dr. Wakaoji. He explains that Mitsuki's new manager Masami Oshige wants to meet her at the hospital. However, Mitsuki will have to be in her 16-year-old form in front of the manager, and she'll have to be in her regular 12-year-old form in front of Dr. Wakaoji, with them both in the same room. Since telling the truth isn't an option, Meroko takes it upon herself to solve the problem. In the end, Mitsuki and the shinigami manage to trick them.
4	"Thoughts On a Song"; Transliteration: "Uta ni kometa omoi" (Japanese: 詞にこめた想い)	Mihiro Yamaguchi	Rika Nakase	April 27, 2002
Mitsuki's debut CD is already being discussed by her producer, Mr. Takasu and her manager. Takasu wants her to sing a pre-written song for her debut, but Mitsuki wants to sing a song with her own feelings in it. Takasu agrees to give Mitsuki three days to write her own song. But, Takasu doesn't believe that she can do it because she is a novice. He talked with Ms. Oshige and told her that they would let Mitsuki sing the pre-written one. In the end, Takasu accepted Mitsuki's song. Mitsuki's 16-year-old self now goes by the stagename: "Fullmoon".
5	"Her First Assignment"; Transliteration: "Hajimete no oshigoto" (Japanese: はじめてのお仕事)	Akira Shimizu	Genki Yoshimura	May 4, 2002
Mitsuki's first job at a lake for photo-shooting and evaluation starts out rough because she worries about whether or not she's acting sixteen rather than twelve. But, after talking to three high school girls, she manages to get through the day, now reassured.
6	"A Long Day in the Studio"; Transliteration: "Sutajio no nagai hi" (Japanese: スタジオの長い日)	Tsuyoshi Yoshimoto	Ryō Tamura	May 11, 2002
Mitsuki and Takuto (pretending to be a cat plushie) go to the studio to do a recording while Meroko stays at home, posing as Mitsuki. When Mitsuki gets in the room she puts Takuto down on the couch. While Mitsuki learns what to do in a recording booth, a little girl named Nanami sneaks in and takes sleeping Takuto away. During the break, Mitsuki goes looking for the missing Takuto, so she blows the whistle he gave her to call him. When Mitsuki finds them, Nanami refuses to give Takuto back. Nanami lies and says that she doesn't have parents so she can keep Takuto (earlier he tried to escape but couldn't let him so she started to cry and he came to Nanami out of pity). Then Nanami goes to a store with Mitsuki following and tells Mitsuki that her parents are employees there. Mitsuki still doesn't believe it so she says something to Namami, and Nanami's parents hold her. In the end, Nanami gives Takuto back to Mitsuki and Nanami becomes Fullmoon's no. 1 fan.
7	"Full Moon Debuts!"; Transliteration: "Furu mūn, debyū!" (Japanese: フルムーン、デビュー！)	Masami Furukawa	Hiro Masaki	May 18, 2002
It's time for Fullmoon's first live performance! But when a girl from the audition in episode 1, questions Mitsuki's abilities as a singer, Mitsuki begins to doubt herself. But she was able to cope. In her performance, both her manager and producer were amazed by her due to the special effects they thought one of them did, but it was really Takuto.
8	"Is It Really A Hit?"; Transliteration: "Hitto tte hontō?" (Japanese: ヒットって本当？)	Oyunam	Rika Nakase	May 25, 2002
Fullmoon's debut maxi single, "MYSELF", is now on sale. The good news is that it's a smash hit. The bad news is that no one at Mitsuki's school seems to be talking about the CD. Mitsuki doesn't know what to do because she has no friends. Mitsuki loses confidence when she overhears a girl from her school talking bad about Fullmoon's song. But Meroko was able to think of a solution to advertise the CD and Mitsuki gained friends. Her new friends also found out about Mitsuki's talent for singing. In the end, the girl she thought talking bad to her song meant she couldn't find a place to buy it.
9	"I Want You to Hear It!"; Transliteration: "Kiite hoshī no ni" (Japanese: 聞いてほしいのに)	Akira Shimizu	Genki Yoshimura	June 1, 2002
Mitsuki discovers that Dr. Wakaoji has not listened to "MYSELF", and she really wants him to hear it, but Dr. Wakaoji refuses to listen to the song. Though Mitsuki follows Wakaoji and finds him at her late parents' tombstone, responding that he will stop "running away". In the end, Mitsuki discovered that Wakaoji had brought a CD of her album. She was really happy.
10	"The Rules of Show Business?!"; Transliteration: "Geinōkai no okite!?" (Japanese: 芸能界の掟！？)	Naoyuki Itō	Kōhei Urasawa	June 8, 2002
Mitsuki gets to debut on TV on a show starring Fuyuko Komaki. However, Komaki doesn't seem to like Mitsuki very much due to a series of misunderstandings. In the end, Komaki doesn't dislike her anymore.
11	"The Dangerous Lens"; Transliteration: "Kiken na renzu" (Japanese: 危険なレンズ)	Teruo Satō	Ryō Tamura	June 15, 2002
There is a photographer named Saegusa who has a reputation for exposing celebrities' secrets with his pictures. His next target: Fullmoon. In Meroko's shinigami booklet, the word "Lens" appears backward which means that Mitsuki's death can be brought forward so she could die sooner than a year. It's up to Takuto now to protect Mitsuki since Meroko had to stay home to pose as Mitsuki. In the end, Takuto spooks him so much, that Saegusa quits his job and leaves the town.
12	"Green Onion Ramen and the Saint's Stone"; Transliteration: "Negi rāmen to seija no ishi" (Japanese: ねぎラーメンと聖者の石)	Tsuyoshi Yoshimoto	Hiro Masaki	June 22, 2002
Takuto gets mad at Mitsuki for drawing a terrible picture of him. He flies off and Meroko follows. Meanwhile, an old man collapses in front of the house, and Ms. Tanaka takes him in. As a show of gratitude, the old man gives Tanaka the Saint's Stone, a big rock that has the power to expel shinigami. So naturally, the stone prevents Takuto and Meroko from getting into contact with Mitsuki, which is bad because she has a job to do later.
13	"A Mini Concert"; Transliteration: "Chitchana konsāto" (Japanese: ちっちゃなコンサート)	Akira Shimizu	Rika Nakase	June 29, 2002
Mitsuki holds a Fullmoon mini-concert at the Hiiragi Preschool. All the kids love her except for this one mean little boy, Taiki, who looks very similar to Eichi. As the day goes on, Taiki does a lot of bad things to Mitsuki from stepping on her foot to stealing her stage costume to wrecking the entire concert. Despite all that has happened, Mitsuki still feels that Taiki did all this for a good reason.
14	"Do Your Best, Substitute Manager!"; Transliteration: "Ganbare! Dairi manējā" (Japanese: がんばれ！代理マネージャー)	Tarō Iwasaki	Kōhei Urasawa	July 6, 2002
Ms. Oshige is sick in the hospital, and Mitsuki is forced to make do with her clumsy substitute manager, Kotarou Akiba. In the meantime, Takuto and Meroko are at a conference in the spirit world.
15	"Her First Kiss!?"; Transliteration: "Fāsuto kisu!?" (Japanese: ファースト・キス！？)	Shunji Yoshida	Genki Yoshimura	July 13, 2002
It's summertime, and Mitsuki gets a job by the beach. When Mitsuki gets harassed by three boys, an attractive young man named Murakami saves and befriends her. However, Takuto is suspicious of Murakami.
16	"The Rival Appears!"; Transliteration: "Raibaru tōjō!" (Japanese: ライバル登場！)	Fumihiro Ueno	Hiro Masaki	July 20, 2002
Mitsuki gets an audition for a shampoo commercial. It's Meroko's turn to go out with Mitsuki while Takuto stays home. Unfortunately, Meroko gets her lost when finding the site for the audition. What's worse is that the girl from the first episode's audition, Madoka Wakamatsu, has returned—and she's willing to do anything to stop Mitsuki from winning the audition.
17	"Takuto and Mitsuki's Disagreement"; Transliteration: "Surechigau futari" (Japanese: すれ違う二人)	Akira Shimizu	Rika Nakase	July 27, 2002
The judges agree to have a camera test for both Fullmoon and Madoka at the Mermaid Tear Image Character Audition, then select the best one for the job based on the test. Takuto flies off after Mitsuki asks him about his past, and Meroko soon follows claiming that remembering their lives is forbidden to shinigami. Madoka gets opportunities to further her chances of winning the audition. Mitsuki uses the whistle to call Takuto but ends up collapsing and going to the hospital. The next day, she leaves the hospital despite being sick, losing her whistle on the way.
18	"Run to the Audition!"; Transliteration: "Hashire! Ōdishon e!" (Japanese: 走れ! オーディションへ!)	Tsuyoshi Yoshimoto	Rika Nakase	August 3, 2002
In Meroko's Shinigami handbook, the word, "Audition", appeared backward on a page, meaning that the upcoming audition will cause an early death. Ignoring Meroko's commands, Takuto is desperate to help Mitsuki and goes to find her. Mitsuki has collapsed in the middle of the road. Takuto heard Mitsuki's singing, to wake her up, however, Takuto must do the mouth-to-mouth procedure on Mitsuki. Transforms her into Fullmoon, and runs for the commercial audition. However, Meroko tries to stop Mitsuki and Takuto from making it to the audition.
19	"A Singer's Voice That Can't Be Heard"; Transliteration: "Todokanai utagoe" (Japanese: 届かない歌声)	Yoshinari Suzuki	Ryō Tamura	August 10, 2002
Mitsuki has arrived at the Mermaid Tear Image Character Audition, only to find out that she is late and Madoka has won by default. Things get even worse when Ms. Oshige and Dr. Wakaoji catch up with Mitsuki. It seems Oshige is looking for the 16-year-old "Fullmoon" Mitsuki, and Wakaoji is searching for the 12-year-old Mitsuki. She and Takuto run away from the two. Mitsuki now in a predicament on the verge of Oshige and Wakaoji will discover that both Fullmoon and Mitsuki are the same person; how she can't go back to them or be Fullmoon anymore. Meanwhile, the rumors that Fullmoon has quit the business flood the media. The next early morning, having slept near the ocean, Mitsuki listened to Takuto's singing. She decides to tell Ms. Oshige and Wakaoji the truth about Takuto and her identity.
20	"Meroko, All Alone"; Transliteration: "Meroko, hitoribotchi" (Japanese: めろこ、ひとりぼっち)	Akira Shimizu	Hiro Masaki	August 17, 2002
Despite being scolded by her grandmother, and telling Ms. Oshige and Dr. Wakaoji the knowledge of what has happened to her, everything seems to be back to normal for Mitsuki—except for the absent Meroko, who is feeling guilty about causing Mitsuki to miss the audition. Mitsuki invites friends over for a night party, hoping to have Takuto and Meroko reconcile.
21	"A New Inspiration"; Transliteration: "Arata na omoi" (Japanese: 新たな思い)	Oyunam	Genki Yoshimura	August 24, 2002
Fullmoon is back, and she's going to appear on a TV music program. Despite all the gossip about Eichi, she's not going to be held back. That is, until Madoka decides to do something about it. But, Mitsuki manages somehow.
22	"A Solo Performance—Live!"; Transliteration: "Wakuwaku! Soro raibu" (Japanese: ワクワク！ソロライブ)	Akira Shimizu	Rika Nakase	August 31, 2002
Plans are finally made for Fullmoon's first solo live concert! So Mitsuki works all day on the preparations until she's completely exhausted. Everything goes well, until the site cancels at the last minute (because of Madoka), leaving the concert without a site the day before. Mitsuki won't give up knowing Eichi would want her to sing anywhere.
23	"Moving Panic"; Transliteration: "Ohikkoshi panikku" (Japanese: お引っ越しパニック)	Fumihiro Ueno	Ryō Tamura	September 7, 2002
Ms. Oshige decides to live in an apartment that's close to Mitsuki's home. She calls Mitsuki, Takuto, Meroko, and Dr. Wakaoji over to help her move in. But, when Ms. Tanaka sees Wakaoji and Oshige together, she takes it the wrong way and thinks that Oshige is Wakaoji's fiancée, so Tanaka challenges Oshige to see who is more suited to being Dr. Wakaoji's wife.
24	"My Father's Song"; Transliteration: "Otōsan no uta" (Japanese: お父さんの歌)	Yoshinari Suzuki	Kōhei Urasawa	September 14, 2002
Mitsuki's second single will be "ETERNAL SNOW," a secret song by the legendary band, ROUTE:L, and written by Mitsuki's father, Aoi. Coincidentally, Madoka chooses to debut as a singer with that very song, and intentionally picks Takasu as her producer, so he can't help Fullmoon's next song because of that. Then Mitsuki and Oshige thought of requesting Wakaoji since he was in the same band.
25	"Please Dr. Wakaoji"; Transliteration: "Wakaōji sensei ni onegai" (Japanese: 若王子先生にお願い)	Tsuyoshi Yoshimoto	Hiro Masaki	September 21, 2002
With Takasu producing Madoka's song and no other producer in the business willing to go against him, Mitsuki and Ms. Oshige approach Dr. Wakaoji and ask him to produce Mitsuki's second single. However, Dr. Wakaoji refuses despite their begging. Until he feels regretful for not helping his old friend Aoi's daughter. Finally, Wakaoji chooses to be Fullmoon's producer, regarding to preserve her life.
26	"My Message"; Transliteration: "Tsutaetai mono..." (Japanese: 伝えたいもの・・・)	Teruo Satō	Hiro Masaki	September 28, 2002
Wakaoji tells Mitsuki to think about what kind of message she wants to send when she's going to sing "ETERNAL SNOW". So, Mitsuki, Takuto, and Meroko rummage through the Koyama family's old belongings to see what kind of message Mitsuki's father wants to send. She finds her mother's old music box. Mitsuki's grandmother nearly saw her transformation, which reminds her of Hazuki.
27	"I Won't Lose"; Transliteration: "Zettai ni makenai" (Japanese: 絶対に負けない)	Akira Shimizu	Genki Yoshimura	October 5, 2002
Fearing that she may lose to Fullmoon, Madoka gets a reporter to take a photo of Fullmoon and Wakaoji together. This starts a scandal about Fullmoon and Wakaoji having a secret date. However, in the end, Wakaoji has Fullmoon in a recording booth where she sings without any hesitation: "ETERNAL SNOW". Madoka is left depressed after Takasu lectures her.
28	"Is Mitsuki an Expert On Love?"; Transliteration: "Mitsuki tte koi no tatsujin?" (Japanese: 満月って恋の達人？)	Kenichirō Watanabe	Hiro Masaki	October 12, 2002
Mitsuki gets a fan-mail from a girl asking for her advice in love. Mitsuki soon realizes that the mail is actually from her school friend, Kumi. Apparently, she has a crush on a boy named Machida, but she's clueless about how to let him know about her love for him. [This is the final episode of Viz Media's DVD release.]
29	"The New Reapers, Izumi and Jonathan"; Transliteration: "Arat ana shinigami Izumi & Jonasan" (Japanese: 新たな死神・いずみ&ジョナサン)	Yoshinari Suzuki	Rika Nakase	October 19, 2002
While Mitsuki and Takuto are out at a concert, Meroko, who has stayed behind at the house, gets some unexpected visitors: her ex-partner, Izumi Rio, and his partner, Jonathan. By order of the chief, they have come to investigate if the rumor about Meroko and Takuto using their powers to help a human child is true. When Izumi and Jonathan decide to check out Fullmoon's release of her second single, Takuto and Meroko have to keep them from knowing that they are helping Mitsuki.
30	"Someone Who Might Know Where Eichi Is"; Transliteration: "Eichi-kun o shiru hito" (Japanese: 英知くんを知る人)	Teruo Satō	Ryō Tamura	October 26, 2002
Mitsuki's old teacher from the orphanage visits her. She reveals that she now lives in America and agrees to look for Eichi there. Mitsuki tries to write a letter for Kazumi to deliver to Eichi.
31	"It's the Fall of School Festivals"; Transliteration: "Gakuensai no aki nan desu" (Japanese: 学園祭の秋なんです)	Akira Shimizu	Kōhei Urasawa	November 2, 2002
It's not all fun and games at this year's college festival. Takuto transforms into a human to protect Mitsuki from some muscle-bound fanboys, and ends up as a contestant in a game where the prize is a kiss from Fullmoon!
32	"The Real Madoka"; Transliteration: "Sugao no Madoka" (Japanese: 素顔の円)	Oyunam	Genki Yoshimura	November 9, 2002
Things haven't been going well for Madoka after she lost to Fullmoon; she got a new manager, she has lame jobs like cheap commercials, and people are talking behind her back. Mitsuki later finds herself in Madoka's home, where she discovers a little more about her. She convinces Madoka that anyone's songs can be wonderful.
33	"The Creeping Disease"; Transliteration: "Shinobiyoru byōma" (Japanese: 忍びよる病魔)	Yoshinari Suzuki	Hiro Masaki	November 16, 2002
Mitsuki's illness begins to worsen and can't go to Kyoto for her school trip, and Mitsuki's grandmother begins pressuring her to have surgery.
34	"The Gentleman On the Swing"; Transliteration: "Buranko no ojisan" (Japanese: ブランコのおじさん)	Akira Shimizu	Rika Nakase	November 23, 2002
Mitsuki meets a middle-aged man named Sanada. He is able to see shinigami like Takuto and Meroko and his death day is approaching as well! Sanada tells them his sad story about losing his family. Mitsuki and Sanada develop a grandfather-granddaughter relationship. It turns out Izumi and Jonathan knew about Mitsuki.
35	"An E-mail from Eichi?!"; Transliteration: "Eichi-kun kara no mēru!?" (Japanese: 英知くんからのメール！？)	Teruo Satō	Rika Nakase	November 30, 2002
Mitsuki is haunted by images from a dream she had about Izumi trying to take her soul, but she soon cheers up when an (fake) e-mail from Eichi arrives. They receive wonderful news that America may have the cure for Mitsuki's voice.
36	"The Fateful Best New Singer Award"; Transliteration: "Unmei no shinjinshō" (Japanese: 運命の新人賞)	Hong Heon-pyo	Mayu Sugiura	December 7, 2002
Fullmoon has been nominated for the Fantasia Music Festival's New Artist of the Year Award! While she prepares, Takuto and Meroko contemplate on whether or not they should tell Mitsuki the truth about the e-mail from Eichi.
37	"A Present from Full Moon"; Transliteration: "Furu mūn kara no okurimono" (Japanese: 満月(フルムーン)からの贈り物)	Yoshinari Suzuki	Ryō Tamura	December 14, 2002
Christmas time is near, and Mitsuki is inviting her friends to a party at Oshige's apartment. She is also giving out presents. Meroko decides to knit a muffler for Takuto as a present. Madoka's debut CD is finally released on Christmas Eve. Kumi and Machida confess their feelings and vice versa.
38	"Grandma's Past"; Transliteration: "Obāchan no kako" (Japanese: おばあちゃんの過去)	Akira Shimizu	Genki Yoshimura	December 21, 2002
Mitsuki's grandmother refuses to give her permission to go to America, even after Wakaoji tells her that there is a doctor in America who can perform surgery to cure Mitsuki's cancer and still save her voice. Mitsuki learns about her grandmother's past from an old friend, how she used to love playing the piano, but when her ex-fiancé abandoned her, and her daughter (Mitsuki's mother) ran away and died, she blamed music for it all. Mitsuki decides to go to America on her own accord.
39	"Crossing the Pacific"; Transliteration: "Taiheiyō o koete" (Japanese: 太平洋を越えて)	Jun Takahashi	Hiro Masaki	December 28, 2002
Mitsuki and the gang are now in America, and they are currently staying at Kazumi-sensei's home. Takuto becomes unsure of his feelings towards Mitsuki's upcoming meeting with Eichi.
40	"The Stolen Pendant"; Transliteration: "Nusumareta pendanto" (Japanese: 盗まれたペンダント)	Shinichi Shōji	Kōhei Urasawa	January 4, 2003
While sightseeing, Mitsuki loses her pendant to a group of pickpocketers. Mitsuki and Takuto stayed behind to search for her pendant. Takuto reveals his true feelings for Mitsuki.
41	"To The Town Where Eichi Is"; Transliteration: "Eichi-kun no iru machi e" (Japanese: 英知くんのいる街へ)	Teruo Satō	Rika Nakase	January 11, 2003
As Mitsuki and the gang get closer to Eichi's country home, she is confused about Takuto's confession. Suddenly, Meroko notices the name "Eichi Sakurai" has appeared backward in her Shinigami handbook! When Takuto goes to investigate Eichi at his house he senses the stench of death and discovers something tragic.
42	"Eternal Snow"; Transliteration: "Etānaru sunō" (Japanese: エターナル スノー)	Akira Shimizu	Genki Yoshimura	January 18, 2003
Eichi is dead! Takuto tries his best to stop Mitsuki from going to Eichi's house, but Mitsuki goes anyway and finds out from Eichi's adoptive grandparents that he and his adoptive parents died in a car accident 2 years ago. Mitsuki then runs to a cemetery reading a letter written by Eichi before his death and lies on Eichi's gravestone.
43	"I'll Never Sing Again..."; Transliteration: "Mō nido to utawanai..." (Japanese: もう二度と歌わない･･･)	Yoshinari Suzuki	Mayu Sugiura	January 25, 2003
Mitsuki becomes extremely heartbroken when returning from America, and has given up singing. Takuto and Meroko have a hard time watching Mitsuki's pain and try to comfort her but to no avail. Mitsuki's grandmother begins to worry and takes her to different doctors after leaving Dr. Wakaoji's hospital. Ms. Oshige convinces the staff to let Mitsuki take time off because she can't transform into Fullmoon in her condition. She tells Wakaoji how much she wants to support Mitsuki. Izumi advises Takuto and Meroko to take Mitsuki's life now before her pain gets any worse.
44	"Resonating Hearts"; Transliteration: "Kyōmei suru kokoro" (Japanese: 共鳴する心)	Hong Heon-pyo	Genki Yoshimura	February 1, 2003
Madoka searches for Fullmoon and locates Mitsuki's house. Mitsuki's illness grows worse, and she is taken straight to Wakaoji's hospital. Madoka explains to Mitsuki's grandmother how Mitsuki taught her the spirit of singing. While sulking over Eichi's death, Takuto recovers his memories from when he was a human. Meroko turns to Izumi to do something with Mitsuki so that she doesn't have to feel any more pain.
45	"Izumi's Enticing Offer"; Transliteration: "Izumi no yūwaku" (Japanese: いずみの誘惑)	Teruo Satō	Rika Nakase	February 8, 2003
Izumi lures Mitsuki to the hospital roof, promising to take her where Eichi and her family are, while in reality planning to take her soul. Mitsuki's grandmother catches her begging her to stay by her side. Takuto reminiscences his memories from when he was a human. He was a singer of the legendary band ROUTE:L with Mitsuki's parents; Aoi and Hazuki, and Wakaoji.
46	"On the Night of the New Moon"; Transliteration: "Shingetsu no yoru ni" (Japanese: 新月の夜に)	Akira Shimizu	Ryō Tamura	February 15, 2003
Although Mitsuki is temporarily saved from death, she still feels the pain of Eichi's death and is hesitant to sing. Takuto relates his past to Mitsuki in an attempt to make her realize how important living is, and keeps singing the song "ETERNAL SNOW". He almost turns into a ghost to remember his past, despite Meroko's begging. Mitsuki finally recovers from her pain by singing and realizing that Eichi and her parents would want her to live on. Her grandmother finally hears Mitsuki sing and promises to always protect her.
47	"Desire to Live"; Transliteration: "Ikiru kibō" (Japanese: 生きる希望)	Yoshinari Suzuki	Kōhei Urasawa	February 22, 2003
Fullmoon has returned at last. Although Mitsuki's life seems to be back on track, she is unable to forget the fact that she is scheduled to die soon. After Wakaoji and Takuto have a reunion discussion together, they agree to prevent Mitsuki from dying.
48	"She Can't Turn into Full Moon!?"; Transliteration: "Furu mūn ni narenai!?" (Japanese: フルムーンになれない!?)	Shinichi Shōji	Hiro Masaki	March 1, 2003
Mitsuki makes final plans: to set up her biggest live concert called L.I.V.E, on the anniversary of her meeting with Takuto and Meroko (when her lifetime is up), and she will head straight for Wakaoji's hospital to take the surgery before midnight. However, Takuto's power weakens, which makes him unable to turn Mitsuki into Fullmoon. Worried, Mitsuki goes to Izumi for help.
49	"Mitsuki's Feelings – Meroko's Feelings"; Transliteration: "Mitsuki no omoi Meroko no omoi" (Japanese: 満月の思い・めろこの思い)	Teruo Satō	Mayu Sugiura	March 8, 2003
Izumi tells Mitsuki and Meroko about a way to prevent Takuto from becoming a ghost: a mystic lily known as the Flower of Forgetfulness, which its accessible on the Lunar eclipse in the spirit world. If Takuto ingests the flower, he will forget his human memories, which will stop his impending disappearance. However, the flower will not only his human memories but all of his memories as a Shinigami as well, including his time with Mitsuki and Meroko. Meroko manages to retrieve the flower just in time.
50	"I Just Can't Tell Him"; Transliteration: "Dōshitemo ienai" (Japanese: どうしても言えない)	Akira Shimizu	Ryō Tamura	March 15, 2003
Mitsuki hesitates to tell Takuto about the Flower of Forgetfulness. Takuto confesses his love for Mitsuki, and Mitsuki wrestles with her feelings for Takuto and Eichi. In the end, Meroko helps Mitsuki decide that she loves them both. Mitsuki tells Takuto about the flower and admits she loves him as well. They kiss, and Takuto takes the flower.
51	"Day of Destiny"; Transliteration: "Unmei no hi" (Japanese: 運命の日)	Yoshinari Suzuki	Genki Yoshimura	March 22, 2003
It's not only the day of Fullmoon's L.I.V.E concert, but it is also the day Mitsuki is fated to die. With the Flower of Forgetfulness working its magic, Takuto's powers should be returning, but he is still unable to transform Mitsuki, so Meroko decides to share some of her own physical power with him. Fullmoon is back on stage one last time.
52	"Looking for Full Moon"; Transliteration: "Furu mūn o sagashite" (Japanese: 満月(フルムーン)をさがして)	Toshiyuki Katō	Rika Nakase	March 29, 2003
Near the end of the concert, Fullmoon announces to the audience that she will be taking a temporary leave; Oshige tells Madoka and the staff about her foretold death. During the last song "LOVE CHRONICLE", Takuto and Meroko disappear, the Death Master professes that they will be punished for their actions, and Mitsuki will die. Meroko and Takuto beg to have Mitsuki's life saved. Meroko even offers to become a ghost. Seeing the willpower between the two, the Death Master makes Meroko an angel for showing true kindness and Takuto becomes human again, having another chance. Meanwhile, Mitsuki almost changes back to her formal self. Izumi actually helps maintain Mitsuki's last transformation in the end. Mitsuki proceeds to take the surgery and luckily, she is able to keep her voice, having dreamt about Eichi, Takuto, and Meroko. But she can no longer see the shinigami. Sometime later, she meets the angel Meroko, who shows her the way to the human Takuto. Mitsuki finds Takuto and calls out his name and he remembers Mitsuki. It becomes a heartfelt moment.
