= List of Witch Hunter Robin episodes =

This is a list of episodes from the anime series Witch Hunter Robin. They are arranged in accordance to episode number. The series uses two theme songs. The opening theme "Shell" was written by Hitomi Mieno, composed and arranged by Hideyuki Daichi Suzuki, and performed by Bana. The ending theme "half pain" was also written by Hitomi Mieno and performed by Bana and was composed by Takao Asami and Taku Iwasaki.

== Episode list ==
No.	Title	Original release date	English air date
1	"Replacement"	July 3, 2002	February 16, 2004
Robin Sena arrives at the STN-J's Raven's Flat office in Tokyo a little earlier than expected, and is mistaken for "one of Amon's girls", so is told to go away. The STN-J's witch hunting team discuss the previous night's hunt and capture of Kent Nishihama who, under interrogation, had claimed to have acquired his power from his friend Yugi Higashi. The witch hunting team set out again to the warehouse where Higashi has been hiding out. Meanwhile Takuma Zaizen and Yurika Dojima go and get Robin, who has been waiting patiently in Harry's cafe/bar, and take her to join the rest of the team at the warehouse. They arrive just as Higashi is getting the better of Amon. Robin has the opportunity to demonstrate her pyrokinetic abilities, allowing the team to capture Higashi. The team thanks Robin for her help, except for Amon who simply asks if Robin could "use her power more efficiently". Robin is surprised at the policy of capturing witches, but Miho Karasuma explains that the STN-J consider it "more humane" than killing them. Back at the office, Karasuma welcomes Robin to the STN-J.
2	"Addicted to power"	July 10, 2002	February 17, 2004
The STN-J is ordered to take out Kazuya Misawa, a businessman recently acquitted of the charge of murdering his partner, which witnesses say was done by way of a curse. The media frenzy surrounding the case and an ex-cop with an axe to grind complicate matters as the team tries to ensure that the public remains in the dark about the existence of witches.
3	"Dancing in darkness"	July 17, 2002	February 18, 2004
When the bodies of mummified witches begin to turn up left and right, the STN-J team finds itself facing a serial murderer, who seems to be active every 40 years or so. But with the suspect of the earlier murders having been swept overboard at sea decades ago, who or what exactly are they facing now?
4	"Stubborn aesthetics"	July 24, 2002	February 19, 2004
Robin Sena's daily routine takes her through a park, after her morning prayers. When she discovers that three dead bodies were discovered there prior to her coming to Japan, she and Miho Karasuma decide to investigate further, unaware of the danger that they're placing themselves in as their foe can flay a person alive.
5	"Smells like the wandering spirit"	July 31, 2002	February 23, 2004
The STN-J has to look for a witch who has mysteriously disappeared. Investigating the places where the homeless of the city congregate, they hope to find a clue as to the location of their target. But when a regular human vagrant is driven mad by fear, they soon find themselves facing an opponent unlike any they've encountered before.
6	"Raindrops"	August 7, 2002	February 24, 2004
Robin's Vespa runs out of gas in the middle of nowhere, but she's soon rescued from an approaching thunderstorm by Eiko Yano, who offers her a lift back into town. But when her benefactor is found dead the very next day, Robin finds herself mixed up in a case where the size of one's foe is not indicative of the danger one faces.
7	"Simple-mind"	August 14, 2002	February 25, 2004
When a wrecked car with a dead body inside is dredged out of the bay, the STN-J finds itself embroiled in a bank robbery case involving 200 million yen. What initially seemed an open and shut case becomes morally ambiguous when not the remaining suspect Tazawa Tsuneo, but his preadolescent nephew Mamoru Kudō is revealed to be a powerful witch and thus their target.
8	"Faith"	August 21, 2002	February 26, 2004
Who may judge the value of a human life? This is what the STN-J must ask when Yakuza members turn up dead due to witchcraft. A doctor's destiny is to save lives, but miracles that save the lives of the innocent are paid for with the lives of the guilty.
9	"Sign of the Craft"	August 28, 2002	March 1, 2004
A case of death by burning seems straightforward when a perfect match comes up on the STN-J database. The suspect has died leaving a note confessing to three murders, but two have yet to occur. When the second person on the list dies in the same manner as the first, is it a case of murder beyond the grave or a new facet of witchcraft?
10	"Separate lives"	September 4, 2002	March 2, 2004
Robin and Dojima work undercover as waitresses at Harry's while searching for Yutaka Kobari, a witch who disappeared two years ago and also the son of Master, the owner of Harry's. But they are not the only ones searching for him. Will father and son be reconciled before Yukata's past catches up with him?
11	"The soul cages"	September 11, 2002	March 3, 2004
A witch using electricity kills two men and disappears. STN-J knows he's hiding in Walled City, but the place is a maze and no one wants to talk. And once they've found the witch, they still have not discovered where his power came from.
12	"Precious illusions"	September 18, 2002	March 4, 2004
A witch calls Robin back to Walled City to confront her with ancient knowledge. A hacker attacks the STN-J system as the agents search for Robin. Though Robin is safe, her encounter leaves her with an unknown relic, as well as questions not just about STN-J and hunters, but about Robin herself.
13	"The eyes of truth"	September 25, 2002	March 8, 2004
An inquisitor comes to Japan to evaluate a witch's chances of becoming a hunter. Solomon Headquarters' powers awakened, but their methods may have been too tough to survive. Suspicion of Robin rises, though Amon attempts to diffuse it.
14	"Loaded Guns"	October 2, 2002	March 9, 2004
Amon and Robin go on an unsuccessful hunt. An unseen enemy shoots at Robin with witch-slaying bullets but Amon denies the attack. Secretly, Robin turns over a cartridge casing to Michael to study. Soon, not even Robin's home is safe, as those that hunt her attack those close to her.
15	"Time to say Goodbye"	October 9, 2002	March 10, 2004
Robin hides in Raven's Flat, protected by Michael, Sakaki, and Karasuma who are seeing parallels between Robin and the woman she replaced, Kate. Amon's absence causes Robin's trust in him to waver, but a visit from Master soothes her fears. When an armed force attacks headquarters, Robin is forced to flee, alone.
16	"Heal the pain"	October 16, 2002	March 11, 2004
Using Amon's contact Nagira, Robin loses those who pursued her. With both Amon and Robin missing and Sakaki injured, Karasuma and Dojima must pick up the slack, something both women find difficult. Robin saves Dojima from a solo hunt gone bad, but refuses to stay in contact to protect her. Nagira shares a photo that raises more questions for Robin, while Dojima reveals Robin's safety to Karasuma and Master.
17	"Dilemma"	October 23, 2002	March 15, 2004
STN-J continues to struggle with two missing members and one too injured to hunt, making Dojima suggest asking Robin for help. Karasuma turns her down, despite worries about her own fading power. Robin babysits an unusual girl and runs into Dojima, who has been searching for her. Later, Robin asks Nagira why he has been helping her, but doesn't get a straight answer.
18	"In my pocket"	October 30, 2002	March 16, 2004
Nagira meets with a contact in Walled City, who shares a rumor about a "Fragment of Wisdom" that was left behind by the witch Methusaleh, which many, including Solomon Headquarters, are searching for. STN-J notices an increase in murders of witches in Walled City. Robin remembers something she had left in her apartment, only to find it gone. Nagira's search leads him into trouble, but Robin saves him with Michael's help and they realize the nature of the "Fragment of Wisdom".
19	"Missing"	November 6, 2002	March 17, 2004
Nagira and Robin discuss the "Fragment of Wisdom" and take it to a witchcraft researcher, whose wife Hitomi seems to recognize Robin. Nagira hears of a new lead, ends up running into someone unexpected. Hitomi's interest in Robin is explained, and more of both the goals of Zaizen and Robin's own are revealed.
20	"All I really oughta know"	November 13, 2002	March 18, 2004
The sinister Hunter known as Sastre has his sights set on Robin. Meanwhile the "Fragment of Wisdom" is stolen from Nagira's safe and winds up in the hands of Sastre. In the oncoming fight, however, Robin realizes she can see Sastre's attacks as they come at her and is able to defeat him. Her powers have fully awakened and according to Amon she is now a witch.
21	"No way out"	November 20, 2002	March 22, 2004
Coming to terms with her newly achieved witch status, Robin decides to meet it head on and track down Solomon's hunters before they find her. Another hunter, an earth craft user, fights with Robin but is defeated thanks to her witchcraft and her awoken power.
22	"Family Portrait"	November 27, 2002	March 23, 2004
Dojima meets with Amon. Nagira and Robin trace Amon's latest activities, which lead them to a house belonging to an old lady. There they discover a diary of a man who co-operated with Solomon Headquarters fifteen years ago doing genetic research. There is also a photograph of a woman very similar to Robin, with Father Juliano in the background. Later on Nagira meets with Amon, who reveals his intention to hunt Robin.
23	"Sympathy for the Devil"	December 4, 2002	March 24, 2004
The episode starts off with Amon and Dojima discussing Zaizen's motives. It is revealed that by developing Orbo he wants to perform hunts using regular humans. Meanwhile in STN-J, Karasuma, Michael and Sakaki are trying to uncover information about Solomon Headquarters' genetic research. Amon confronts Robin to hunt her down, but does not end up killing her. Later on Sakaki is attacked by the Factory's units and survives thanks to the intervention of Robin and Amon.
24	"Rent"	December 11, 2002	March 25, 2004
Zaizen and the Factory turn on STN-J. Karasuma is taken by the Factory. Michael, Kosaka, and Hattori decide to join STN-J hunters to move against Zaizen. They cut off the security system from the STN-J office to Factory and investigate Zaizen to track down his activity. Soon after that, Solomon Headquarters does an immediate transfer of an imprisoned scientist from Japan to Solomon Headquarters in Europe. Zaizen begins his plan to abduct the scientist to use him for perfecting the Orbo. STN-J successfully defeats the Factory, but the scientist dies at the battle scene. Before his last breath, he mistakes Robin as "Maria" and then after realizing his mistake he says a mysterious line calling Robin "the devil's child."
25	"Redemption day"	December 18, 2002	March 29, 2004
Robin is sad about the scientist's line thinking that she is an existence that must not have been born. Father Juliano Colegui, Robin's Guardian, explains her about her past and origins as well as his reason for wanting her hunted. Juliano confesses the reason he ordered hunters to hunt Robin is due to his own weaknesses and fear. STN-J team plans and executes its plan to rescue Karasuma from the Factory. Simultaneously, an attack is planned on the Factory by Solomon Headquarters.
26	"Time to tell"	December 24, 2002	March 30, 2004
The final episode uncovers the origin of Project Robin. It is here that Amon and Robin confronts Zaizen in a final showdown to uncover the truth behind Todo's project. The episode ends off with the Factory destroyed, and most of the STN-J escaping unharmed. The only exceptions are Amon and Robin who have either escaped or been killed in the resulting collapse of the Factory. At the ending, the reactions of the various other characters hinted at them being alive but are said to be dead for their own safety. After the ending song, there is a scene in which a woman wearing similar clothes like Robin comes out of a taxi as a new hunter for STN-J.
