= List of Gravion episodes =

The cover of the Gravion complete collection box set US DVD release by ADV Films. The cover features Luna, Mizuki, Eina and Leele.

The cover of the Gravion Zwei complete collection box set US DVD release by ADV Films. The cover features Faye Xin Lu and Luna.

Gravion (超重神グラヴィオン, Chōjūshin Guravion; lit. Super Heavy God Gravion) is an anime television series produced by Gonzo. The story centres on Eiji Shigure who is searching for his missing sister Ayaka. This leads him to the castle of Klein Sandman, and there he joins the fight against the invading mechanical lifeforms, the Zeravire.

Gravion aired in Japan every Monday from October 7, 2002, to December 16, 2002, and ran for 13 episodes. Episodes 9 and 10, and 11 and 12 were shown together on the same night, leading to just an 11-week run.

The opening song for Gravion was "Nageki no Rosario" by JAM Project, the ending song was "WISH" by YURIA. Whenever God Gravion is assembled, the song "Gasshin! God Gravion!" by JAM Project feat. Masaaki Endo would play as its combination insert song in Japanese only. In the third episode of Gravion Zwei it would be performed by The Singing Maids (Ena (Mai Nakahara / Jessica Boone), Luna Gusuku (Haruna Ikezawa / Luci Christian), Thoria (Haruko Momoi / Tiffany Grant), Brigitta (Rie Kugimiya / Cynthia Martinez), Yumi (Naomi Orikasa / Nancy Novotny), Marinia (Nana Mizuki / Monica Rial) and Tulie (Mikako Takahashi / Tiffany Terrell)) with Klein Sandman (Sho Hayami / Jason Douglas) in both Japanese and English. YURIA also performs the insert song "KISS ME"

Volume 1 of Gravion was released on DVD in the United States by ADV Films on May 25, 2004, and came with a box for all three volumes. Volume 2 was released on July 20, 2004, Volume 3 was released on September 14, 2004 with a complete collection consisting of all three volumes released on January 17, 2006.

Gravion Zwei (超重神グラヴィオンZwei, Chōjūshin Guravion Tsuvai; "Zwei" is German for "two"), was the followup to the original series, also produced by Gonzo. The series answered the questions generated from the first series.

Gravion Zwei aired from January 8 to March 25 in Japan, running for twelve additional episodes.

The opening song for Gravion Zwei was "Kurenai no Kiba" by JAM Project, the ending song was "La♪La♪Bye" by HoneyBee. Whenever Soul Gravion is assembled, the song "Enno Gasshin! Soul Gravion!" by JAM Project feat. Yoshiki Fukuyama would play as its combination insert song.

Volume 1 of Gravion Zwei was released on DVD in the United States by ADV Films on March 8, 2005, and came with a box for all three volumes. Volume 2 was released on May 3, 2005. Volume 3 was released on July 5, 2005. A complete collection was released on July 25, 2006. On March 31, 2009, ADV released the Gravion Complete Collection, containing all episodes from Gravion and Gravion Zwei in one box.

Both Gravion and Gravion Zwei were created and directed by Masami Ōbari, with Fumihiko Shimo writing the scripts and Masumi Itō composing the music.

== Gravion ==
No.	Title	Directed by	Written by	Original release date
1	"The Fortress of the Deity"; Transliteration: "Kyoshin no Sumu Shiro" (Japanese: 巨神の棲む城)	Masami Ōbari	Fumihiko Shimo	October 7, 2002
At a party in Klein Sandman's castle a woman wearing a purple dress leaves the party, taking off her disguise to show it is really Eiji Shigure. Luna Gusuku and Mizuki Tachibana are watching him from the monitors and set the alarm off to capture him. Eiji escapes into the depths of the castle, stumbles across a giant robot and Toga Tenkuji steps out. Eiji states he is in the castle looking for his sister, Ayaka. The castle starts shaking and Eiji falls through a crack in the ground under the castle. Back at the party Sandman appears, announcing that Earth is currently under attack from aliens. The aliens start attacking Earth, and the units inside Sandman's castle launch a counterattack. Eiji finds himself inside a plane that is to be launched in the counterattack, and he has to fight in the air battle against the aliens. As the battle looks hopeless, the mecha Gran Kaiser, piloted by Toga appears. During the battle, Luna contacts Eiji to tell him to let her control the plane. A full Zeravire alien appears, and the Gran Kaiser's attacks prove ineffective. The Grand Divas combine with the Gran Kaiser to create the God Gravion.
2	"Mission of Gravity"; Transliteration: "Jūryoku no Shimei" (Japanese: 重力の使命)	Hiroyuki Tsuchiya	Fumihiko Shimo	October 21, 2002
Gravion faces off across from the Zeravire whilst Sandman and his guests watch on. The President orders the navy to launch the particle projection cannon at the Zeravire. Mizuki wonders who is piloting the G-Shadow, no one knows. Eiji tries to escape the Gravion but realizes he cannot just walk out. The particle projection cannon hits the alien to no effect. Gravion is smashed into its constituent pieces, and Toga and his Gran Kaiser sink to the bottom of the ocean. The Zeravire stops attacking and builds a cocoon around itself. Sandman expels the world leaders from his castle. Eiji meets Sandman and demands his sister back. Sandman explains the letter he sent was a fake to get Eiji to come to the castle to pilot the G-Attacker, as Eiji, like his sister, has a G-factor enzyme in his body that allows him to adapt to changes in gravity. Mizuki explains that Ayaka is missing since training. The Zeravire breaks out of its cocoon, ready to attack again. After some taunting, Eiji agrees to fly the G-Attacker. The Zeravire has evolved to be stronger than before and the Gravion is powerless against it. Using the Graviton Pressure Punch, Gravion is finally able to inflict damage on the Zeravire. Gravion fires its Graviton Arc and obliterates the Zeravire.
3	"Labyrinth"; Transliteration: "Meikyū" (Japanese: 迷宮)	Akihiko Nishiyama	Fumihiko Shimo	October 28, 2002
Eiji is confronted by Luna and other maids in the morning bringing him a change of clothes. Trying to clean up Eiji breaks the tap in his bathroom. Eiji breaks out of his room and climbs to the roof of the castle where he encounters Toga. World leaders are having a meeting with Raven about how they defeated the Zeravire, frustrated that Sandman will not let them help. Raven claims they are not practiced enough due to the long period of peace on Earth, and to leave future battles to Gravion. Toga says he will help Eiji find Ayaka, heading to over the tower where she disappeared from. They encounter Luna bathing and she attacks Eiji for being a pervert. She stops when she sees Toga there as well. Trying to avoid Eina they fall down a shaft to a room full of robots who attack them. A Zeravire appears in Earth's atmosphere as Eiji, Toga and Luna are trapped in the basement. Toga dispatches the robots quickly, as this used to be his training area. Eina and Mizuki go out to fight the Zeravire in the G-Driller and are about to be defeated when Toga appears interrupting the attack. Gravion assembles and fights the Zeravire. This time the Graviton Arc is ineffective against the Zeravire, as it has evolved since last time. The Graviton Sword is used and defeats the Zeravire.
4	"The Princess in the Tower"; Transliteration: "Tō no Naka no Himegimi" (Japanese: 塔の中の姫君)	Yōsuke Kabashima; Naoyasu Hanyū	Fumihiko Shimo	November 4, 2002
Eina and the other maids see a ghostly figure in the tower late at night. Early the next day Eiji is training in a pinball-based simulator to test his resistance to centrifugal forces. Eina reports the ghost to Sandman and Luna. Eiji conjectures the ghost is actually Ayaka lost in the castle and goes to hunt for her. Eiji and Toga see the ghost and she passes through a mirror, they find they can follow, into the South Tower. Toga states that each tower has a secret, and they are banned from entering by Sandman. They catch up with the ghost and it turns out to be a girl called Leele. Sandman turns up at Leele's quarters, and she hides Eiji and Toga in the closet. Eiji overhears Sandman saying that Leele is the pilot of the G-Shadow. Sandman gets a message saying a Zeravire is on its way and its time to dispatch the Gravion. The navy of the world government attempts to attack the Zeravire to no avail. Gravion attacks the Zeravire to no effect, as it has evolved again. Due to damage to the left arm of Gravion, Eina must do the Graviton Pressure Punch maneuver, however it fails. The Graviton Sword is used, but is blocked by the Zeravire. Leele suggests using the Gravity Crescent, part of the G-Shadow to attack. This destroys the Zeravire. Sandman formally introduces Leele to the other pilots, however she runs away when they try and talk to her.
5	"The Girl Who Won't Laugh"; Transliteration: "Warawanai Shōjo" (Japanese: 笑わない少女)	Hiroyuki Kanbe	Fumihiko Shimo	November 11, 2002
Leele is in a field picking flowers and she sees her father, but he transforms into a monster. She wakes up, as it was just a dream, one she has been having frequently. World leaders are analyzing the material that makes a Zeravire, noting it is metal, but also living matter. The scientist hypothesizes that these Zeravire are being sent to Earth by something. The government officials are investigating Sandman but can find no information on him. When Eiji and Toga are in a hot spring and encounter Sandman, Eiji starts questioning him and he leaves. Eina is practicing in a simulator against the Zeravire, and keeps failing to activate the Gravity Tornado. Luna suggests they all go on a field trip to improve relations between them and Leele. They all go out of the castle for a picnic in the forest. Eina starts the barbecue flames and Leele gets scared and runs away, having a flashback to the dream. A Zeravire starts attacking Earth at this point and the government air force try and stop it to no avail. Luna finds Leele at a house in the forest, and Leele reveals her family are all dead, but she doesn't remember what happened to them. Luna comforts her by saying they have all lost people close to them. Mizuki requests Leele must move out and she agrees. The Zeravire ignites the chemical plant around the Gravion, and Leele becomes immobilized with fear seeing the flames and cannot launch the Gravity Crescent. Luna climbs down to the G-Shadow and convinces Leele to overcome her fear and launch the Gravity Crescent, when combined with the Gravity Pressure Punch destroys the Zeravire.
6	"Toga's Day Off"; Transliteration: "Tōga no Kyūjitsu" (Japanese: 斗牙の休日)	Akihiko Nishiyama	Kiyoko Yoshimura	November 18, 2002
The maids leave on a shopping trip, and Eiji and Toga sneak out, disguised as maids, and head into the city. This is the first time Toga has ever seen the city. Eiji and Toga go to a clothes store to get clothes to replace their maid outfits. The maids tell Raven that Eiji and Toga are missing, and he tells them to search for them. Toga gets separated from Eiji, and Toga tries to buy a bird from a man on the sidewalk, but the man gets beaten up by thugs. Eiji runs into some friends from school and they go to a restaurant together. He tells his friends that he is piloting Gravion, but they do not believe him. Eiji's friends show him a picture of Gravion, but it has the Earth Federation Alliance logo on it. The government has been telling the people that Gravion is their weapon. After karaoke, Eiji and Toga leave their friends, and Eiji goes to get a cola when the city lights go out. A Zeravire appears.Leele, Luna, Mizuki and Eina must fight alone against the Zeravire. Eiji and Toga signal Mizuki using fireworks as she flies over the city. There are four Zeravire that are going to fuse into one. Gravion assembles and quickly defeats the Zeravire. Raven punishes Eiji and Toga for going out without permission.
7	"Drill Girl of the Beach"; Transliteration: "Nagisa no Doriru Shōjo" (Japanese: 渚のドリル少女)	Hirokazu Yamada	Atsuhiro Tomioka	November 18, 2002
Luna has gone to Okinawa, where she was born. Luna visits her father's grave, as it is one year since he died on a mission to detect the Zeravire. Luna runs into an old family friend who implores her to stay longer. She visits the beach and the G-Driller with Eina inside comes through the sand. The entire team shows up, as they have been ordered to get some recreation by Sandman. At the International Peace Center in Okinawa, there is a meeting between world leaders about the Zeravire when a Zeravire bursts through the floor. Leele gets a sense that the Zeravire is there, and Mizuki gets a message to activate Gravion. Gravion moves to the Peace Center but the Zeravire is not there. Suddenly the Zeravire bursts through the ground and attacks, but goes underground again before the Gravion can retaliate. Luna takes the G-Driller underground to drive it out. Gravion fires Graviton Missiles at close range, but there is no effect. Luna attempts the Graviton Tornado Punch, although they have never been able to do that move before. Luna succeeds and destroys the Zeravire. The team go back to relaxing on the beach when Sandman arrives, leaving them stunned.
8	"Super Heavy Battlefield"; Transliteration: "Chōjū Senjō" (Japanese: 超重戦場)	Yū Kō; Hiroshi Kimura	Yūji Hosono	November 25, 2002
Gravion is fighting a Zeravire and attempts the Graviton Pressure Punch, but Gravion is too close to the critical point to use it. Gravion uses the Gravity Crescent and destroys the Zeravire, but reaches the critical point and breaks apart. Eiji is admonished by Raven for not following orders, but Eiji blames Luna for failing to use the Graviton Pressure Punch. Gravion is being analyzed by the Earth Federation Alliance scientists revealing the makeup of the Gravion. The scientist notes that when the Gravion fights, gravity is altered around it. Eiji climbs into the Gran Kaiser cockpit to attempt to learn how to do Toga's role. The Zeravire appear inside the castle, grown from a part that was left attached to Gravion and start attacking. One is about to kill Toga when Mizuki shows up and machine guns it down. Eiji wakes up inside the Gran Kaiser as sees the Zeravire in the hangar. Sandman asks Eiji to defeat the Zeravire alone. Eiji is having trouble controlling the Gran Kaiser, not used to its strength. The Gran Kaiser is knocked to the level below by the Zeravire, allowing the Gran Kaiser to pick up weapons. After attacking with weapons fail, Toga tells Eiji to use the Elgo Mode, which will greatly stress the pilot. Eiji is in severe pain after activating the Elgo Mode, but the Gran Kaiser is far more powerful. Eiji pilots the Gran Kaiser out into space to destroy the Zeravire. After it is destroyed, the Gran Kaiser falls back to Earth, seemingly lifeless.
9	"A Distant Embrace"; Transliteration: "Tōi Hōyō" (Japanese: 遠い抱擁)	Shingo Suzuki	Fumihiko Shimo	December 2, 2002
Sandman's castle is being repaired. Mizuki reminisces about Ayaka, who was her best friend. Eiji has recovered from the injuries he sustained fighting off the Zeravire, but he runs off to Mizuki's room after the maids attempt to give him a physical. Mizuki leads Eiji to the West Tower and tells Eiji about Ayaka's stay in the castle. Ayaka trained too hard and became bedridden, as this was when she disappeared after a mysterious accident. Inside the West Tower they find a large monument, similar to the one where the Gravion was built. Mizuki accesses the computer system and discovers the West Tower manipulates gravity, just like the Gravion. Mizuki conjectures that Sandman has unlocked the secrets behind gravity to be able to build the Gravion. Mizuki finds the security footage from when Ayaka disappeared. The video just shows her disappearing off screen with no explanation. Suddenly the monument lights up, and the West Tower starts shaking. Mizuki falls down the West Tower, and has a vision of Ayaka. Eiji manages to catch her, but he falls after her. Eiji has a flashback of being with his sister, and she tells him that they will meet again one day, as long as he keeps fighting Gravion. Eiji wakes up in Luna's arms. The rest of the team has found Eiji and Mizuki in the West Tower, as they had not fallen at all, instead they just passed out. Sandman makes an order to modify Gravion to be able to be piloted unmanned.
10	"Crack"; Transliteration: "Kiretsu" (Japanese: 亀裂)	Yukio Okazaki	Fumihiko Shimo	December 2, 2002
The Gran Phantom System is performing at ten percent less than the piloted Gravion. The team are out shopping in the city when a Zeravire appears. The Zeravire lands in the city and destroys buildings to convert them into a cocoon. The Zeravire is emitting theta rays and in thirty minutes everything within one hundred kilometers will die. The ground opens up beneath Cecile, and she moves underground. Eiji jumps down to rescue her. Mizuki arrives with the Gravion. Eina and Luna fly over to try to help Eiji. Cecile is being pulled into the heart of the Zeravire. Gravion combines and the Gran Phantom System is used to pilot the G-Attacker. The Gravion shoots the tentacles emanating from the Zeravire, but they keep coming, not allowing Gravion to get close. Eiji runs on foot up to the Zeravire to rescue Cecile. Toga orders the Gravion to attack the Zeravire, and Eiji pleads with him to wait. Toga orders Luna to attack in the G-Driller. Eiji reaches Cecile just before the G-Driller is about to launch. Toga fires the Graviton Arc instead, and Eiji is blown clear. Gravion destroys the Zeravire with the Gravity Crescent with just seconds before the radiation is about to be released. Eiji punches Toga for being willing to sacrifice Cecile. Eiji then announces he is quitting.
11	"The Thing Which Was Lost"; Transliteration: "Ushinawareta Mono" (Japanese: うしなわれたもの)	Akihiko Nishiyama	Fumihiko Shimo	December 9, 2002
Eiji is sleeping in his apartment when Yumi shows up to rouse him. Yumi asks him what he has been doing, but does not believe he has been fighting on Gravion. Raven reflects on how Toga has been stunted socially as he has been raised to just be a pilot, and how contact with Eiji was supposed to change this. Toga has not been eating and locked himself away since Eiji quit. Cecile brings Toga food in his room and he apologizes to her. Eiji is back at school and Leele has followed him, waiting outside his school when Eiji spots her. Toga ruminates with Luna that perhaps he is missing something that makes him human. Eiji tells Leele he will not return. At the castle, Sandman is shown footage of two Zeravire that are headed to Earth, and will arrive in ten minutes. As Leele has left the castle, the G-Shadow will be piloted by the Gran Phantom System. Airforce craft engage the Zeravire in space, but are ineffective. Toga is telling Luna that fighting and winning are not enough, that he needs something more. Luna comforts him, saying he will be able to find this. Leele implores Eiji to return to help curb Toga's actions, as he is the only one who can. They then see the Zeravire coming through the atmosphere and run for an air raid shelter. The airforce drop a new type of bomb on the Zeravire but it has no effect. Gravion appears and fights against the Zeravire, but nothing will touch it, not even the Graviton Tornado Punch. Leele realizes they can't win with the Gran Phantom System, and tries to flee the bunker. Eiji chases and Yumi pushes him out the way of some falling tiles, only to be struck herself.
12	"Because You're With Me"; Transliteration: "Kimi ga Iru Kara" (Japanese: 君がいるから)	Michita Shiraishi	Fumihiko Shimo	December 9, 2002
Gravion continues the fight against the Zeravire but is losing. The Zeravire has put out a jamming signal, so the G-Call to summon the Gran Knights is not working. Yumi regains consciousness and tells Eiji to get on the Gravion to protect everyone. Cookie appears and lifts the rocks off of Yumi, and takes her to the medical treatment room. The Zeravire continues to deflect every one of Gravion's attacks, destroying the Graviton Sword. Sandman orders a search of the origin of the jamming signal, and finds it comes from a third Zeravire higher in the atmosphere. Sandman orders Gravion to destroy this one first. Gravion attempts to attack it, but the two Zeravire from below come up and attack Gravion, which then plummets back down to Earth. Eiji and Leele catch up to the Gravion which disassembles to pick them up. Sandman tells them not to recombine, but rather split their forces to attack all three Zeravire at once. The G-Driller manages to destroy the first Zeravire, but it reforms. Leele, Mizuki and Eiji destroy the Zeravire in the sky, but it broadcasts a laser into space just before it disintegrates. The jamming signal is gone however, so they can attack the Zeravire on the ground, blowing a hole in the protective barrier. Gravion combines within the Zeravire's protective barrier, destroying the Zeravire within. Gravion then quickly dispatches the final Zeravire. Eiji visits Yumi in the hospital, and she has recovered. Eiji tells her that he is going back to fight with Gravion, stepping out the window and on to Gravion. Eiji is welcomed back by everyone at the castle.
13	"White Steel Fang"; Transliteration: "Shirogane no Kiba" (Japanese: しろがねの牙)	Masami Ōbari	Yūji Hosono	December 16, 2002
The Zeravire in deep space receive an order to destroy all human life, by adapting to whatever is required to overcome the obstacle that would stop them. The Zeravire are evolving faster than expected. The firepower is greater than is needed to destroy humanity, they are evolving especially to overcome Gravion. A new weapon is being developed by the air force which is attracting attention. Gravion is being repaired from the previous fight. The President of the Earth Federation Alliance announces the new weapon, which is a large robot. Raven suggests that the White Steel Fang be used. A Zeravire lands where the new Earth Federation Alliance robot is standing, and waits. Sandman says he cannot approve a dispatch of Gravion, as the target of the Zeravire is Gravion and has evolved to counter all of Gravion's attacks. A new sword is added to Gravion, the Graviton Breaker. Sandman approves the dispatch now Gravion has a new weapon. Gravion launches a high speed surprise attack on the Zeravire but it survives the attack. The Zeravire pulls out a sword and parries Gravion's Graviton Breaker. Sandman prepares the White Steel Fang as Gravion is losing its battle. Just as the Zeravire is about to attack the Gravion again, the White Steel Fang appears and deflects it. Gravion picks up the White Steel Fang, which is the Super Heavyweight Sword. The Gravion performs the Super Heavyweight Slash technique with the White Steel Fang and the Zeravire is destroyed. At the castle, Ayaka emerges from a body of water.

== Gravion Zwei ==
No.	Title	Directed by	Written by	Original release date
1	"Super Heavy God, Second Coming"; Transliteration: "Chōjū Shin Sairin" (Japanese: 超重神再臨)	Masami Ōbari	Kiyoko Yoshimura	January 8, 2004
The Earth Federation Alliance military is flying out over the ocean to intercept some Zeravire. They are testing the new mass production Gravion, the Gran Troopers. Alex Smith and Faye Xin Lu introduce themselves to the President as new pilots of the Gran Troopers. Eiji and Luna are working in the kitchen with the rest of the crew, after Eiji bet the crew to be slaves in a game of Mahjong against the castle maids. Sandman has been missing from the castle for some time. He has been attending conferences around the world. There is an emergency warning at the castle that the Zeravire are approaching. Eiji and Luna find Toga's childhood room. Luna has a flashback to meeting Toga the first time as a child. Luna regrets not giving Toga a photo album when they were children, as he had no toys. Eiji and Luna get the G-Call to warn the rest of the pilots of the Zeravire attack. The President of the Earth Federation Alliance launches the G-Soldiers to intercept with the Gran Troopers, as Toga launches the Gran Knights to intercept with the Gran Divas. The Earth Federation Alliance military prove ineffective as they lack the power of gravity. Toga attacks the Zeravire, but it repels the attack by shielding itself. Physical attacks fail. Gran Kaiser cannot activate the Elgo Mode without Sandman present, so they cannot combine to form Gravion. Sandman is trapped at the airport as all flights have been grounded. Sandman makes contact with them and allows for Gravion to combine. Gravion attacks with the Double Pressure Punch and breaks through the Zeravire's shield, allowing it to be destroyed by Gravion. On Llambias, Hugi states to his sister, Lufira, that it is time to remake the planet.
2	"Elegant Reunion"; Transliteration: "Uruwashiki Saikai" (Japanese: 麗しき再会)	Yukihito Ōgomori	Fumihiko Shimo	January 15, 2004
Eiji's friends are checking out the Earthgertz's website and it's all under construction. One link works and it's a map. They all head out to follow the map through a jungle. They arrive at Sandman's castle. Inside the castle, the pilots are exercising, and Eiji is getting exhausted. Eiji meets his friends all in the guest room and asks why they have come. Eiji expresses his displeasure that everyone thinks it is the Gran Troopers who beat the Zeravire, not the Gran Divas. Eina and the maids give Eiji's friends a tour of the castle, starting with the Gran Diva hangars. The review films of the Gravion's various battles against the Zeravire. The maids then take them to the control room, where Sandman is. He says that they are all going on a picnic. The pilots bring the Gran Divas to the picnic in case of Zeravire attack. At the picnic, the pilots reminisce about Eiji's time at the castle. Mizuki gets drunk and makes a pass at Raven. Eiji tells Yumi that he has not seen his sister yet. Kaori climbs into the G-Driller and accidentally turns it on, launching it with her and Yumi inside. The team fly off to track them. Sandman chases after it on horseback, jumping onto the G-Driller. He uses his crystal to reset the G-Driller, and combine Gravion, stopping the G-Driller. The President of the Earth Federation Alliance views a painting of Sandman from the eighteenth century. It is claimed he is an alchemist and a time traveler named Count Saint-Germain.
3	"Scalding Battle!! Gravion Hot Springs!!"; Transliteration: "Nettō! Gurabi Onsen!!" (Japanese: 熱闘!愚裸美温泉!!)	Masami Ōbari	Yūji Hosono	January 22, 2004
Sandman is taking all the maids and pilots on a trip to a hot springs resort, as the annual Earthgertz trip. Raven ruminates about how irritating it is that they cannot do anything until the Zeravire show their face again, refusing to go to the hot springs with the rest. Eina is shy about going into the hot springs, and Mizuki drags her in. Eiji and Toga relax in the hot springs when some of the castle maids show up to wash Eiji. Struggling to get away, Eiji breaks through the wall of the hot springs and slides down the mountain, with Toga following. Eiji and Toga run through the women's bath, annoying all the girls. Alex Smith, Faye and the G-Soldiers arrive, just as Toga and Eiji slide in. Eiji and Toga are out in the town at night, and see Sandman on a bridge with a man who claims to be his brother. The ground is rumbling, as the Zeravire is drilling inside the mountain. At the hotel, they are playing table tennis, and Alex and Mizuki win against Eina and Luna. Sandman, along with Leele, then challenges Alex and Mizuki to a game to win the hot springs ticket as the prize. He plays with just his shoe instead of a racket. Sandman beats them, winning all rounds. The ground continues to rumble, as the mountain erupts. Gravion enters the volcano, but they only have ninety seconds due to the extreme heat. The maids sing to encourage the Gran Knights. Gravion intercepts the Zeravire pulling it out of the volcano and destroying it. Faye is awestruck by seeing Gravion for the first time. The crew gives the hot springs ticket to Raven, as a way of thanking him for staying at Sandman's castle while they had enjoyed their time at the hot springs.
4	"From the Bottom of the Wave"; Transliteration: "Nami no Soko Yori" (Japanese: 波の底より)	Kazuki Tachibana	Kiyoko Yoshimura	January 29, 2004
The Earth Federation Alliance thermal power plant has received a warning that another Zeravire has arrived on Earth in the ocean. However, none of the G-Soldiers are aware of that warning. Leele is in the G-Shadow, looking for a sign of a Zeravire in the ocean. However, Leele loses signal from the control room, where Sandman and Raven are, right after a Zeravire is sighted. Meanwhile, maintenance is being performed on the G-Driller for Luna and Eina, and the Gran Kaiser for Toga and is ready as well. However, Eiji and Mizuki must stay behind, since both the G-Attacker and the G-Striker are not operational. Eiji begs to Eina to disguise himself as her. Toga, Luna, and Eiji go and find Leele in the ocean. As they have found Leele, the Zeravire attacks them. Toga is reminded from Eiji to protect Leele, rather than to sacrifice her. Leele, unconscious, wakes up and sees Toga. Toga tells her that they are in the Earth Federation Alliance thermal power plant, located in the ocean. Toga tells Sandman that the Zeravire is draining the energy from the thermal power plant to evolve in size. Sandman then predicts that the Zeravire will challenge Gravion to a battle in its evolved state. Toga and Leele explore the thermal power plant, and they encounter Zeravire along the way. Toga protects Leele by fighting the Zeravire alone. Eiji and Luna arrive in time to help, while Mizuki and Thoria arrive to help as well. The Gran Divas combine into Gravion, but Toga cannot withstand the Elgo Mode, due to a lack of oxygen. Leele then aids Toga, in his cockpit, to perform the Super Heavyweight Slash technique to defeat the Zeravire. Back at Sandman's castle, Toga is put to bed-rest, while the rest of the crew gathers around him to encourage him to get better.
5	"The Dream Solitary Isle"; Transliteration: "Yumemiru Kotō" (Japanese: 夢みる孤島)	Yoshinari Saitō	Kiyoko Yoshimura	February 5, 2004
The Gran Knights make their way to a secluded amusement park on an island. Their mission is to search for a sign of the Zeravire in the amusement park. Back at Sandman's castle, the castle maids tell Raven they are jealous that the pilots are the only one allowed to go to the amusement park, and not them. The pilots enjoy some rides at the amusement park, not seeing a sign of the Zeravire. Leele reminisces on her time with Sandman. On the Ferris wheel, Leele and Toga are reminded of loneliness, as they both were separated from the outside world. The castle maids still continue to beg Raven to allow them to go to the amusement park, but Raven tries to avoid them. On another ride, Eiji tells Mizuki that he knows that Ayaka is hidden within the castle. Meanwhile, as Leele, Toga, Luna, and Eina are walking, they witness people mutating into Zeravire. Eiji and Mizuki arrive just in time to help. The Zeravire begin multiply to combine into a large Zeravire. Cookie helps the pilots make their way to their Gran Divas, in order to combine into Gravion. Gravion performs the Super Heavyweight Slash technique to defeat the Zeravire. However, the Zeravire begins to infiltrate the Gravion. The Zeravire begin to attack Leele, but soon she realizes she is a Zeravire as well. Sandman laughs at the fact that Leele is a Zeravire.
6	"Lamenting Rosario"; Transliteration: "Nageki no Rozario" (Japanese: 嘆きのロザリオ)	Kenichi Hamazaki	Kiyoko Yoshimura	February 12, 2004
It is revealed that Mizuki is a spy working for the Earth Federation Alliance intelligence division to leak information about Gravion, and she receive a gold card for her hard work. Leele has a dream that Sandman is carrying her, as he cries seeing Llambias being destroyed. Outside, Leele's room, Dica advises the other pilots to allow Leele to rest, as she is mentally unstable from the experience she had with the Zeravire at the amusement park. Toga was told by Raven that during that experience, Leele was able to peek into the memories of the Zeravire, which lead to mental stress by acquiring too much of their memories. The maids soon realize that Mizuki is nowhere to be found. A letter written by Mizuki reveals her secret of being a spy. Another letter written by her reveals a pathway to a virtual room. The pilots views the room displaying footage of Sandman discussing with Llambias representatives about creating Gran Sigma, a weapon relative to Gravion, in order to restore Llambias. This footage also reveals that Sandman is from the Zeravire family. Sandman appears in the virtual room and unveils that Leele is his daughter. Sandman tells the pilots in order to save life, one must end life as well, in order to restore Llambias. In the footage, Llambias is having a war with Selias. Sandman and Hugi argue about the restoration of Llambias. Then suddenly, Sandman calls out the Gran Sigma. Selians begin attacking Llambias, while Gran Sigma tries to stop the Selians only to no avail. Sandman tells the pilots that before Llambias was destroyed, he and Leele arrived on Earth, and both his wife, Lufira, and his brother, Hugi, both supposedly died. Sandman says that he plans on telling Leele that he is her father. He kept this secrets from the pilots before out of fear, but he still asks if the pilots are willing to fight the Zeravire along with him. Leele wakes up and talks with Toga. She tells him that she wants to remember her past. Toga takes her to the virtual room to reveal the footage of Sandman being her father. Toga and Leele meet up with Eiji. However, due to the mental stress, she falls over the balcony into the water. Eiji chases after her and rescues her. Eiji lashes out at Toga, calling him heartless.
7	"The Shattered Goddess"; Transliteration: "Kudakareta Megami" (Japanese: 砕かれた女神)	Masami Ōbari	Kiyoko Yoshimura	February 19, 2004
Sandman and the castle maids are in Leele's bedroom, caring for her. Meanwhile, Eiji expresses about Toga's heartlessness to Luna. Toga is in the garden, pondering about actions toward Leele, when Eina runs over to find him there. Eina returns to Sandman's castle to converse with the castle maids, calling herself helpless against Toga. An alarm is sounded, alerting a Zeravire nearby. The pilots, excluding Leele, gather to their respective Gran Divas, in order to make their way toward the Zeravire. The Zeravire attacks. Toga initiates Elgo Mode to combine into Gravion but is corrupted by the Zeravire before the combination. Toga suffers much physical and mental damage, due to the stress that the Zeravire inflicted on the Gran Kaiser. Eina then plans to initiate her Proto Gran Diva Mode, taking control of all the functions of every Gran Diva, to try and save Toga. Eina sacrifices herself, seemingly destroying the Zeravire. All the pilots and castle maids mourns on behalf of her sacrifice. However, the Zeravire continues to attack, pushing the G-Driller with Luna into the water. Just when the Zeravire is about to destroy the Gran Kaiser, Faye and the G-Soldiers intercept the Zeravire with their Gran Troopers.
8	"When Gravity Becomes Weak"; Transliteration: "Jūryoku ga Otoroeru Toki" (Japanese: 重力が衰えるとき)	Yukihito Ōgomori	Yūji Hosono	February 26, 2004
Eiji is requested to look for Toga on motorcycle, as he is worried about Toga. News reports are announcing about Gravion in contrast to the Gran Troopers. Gravion will be full operational in three days, due to the extensive damage the Zeravire caused during their last battle. The maids do maintenance of all of the Gran Divas, in hope that will the pilots will win the next battle. Luna, currently under medical treatment in the Earth Federation Alliance military base, demands to know the whereabouts of the other pilots. Faye, keeping Luna under surveillance, wonders why Luna is passionate about the other pilots. Toga finds himself in a poor urban downtown area. Eiji asks his friends, at a restaurant, to help look for Toga in the downtown area. News reports continue to announce about the Gran Troopers to the public. The G-Soldiers are alerted that a Zeravire is over the nearby ocean. The Zeravire crashes directly toward the ship of the President of the Earth Federation Alliance, but is trapped and destroyed by a force-field created by the ship. The President dispatches the G-Soldiers to defeat other Zeravire. Sandman is alone is his bedroom, fearing that Hugi will show up to destroy Earth. Raven shows up to console him. Just as Sandman is about to give up, Raven removes her mask to reveal that she is really Ayaka. She questions Sandman what he was fighting for. Due to his cowardice, Ayaka snaps his focus and tells him never to give up. The Gran Troopers are still pursuing the Zeravire, resulting in defeat of the Zeravire using the Lightning Bomber. However, Sandman realizes the light produced by the Lightning Bomber would be the same light Hugi will use to destroy Earth. Toga, still in the downtown area, is bullied by a couple of thugs, but Faye rescues him in time.
9	"The Crimson Fang"; Transliteration: "Kurenai no Kiba" (Japanese: 紅ノ牙)	Yoshinari Saitō	Fumihiko Shimo	March 4, 2004
Leele, being cared for by the castle maids, seems to be feeling better, but still is showing signs of mental fatique and stress. Graviton disruption is detected by the battle between the Gran Troopers and the Zeravire. Eiji contacts his friends to see if Toga is found. Faye brings Toga to an abandoned orphanage, reminiscing on the time that Toga, Eiji, and her spent together. She is jealous that Toga is the pilot of the Gran Kaiser, but is disappointed that Toga caused the loss of two pilots. Faye offers Toga to be her subordinate, but Eiji barges in and intervenes. Mizuki finds Luna in the medical facility of the Earth Federation Alliance military base. Eiji reminds Toga that Eina sacrificed herself for nothing. This then causes them to start fighting. Eiji suggests to Toga to apologize to Leele. Soon after, a Zeravire is spotted hovering the city. The Zeravire is causing a space distortion, allowing more Zeravire to appear in the city. As Mizuki and Luna make their way for their escape, they encounter the Presider of the Earth Federation Alliance. Mizuki brings him along to join up Gran Troopers. The President witnesses how poorly the Gran Troopers are combating against the Zeravire. Back at Sandman's castle, Toga carries Leele in his arms, as the other pilots dispatch in their respective Gran Divas, to combine into Gravion. Cookie and Thoria also join to help. Gravion arrive to aid the Gran Troopers. Cookie and Thoria both are shot by the Zeravire. Gravion is being crushed by another Zeravire. Suddenly, a bright green light eliminates all the Zeravire in one blow. The source of the green light is revealed to come from Sol Gravion.
10	"The Sun's Flames"; Transliteration: "Taiyō no Honō" (Japanese: 太陽の炎)	Yōsuke Kabashima	Yūji Hosono	March 11, 2004
Both the Gran Knights and the G-Soldiers are shocked to see that Sol Gravion eliminated all the Zeravire in one blow. They are also shocked to see that Eina was the pilot of Sol Gravion. Eina tells the other pilots that when she sacrificed herself, her memories were transferred to her other body that resided in the Moon. Eina initiates Elgo Mode on Sol Gravion, and she allows Eiji to pilot it. Hugi allows more Zeravire to appear in the city, but both Gravion and Sol Gravion defeat all the Zeravire, performing the Super Heavyweight Slash technique. However, this enrages Hugi. All the pilots are received the upgraded versions of the Gran Divas. Luna and Eina test out the Geo Javelin, Mizuki tests out the Geo Stinger, Leele is given the Geo Caliber, and Eiji is given the Geo Mirage. Sandman is reminded of the relationship between the Gran Knights and their roles within the Sol Gravion. A large image of Hugi on the Zeravire appears on Earth to announce that he will destroy the entire human race. To intervene, Sandman launches his castle into outer space. The Gran Divas combine to become Sol Gravion to destroy the image of Hugi on the Zeravire.
11	"Creation Star Machine"; Transliteration: "Sōseiki" (Japanese: 創星機)	Yukihito Ōgomori	Kiyoko Yoshimura	March 18, 2004
The President of the Earth Federation Alliance announces on the upcoming battle with the Zeravire. The maids prepare food for the pilots. In outer space, Toga and Leele bond closer as they view Earth. Luna, spying on them, is startled when Eiji appears behind her. In an elevator, Mizuki and Raven talk about her regret for working for the Earth Federation Alliance. Back at the Earth Federation Alliance military base, Faye converses with Alex Smith about significant existence. Faye then orders him to dispatch all the G-Soldiers, when darkness suddenly covers the sky. The source of this darkness is due to Hugi's Genocidron System. The Zeravire are seen in outer space. The Gran Knights dispatch to stop the Zeravire. The Gran Divas combine into Sol Gravion. None of the attacks of the Sol Gravion is able to eradicate the Zervaire. The Gran Troopers start to dispatch into outer space. Inside the Genocidron System, the Gran Knights meet Hugi. Hugi calls for Sandman, but Raven tells him it's a trap. Sandman plans to sacrifice himself in order to save Earth. Using his body, Sandman combines with his Gran Divas to create Sigma Gravion. He defeat the Zeravire, using Graviton Break. The Genocidron System creates a Genocidron, which has absorbed Selias and Llambias, the two neighboring worlds. Lufira appears and stabs Sandman in the chest with a sword. Sandman then apologizes to Hugi.
12	"The Spiritual Song of Victory"; Transliteration: "Tamashii no Gaika" (Japanese: 魂の凱歌)	Masami Ōbari	Fumihiko Shimo	March 25, 2004
Tension rises when the Genocidron seems to be more powerful. Eina reports to the others that Sandman is using the Sigma Gravion. Back on Earth, Eiji's friends are worried about him and the other pilots. The attacks of Sol Gravion have no effects to the Genocidron. Meanwhile, Hugi engages Sandman in a sword battle, telling him that it was his fault for Lufira's death. Sol Gravion continue to fight against the Genocidron only to no avail. Leele plans to sacrifice herself, by standing in front of the Genocidron. Eiji runs out to chase her to catch her. Hugi senses Leele, therefore stopping anymore attacks from the Genocidron. Toga is then able to defeat the Genocidron, giving relieve from everyone on Earth. However, Hugi still plans to absorb the Earth. He attempts to choke Sandman, until Lufira suddenly appears. Hugi resumes engaging Sandman in battle, but is defeated and killed. Sandman tells the pilots that it is his farewell, but they refuse to say goodbye to him. Ayaka reveals to the pilots that she was Raven, and goes to him in Sigma Gravion. Ayaka explains to the pilots that putting on the mask made one look like Raven. Ayaka tells Luna that the mask was given by Luna's father. Sandman and the pilots make their way to Earth, until the alarm sounds, alerting the Genocidron nearby. The Genocidron plans to crash into Earth, in order to destroy the human race. Sol Gravion and Sigma Gravion combine to form Ultimate Gravion, to perform the Super Heavyweight Flame Emperor Slash technique, destroying the Genocidron. Everyone back on Earth rejoices for this victory. Back on Earth, a wedding is held for Sandman and Ayaka. In the end, Ayaka throws the bouquet, and all the maids try to catch it. However, Toga ends up catching it and asks Eiji if they'd marry much to the latter's disgust and the girl's shock who explain Toga that marrying is usually an act a man and woman commit however, Eina adds that two males could marry each other too if they want to.
