= Kakuriyo: Bed & Breakfast for Spirits =

Japanese light novel series

- First light novel volume cover

かくりよの宿飯 (Kakuriyo no Yadomeshi)
- Genre: Romantic comedy; Supernatural
- Light novel
- Written by: Midori Yūma
- Illustrated by: Laruha
- Published by: Fujimi Shobo
- Imprint: Fujimi L Bunko
- Original run: April 13, 2015 – October 15, 2025
- Volumes: 13
- Manga
- Written by: Midori Yūma
- Illustrated by: Waco Ioka
- Published by: Enterbrain
- English publisher: NA: Viz Media
- Magazine: B's Log Comic
- Original run: April 30, 2016 – present
- Volumes: 12
- Anime television series
- Directed by: Yoshiko Okuda (S1); Joe Yoshizaki (S2); Ryuuta Nakano (S2) (Note: Series episode direction (シリーズ演出).)
- Written by: Tomoko Konparu
- Music by: Takurō Iga
- Studio: Gonzo; Makaria (S2) (Note: With Production Assistance (制作協力) credited to Luminas in the opening credits.)
- Licensed by: Crunchyroll; SEA: Muse Communication (S1) Tropics Entertainment (S2)
- Original network: Tokyo MX, AT-X (S1–S2); KBS Kyoto, BS Fuji (S1)
- English network: SEA: Animax Asia
- Original run: April 2, 2018 – December 18, 2025
- Episodes: 38
- Manga
- Written by: Midori Yūma
- Illustrated by: Tsugaru Toba
- Published by: Kodansha
- Magazine: Monthly Shōnen Sirius
- Original run: January 26, 2023 – January 26, 2026
- Volumes: 11

Kakuriyo: Bed & Breakfast for Spirits (Japanese: かくりよの宿飯, Hepburn: Kakuriyo no Yadomeshi; lit. 'Afterlife Inn Cooking') is a Japanese light novel series written by Midori Yūma and illustrated by Laruha. Fujimi Shobo have published thirteen volumes from April 2015 to October 2025 under their Fujimi L Bunko imprint. A manga adaptation with art by Waco Ioka has been serialized in Enterbrain's josei manga magazine B's Log Comic since April 2016. It has been collected in twelve tankōbon volumes. An anime television series adaptation by Gonzo aired from April to September 2018. A second season by Gonzo and Makaria aired from October to December 2025.

== Plot ==
Aoi Tsubaki is a college student who has the ability to see Ayakashi, a trait she inherited from her deceased grandfather. One day, when Aoi walks past a torii shrine, she sees an Ayakashi sitting there who announces that it is hungry. However, after giving it food, Aoi is kidnapped by the Ayakashi, an Ogre called Odanna. He takes her to the Hidden Realm, a world where all the Ayakashi live. He tells Aoi that her grandfather owed him a debt, and as compensation, she must marry him. Aoi negotiates with the Ogre instead, asking to work at the ogre's inn, the Tenjin'ya.

== Media ==
=== Light novel ===
Written by Midori Yūma and illustrated by Larhua, the light novels were published by Fujimi Shobo under their Fujimi L Bunko imprint from April 13, 2015, until October 15, 2025. The series has been collected in 13 volumes total.

No.	Release date	ISBN
1	April 13, 2015	978-4-04-070575-0
2	September 15, 2015	978-4-04-070679-5
3	February 15, 2016	978-4-04-070808-9
4	June 15, 2016	978-4-04-070939-0
5	November 15, 2016	978-4-04-072086-9
6	May 15, 2017	978-4-04-072252-8
7	November 15, 2017	978-4-04-072472-0
8	April 13, 2018	978-4-04-072675-5
9	October 15, 2018	978-4-04-072676-2
10	August 10, 2019	978-4-04-073282-4
11	December 15, 2020	978-4-04-073660-0
12	March 15, 2022	978-4-04-074278-6
13	October 15, 2025	978-4-04-075994-4

=== Manga ===
A manga adaptation illustrated by Waco Ioka has been serialized in Enterbrain's magazine B's Log Comic since April 30, 2016. Viz Media announced at their Anime Central 2018 panel that they had licensed the manga.

Another manga adaptation, illustrated by Tsugaru Toba, was serialized in Kodansha's Monthly Shōnen Sirius from January 26, 2023, to January 26, 2026.

==== First manga ====
No.	Original release date	Original ISBN	English release date	English ISBN
1	November 15, 2016	978-4-04-734320-7	January 1, 2019	978-1-9747-0372-2
Chapters 1-5
2	May 15, 2017	978-4-04-734554-6	March 5, 2019	978-1-9747-0373-9
Chapters 6-10
3	November 11, 2017	978-4-04-734874-5	May 7, 2019	978-1-9747-0374-6
Chapters 11-15
4	March 31, 2018	978-4-04-735078-6	July 2, 2019	978-1-9747-0499-6
Chapters 16-19
5	September 15, 2018	978-4-04-735306-0	September 3, 2019	978-1-9747-0770-6
Chapters 20-23
6	August 30, 2019	978-4-04-735584-2	September 1, 2020	978-1-9747-1042-3
Chapters 24-30
7	February 1, 2021	978-4-04-7364929	January 4, 2022	978-1-9747-2648-6
Chapters 31-37
8	April 1, 2022	978-4-04-7369788	March 7, 2023	978-1-9747-3677-5
Chapters 38-44
9	April 1, 2023	978-4-04-737415-7	April 9, 2024	978-1-9747-4370-4
Chapters 45-49
10	February 1, 2024	978-4-04-737809-4	March 11, 2025	978-1-9747-5219-5
Chapters 50-56
11	November 29, 2024	978-4-04-738209-1	January 13, 2026	978-1-9747-6274-3
Chapters 57-63
12	October 31, 2025	978-4-04-738667-9	November 10, 2026	978-1-9747-6861-5

==== Second manga ====
No.	Release date	ISBN
1	May 9, 2023	978-4-06-531508-8
2	August 8, 2023	978-4-06-532525-4
3	November 9, 2023	978-4-06-533494-2
4	March 8, 2024	978-4-06-534768-3
5	June 7, 2024	978-4-06-535687-6
6	October 30, 2024	978-4-06-536652-3
7	January 30, 2025	978-4-06-538176-2
8	April 30, 2025	978-4-06-539127-3
9	July 30, 2025	978-4-06-539989-7
10	October 30, 2025	978-4-06-541070-7
11	February 27, 2026	978-4-06-542115-4

=== Anime ===
An anime television series adaptation was announced in November 2017. It is produced by Gonzo and directed by Yoshiko Okuda, with scripts handled by Tomoko Konparu, characters designs done by Yōko Satō and music composed by Takurō Iga. The 26-episode two consecutive cours series aired from April 2 to September 24, 2018, on Tokyo MX and other networks. The first opening theme song is "Tomoshibi no Manimani" (灯火のまにまに), performed by Nao Tōyama, while the first ending theme song is "Sai -color-" (彩 -color-), performed by Manami Numakura. The second opening theme song is "Utsushiyo no Yume" (ウツシヨノユメ; 'A Dream of the Temporal World'), performed by Nano, while the second ending theme song is "Shiranai Kimochi" (知らない気持ち; 'Unknown Feelings'), performed by Megumi Nakajima. Both Crunchyroll and Funimation streamed the series. The first season covers Volumes 1 to 5 of the light novel.

A second season was announced in May 2024. It is produced by Gonzo and Makaria, with Joe Yoshizaki replacing Okuda as director, with Tomoko Konparu returning to write the scripts; Hidemi Katsura replacing Satō as the character designer, and Takurō Iga returning to compose the music. The season aired from October 2 to December 18, 2025. (Note: Tokyo MX listed the season premiere on October 1 at 24:00, which is effectively October 2 at midnight JST.) The opening theme song is "Tōryanse" (とおりゃんせ), while the ending theme song is "Namida no Recipe" (涙のレシピ; 'The Recipe for Tears'), both performed by Nao Tōyama. Crunchyroll streams the series. Tropics Entertainment licensed the series in Southeast Asia for streaming on the Tropics Anime Asia YouTube channel.

=== Stage play ===
A stage play adaptation was announced in March 2018 during a pre-screening event for the anime adaptation, which ran from September 5 to 9, 2018, at Theater Sun-mall, and later from September 13 to 16 of the same year at Nishitetsu Hall.

== Reception ==
As of October 2017, the light novel has over 340,000 copies in print.

== See also ==
- The Ayakashi Hunter's Tainted Bride, a manga series also written by Midori Yūma
- Kunon the Sorcerer Can See, another light novel series illustrated by Laruha
