= Jeremy Inman =

American voice actor

- Occupations: Voice actor; ADR director; script writer
- Years active: 2000–present

Jeremy Inman is an American voice actor and ADR director, known for his work in anime dubs. He had prominent roles in Android 16 in Dragon Ball Z and Dragon Ball Z Kai, in addition to Akitaru Obi in Fire Force.

== Voice acting ==
=== Anime series ===
List of voice performances in anime series
Year	Title	Role	Notes	Ref.
2000	Dragon Ball Z	Android 16	Funimation dub	
2002	YuYu Hakusho	Gouki, Suzuki		
2007	B't X	Crow	Illumitoon Entertainment dub, Ep 4-5	
2007	One Piece	Patty, Masira, Magellan	Funimation dub	
2010	RIN: Daughters of Mnemosyne	Sue		
2010	Oh! Edo Rocket	Arms		
2011	Dragon Ball Z Kai	Android 16		
2011	Fairy Tail	Taurus		
2013	A Certain Scientific Railgun	Hebitani		
2013	Tenchi Muyo! War on Geminar	Uncle		
2013	Last Exile: Fam, the Silver Wing	Cirrus		
2015	Ping Pong the Animation	Michio		
2016	Dagashi Kashi	Yō Shikada		
2016	Touken Ranbu: Hanamaru	Kondou Isami, Ookanehira		
2016	Show by Rock!! Season 2	Kamui		
2016	Izetta: The Last Witch	Grosskopf		
2016	All Out!!	Kita		
2016	Chaos Dragon	Enumael		
2016	Aquarion Logos	Kento Yoshida		
2016	Bikini Warriors	Smith		
2016	Yuri on Ice	Jean-Jacques Leroy		
2017	Akiba's Trip: The Animation	Kage		
2017	Saga of Tanya the Evil	Gregorio von Turner, Sean		
2017	Chaos;Child	Yuuma		
2017	ACCA: 13-Territory Inspection Dept.	Flaco		
2017	Sakura Quest	Tomoharu Kume		
2017	WorldEnd	Eboncandle		
2017	Alice & Zoroku	Suzuki		
2017	Gosick	Garnier		
2017	Restaurant to Another World	Elder, Lionel		
2017	In Another World with My Smartphone	Barral		
2017	Star Blazers: Space Battleship Yamato 2199	Hajime Hirata		
2018	Space Battleship Tiramisu	Vulgar		
2018	Dances with the Dragons	Rolca Klem Bagfotte		
2018	Overlord II	Staffan Havish		
2018	B't X	X	Anime Midstream/Sound Cadence dub	
2018	Island	Kanejo		
2018	Black Clover Season 2	Mohawk		
2018	Hinomaru Sumo	Shibakiyama		
2019	Fire Force	Captain Akitaru Obi	Main role	
2019	Dr. Stone	Wasilewski		
2020	Id: Invaded	Kazuta		
2020	By the Grace of the Gods	Hughes		

=== Film and specials ===
List of voice performances in film and special episodes
Year	Title	Role	Notes	Ref.
2010	Dragon Ball: Curse of the Blood Rubies	King Gurumes		
2012	Fullmetal Alchemist: The Sacred Star of Milos	Breda		
2012	Sengoku Basara: The Last Party	Yoshinao		
2013	Fairy Tail the Movie: Phoenix Priestess	Taurus		
2019	One Piece: Episode of East Blue - Luffy and His Four Friends' Great Adventure	Patty, Pisaro		

=== Video games ===
List of voice performances in video games
Year	Title	Role	Notes	Ref.
2004	Dragon Ball Z: Supersonic Warriors	Android 16		
2004	Dragon Ball Z: Budokai 3	Android 16		
2012	Borderlands 2	Taggart the Huntsman		
2016	Dragon Ball Xenoverse 2	Android 16		
2018	Dragon Ball FighterZ	Android 16		
2019	Borderlands 3	Drunk William		
2020	Dragon Ball Z: Kakarot	Android 16		
2020	Visage	Dwayne Anderson		

=== Live action ===
- Shin Godzilla – Izumi

== ADR staff credits ==
=== ADR directing ===
List of ADR directing credits
Year	Title	Role	Notes	Ref.
2015	The Heroic Legend of Arslan	S1: Assistant ADR director; S2: ADR director		
2015	Gangsta	Assistant ADR director		
2016	ReLIFE	ADR director		
2017	Saga of Tanya the Evil	ADR director		
2017	Akashic Records of Bastard Magic Instructor	ADR director		
2017	Saiyuki Reload Blast	ADR director		
2017	Urahara	ADR director		
2018	Hakata Tonkotsu Ramens	ADR director		
2018	Teasing Master Takagi-san	ADR director	Funimation dub, Season 1	
2018	Space Battleship Tiramisu	ADR director		
2018	Golden Kamuy	ADR director		
2018	How Not to Summon a Demon Lord	ADR director		
2018	The Master of Ragnarok & Blesser of Einherjar	ADR director		
2018	Harukana Receive	Assistant ADR director		
2018	B't X	ADR director	Anime midstream/sound cadence dub	
2019	My Roommate Is a Cat	ADR director		
2019	Kemono Michi	ADR director		
2020	Id: Invaded	ADR director		
2020	Deca-Dence	ADR director		
2021	Mushoku Tensei: Jobless Reincarnation	ADR director		
2021	Back Arrow	ADR director		
