= The Ayakashi Hunter's Tainted Bride =

Japanese manga series

- First tankōbon volume cover

傷モノの花嫁 (Kizumono no Hanayome)
- Genre: Historical fantasy; Romance; Supernatural
- Manga
- Written by: Midori Yūma
- Illustrated by: Mamenosuke Fujimaru
- Published by: Kodansha
- English publisher: NA: Kodansha USA
- Imprint: KCx
- Magazine: Palcy
- Original run: May 28, 2023 – present
- Volumes: 12
- Novel series
- Written by: Midori Yūma
- Published by: Kodansha
- Imprint: Kodansha Taiga
- Original run: October 13, 2023 – present
- Volumes: 4
- Manga

Kōkoku no Sōheki
- Written by: Akimine Kamijyo
- Published by: Kodansha
- Imprint: KCx
- Magazine: Monthly Shōnen Sirius
- Original run: January 26, 2026 – April 24, 2026
- Volumes: 1
- Manga

Kōtō Onmyō Gakkō
- Written by: Sen Izumino (composition)
- Illustrated by: Tsugaru Toba
- Published by: Kodansha
- Magazine: Monthly Shōnen Sirius
- Original run: May 26, 2026 – present

The Ayakashi Hunter's Tainted Bride (Japanese: 傷モノの花嫁, Hepburn: Kizumono no Hanayome) is a Japanese manga series written by Midori Yūma and illustrated by Mamenosuke Fujimaru. It began serialization on Kodansha's Pixiv-based Palcy manga service in May 2023. A novel version began publication under Kodansha's Kodansha Taiga imprint in October 2023.

The subtitle of the Japanese version in the early stage of the manga serialization was The Reason Why Abused Me Being Loved at First Sight by the Fierce God of the Empire (虐げられた私が、皇國の鬼神に見初められた理由, Shiitagerareta Watashi ga, Kōkoku no Kijin ni Misomerareta Riyū), which was no longer used from the third chapter onwards. The change was also officially implemented in the sixth volume.

== Synopsis ==
Nanao Byakurenji is a girl with high spiritual energy. Before her 15th birthday, she was set up by her cousin Akemi, who caused her kidnapping by ayakashi. An unknown ayakashi left a cursed scar called "spiritual seal" on Nanao's forehead, and left her suffering from exclusion and isolation by most people in her hometown. Until Nanao turns 17, Yako Benitsubaki meets and saves Nanao from her people's abuse. Yako then recognized her spiritual energy level and starts a contract marriage with her, then Nanao realizes that Yako has to ingest women's blood with high spiritual energy in order to survive. They meet different people and ayakashi, deal with many trials, as they support and fall in love with each other.

== Characters ==
Nanao Byakurenji (白蓮寺 菜々緒, Byakurenji Nanao) / Nanao Benitsubaki (紅椿 菜々緒, Benitsubaki Nanao)
Voiced by: Hina Yōmiya (PV, voice comic)
Nanao is a kind and compassionate girl, who's good at household chores and has high spiritual energy. Her cooking has a powerful effect that can make people fulfill their spiritual and physical energy and stay well. She possesses the Great Seal, a talent that Himiko calls extremely rare and even feared by the Great Ayakashi. However, she was initially unaware of her own abilities. This led to her unconsciously activating her powers to seal Ayakashi when she was kidnapped by him before her 15th birthday. As a result, she was misunderstood by her conservative, ignorant, and prejudiced tribe members as having retained the ""spiritual seal" (妖印)" from Ayakashi and was subjected to bullying and abuse.After she begins a contract marriage with Yako, she develops true courage and gradually begins to fall in love with Yako, and as the story progresses, she begins to learn about the Five Great Spells (五大咒術) and explore her own potential.
Yako Benitsubaki (紅椿 夜行, Benitsubaki Yako)
Voiced by: Yūichirō Umehara (PV, voice comic)
Yako is the 1st Division Captain of The Imperial Chamber of the Onmyo (皇國陰陽寮) and the present head of the Benitsubaki clan guarding The Five Element Barrier (五行結界). He's a man with courage and a sense of justice. Due to his family's ancestral curse, he has to ingest the blood of women with high spiritual energy in order to survive, yet it gifts him strong combat capability and ability to speed up recovery. He visits Byakurenji's villages to find suitable candidates for marriage and to provide him blood, saves Nanao from the Byakurenji's abuse and recognizes her spiritual energy level, that makes him start a contract marriage with her. He falls in love with Nanao and promises to kill the ayakashi which left the "spiritual seal" on her.After fighting against Nurriyaon alongside The Imperial Chamber of the Onmyo, and after Nanao sealed Nurriyaon within Tokiko, Yako and Nanao officially held their wedding. On his 26th birthday, Himiko told him that the scar on Nanao's forehead was caused by sealing Great Ayakashi, not the "spiritual seal" left by Ayakashi.
Zenki (前鬼) & Goki (後鬼)
Voiced by: Takuya Eguchi (Zenki), Haruka Tomatsu (Goki) (voice comic)
They are married couple shikigami that serve Yako. Zenki is the confident husband who mainly responsible for defense and combat, while Goki is the steady wife who acting as both a head maid and a bodyguard. Both of them serve to support Yako and Nanao.
Yaichirou Benitsubaki (紅椿 夜一郎, Benitsubaki Yaichirō)
Yako's father and the Director of The Imperial Chamber of the Onmyo (皇國陰陽寮). Yaichirou has a good relationship with his children and is supportive of the marriage between Yako and Nanao, but he doesn't delve into the problem of his wife Tokiko's excessive control over their eldest son Takaya. He was formerly Tokiko's bodyguard when she lived in the palace, sometimes sneaking her out of the palace due to the heavy restrictions her mother placed on her. He had known about Tokiko's connection to Nurarihyon but said nothing of it seeing how it effected Tokiko after she attempted to kill Yako when he was a child, causing her to suffer a breakdown over not knowing why she tried to kill her own son while begging Yaichirou not to abandon her.
Tokiko Benitsubaki (紅椿 朱鷺子, Benitsubaki Tokiko)
Voiced by: Haruka Tomatsu (PV)
Yako's mother and The Yamoto Empire (大和皇國)'s former emperor's niece. Her father was a member of the royal family, and her deceased mother was from the Shogun. Because of the marriage between the mother's family ancestors and the great yokai Nurarihyon, she inherits the Nurarihyon's gifts derived from her mother's family, each item equipped with special abilities such as being able to hide her presence. After the birth of the second son Yako, who inherited the cursed constitution of the Benitsubaki family, Tokiko began to be overprotective and controlling towards Takaya, while hating Yako to the point of attempting to assassinate him due to Nurarihyon's instincts causing her to hate the Tsubaki Demon within Yako. She also upholds the supremacy of status and descent, that makes her show hostility towards individuals such as Nanao. She attacks Hinata during the Edo Fireworks Festival but accidentally injures Takaya. After her emotional breakdown, she ingests Nurarihyon's Elivir and becomes a Great Yokai to attack Yako and others, later being possessed by Nurarihyon itself. After Nanao sealed Nurarihyon, who had possessed Tokiko, she communicated with Tokiko in her mental realm to understand her true feelings. The two reconciled and reached a consensus to team up against Nurarihyon. Tokiko severed her "Blood Ties" with Yako in the process, resulting in the loss of all memories related to Nurarihyon and Yako, along with a reduction in her lifespan to just one year. The chaos caused by Tokiko led to the Benitsubaki family's status ranking being lowered by the current emperor.
Takaya Benitsubaki (紅椿 鷹夜, Benitsubaki Takaya)
Yako's older brother, who's in charge of the Research Center 1 of The Imperial Chamber of the Onmyo (皇國陰陽寮). Takaya is smart and he treats valued individuals and colleagues with gentleness and friendliness. He also has a rich knowledge and expertise in developing items. Due to Tokiko's excessive control, he was restricted in both his personal life and interpersonal relationships. At first, he disagreed with the marriage between Yako and Nanao, and he spoke to Nanao with an impolite attitude, but he changed his mind when Nanao showed tenacity against Tokiko. As the story progresses, he begins to support Nanao and improve his relationship with Yako, while resisting Tokiko's ideas and actions.
Sayoko Benitsubaki (紅椿 小夜子, Benitsubaki Sayoko) / Sayoko Kokujo (黑条 小夜子, Kokujo Sayoko)
Yako's younger sister and the 3rd Division member of The Imperial Chamber of the Onmyo (皇國陰陽寮). Sayoko is talented, virtuous, and skilled in spells, but she sometimes shows a stern side. She has a good relationship with the family except her mother and is supportive of the marriage between Yako and Nanao. She married into the Kokujo clan before Yako met Nanao.
Yozakura Benitsubaki (紅椿 夜桜, Benitsubaki Yozakura)
Yako's youngest sister. Yozakura has an outgoing personality. She has a good relationship with the family except her mother. She returns to the Yamato Empire shortly after Nurarihyon's attack to visit with her family. She is considered a prodigy having mastered all of the spells in the Yamato Empire at a young age and is currently studying magic in Great Britain. She is supportive of Yako and Nanao's marriage.
Rentarou Midorikawa (綠川 蓮太郎, Midorikawa Rentarou)
Rentarou is the 2nd Division Captain of The Imperial Chamber of the Onmyo (皇國陰陽寮). He's calm and judgmental and is skilled at using sniper rifles. He is the third son of a noble family that was forced into the Chamber of the Onmyo due to a scandal. Based on the influence of his contract with shikigami Kamihime, he must abide by the rule of staying single for the rest of his life. He used to be the vice captain of 10th Division, and was the leader of Yako's team at that time.
Tatsuo Kurimiya (栗宮 達雄, Kurimiya Tatsuo)
Tatsuo is the 2nd Division member of The Imperial Chamber of the Onmyo (皇國陰陽寮) and Hinata's younger brother. He's outgoing but not good at observing social atmosphere, dislikes the domineering attitude of nobles.
Hinata Kurimiya (栗宮 日向, Kurimiya Hinata)
Hinata is a member of Takaya's research institute in the Research Center 1 and Tatsuo's older sister. She interacts well with Takaya and treats Nanao very kindly. She and Takaya assisted Nanao in measuring spiritual energy during the captain's meeting. However, without knowing it, she was included in the investigation report about Takaya's possible contacts by Takei, which made her listed as an excluded target by Tokiko and shocked when she witnesses Takaya being stabbed by Tokiko to protect her, and then severely blames Tokiko for manipulating and hurting Takaya.
Himiko Kokujo (黑条 卑弥子, Kokujo Himiko)
Himiko is the 3rd Division Captain of The Imperial Chamber of the Onmyo (皇國陰陽寮) and belongs to the Kokujo clan guarding The Five Element Barrier (五行結界). As the captain with the highest spiritual power and oldest age, and a key figure in opening The Five Element Barrier (五行結界), she possesses outstanding talent for barrier spells, but is also eager to cultivate the next generation. She intervenes in Amon's attempt to investigate the incident of Nanao, who has been detected to have high spiritual power, and helps Nanao analyze her spiritual seal and explain the "Five Great Spells", assigning Sayoko to guide Nanao.
Natsuhiko Kokujo (黑条 夏彥, Kokujo Natsuhiko)
Natsuhiko is the 3rd Division Vice Captain of The Imperial Chamber of the Onmyo (皇國陰陽寮). He's shocked by Nanao's powerful energy during the testing of spiritual energy. He is the grandson of Himiko Kokujo and is gifted in barriers like his grandmother.
Momonoi Amon (桃ノ井 亜門, Amon Momonoi)
Amon is the 4th Division Captain of The Imperial Chamber of the Onmyo (皇國陰陽寮). After the havoc caused by Shinobu and Takei are calmed down, he serves as the host of the captain meeting and discussed with other captains how to capture Takei who is on the run. Without Yako's consent, he dispatches Yukiomi to bring Nanao to the meeting site to assist in the investigation. He openly questions Nanao's experience of being kidnapped by ayakashi during the captain's meeting, as well as his attempt to explore her spiritual power qualifications in depth after Nanao is detected high spiritual energy. The action is interrupted due to Himiko's intervention, and he is also taught a lesson by Sara and Maria for the offensive incident mentioned above.
Hideyo Suitengu (翠天宮 英世, Suitengu Hideyo)
Hideyo is a doctor who works in the hospital of The Imperial Chamber of the Onmyo (皇國陰陽寮) and belongs to the Suitengu clan guarding The Five Element Barrier (五行結界). He is upright, kind, and possesses advanced values, which makes him a reliable ally of Yako and hates unjust phenomena such as discrimination and persecution caused by excessively backward cognition and superstition. When Yako asks him to help diagnose Nanao's "spiritual seal" caused by ayakashi, he criticizes the Byakurenji clan for abusing Nanao and lack of correct understanding of ayakashi. He and his son Yukiomi are also supportive of the marriage between Yako and Nanao.
Yukiomi Suitengu (翠天宮 幸臣, Suitengu Yukiomi)
Hideyo's son and the 4th Division member of The Imperial Chamber of the Onmyo (皇國陰陽寮). Yukiomi is one of Yako's best friends. He's cheerful and charming, yet rational, possessing shrewd intelligence gathering abilities. Like his father, he hates the distorted social phenomena caused by overly conservative ideas and prejudice discrimination. He is also a key figure in facilitating the encounter between Yako and Nanao, having heard the rumors of Nanao's spiritual power.
Sara Suitengu (翠天宮 沙羅, Suitengu Sara)
Sara is the 5th Division Captain of The Imperial Chamber of the Onmyo (皇國陰陽寮) and belongs to the Suitengu clan. She is skilled in swordsmanship and using spells to summon souls for combat, as well as communicating with souls. She has a voice with soul energy, which enables her to conduct a leading dialogue by reciting the real name of the target, and make the target whose real name is recited respond to her forcibly, so as to collect information. She has a crush on Rentarō. She's unhappy that Amon openly exposes Nanao's heavy experience of being left with "spiritual seal" by ayakashi at the meeting site, and she's shocked by Nanao's powerful energy during the testing of spiritual energy. After Takaya clarifies the misunderstanding regarding Nanao's spiritual energy qualifications and Himiko intervenes in mediation, she and Maria teach Amon a lesson and become one of the captains who make friends with Nanao.
Shiro Daidaiin (橙院 士郎, Daidaiin Shiro)
Shiro is the 5th Division member of The Imperial Chamber of the Onmyo (皇國陰陽寮) and belongs to the Daidaiin clan guarding The Five Element Barrier (五行結界). During the captain's meeting, he reveals intelligence about Takei's past with the support of Sara.
Issei Kikuoji (菊大路一成, Kikuoji Issei)
Voiced by: Yuma Uchida (PV)
Issei is the 6th Division Captain of The Imperial Chamber of the Onmyo (皇國陰陽寮) and the next head of the Kikuoji clan. He's outgoing and full of human touch, skilled in using two knives and the power of Thunder God in battles. He holds a competitive mindset towards Yako. He stops Yako from interrupting Amon's investigation on Nanao at the captain's meeting. In essence, he's very unhappy that Amon openly exposes Nanao's experience of being left with "spiritual seal" by ayakashi, and he's even more shocked by Nanao's powerful energy when testing spiritual energy.After Takaya clarifies the misunderstanding regarding Nanao's spiritual energy qualifications and Himiko intervens in mediation, he apologizes to Nanao for Amon's impolite behavior.
In the appendix booklet of the special edition of Volume 7 of the manga, it is revealed that Issei's parents are Kikuoji clan's head couple: Yasunari (康成) and Chiyomi (千代美)。
Sosuke Byakurenji (白蓮寺 宗佑, Byakurenji Sosuke)
Sosuke is the 6th Division member of The Imperial Chamber of the Onmyo (皇國陰陽寮) and Nanao's childhood friend and neighbor from Byakurenji Village. He left his village five years before the story began due to hating their traditions and customs, often finding them annoying, and became a subordinate of Issei. Taking the captain's meeting as an opportunity, he reunites with Nanao. With Issei's assistance in clarifying to Yako that he did not participate in the persecution of Nanao, Yako's hostility towards him is eliminated.
Genryu Aoki (青樹 玄龍, Aoki Genryu)
Genryu is the 7th Division Captain of The Imperial Chamber of the Onmyo (皇國陰陽寮). He's shocked by Nanao's powerful energy during the testing of spiritual energy.
Maria Fujidō (藤堂 マリア, Fujidō Maria)
Maria is the 8th Division Captain of The Imperial Chamber of the Onmyo (皇國陰陽寮), Yukiomi's aunt and the present head of the Fujidō clan. She's also a divorced mother with two children, skilled in swordsmanship and possessing physical powers on par with men. Her nickname is the "Holy Mother of the Empire" due to her strength and love for her children. After the Byakurenji clan is severely degraded, the Fujidō clan is promoted and becomes one of a clan responsible for guarding The Five Element Barrier (五行結界). She's unhappy that Amon openly exposes Nanao's heavy Nanao's heavy experience of being left with spiritual seal by ayakashi at the meeting site, and is even more shocked by Nanao's powerful energy during the testing of spiritual energy. After Takaya clarifies the misunderstanding regarding Nanao's spiritual energy qualifications and Himiko intervenes in mediation, she and Sara teach Amon a lesson and become one of the captains who makes friends with Nanao. As Maria's mother came from Great Britain, she inherited considerable strength and spiritual power, making her one of the "Beloved Children of the Fairy Queen". She is the current caretaker of Reito and Akemi's daughter, Kotomi.
In the appendix booklet of the special edition of Volume 4 of the manga, it is revealed that Maria was once arranged by family members to marry a nouveau riche and resign, but her husband's family belittled her on the grounds that her housework skills were poor and her achievements were higher than her husband's, which made Maria threaten Yaichirō into helping her fight for divorce, she also successfully got rid of this marriage and obtained custody of her two children, returning to the position of captain.
Kyubei Hino (緋野 久兵衛, Hino Kyubei)
Kyubei is the 9th Division Captain of The Imperial Chamber of the Onmyo (皇國陰陽寮). He's shocked by Nanao's powerful energy during the testing of spiritual energy. it is later revealed that his shikigami is the Nine Tailed Fox Sensen.
Reiji Kyogoku (京極 零時, Kyogoku Reiji)
Reiji is the 13th Division Captain of The Imperial Chamber of the Onmyo (皇國陰陽寮) and Koyuki's older brother. He likes gambling, but he values Yako and Iseei, who were in the same school and the former 10th Division's comrades. He participates in the operation of supporting Yako in rescuing Nanao who's kidnapped by Takei.
Koyuki Kyogoku (京極 小雪, Kyogoku Koyuki)
Koyuki is the member of The Imperial Chamber of the Onmyo (皇國陰陽寮) and Reiji's younger sister. She is dissatisfied with her brother's addiction to gambling. She informs Reiji of Nanao's kidnapping by Takei, and makes Reiji decide to help Yako participate in the rescue operation.
Masumi Ayanokōji (綾小路真澄, Ayanokōji Masumi), Kayo Ayanokōji (綾小路香代, Ayanokōji Kayo)
The noble family Ayanokōji's members. Since Kayo's mother comes from the Byakurenji clan, they're also distant relatives of Nanao. Masumi is a soldier belongs to military, and is Shinobu Saionji's older cousin and Kayo's grandson, while Kayo is the countess and the grandmother of both Masumi and Shinobu. Masumi didn't get along well with Yako at first due to the military and Chamber of Onmyo not getting along, but he was impressed by Nanao at the first meeting. As Kayo is attacked by ayakashi during the party and suffers a cursed injury to her leg, she has to be hospitalized for treatment. Nanao accidentally helps Kayo in the hospital, making Masumi and Kayo to start to befriend Nanao, while feeling angry about that Shinobu offends the Benitsubaki clan many times in order to become Yako's wife. They publicly condemn Shinobu's actions when they show up at the tea party, and they're shocked learning of Nanao's experience of being left with a spiritual seal by ayakashi. In the side story of volume 7 of the comic book and volume 2 of the novel, they apologize for the events caused by Shinobu before, and reveal that they're distant relatives of Nanao and the Saionji family are severely punished by the authorities, and decide to continue to support Nanao and wish them happiness.
Reito Byakurenji (白蓮寺 麗人, Byakurenji Reito)
Voiced by: Takuya Eguchi (voice comic)
The next head of the Byakurenji clan. He is skilled at using spells to create barriers and influence others' consciousness, yet is a paranoid cleanliness addict and superstitious person. He was once engaged with Nanao, but he abandoned her due to the spiritual seal on Nanao and his father forced Nanao to wear the enchanted mask with spells which lead to her being ostracized. When the ayakashi attack the family mansion, he is misled by Akemi and mistakes Nanao for desiring to harm his daughter Kotomi (琴美), he slaps Nanao which cause the mask to fall off unexpectedly, making the spell ineffective, his old love for Nanao rekindles. He desires to take Nanao back and even plans the kidnapping incident, but his plan failed, and in the end he becomes crazy due to the rebound spell. He has also been implicated in the Byakurenji clan's long-term crimes. The Byakurenji clan is severely punished and lost its original status and financial resources, and is monitored by the 8th Division of The Imperial Chamber of the Onmyo (皇國陰陽寮) which is station in the clan territory to guard The Five Element Barrier (五行結界). His daughter is the only family member who gets good care by Maria Fujidō, the 8th Division Captain of The Imperial Chamber of the Onmyo (皇國陰陽寮).
Akemi Byakurenji (白蓮寺 曉美, Byakurenji Akemi)
Voiced by: Haruka Tomatsu (voice comic)
Nanao's older cousin. She's the culprit that set Nanao up and caused ayakashi event because she envied Nanao for her engagement with Reito. Akemi later married Reito and abused the maids who serve the Byakurenji's, especially Nanao, while she shrank the responsibility of taking care of her daughter Kotomi (琴美). As Nanao starts a contract marriage with Yako and leaves the Byakurenji clan, Akemi finds out that Reito pays more attention to Nanao. After Reito abandons the marriage with her and Yako induces her to reveal her crime, she is the first to be imprisoned by The Imperial Chamber of the Onmyo (皇國陰陽寮) and then expelled from the village by the Byakurenji clan as the person responsible for the main incident.
Shinobu Saionji (斎園寺 しのぶ, Saionji Shinobu)
Shinobu is Yako's ex-fiancée and the daughter of Duke Saionji, who has been pampered by her father due to her mother's early death since childhood, which led to her selfish and arrogant personality. She couldn't accept the genetic curse constitution of Yako, which led to the breakdown of their political engagement. After that, she was once arranged by Tokiko to enter into a political engagement with Takaya. As ayakashi attack people during the party, Yako accidentally rescues her, she dissolves the engagement between Takaya and her, makes a series of interferences in order to prevent Nanao from being Yako's legal wife and break their bond, going as far at to summon ayakashi in the Imperial Capital with Takei's help to wreak havoc. Once the havoc caused by her and Takei is calmed down, she is arrested for interrogation, but Takei escapes while leaving behind evidence of Shinobu's father's illegal actions before fleeing, which led to the decline of her family. In the side story of volume 7 of the manga and volume 2 of the novel, it is adds that Duke Saionji is imprisoned in a remote island for serving his sentence when he's exposed to secretly planning a plan involving the emperor and plotting to assassinate the current emperor, while Shinobu is sentenced to prison by the authorities for the same crime as her father.
Takei (武井) / Takeru Daidaiin (橙院 武流, Daidaiin Takeru)
A cunning and skilled assassin and human trafficker, he is the illegitimate and fifth son of the former head of the Daidaiin clan, and he's also Hotaru (蛍流)'s twin older brother. Because their mother was the former clan head's mistress, the former clan head's legitimate wife persecuted them. The former clan head's legitimate wife sold their mother to merchants as bait to attract ayakashi, forcing Takeru and Hotaru to live in a secluded mountain hut, relying on each other to survive. Just before Takeru was about to leave his hometown for his studies, he unexpectedly learned that Hotaru had been betrayed by their clan members and used as bait to attract demons. Hotaru were severely injured by ayakashi, and the Great Yokai Gehou (外法) the head of Tengu appeared, taking Takeru and Hotaru. Gehou healed Hotaru as requested but also took her captive due to her high spiritual power, claiming that if Takeru brought a woman with higher spiritual power as an exchange for Hotaru's release.
After leaving his clan, he was hired by Duke Saionji to serve Shinobu and carry out assassinations. In order to seize Nanao, he used Shinobu's jealousy to trigger a dangerous event, but with the failure of the plan, he deliberately left the evidence of Duke Saionji to escape, and colluded with Tokiko to prepare against Nanao and Yako. In order to make a deal with the Great Yokai in exchange for his twin younger sister Hotaru coming back, he doesn't hesitate to kidnap Nanao and prepare her as a bride candidate for the Great Yokai. Unexpectedly, Gehou had no intention of honoring his promise and only returns Hotaru's remains, leading Takeru to turn against Gehou. He flees with Nanao from the pursuit of the Tengu group, and after having the meal Nanao prepared, he understands her will and abilities, changing his stance to help Nanao return to Yako. He agreed to the negotiation terms proposed by Yako, aiding The Imperial Chamber of the Onmyo in opposing Nurarihyon. As desired, he meet with Hotaru's soul through Sara's spellcasting one last time. Later, he apologized to Nanao for his previous actions and offered her blessings during her wedding. Through Himiko's mediation, he avoided the death penalty due to the circumstances that led to his alliance with the Tengu. Following Himiko's arrangement and to fulfill his commitment to atone for his sins, he joined the 5th Division of The Imperial Chamber of the Onmyo.

== Media ==
=== Manga ===
Written by Midori Yūma and illustrated by Mamenosuke Fujimaru, The Ayakashi Hunter's Tainted Bride serialization on Kodansha's Pixiv-based Palcy manga service on May 28, 2023. The manga's chapters have been compiled into twelve tankōbon volumes as of September 2026.

During their panel at Anime Expo 2024, Kodansha USA announced that they had licensed the series for English publication beginning in Q2 2025.

A four-chapter spin-off manga written and illustrated by Akimine Kamijyo and supervised by Yūma, titled Kōkoku no Sōheki, was serialized in Monthly Shōnen Sirius from January 26 to April 24, 2026. Its chapters were compiled into a single tankōbon volume released on May 29, 2026.

A second spin-off manga illustrated by Tsugaru Toba with composition by Sen Izumino, titled Kōtō Onmyō Gakkō, began serialization in the same magazine on May 26, 2026.

No.	Original release date	Original ISBN	North American release date	North American ISBN
1	October 30, 2023	978-4-06-533234-4	March 25, 2025	979-8-88-877347-5
1. "The Girl with the Monkey Mask"; 2. "A Man Named Benitsubaki Yako"; 3. "The Fierce God of the Empire"; 4. "The Tsubaki Demon"; Bonus: "Nanao's Master Yako Observation Diary"
2	January 30, 2024	978-4-06-534232-9	May 27, 2025	979-8-88-877348-2
5. "Nanao Goes to the Capital"; 6. "The Hero of the Capital"; 7. "The White Magnolia Hairpin"; 8. "A Broken Heart"; Bonus: "Yako on What Is Cute About Nanao"
3	April 30, 2024	978-4-06-535208-3	July 29, 2025	979-8-88-877392-5
9. "Before the Storm"; 10. "Spring Thunder"; 11. "Their Love"; 12. "Celebrate a Tainted Marriage"; Bonus: "Nanao's Declaration of Yako's Merits"
4	July 30, 2024	978-4-06-536033-0; 978-4-06-536034-7 (SE)	September 30, 2025	979-8-88-877434-2
13. "Summer Bird"; 14. "Urge"; 15. "Yako's Past"; 16. "Lunchbox Turmoil"; Bonus: "Yako Wants to Give Nanao a Gift"
5	October 30, 2024	978-4-06-537023-0; 978-4-06-537016-2 (SE)	November 11, 2025	979-8-88-877531-8
17. "As Lady Shinobu Pleases"; 18. "Nanao Talks to Her Brother-in-Law"; 19. "The Best Marriage"; 20. "Even If It Wasn't Me"; Bonus: "Yako Cornered by an Aggressive Nanao"
6	January 30, 2025	978-4-06-538075-8; 978-4-06-538114-4 (SE)	January 20, 2026	979-8-88-877583-7
21. "Something I Desire"; 22. "The Stunning Wild Flower"; 23. "The Stain on the Benitsubaki Clan"; 24. "The Captains' Conference"; Bonus: "Yako, Perplexed by Nicknames"
7	April 30, 2025	978-4-06-539085-6; 978-4-06-539014-6 (SE)	August 25, 2026	979-8-88-877645-2
25. "Nanao's Spiritual Energy"; 26. "Nurahiryon's Robe"; 27. "The Heroes' Night Before"; 28. "The Oedo Fireworks Festival"; Bonus: "The Shikigami of the Benitsubaki Family"
8	July 30, 2025	978-4-06-539942-2; 978-4-06-540106-4 (SE)	November 3, 2026	979-8-88-877816-6
9	October 30, 2025	978-4-06-541068-4; 978-4-06-541116-2 (SE)	February 2, 2027	979-8-88-877905-7
10	January 30, 2026	978-4-06-542088-1; 978-4-06-542161-1 (SE)	May 4, 2027	979-8-88-877955-2
11	May 29, 2026	978-4-06-543448-2; 978-4-06-543689-9 (SE)	—	—
12	September 30, 2026	978-4-06-544778-9; 978-4-06-545037-6 (SE)	—	—

==== Sumekuni no Sōheki ====
No.	Original release date	Original ISBN	North American release date	North American ISBN
1	May 29, 2026	978-4-06-543690-5	—	—

=== Novel ===
A novel version began publication under Kodansha's Kodansha Taiga novel imprint on October 13, 2023. Four volumes have been released as of September 15, 2026. Starting from the original manga's concept, the novel version was later created by adapting the manga's script into a full manuscript.

No.	Release date	ISBN
1	October 13, 2023	978-4-06-533519-2
2	August 9, 2024	978-4-06-536487-1
3	July 15, 2026	978-4-06-544185-5
4	September 15, 2026	978-4-06-544880-9

=== Other ===
In commemoration of the release of the manga's second volume on January 30, 2024, a promotional video with narration by Yūichirō Umehara was released that same day.

== Reception ==
By September 2026, the series had over 6.5 million copies in circulation.

The series, alongside I'm Going to Show Them With A Gorgeous Divorce!, won the Isekai Comic Prize at the 2025 Digital Comic Awards. It was nominated for the 49th Kodansha Manga Award in the shōjo category in 2025.

== See also ==
- Kakuriyo: Bed & Breakfast for Spirits, a light novel series also written by Midori Yūma
