= Marginal Prince =

Japanese anime television series

マージナルプリンス-月桂樹の王子達- (Mājinaru Purinsu: Gekkeiju no Ōji-tachi)
- Genre: Drama
- Anime television series
- Directed by: Takayuki Inagaki
- Produced by: Kai Izumi; Mitsuhiro Hata; Ritsuko Inoue; Hideyuki Nanba
- Written by: Ritsuko Hayasaka
- Music by: Yasunori Iwasaki
- Studio: Tokyo Kids; Studio T&B; Gonzo
- Licensed by: Crunchyroll
- Original network: AT-X, Chiba TV, Sun TV, Tokyo MX TV, TV Kanagawa, TV Saitama
- Original run: October 1, 2006 – December 24, 2006
- Episodes: 13

Marginal Prince (マージナルプリンス-月桂樹の王子達-, Mājinaru Purinsu: Gekkeiju no Ōji-tachi; Marginal Prince: Princes of the Laurel) is a Japanese anime television series. The anime is based on Japanese cell phone service NTT DoCoMo's dating simulation game released on August 15, 2005. The anime, directed by Takayuki Inagaki, premiered on both Tokyo MX TV and TV Saitama on October 1, 2006. The anime's 13 episodes were released the same year between said date and December 24. An extra episode was released on July 19, 2007.

Victor Entertainment released seven DVDs for the anime, each containing two episodes of the anime. The first DVD was released on January 25, 2007. The second DVD was released on February 21, 2007. The third DVD was released on March 21, 2007. The fourth DVD was released on April 25, 2007. The fifth DVD was released on May 23, 2007. The sixth DVD was released on June 21, 2007. The final DVD was released on July 19, 2007. Crunchyroll streamed the series.

== Plot ==
Yuuta (ユウタ; voiced by Hisayoshi Suganuma) studied abroad at St. Alfonso's school, an elite boarding school in St. Alfonso, a small island far from Japan. He is confused by its building and the fact it only accepts students who are children of celebrities.

== Media ==
=== Anime ===
Victor Entertainment released seven DVDs for the anime, each containing two episodes of the anime. The first DVD was released on January 25, 2007. The second DVD was released on February 21, 2007. The third DVD was released on March 21, 2007. The fourth DVD was released on April 25, 2007. The fifth DVD was released on May 23, 2007. The sixth DVD was released on June 21, 2007. The final DVD was released on July 19, 2007. Crunchyroll streamed the series.

| No. | Title | Original release date |
|---|---|---|
| 1 | "The Jade Escuela"; Transliteration: "Suiryoku no Esukuera" (Japanese: 翠緑のエスクエラ) | October 1, 2006 |
| 2 | "Edelstein Before Dawn"; Transliteration: "Akatsuki no Ēderushutain" (Japanese: 暁のエーデルシュタイン) | October 8, 2006 |
| 3 | "The Illusion of Ipse"; Transliteration: "Genzō no Ipuse" (Japanese: 幻像のイプセ) | October 15, 2006 |
| 4 | "Vorspiel of the Sun"; Transliteration: "Yōkō no Foashupīru" (Japanese: 陽光のフォアシュピール) | October 22, 2006 |
| 5 | "Pure White Memoria"; Transliteration: "Junpaku no Memoria" (Japanese: 純白のメモリア) | October 29, 2006 |
| 6 | "Glorious Anniversaire"; Transliteration: "Senkō no Aniverusēru" (Japanese: 閃光のアニヴェルセール) | November 5, 2006 |
| 7 | "Triffles on the Sea Breeze"; Transliteration: "Umikaze no Toraifurusu" (Japanese: 海風のトライフルス) | November 12, 2006 |
| 8 | "A Deep Maze"; Transliteration: "Shin'en no Meizu" (Japanese: 深遠のメイズ) | November 19, 2006 |
| 9 | "A Stormy Etranger"; Transliteration: "Arashi no Etoranze" (Japanese: 嵐のエトランゼ) | November 26, 2006 |
| 10 | "The High and Mighty Tristitia"; Transliteration: "Kokō no Torisuteitia" (Japanese: 孤高のトリスティティア) | December 3, 2006 |
| 11 | "Passionate Trovare"; Transliteration: "Jōnetsu no Torovāre" (Japanese: 情熱のトロヴァーレ) | December 10, 2006 |
| 12 | "Empezar, the One Who Offers"; Transliteration: "Shukusai no Enpesāru" (Japanese: 祝祭のエンペサール) | December 17, 2006 |
| 13 | "Rousing Applause"; Transliteration: "Kenran no Apurōsu" (Japanese: 絢爛のアプロース) | December 24, 2006 |
| Extra | "Tokyo Merry-go-land"; Transliteration: "Tokyo Merīgōrando" (Japanese: Tokyoメリーゴーランド) | July 19, 2007 |

=== Game CDs ===
Serendipity released three game music CDs. The first two CDs, Marginal Prince Songs 1 and Marginal Prince Songs 2, were both released on September 1, 2005. Both CDs were sung by Shun Someya, Ryotaro Okiayu, and Hisayoshi Suganuma. The final CD, Marginal Prince Songs 2.1 – Stanislav Sokurov, was released on January 22, 2006.

=== Drama CD ===
Serendipity released a drama CD, called Yuta Gakuin Tochaku-hen, for the anime on September 15, 2006.
