= Hero of Robots =

- Developer: International Games System
- Publishers: JP: International Games System (IGS); AS: International Games System (IGS); WW: SNK
- Platform: Arcade
- Release: 2011
- Genres: Hybrid collectible card and arcade video game
- Mode: Up to 2 players simultaneously

Hero of Robots is a Taiwanese trading card arcade game developed by International Games System and published by SNK that debuted in 2011.

== Gameplay ==
Hero of Robots is a hybrid arcade game similar to Mushiking. When the new card is obtained, the game starts. Each player must scan three types of cards: Robot, Power, and Skill. Before the battle starts, players will first have to pull the lever in order to get the chance to attack first. The attacking player must choose which type of attack to use, melee or shooting, while the defending player must predict which attack type the opponent will be using, anti-melee or anti-shooting. If the attack and defense are of the same type, the defending player takes minimal damage, but if the attack and defense are of different types, the attacking player deals full damage. Each successful attack or defense grants the player energy, which will be used to launch "level up" or "super level up" option on robot's moves once a sufficient amount of energy has been accumulated, but some robots have ability to "transform" or "merge" if the energy bar fueled. To activate these abilities, the players must pull down the lever, then insert the battle passwords within a limited time. The player can win the battle by a knockout, i.e. causing the opponent's HP to go down to zero. The battle also ends when five rounds have elapsed, in which case the winner is determined by the amount of HP remaining for each player.

== Media ==
=== Manga ===
In 2013, a Hero Of Robots comic storyline was published early. It detailed the origins about the mechanical sentient alien robots, their journey to Earth and their search for chosen human partners as their pilots. The series starts with Jet, a young boy who dreams of becoming a martial arts master in future. Jet was close friend of Niel (the pilot of Odin mecha), Gajill (the pilot of Black Tortoise mecha), and Chris (the pilot of Black Jack mecha). He later made a friendship with Addiso after they understand each other at the end of Episode 02. It follows the stories from Episode 01 to Episode 05 [End Part] of the arcade game.

A manga series by Wei Cheng and Hao Mian titled Hero of Robots FIGHT (Traditional Chinese: 機甲英雄FIGHT, Pe̍h-oē-jī: Jījiǎ Yīngxióng FIGHT, literally: "Mech Hero FIGHT"), was serialized in the Taiwanese version of CoroCoro Comic published by Chingwin Publishing Group between 2012 and 2014. The collected releases of the manga included bonus cards, and an anime graphic card that can be used in the arcade game machine.

=== Anime ===
International Games System collaborated with Nada Holdings and Japanese broadcaster TV Tokyo to produce an anime adaptation of the arcade game. Tetsurō Amino is the director, with Takayuki Yanase as the mecha designer and Noboru Nakayama as animation director.

The four-episode anime was streamed in Taiwan on Bahamut Anime between August 16 and September 27, 2019. The series is produced by Gonzo and written by Touko Machida.

=== Music ===
The Hero of Robots theme song "Hero Spirits", introduced in the arcade game's third set, was composed and performed by SHISUI and AKASAKI. It was later reused again as an opening theme for anime adaptation.

The second "Hero of Robots" theme song "《機甲英雄》動畫OP主題曲 完整版" was introduced in second season set. The song was used for anime version, and copyrighted by Avex Inc.

== Other games ==
A spin-off arcade game, interchangeably known in English as Hero of Robots: Transform and Hero of Robots: Go! (Traditional Chinese: 機甲英雄變身GO, Pe̍h-oē-jī: Jījiǎ Yīngxióng Biàn Shēn GO, literally: "Mech Hero Transform GO") was released in 2017. It uses motion sensing Kinect technology for game play. Players receive physical bonus cards that can be used in the main game and in an augmented reality application for Android and iOS devices.

A sequel which doesn't connect to the original game timelines, also called Hero of Robots: Brave Legacy (Traditional Chinese: 機甲英雄 機鬥勇者, Pe̍h-oē-jī: Jījiǎ Yīngxióng Jī Dòu Yǒngzhě, literally: "Mech Hero Fighter") launched in Taiwan in late 2018.
