= Space Battleship Tiramisu =

Japanese manga and anime series

- The cover of the first volume, featuring the character Subaru Ichinose.

宇宙戦艦ティラミス (Uchū Senkan Tiramisu)
- Genre: Science fiction comedy
- Manga
- Written by: Satoshi Miyakawa
- Illustrated by: Kei Itō
- Published by: Shinchosha
- Imprint: Bunch Comics
- Magazine: Kurage Bunch
- Original run: October 9, 2015 – February 28, 2020
- Volumes: 10
- Anime television series
- Directed by: Hiroshi Ikehata
- Produced by: Mariko Chiya; Toyokazu Nakahigashi; Toshiyuki Miichi; Tomohiro Ōtani; Chizuru Doi; Hiroyasu Taniguchi; Seiji Andō; Yao Xin; Hirotaka Kaneko; Kōhei Nagaoka
- Written by: Yū Satō
- Music by: Shunpei Ishige
- Studio: Gonzo
- Licensed by: Crunchyroll (Note: In North America through Crunchyroll, LLC (formerly known as Funimation).)
- Original network: Tokyo MX, Sun TV, BS11, AT-X
- Original run: April 3, 2018 – December 25, 2018
- Episodes: 26 + 7 OVA

Space Battleship Tiramisu (Japanese: 宇宙戦艦ティラミス, Hepburn: Uchū Senkan Tiramisu) is a Japanese manga series written by Satoshi Miyakawa and illustrated by Kei Itō. An anime television series adaptation by Gonzo was broadcast from April 3 to December 25, 2018.

== Plot ==
The series is a comedy about the daily life of Subaru Ichinose, a pilot on the space battleship Tiramisu, who lives and eats in his fighter's cockpit because he can't stand the company of others.

== Characters ==
Subaru Ichinose (スバル・イチノセ, Subaru Ichinose)
Voiced by: Kaito Ishikawa (Japanese); Anthony Bowling (English)
Isuzu Ichinose (イスズ・イチノセ, Isuzu Ichinose)
Voiced by: Takahiro Sakurai (Japanese); Kyle Phillips (English)
Vulgar Hummer (ヴォルガー・ハマー, Vorugā Hamā)
Voiced by: Junichi Suwabe (Japanese); Jeremy Inman (English)
Subaru-B/Subaru-Beyond (スバルB / スバル - ビヨンド, Subaru B/Subaru Biyondo)
Voiced by: Takuya Eguchi (Japanese); Ricco Fajardo (English)
Escalade Cadillac (エスカレド・キャデラック, Esukaredo Kyaderakku)
Voiced by: Shūichi Ikeda
Sōichirō Ichinose (ソウイチロウ・イチノセ, Sōichirō Ichinose)
Voiced by: Rikiya Koyama (Japanese); Patric Carroll (English)
Venturi Leroy (ヴェンチュリー・ルロワ, Venchurī Rurowa)
Voiced by: Takaya Hashi (Japanese); Andy Mullins (English)
Ligier Leroy (リージュ・ルロワ, Rīju Rurowa)
Voiced by: Aya Endō (Japanese); Leah Clark (English)
Shingeruko Honda (シゲルコ・ホンダ, Shigeruko Honda)
Voiced by: Satomi Arai (Japanese); Jamie Marchi (English)
Pubic Hair (陰毛, Inmō)
Voiced by: Jouji Nakata
PAC2-AR (パッカー, Pakkā)
Voiced by: Haruko Momoi (Japanese); Tia Ballard (English)
Maybach Wilhelm (マイバッハ・ヴィルヘルム, Maibahha Vuiruherumu)
Voiced by: Tomokazu Sugita (Japanese); Cris George (English)
Leblanc Spyri (ルブラン・スピリ, Ruburan Supiri)
Voiced by: Aya Hisakawa (Japanese); Beth Lipton (English)
Fei Callaway (フェイ・キャラウェイ, Fei Kyarauei)
Voiced by: Megumi Han (Japanese); Julie Shields (English)
Romeo Alfa (ロメオ・アルファ, Romeo Arufa)
Voiced by: Yusuke Shirai (Japanese); Aaron Dismuke (English)
Narrator
Voiced by: Akio Otsuka (Japanese); Brian Mathis (English)

== Media ==
=== Manga ===
Satoshi Miyakawa launched the manga, with art by Kei Itō, on Shinchosha's Kurage Bunch website on October 9, 2015. On January 18, 2020, it was announced the manga would end in three chapters. The series ended on February 28, 2020.

==== Volumes ====
No.	Japanese release date	Japanese ISBN
1	May 9, 2016	978-4-10-771891-4
1. "FLY IN SPACE"; 2. "NAKED DANCE"; 3. "MY CUTE PUPPY"; 4. "DO NOT DISTURB"; 5. "BLUNESS"; 6. "THE LAST VOLUME"; 7. "I'M NOT ALONE"; 8. "HOLY NIGHT SCRAMBLE"; 9. "STAND IN THE UNIVERSE"; 10. "DRIFTING WITHOUT SIDE DISHES"; 11. "DIM MEMORY"
2	October 8, 2016	978-4-10-771922-5
12. "LOST MEMORY"; 13. "TRAGEDY IN THE LIQUID ROOM"; 14. "SMALL SCRATCH"; 15. "DOMO ARIGATO MR.ROBOT"; 16. "RETURN OF THE ACE PILOT"; 17. "A FRIEND OF MINE"; 18. "BLACK IMPULSE"; 19. "I'M A SPEED KING"; 20. "NON-FICTION"; 21. "MAN'S WORLD"; 22. "ATMOSPHERIC REENTRY"; 23. "TO EARTH"
3	April 8, 2017	978-4-10-771969-0
24. "COCKPIT ADDICTION"; 25. "IT FALLS INTO THE CHRYSLER"; 26. "REUNION"; 27. "NEO UNIVERSE…"; 28. "FREEZE!"; 29. "AI"; 30. "HER UPPER BODY AND HIS LOWER BODY"; 31. "I'M IN HER HANDS"; 32. "EYES OF THE HERO"; 33. "BUT THERE WAS A GIMLET"; 34. "GRIM REAPER DANCING"; 35. "BROTHERS"
4	September 8, 2017	978-4-10-772008-5
36. "IN NO WAY"; 37. "BEYOND THE ORIGIN"; 38. "URBAN WARFARE"; 39. "PLUG-IN KERUKEION II"; 40. "GOD SAID"; 41. "DIFFERENT FUTURE"; 42. "REUNION WITH CHIBI"; 43. "JIKAN YO TOMARE"; 44. "THE NEW RECORD(S)"; 45. "DURANDAL RIZER"; 46. "ON THE OTHER SIDE OF THE STONE MONUMENT"
5	March 9, 2018	978-4-10-772059-7
47. "DICTATOR CADILLAC"; 48. "INTENTION OF THE COCKPIT, WHICH IS SPREAD"; 49. "GHOST IN THE COCKPIT"; 50. "LOVE OF FATHER"; 51. "I'M A BEAST"; 52. "A SIGN OF DEATH"; 53. "(THERE IS)NO SPACE"; Ex: "NASTY MORNING"; 54. "CHEF OF THE BATTLEFIELD"; 55. "TEARS OF THE DESERT"; 56. "GET OUT OF ROMEO'S BODY"; 57. "TEMPORARY ESCAPE"
6	July 9, 2018	978-4-10-772099-3
58. "VOYAGE OF DEATH UNIVERSE"; 59. "FIRST COME, FIRST SERVED"; 60. "AFTER US THE SAVAGE GOD"; 61. "CONNECT THE FATE AND DESTINY"; 62. "THE MAN IN THE IRON MASK"
7	October 9, 2018	978-4-10-772125-9
8	April 9, 2019	978-4-10-772175-4
9	October 10, 2019	978-4-10-772221-8
10	April 9, 2020	978-4-10-772274-4

=== Anime ===
An anime television series adaptation premiered on April 3, 2018, (Note: The series is listed for an April 2, 2018 premiere starting at 25:00, which is the same as April 3 at 1 AM.) and was broadcast on Tokyo MX, Sun TV, BS11, and AT-X, before streaming on Hikari TV Channel. The series is twenty-six episodes long and also has seven OVAs. The series is directed by Hiroshi Ikehata and written by Yū Satō, with animation by studio Gonzo. Ai Yokoyama provides character designs for the anime. Kaito Ishikawa (the voice actor for Subaru) performs both the opening theme song "Breakthrough" and the ending theme song "DURANDAL" for the first season. Crunchyroll is simulcasting the series while Funimation has licensed the series and streams it with an English dub.

At the conclusion of the first season broadcast, a second season was announced and aired from October 2 to December 25, 2018. (Note: The tv network it lists the show at 25:00 on October 1, which is at October 2, 2018 at 1:00 a.m.) Kaito Ishikawa returned to perform both the opening theme song "Gravity Heart" and the ending theme song "DURANDAL New ver." for the second season.

==== Season 1 ====
No.	English title (Note: All English titles are taken from Crunchyroll.) Original Japanese title	Original release date
1	"FLY IN SPACE"	April 3, 2018
1	"NAKED DANCE"	April 3, 2018
2	"MY CUTE PUPPY"	April 10, 2018
2	"DO NOT DISTURB"	April 10, 2018
3	"BLUENESS"	April 17, 2018
3	"THE LAST VOLUME"	April 17, 2018
4	"STAND IN THE UNIVERSE"	April 24, 2018
4	"I'M NOT ALONE"	April 24, 2018
5	"DRIFTING WITHOUT SIDE DISHES"	May 1, 2018
6	"HOLY NIGHT SCRAMBLE"	May 8, 2018
6	"DIM MEMORY"	May 8, 2018
7	"LOST MEMORY"	May 15, 2018
7	"TRAGEDY IN THE LIQUID ROOM"	May 15, 2018
8	"SMALL SCRATCH"	May 22, 2018
8	"HELLO MR. ROBOT"	May 22, 2018
9	"RETURN OF THE ACE PILOT"	May 29, 2018
9	"A FRIEND OF MINE"	May 29, 2018
10	"BLACK IMPULSE"	June 5, 2018
10	"SUBARU, THE SPEED KING"	June 5, 2018
11	"NON-FICTION"	June 12, 2018
11	"REUNION WITH CHIBI"	June 12, 2018
12	"MAN'S WORLD"	June 19, 2018
13	"ATMOSPHERIC REENTRY"	June 26, 2018
13	"TO EARTH"	June 26, 2018

==== Season 2 (Zwei) ====
No.	English title (Note: All English titles are taken from Crunchyroll.) Original Japanese title	Original release date
1	"COCKPIT ADDICTION"	October 2, 2018
1	"IT FALLS INTO THE CHRYSLER"	October 2, 2018
2	"REUNION"	October 9, 2018
2	"NEO UNIVERSE..."	October 9, 2018
3	"FREEZE!"	October 16, 2018
3	"EYES OF THE HERO"	October 16, 2018
4	"BUT THERE WAS A GIMLET"	October 23, 2018
4	"AI"	October 23, 2018
5	"GRIM REAPER DANCING"	October 30, 2018
5	"BROTHERS"	October 30, 2018
6	"IN NO WAY"	November 6, 2018
6	"BEYOND THE ORIGIN"	November 6, 2018
7	"URBAN WARFARE"	November 13, 2018
7	"GOD SAID"	November 13, 2018
8	"DIFFERENT FUTURE"	November 20, 2018
8	"JIKAN YO TOMARE"	November 20, 2018
9	"THE NEW RECORD(S)"	November 27, 2018
9	"GHOST IN THE COCKPIT"	November 27, 2018
10	"ON THE OTHER SIDE OF THE STONE MONUMENT"	December 4, 2018
10	"DICTATOR CADILLAC"	December 4, 2018
11	"DURANDAL RISER"	December 11, 2018
11	"PLUG-IN KERUKEION II"	December 11, 2018
12	"BATTLE OF THE HEKATONKHEIRES PART I"	December 18, 2018
13	"BATTLE OF THE HEKATONKHEIRES PART II"	December 25, 2018

=== Stage play ===
The first stage play was performed in July–August 2018 in Tokyo and Osaka (Tokyo July 25–31 Theater Sun Mall, Osaka August 11–12 ABC Hall).

The second stage play - "Space Battleship Tiramisu II Crab, Can You Make It Yourself?" was performed December 2019-January 2020 in Osaka and Tokyo (Osaka December 27–29, 2019 IMP Hall, Tokyo January 8, 2020 Sun-19th Club eX).

In October 2022, the third stage play - "Space Battleship Tiramisu-I'm going to a red-light district on the Galaxy Train-" was performed in Tokyo (October 7–16, 2022, Kokumin Kyosai coop Hall/Space Zero).

In September 2023, the final one - "Space Battleship Tiramisu Final Chapter ~ Final Last is the End ~" will be performed in Gifu and Tokyo.

Character	Cast
Subaru Ichinose	Kentaro Menjo
Isuzu Ichinose	Gaku Takamoto
Vulgar Hummer	Yusuke Ueda
Subaru-B	Kotaro Ito
Ligier Leroy	Kaede Fujimoto/Arisa Deguchi
Soichiro Ichinose	Ryuko Isogai
Romeo Alfa	Nobunaga Sato
