= Gravion =

Japanese anime television series

超重神グラヴィオン (Chōjūshin Guravion)
- Genre: Comedy, harem, mecha
- Created by: Masami Ōbari; Kazumitsu Akamatsu; Gonzo
- Anime television series
- Directed by: Masami Ōbari
- Written by: Fumihiko Shimo
- Music by: Masumi Itō
- Studio: Gonzo
- Licensed by: Crunchyroll (Note: In North America through Crunchyroll, LLC (formerly known as Funimation).); NA: ADV Films (expired); UK: A.D. Vision
- Original network: FNS (Fuji TV)
- English network: US: Anime Network, Crunchyroll Channel
- Original run: October 7, 2002 – December 16, 2002
- Episodes: 13
- Anime television series

Gravion Zwei
- Directed by: Masami Ōbari
- Written by: Fumihiko Shimo
- Music by: Masumi Itō
- Studio: Gonzo
- Licensed by: Crunchyroll
- Original network: JAITS, Kids Station
- English network: US: Anime Network
- Original run: January 8, 2004 – March 25, 2004
- Episodes: 12

Gravion (超重神グラヴィオン, Chōjūshin Guravion; lit. Super Heavyweight God Gravion) is a Japanese anime television series produced by Gonzo. It aired in Japan from October 7, 2002, to December 16, 2002, and ran for 13 episodes. In 2004, Gravion Zwei (超重神グラヴィオンZwei, Chōjūshin Guravion Tsuvai) ("Zwei" is German for "two") was released and aired from January 8 to March 25 in Japan, running for twelve additional episodes, answering the questions generated from the first series.

Both Gravion and Gravion Zwei were created and directed by Masami Ōbari with mecha designs from Kunio Okawara. Both series were released in North America by ADV Films. After ADV Films lost the rights to the series, the series was re-licensed by Funimation (now Crunchyroll, LLC).

== Plot ==
In Gravion, Eiji Shigure is sent a letter from his missing older sister Ayaka Shigure. Responding to its message, his search for her leads him to the mysterious billionaire Klein Sandman, and Eiji secretly infiltrates his enormous Saint-Germain Castle while he is hosting a party for Earth Federation Alliance (EFA) leaders, in order to find her. He ends up piloting the G-Attacker, a vehicle that is one of a group of five, called Gran Divas, that were secretly created by Sandman himself, during a mission of Sandman's Earthgertz team to defeat the invading mechanical extraterrestrials called the Zeravire. Sandman explains to Eiji that his unique G-Factor allows him to pilot machines such as the G-Attacker and his sister, who also had the G-Factor, was secretly part of Earthgertz. When she disappeared on a mission, Sandman was forced to send the letter to Eiji to bring him there in order to recruit him onto the team. Although only interested in finding his sister, Eiji becomes part of Earthgertz, who are the planet's only defensive team able to prevent the Zeravire from destroying humanity, by combining the Gran Divas with the Gran Kaiser mecha to form the titular super robot, Gravion.

In Gravion Zwei, the Zeravire invasion seems to have stopped. However, when it rises back up all of a sudden, the Earthgertz and its trump card Gravion, is needed to defend the Earth again. In the meantime, the EFA creates their own weapons to counter the Zeravire, the Gran Trooper. As they attempt to fend off the Zeravire, the Earthgertz and the EFA must set aside their differences, confront their pasts and unveil the mysteries of the Zeravire, in order to end their impending threat once and for all.

== Characters ==
=== Eiji Shigure ===
Protagonist of the series, 17-year-old Eiji Shigure (紅 エイジ, Shigure Eiji) is searching for his older sister Ayaka Shigure, after he receives a letter from her. Upon finding information she is last seen in service to billionaire Klein Sandman, Eiji enters Sandman's Saint-Germain Castle to find her, but is unknowingly recruited into the Earthgertz as pilot of the Gran Diva, the G-Attacker. He reluctantly stays with the Earthgertz to assume piloting responsibilities, but above all, will leave once he finds Ayaka in Sandman's castle. In Gravion Zwei, he pilots the Geo Mirage.

Easily angered, Eiji carries a short temper (which makes him quite easy to manipulate) and is annoyed by the carefree and clueless Toga, the other boy in the castle, who has no outside interaction prior to Eiji's arrival, or the feisty Luna, who picks on him for not being more like Toga. Regardless, Eiji is reasonable in his rash decisions and develops a close friendship with the rest of his teammates, knowing firsthand how real the Zeravire threat is, thus willing to see the menacing mechanical beings stopped by helping the Earthgertz in their mission. Voiced by: Kenichi Suzumura (Japanese); Chris Patton (English)

=== Luna Gusuku ===
An energetic, friendly 14-year-old girl, Luna Gusuku (城 琉菜, Gusuku Runa) teases Eiji for her amusement and befuddles him for not being as straight and decent like Touga. One of two pilots of the G-Driller Gran Diva and born in Okinawa, she came to Klein Sandman's castle at a young age, meeting Toga Tenkuuji first. Her father Isana Gusuku disappears while working for the billionaire, and has since stayed in Sandman's castle, eventually enrolling into the Earthgertz. In Gravion Zwei, she pilots the Geo Javelin. Voiced by: Haruna Ikezawa (Japanese); Luci Christian (English)

=== Touga Tenkuuji ===
The only other boy in Klein Sandman's castle, 17-year-old Touga Tenkuuji (天空侍 斗牙, Tenkuuji Touga) is a very kind and gentle person with a smile almost always on his face. Toga claims he has been inside the castle all his life, never knowing any other human interaction besides the Earthgertz and Sandman's countless maids. Extremely athletic and physically strong, he is the pilot of the Gran Kaiser, the robot that combines with the four Gran Divas to form the Gravion.

Touga has one of the highest G-Factors among the Earthgertz, thus is capable of withstanding the pressures of piloting the Gran Kaiser. It is Sandman's wish that Touga's interaction with Eiji Shigure will help him develop his human side, and though Toga learns more of the environment outside the castle, his views are simplistic and childish in nature, such as putting victory over the Zeravire first above conserving human life, something which Eiji does not approve Touga of.

Originally an orphan, Touga was raised at an orphanage sponsored by Sandman. Frequently bullied by some of the other children, another orphan was there to help him through his time at the orphanage, until Sandman adopted him and took him to Saint-Germain Castle. Voiced by: Jun Fukuyama (Japanese); Greg Ayres (English)

=== Eina ===
One of the many maids working in Klein Sandman's castle, Eina treats all members of Earthgertz and the other maids well. Easily frightened, Eina finds simple arguments harsh and battles against the Zeravire to be unbearable, but does her best in her piloting duties as the second driver of the G-Driller. She has cared and looked after Touga Tenkuuji since his arrival into Klein Sandman's Saint-Germain Castle. In Gravion Zwei, she pilots the Geo Javelin alongside Luna Gusuku.

In Gravion Zwei, Eina reveals herself as one of Sandman's Proto Gran Divas. It took Sandman nearly 50 years to create her current, artificial body. After she is destroyed following a Zeravire attack, her memories are immediately transferred to her original body, located inside the Sol Σ Gravion, stored on the moon. Voiced by: Mai Nakahara (Japanese); Jessica Boone (English)

=== Mizuki Tachibana ===
The only female adult member of Earthgertz, the 22-year-old busty Mizuki Tachibana (ミヅキ・立花) is the pilot of the Gran Diva, the G-Striker, who loves her alcohol, but is also the most rational member among her teammates. A skilled hacker, she looks up to Ayaka Shigure when she first arrived at Klein Sandman's castle and claims Ayaka as her best friend, though is still in question at her sudden disappearance. In Gravion Zwei, she pilots the Geo Stinger.

Her name is actually an alias; in Gravion Zwei, she reveals herself as a sleeper agent, working for the EFA intelligence division. Her rank in the EFA is lieutenant. Upon stealing development data on the Gravion, she returns to her superiors, in order to provide them the means to counter the Zeravire threat. For her services, she is given a lush, island estate, but returns to the Earthgertz shortly, citing boredom as her primary reason. Her birthday is revealed to be October 12. Faye Xin Lu refers to her as Big Sister in Episode 6 of the second season. Voiced by: Yu Asakawa (Japanese); Kira Vincent-Davis (English)

=== Leele Zeravire ===
A shy girl who lives isolated within the castle's south tower, Leele claims her parents died in a fire years ago. She has no memories following the accident, which has left her traumatized and the sight of raging blue flames easily puts Leele into an extremely frightened state. Raised by Klein Sandman, she secludes herself from others, but opens up to her fellow Earthgertz teammates when they realize she is the pilot of the G-Shadow Gran Diva. Leele is occasionally seen with her pet ferret Lolotte. In Gravion Zwei, she pilots the Geo Caliber.

Leele's full name is Leele Zeravire, the daughter of Zieg Zeravire and Lufira Zeravire. Before her home planet of Llambias was destroyed, thus the origin of her lost memories, she was placed in a stasis capsule and sent by her uncle Hugi Zeraire into space, following the signal of her father's vessel. Her escape ship failed to enter warp travel, thus arrived on Earth at a later time, yet her own subjective time was different, thus she only aged a few months. Sandman finds her and takes her into Saint-Germain Castle. Voiced by: Houko Kuwashima (Japanese); Allison Keith (English)

=== Raven / Ayaka Shigure ===
An enigmatic, masked man who works for Klein Sandman, Raven is completely loyal to his master, never sharing any personal information about himself. Raven oversees the Earthgertz's training, combat simulations and attack situations against the Zeravire, and occasionally answers to the EFA about Sandman's involvement in the extraterrestrials' invasion, in place of Sandman himself.

In Gravion Zwei, it is revealed the current Raven is actually Ayaka Shigure, Eiji Shigure's sister. The mask holds the memories of the original Raven, a former colleague of Zieg Zeravire on his homeworld of Llambias. The previous holder of Raven's mask was Luna Gusuku's father Isana, before he passed it down to Ayaka.

Ayaka in disguise as Raven often acts overcorrect and strict which leads to many gags in the scenes where Raven appears, so despite Raven's serious attitude 'his' role often comes along with a comical purpose which displeases Raven each time. Another running gag involving Raven is that 'he' secretly desires to get a day off and acts jealously when their teammates are on mission which appear to be more like fooling around like it was their day off such as when the Earthgartz group goes to an amusement park in the third episode of the second season.

As Raven: Voiced by: Hikaru Midorikawa (Japanese); Vic Mignogna (English)
As Ayaka Shigure: Voiced by: Michiko Neya (Japanese); Kimberly Prause (English)

=== Klein Sandman ===
The handsome, billionaire businessman and commander of the Earthgertz, Klein Sandman's knowledge of science and technology allows him to build the Gran Divas and the Gran Kaiser to battle the Zeravire. Sandman selects people with a high tolerance on the effects of gravity, a genetically inherited trait he calls the G-Factor, to become the pilots of his machines. When it seems the Zeravire are too much to handle for Earthgertz, Sandman approves of combining the Gran Divas and the Gran Kaiser into Gravion. In Gravion Zwei, he pilots the Gran Sigma.

Sandman was originally Zieg Zeravire, a scientist from the ecologically devastated planet of Llambias and the husband to Lufira Zeravire. In order to stop further contamination and to prevent an all-out war between the neighboring world of Selias, due to Llambians forcing themselves to immigrate there, Sandman creates the Genesis Machine Gran Sigma, the prototype to the Gran Kaiser, in hopes of restoring Llambias' environment. Unfortunately, his brother-in-law Hugi Zeravire creates the Genocidron System, an automatic, robotic network programmed for extermination. He intended to use it on the Selians, as a means to spare enough Llambians if war was to occur, but Sandman did not wish to see lives sacrificed. Following a brief struggle with Hugi, he accidentally destroys the control device to the Genocidron System, making the machines indiscriminately destroying both worlds.

Upon escaping Llambias, Sandman and Raven flee to Earth. In order to conceal his identity, he takes the name and appearance of the actual Klein Sandman, an 18th-century aristocrat. To provide himself the means to prepare for the Zeravire, Sandman genetically suppresses his own G-Factor, giving him immortality and turning his hair purple from its original blond. Some time before Eiji's arrival at Saint-Germain Castle, a spacecraft lands on Earth that followed his escaping vessel, carrying his daughter, Leele Zeravire. Sandman never knew of her survival until then.

Klein Sandman makes an appearance in Juusou Kikou Dancouga Nova, which is also directed by Masami Obari. Voiced by: Sho Hayami (Japanese); Jason Douglas (English)

=== Faye Xin Lu ===
Appearing in Gravion Zwei, Faye Xin Lu is captain of the G-Soldiers squadron in the EFA military. Very serious and committed to her line of duty, she was an orphan at the same orphanage sponsored by Sandman, meeting Toga Tenkuji for the first time, protecting him from frequent bullies. In fact, Faye was initially selected to be trained as the pilot of the Gran Kaiser, for she had a similar, if not, higher G-Factor than Toga, but Sandman made a last-minute decision and selected him, instead. This last-minute switch leaves Faye feeling embittered towards both Toga and Sandman, causing her to attempt to surpass Toga and even at one point take advantage of his fragile mental state. However, upon being saved by Sol Gravion, she reconsiders and dismisses her grudge. She pilots Grantrooper Unit 1, armed with the Graviton Rang weapon based on God Gravion's Graviton Crescent. It can also draw energy from the other four units for its Graviton Lightning Detonator, based on the Graviton Arc. She refers to Mizuki as Big Sister. Voiced by: Saeko Chiba (Japanese); Stephanie Nadolny (English)

== Anime ==
Gonzo has released three volumes, both on DVD and VHS. Studio Half Eye released a special Ultimate Gravion Toy for the Saishou Henkei line for promoting the series in Japan, while Yamato released GNU-DOU God Gravion and GN-U Gran Kaiser figures in December 2008.

The individual Japanese DVD releases for the first series also had special limited editions. Each volume came with a figure of the respective front cover's character for that DVD for a total of six figures (covering each of the main Gravion pilots in their pilot suits). In addition each figure also had some parts for the God Gravion which could be completed if all the six limited edition DVDs with their corresponding figures were bought by the consumer.

Both Gravion and Gravion Zwei are included as entries in Super Robot Wars Z from the series of video games called Super Robot Wars for the PlayStation 2. Gravion Zwei is also included in the latest two-part game, The 2nd Super Robot Wars Z for the PlayStation Portable, making an appearance in both Hakai-Hen (Break the World Chapter) and Saisei-Hen (Rebirth Chapter).

== Songs ==
=== First Season ===
- Opening: "Nageki no Rosario" by JAM Project
- Combination Insert: "Gasshin! God Gravion!" by JAM Project feat. Masaaki Endo (Japanese); The Singing Maids (Ena (Mai Nakahara / Jessica Boone), Luna Gusuku (Haruna Ikezawa / Luci Christian), Thoria (Haruko Momoi / Tiffany Grant), Brigitta (Rie Kugimiya / Cynthia Martinez), Yumi (Naomi Orikasa / Nancy Novotny), Marinia (Nana Mizuki / Monica Rial) and Tulie (Mikako Takahashi / Tiffany Terrell)) with Klein Sandman (Sho Hayami / Jason Douglas) (Japanese and English; Zwei Episode 3 only)
- Insert: "KISS ME" by Yuria
- Ending: "WISH" by Yuria

=== Second Season ===
- Opening: "Kurenai no Kiba" by JAM Project
- Combination Insert: "Enno Gasshin! Soul Gravion!" by JAM Project feat. Yoshiki Fukuyama
- Ending: "La♪La♪Bye" by Honey Bee
