= Gonzo (company) =

Japanese animation studio

GONZO KK

- Headquarters in Suginami, Tokyo
- Native name: 株式会社ゴンゾ
- Romanized name: Kabushiki-gaisha Gonzo
- Type: Private
- Industry: Animation studio, planning and production
- Founded: February 22, 2000; 26 years ago
- Founder: Mahiro Maeda; Shinji Higuchi; Shouji Murahama; Hiroshi Yamaguchi
- Headquarters: Ogikubo, Suginami, Tokyo, Japan
- Key people: Shinichiro Ishikawa (President and CEO)
- Number of employees: 12 (as of August 1, 2019)
- Subsidiaries: Gonzino; Okinawa Gonzo (2012–2019); NXM Japan
- Website: gonzo.co.jp

Gonzo K.K. (Japanese: 株式会社ゴンゾ, Hepburn: Kabushiki-gaisha Gonzo) (formerly GDH K.K.) is a Japanese animation studio that was established on February 22, 2000. Gonzo is a member of The Association of Japanese Animations. The company's predecessor Gonzo Inc. was established on February 11, 1992, by former Gainax staff members, but was later absorbed into its parent company, GDH K.K. on April 1, 2009, and it would assume the Gonzo trade name for itself.

Recently, on top of producing the studio's most recent works of Phantasy Star Online 2: Episode Oracle as well as a second season of Kakuriyo: Bed & Breakfast for Spirits, the company has been focusing on the NFT market with its projects Samurai Cryptos and Samurai Religion, as well as co-distributing the animated film They Shot the Piano Player in Japan.

== History ==
=== Founding ===
In 1992, Shouji Murahama, a producer who had left Gainax, together with director Mahiro Maeda, screenwriter Hiroshi Yamaguchi, and filmmaker Shinji Higuchi, started Gonzo as a creator's office in Shinjuku, Tokyo. On September 11 of that same year, Shouji Murahama would establish Gonzo Inc. The company's name was suggested by Shinji Higuchi taken from American journalist Hunter S. Thompson's nickname, "Gonzo". He later learned that it also meant "idiot" in Italian.

In 1994, with the release of the PlayStation and Sega Saturn, Gonzo began shifting its focus on digital animation. In 1996, the studio produced the animated sequences for the video game Lunar: Silver Star Story Complete. Seeking to demonstrate its ability to produce complete, self-contained narrative works, Gonzo produced its first anime production, the OVA Blue Submarine No. 6 in 1998.

=== Formation of the GDH Group ===
In May 1999, Gonzo was reorganized as a joint-stock company and changed its name to Gonzo K.K.

In February 2000, Shinichiro Ishikawa, a former Boston Consulting Group employee and representative director of Digimation, joined the company, and the holding company Gonzo Digimation Holdings was established. Gonzo and Digimation became wholly owned subsidiaries of the holding company, establishing the group's management structure. This formed the GDH Group, with Gonzo serving not only as the name of the studio but also as the brand name of the group as a whole.

In April 2002, Gonzo and Digimation merged and changed the company name to Gonzo Digimation. In July 2004, the company was renamed GONZO K.K., while Gonzo Digimation Holdings was renamed GDH. In November of the same year, GDH was listed on the Mothers Tokyo Stock Exchange.

Since 2000, Gonzo ventured into television anime production, and the 2005 television anime Black Cat was their first work based on a manga serialized on Weekly Shonen Jump, a genre that had previously been associated with works aimed at niche audiences.

In 2006, Gonzo released its first theatrical film, Origin: Spirits of the Past. The year also marked the company's 15th anniversary, for which it planned several projects, including an anime adaptation of Tow Ubukata's Mardock Scramble. However, the project was canceled later that year amid production difficulties. Another 15th-anniversary project, Afro Samurai, was produced for the American market and premiered on Spike TV in 2007. The series sold approximately 400,000 copies in the United States and was followed by Afro Samurai: Resurrection and video game adaptations.

On April 2008, Gonzo becomes the first anime studio to simulcast anime internationally, licensing The Tower of Druaga: The Aegis of Uruk and Blassreiter to Crunchyroll.

=== Group restructuring ===
In the late 2000s, the company fell into financial difficulties due to the collapse of the DVD boom.

In September 2008, the company conducted a third-party allotment of new shares to Iwakaze Fund, an investment limited partnership managed and operated by Iwakaze Capital, making Iwakaze Fund the largest shareholder.

On April 1, 2009, as part of efforts to improve the financial condition of the GDH Group, Gonzo was absorbed into its parent company, GDH, which changed its corporate name to Gonzo K.K. As a result, Gonzo, the corporation originally established in 1992, ceased to exist. On June 3 of the same year, the company's accounting auditor, BA Tokyo Audit Corporation, issued a disclaimer of opinion on its financial statements for the fiscal year ended March 2009, citing the possibility of difficulties in securing funds to repay its debts and uncertainty over the achievement of its restructuring plan. On June 29, the decision was made to delist the company from the Mother's Toyko Stock Exchange and the company was delisted on July 30. Around the same time, the group's financial difficulties led to the reorganization and sale of its digital production divisions and group companies, as well as the separation of its production studios into independent companies.

Following Shangri-La and Saki in 2009, Gonzo primarily worked on promotional videos for video games and provided animation production services for other companies. In 2010, the company had no television anime or original video animation projects as the primary production studio. After the two aforementioned series ended, Gonzo went approximately one year and ten months without a production in which it served as the primary studio. In 2011, the company announced teo new productions, marking its return to producing anime, Nyanpire and Last Exile: Fam, the Silver Wing.

In July, 2016, ADK announced a tender offer for Gonzo shares with the aim of making it a consolidated subsidiary. As a result, ADK acquired 197,347 shares (ownership ratio of 84.01%). On December 27 of the same year, ADK announced that it had engaged in inappropriate accounting practices in previous fiscal years. An investigation report was published on January 10, 2017. In response, on February 6, of the same year, it submitted amended securities reports for the 13th to 17th fiscal years to the Kanto Local Finance Bureau.

In June, 2019, Gonzo announced that it would transfer parts of its animation production businesses, intellectual property rights to Studio KΑΙ. On October 31, of the same year, the studio dissolved its subsidiary Okinawa Gonzo. and defunct on April 8, 2020.

In March 2020, It was revealed that the company planned to execute a reverse stock split. If approved, it would reduce the number of issued shares from 934,972 down to 24, making the company a wholly owned subsidiary of ADK in the process. After making Gonzo into an wholly owned subsidiary of ADK, it will transfer all of its shares in the company to Shinichiro Ishikawa.

In 2021, the NFT anime project Samurai cryptos was announced. On October 15, 2024, a promotional video directed by Ai Yokoyama, Samurai Religion, on the official YouTube channel GONZODOGA. This marks the first anime project under the Gonzo name in four years, since 7SEEDS part 2 in 2020.

== Financial issues ==
The studio had a financial problem in their closing account in the 2008–2009 term and stated its deficit was estimated over US$30 million. The Tokyo Stock Exchange announced that on July 30, 2009, Gonzo would be delisted from the exchange. This delisting is the conclusion of a notification made to investors in March 2008 that the studio's financial liabilities exceeded its total financial assets. Since Gonzo was unable to reverse this, paperwork for delisting was filed at the end of June.

The studio is still able to operate, and its parent company GDH has absorbed it in an effort to consolidate management. The combined company now simply refers to itself as Gonzo. By April 2009, the merger was complete.

As part of the restructuring, GDH also sold the Gonzo Rosso game development subsidiary, GDH Capital financing subsidiary, and remaining shares of Tablier Communications initially acquired in March 2006. Gonzo Rosso K.K. was sold to Chushou service kikou kabushikigaisha (division of Incubator Bank of Japan, Limited) on March 31, 2009.

Since this deficit, Gonzo has started to post better earnings due to the release of titles such as Rosario + Vampire to western online streaming services such as Netflix. The marketing of these products to western audiences has returned Gonzo to financial stability, and Gonzo posted higher than expected profit margins in the April–September 2012 period.

== Works ==
=== TV series ===
Title	First run start date	First run end date	Eps	Notes
Gate Keepers	April 3, 2000	September 18, 2000	24	Based on a game by Kadokawa.
Vandread	October 3, 2000	December 26, 2000	13	Based on the light novels. Co-animated with Digimation.
Samurai Girl: Real Bout High School	July 30, 2001	October 22, 2001	13	Based on a light novel by Reiji Saiga. Co-animated with Digimation.
Final Fantasy: Unlimited	October 2, 2001	March 26, 2002	25	Based on Square Enix's Final Fantasy franchise.
Hellsing	October 10, 2001	January 16, 2002	13	Based on a manga by Kouta Hirano. Co-animated with Digimation.
Vandread the Second Stage	October 5, 2001	December 28, 2001	13	Second season of Vandread. Co-animated with Digimation
Full Metal Panic!	January 8, 2002	June 18, 2002	24	Based on a light novel by Shoji Gatoh.
Saikano	July 2, 2002	September 24, 2002	13	Based on a manga by Shin Takahashi.
Kiddy Grade	October 8, 2002	March 18, 2003	24	Original work.
Gravion	October 7, 2002	December 16, 2002	13	Original work.
Kaleido Star	April 4, 2003	March 27, 2004	51	Original work.
Last Exile	April 7, 2003	September 28, 2003	26	Original work.
Gad Guard	April 17, 2003	December 30, 2003	26	Original work. In collaboration with Amber Film Works.
Peacemaker Kurogane	October 7, 2003	March 24, 2004	24	Based on a manga by Nanae Chrono.
Chrono Crusade	November 24, 2003	June 10, 2004	24	Based on a manga by Daisuke Moriyama.
Gravion Zwei	January 8, 2004	March 25, 2004	12	Second season of Gravion.
Gantz	April 12, 2004	November 18, 2004	26	Based on a manga by Hiroya Oku.
Burst Angel	April 6, 2004	September 14, 2004	24	Original work.
Samurai 7	June 12, 2004	December 25, 2004	26	Based on a movie by Akira Kurosawa.
Desert Punk	October 4, 2004	March 28, 2005	24	Based on a manga by Usune Masatoshi.
Gankutsuou: The Count of Monte Cristo	October 5, 2004	March 29, 2005	24	Based on a novel by Alexandre Dumas.
Speed Grapher	April 7, 2005	September 29, 2005	24	Original work.
Basilisk	April 12, 2005	September 20, 2005	24	Based on a manga by Masaki Segawa.
Trinity Blood	April 28, 2005	October 6, 2005	24	Based on a light novel by Sunao Yoshida.
Transformers: Galaxy Force/Cybertron	January 8, 2005 (Japan); July 2, 2005 (USA)	December 31, 2005 (Japan); October 2, 2006 (USA)	52	Co-produced by Hasbro and Takara, in collaboration with Sunwoo Entertainment.
G.I. Joe: Sigma 6	September 10, 2005 (USA)	October 28, 2006 (USA)	26	Co-produced by Hasbro
SoltyRei	October 6, 2005	March 30, 2006	24	Original work. In collaboration with AIC.
Black Cat	October 6, 2005	March 30, 2006	24	Based on a manga by Kentaro Yabuki.
Glass Fleet	April 4, 2006	September 21, 2006	26	Original work.
Witchblade	April 16, 2006	September 20, 2006	24	Based on the comic of the same name.
Welcome to the N.H.K.	July 9, 2006	December 17, 2006	24	Based on a novel by Tatsuhiko Takimoto.
Marginal Prince	October 1, 2006	December 24, 2006	13	Based on a dating simulation mobile game by NTT Docomo. In collaboration with Tokyo Kids and Studio T&B.
Red Garden	October 3, 2006	March 13, 2007	22	Based on a manga by Kirihito Ayamura.
Pumpkin Scissors	October 2, 2006	March 19, 2007	24	Based on a manga by Ryotary Iwanaga. In collaboration with AIC.
Master of Epic: The Animation Age	January 8, 2007	March 26, 2007	12	Based on an MMORPG by Konami. In collaboration with Palm Studio.
Afro Samurai	January 4, 2007	February 1, 2007	5	Based on a manga by Takashi Okazaki.
Getsumento Heiki Mina	January 13, 2007	March 24, 2007	11	Original work.
Romeo × Juliet	April 4, 2007	September 26, 2007	24	Based on a play by William Shakespeare.
Bokurano	April 8, 2007	September 25, 2007	24	Based on a manga by Mohiro Kitoh.
Kaze no Stigma	April 21, 2007	September 21, 2007	24	Based on a light novel by Takahiro Yamato.
My Bride Is a Mermaid	April 1, 2007	September 30, 2007	26	Based on a manga by Tahiko Kimura. In collaboration with AIC.
Dragonaut: The Resonance	March 3, 2007	March 26, 2008	25	Original work.
Rosario + Vampire	January 3, 2008	March 27, 2008	13	Based on a manga by Akihisa Ikeda.
The Tower of Druaga: the Aegis of Uruk	April 1, 2008	June 20, 2008	12	Based on a game by Namco.
S · A: Special A	April 6, 2008	September 14, 2008	24	Based on a manga by Maki Minami. In collaboration with AIC.
Blassreiter	April 5, 2008	September 27, 2008	24	Original work.
Strike Witches	July 3, 2008	September 18, 2008	12	Based on a manga by Yoshiyuki Kazumi
Rosario + Vampire Capu2..	October 2, 2008	December 24, 2008	13	Based on a manga by Akihisa Ikeda, sequel to Rosario + Vampire.
Linebarrels of Iron	October 3, 2008	March 20, 2009	24	Based on a manga by Eiichi Shimizu.
The Tower of Druaga: the Sword of Uruk	January 8, 2009	March 26, 2009	12	Based on a game by Namco, sequel to The Tower of Druaga: The Aegis of Uruk.
Saki	April 6, 2009	September 28, 2009	25	Based on a manga by Ritz Kobayashi.
Shangri-La	April 6, 2009	September 14, 2009	24	Based on a manga by Eiichi Ikegami.
Nyanpire	July 6, 2011	September 21, 2011	12	Based on a manga by yukiusa.
Last Exile: Fam, the Silver Wing	October 15, 2011	March 23, 2012	21	Original work, sequel to Last Exile.
Ozuma	March 16, 2012	April 21, 2012	6	Based on Lightning Ozma manga by Leiji Matsumoto. In collaboration with LandQ Studios.
Leviathan: The Last Defense	April 6, 2013	July 7, 2013	13	Based on a mobile game produced by GREE.
Dog & Scissors	July 1, 2013	September 16, 2013	12	Based on a light novel by Shunsuke Sarai and Tetsuhiro Nabeshima.
A Town Where You Live	July 13, 2013	September 28, 2013	12	Based on a manga by Kouji Seo.
Blade & Soul	April 3, 2014	June 26, 2014	13	Based on a game by NCSOFT.
Seiyu's Life!	July 7, 2015	September 29, 2015	13	Based on a manga by Masumi Asano.
Aokana: Four Rhythm Across the Blue	January 12, 2016	March 29, 2016	12	Based on a visual novel by Sprite.
Akiba's Trip: The Animation	January 4, 2017	March 29, 2017	13	Based on a game by Acquire.
18if	July 7, 2017	September 29, 2017	13	Based on a mobile game by MobCast.
Kakuriyo: Bed & Breakfast for Spirits	April 2, 2018	September 24, 2018	26	Based on a light novel by Midori Yūma.
Space Battleship Tiramisu	April 3, 2018	December 25, 2018	26	Based on a manga by Satoshi Miyakawa.
Hinomaru Sumo	October 5, 2018	March 29, 2019	24	Based on a manga by Kawada.
Conception	October 10, 2018	December 26, 2018	12	Based on a game by Spike Chunsoft.
Try Knights	July 30, 2019	October 15, 2019	12	Based on a manga by Shunsaku Yano. In collaboration with Seven.
Phantasy Star Online 2: Episode Oracle	October 7, 2019	March 30, 2020	25	Based on a game by Sega. In collaboration with Studio Kai.
Kakuriyo: Bed & Breakfast for Spirits 2nd season	October 2, 2025	December 18, 2025	12	Based on a light novel by Midori Yūma, sequel to Kakuriyo: Bed & Breakfast for Spirits. In collaboration with Makaria.

=== OVAs ===
Title	Release start date	Release end data	Eps	Notes
Blue Submarine No. 6	October 25, 1998	March 25, 2000	4	Based on a manga by Satoru Ozawa.
Melty Lancer: The Animation	May 25, 1999	May 25, 2000	6	Based on a game by Tenky.
Gate Keepers 21	April 24, 2002	January 8, 2003	6	Based on a game by Kadokawa.
Yukikaze	August 28, 2002	August 26, 2005	5	Based on a novel series by Chōhei Kambayashi.
Kaleido Star Aratanaru Tsubasa Extra Stage	September 24, 2004	September 24, 2004	1	Original work.
Strike Witches	January 1, 2007	January 1, 2007	1	Based on a manga by Yoshiyuki Kazumi.
Burst Angel: Infinity	March 23, 2007	March 23, 2007	1	Original work.
Red Garden: Dead Girls	August 8, 2007	August 8, 2007	1	Based on a manga by Kirihito Ayamura.
Zero Escape: Virtue's Last Reward Special OVA	December 11, 2011	December 11, 2011	1	Based on a game by Spike Chunsoft.
Hori-san to Miyamura-Kun	September 26, 2012	May 25, 2021	6	Based on a manga by Hero.

=== ONAs ===
Title	Release start date	Release end date	Eps	Notes
Zaion: I Wish You Were Here	October 4, 2001	November 3, 2001	4	Original work.
Calamity of a Zombie Girl	July 4, 2018	July 4, 2018	1	Based on a light novel by Ryō Ikehata. In collaboration with Stingray.
Saint Seiya: Saintia Shō	December 10, 2018	February 18, 2019	10	Based on a manga by Chimaki Kuori.
7 Seeds	June 28, 2019	March 26, 2020	24	Based on a manga by Yumi Tamura.
Hero of Robots	August 16, 2019	September 27, 2019	4	Based on a game by International Games System.

=== Films ===
Title	Release date	Duration	Notes
Origin: Spirits of the Past	January 7, 2006	94 min	Original work.
Brave Story	July 8, 2006	112 min	Based on a novel series by Miyuki Miyabe.
Afro Samurai: Resurrection	January 25, 2009	100 min	Based on a manga by Takashi Okazaki, sequel to Afro Samurai.
Bayonetta: Bloody Fate	November 23, 2013	91 min	Based on a game by PlatinumGames.
Last Exile: Fam, The Silver Wing: Over the Wishes	February 6, 2016	120 min	Original work, sequel to Last Exile: Fam, the Silver Wing.
Full Metal Panic 1: Boy Meets Girl	November 25, 2017	120 min	Based on a light novel by Shoji Gatoh.
Full Metal Panic 2: One Night Stand	January 13, 2018	85 min	Based on a light novel by Shoji Gatoh.
Full Metal Panic 3: Into the Blue	January 20, 2018	120 min	Based on a light novel by Shoji Gatoh.

=== Games ===
- 1996: Lunar: Silver Star Story Complete (PlayStation / Sega Saturn) – contributed anime sequences
- 1997: Silhouette Mirage – contributed anime sequences
- 1997: Grandia – contributed animation support
- 1998: Lunar 2: Eternal Blue Complete (PlayStation / Sega Saturn) – contributed anime sequences
- 1998: Radiant Silvergun – contributed anime sequences
- 1999: The King of Fighters: Dream Match 1999 (Sega Dreamcast) – contributed anime intro sequence
- 1999: Genso Suikogaiden Volume 1: Swordsman of Harmonia contributed intro FMV and character stills
- 2001: Genso Suikogaiden Volume 2: Duel at Crystal Valley – contributed intro FMV and character stills
- 2001: SkyGunner – contributed anime sequences
- 2002: Suikoden III – contributed intro FMV
- 2003: Zone of the Enders: The 2nd Runner – contributed anime sequences
- 2008: Phantasy Star 0 – contributed anime sequences
- 2009: BlazBlue: Calamity Trigger – contributed anime sequences in home version
- 2009: Summon Night X: Tears Crown – contributed anime sequences
- 2010: Super Street Fighter IV – contributed anime ending sequences
- 2010: BlazBlue: Continuum Shift – contributed anime sequences in home version

=== Music videos ===
- 2004: "Breaking the Habit" by Linkin Park
- 2007: "Freedom" by Blood Stain Child
- 2008: "Forsaken" by Dream Theater

=== Shorts ===
- 2013: The Midnight Animals

=== Manga ===
- 2001: Vandread
- 2002: Vandread (Vandread Special Stage)
- 2003: Kiddy Grade (Kiddy Grade Versus)
- 2003: Kiddy Grade (Kiddy Grade Reverse)
- 2004: Bakuretsu Tenshi (Angel's Adolescence)
- 2005: Gankutsuou
- 2005: Speed Grapher
- 2007: Romeo x Juliet
- 2007: Red Garden
- 2007: Getsumen to Heiki Miina
- 2008: Blassreiter – Genetic

== International distribution ==
Many of Gonzo's titles were licensed for North American distribution by Geneon, ADV Films, and Funimation Entertainment. ADV Films UK branch was the UK distributor for Gonzo titles licensed by ADV, with the exception of Gantz, as it was licensed by MVM Films. Gad Guard, Hellsing, and Last Exile, which were titles originally licensed by Geneon, were also licensed by ADV Films UK, although they're no longer licensed since the company's closure. MVM Films was the UK licensee for the majority of Gonzo titles licensed by Funimation in the US, with the exception of Afro Samurai, which was initially distributed directly in the UK by GDH and later by Manga Entertainment UK who also licensed Strike Witches (season 1), Origin: Spirits of the Past, Last Exile and Hellsing. Welcome to the N.H.K., Pumpkin Scissors, and Red Garden, which were originally licensed by ADV Films UK, were re-licensed by MVM Films.

In June 2006, it signed a long-term output deal with the anime television network, Animax, which saw Animax broadcasting all of Gonzo's anime titles across all of its networks around the world, including Japan, Asia, the Indian subcontinent, and Latin America and from November 2007 on Southern Africa's DSTV satellite network. As of 2008 they decided to stream some of their airing anime on video sites such as: YouTube, Crunchyroll, and BOST. Gonzo's precarious financial situation at the time, as well as their history of experimentation with digital technologies, arguably lead them to be the first anime company to license their content of Crunchyroll, then largely known for their anime piracy.
