= List of Azumanga Daioh episodes =

This is a complete list of episodes for the Japanese anime television series Azumanga Daioh produced by the animation studio J.C.Staff, and based on the manga series of the same name written and illustrated by Kiyohiko Azuma. The series originally aired on TV Tokyo, TV Aichi, TV Osaka, and AT-X in five-minute segments each weekday from 8 April 2002 until 30 September 2002. Each week's segments were repeated that weekend in a 25-minute compilation episode with an opening and credits, for a total of 130 five-minute segments and 26 episode compilations. The compilation episodes were released to VHS and DVD by Starchild Records; the five-minute segments can be distinguished by their individual titles.

In the United States, the anime television series was released by ADV Films in both a six-volume DVD set on 9 September 2005, and later reissued as a five-volume "thinpak" DVD set. The sixth DVD volume of the first release included The Very Short Azumanga Daioh Movie. The first three episodes are available for iOS, although episode two requires Wi-Fi.

== Episode list ==
No.	Title	Original release date
1	"Child High School Student / She's a Prodigy / Scary Maybe? / Wildcat Tomo-chan! / The Osakan Gal"; Transliteration: "Kodomo Kōkōsei / Tensai Desu / Kowai Kana? / Bakusō Tomo-chan / Ōsaka-jin Ya" (Japanese: 「こども高校生」 「天才です」 「こわいかな?」 「爆走ともちゃん!」 「大阪人や」)	April 8, 2002
While running late to school, the bike of Yukari Tanizaki unexpectedly breaks down. She soon steals a bike of a male student, who is also late for class, and dashes toward the school. Chiyo Mihama is introduced to the high school homeroom class as a ten-year-old child prodigy, as she showcases her talents in making plush toys and cooking desserts. Sakaki, being a soft-spoken girl, is perceived as frightening to the others. Although it is revealed that Sakaki is fond of cats, a stray cat named Kamineko bites her hand on two occasions. An energetic Tomo Takino tries to challenge Chiyo and Sakaki in academics and athletics, respectively. Newcomer Ayumu "Osaka" Kasuga is nicknamed based on her birthplace, despite being totally different from the many cultural stereotypes.
2	"Osaka Today As Well / P.E., Volleyball / Hiccups / The Brain... / Brand New"; Transliteration: "Kyō mo Ōsaka / Taiiku Barēbōru / Shakkuri / Nō ga / O Nyū" (Japanese: 「今日も大阪」 「体育·バレーボール」 「しゃっくり」 「脳が」 「おにゅー」)	April 15, 2002
Osaka evaluates her past rural and present urban lifestyles. She is told by Koyomi "Yomi" Mizuhara that Chiyo is highly gifted and talented. Osaka is oblivious to the chaos around her in the classroom caused by a cockroach, being focused on eye floaters instead. She shows her lack of physical fitness in physical education, unable to sprint in track and field and unable to execute an overhand pass in volleyball. After eating spicy food, Osaka develops hiccups, which Chiyo, Tomo, Yomi, and Sakaki try to get rid of using traditional and foolish methods. Osaka ends up transferring her hiccups to Chiyo. She then plays on a Japanese idiom between "the grain of truth" and "the truth about grain". She later unknowingly daydreams about Chiyo's theoretically detachable pigtails during class, soon being caught by Yukari nonetheless.
3	"Nyamo / Factional Rivalry / Yukari's Here / Not My Fault / Forever and Ever"; Transliteration: "Nyamo / Habatsu Tōsō / Yukari ga Kita / Warukunaimon / Dokomademo" (Japanese: 「にゃも」 「派閥闘争」 「ゆかりがきた」 「悪くないもん」 「どこまでも」)	April 22, 2002
Yukari invites Minamo "Nyamo" Kurosawa to go to a local bar after work, while Chiyo receives her swimsuit from Nyamo. Chiyo tells Tomo, Yomi, and Osaka that Yukari and Nyamo are actually alumni of the school. Yukari is jealous about Nyamo being more popular among her students, which urges her to convince her class to play basketball in an attempt to boost her own popularity. Nyamo joins in the game and easily defeats Yukari, winning admiration from the students. Yukari later pays a visit to Nyamo, using construction work at her place as an excuse to catch up on sleep. When Nyamo receives a delivery from her uncle in Hokkaido, Yukari mistakes the package as food, when only a wooden bear sculpture is found inside. After the two argue, they end up breaking the sculpture apart. On their way to a local bar, they encounter an English-speaking foreigner, with whom Yukari is able to talk fluently. At the local bar, Yukari appears to be unable to use chopsticks, to which Nyamo teaches her how to use them and shows off her skills. Frustrated and jealous, Yukari drinks herself drunk and falls asleep. Nyamo helps Yukari back to her house.
4	"A Fun Profession / Pool, Pool, Pool / Ribbon / Just the Two of Them / A Good Person?"; Transliteration: "Tanoshii Shokugyō / Pūru Pūru Pūru / Ribon / Futarikkiri / Ii Hito?" (Japanese: 「楽しい職業」 「プールプールプール」 「りぼん」 「ふたりっきり」 「いいひと?」)	April 29, 2002
When Kimura is asked why he became a teacher, he replies that he likes high school girls. The girls criticize his blunt comment but the boys commend Kimura for his sincerity. While changing for swimming class, breast sizes are compared among the gang. During the stretching portion of the swimming class, an infuriated Nyamo kicks a lustful Kimura out of the pool area, even though he was permitted to observe. Chiyo admits that she cannot swim but is reluctant enough to do a dog paddle. Osaka tries to learn how to float by being a corpse. Yukari interrupts the class by belly-flopping into the pool, and Kimura manages to sneak back into the pool. Yukari challenges Nyamo to a swimming relay race. Unfortunately, Yukari suffers a leg cramp halfway through the first lap, and Nyamo is left to care for her. Meanwhile, the students from Yukari's class and Nyamo's class challenge each other in their respective teacher's place. Chiyo, Tomo, Yomi, and Osaka see Kimura messing behind a bush. They soon find out that he was collecting cans and bottles for recycling purposes and charitable intentions.
5	"Summer Break / Welcome to Chiyo's Room / Invitation / Someone with Experience, Speak / Done For"; Transliteration: "Natsuyasumi / Yōkoso Chiyo no Heya e / Goshōtai / Keikensha Katatte / Mō Dame" (Japanese: 「なつやすみ」 「ようこそちよの部屋へ」 「ご招待」 「経験者語って」 「もうだめ」)	May 6, 2002
As the summer break is under way, Nyamo attempts to make Yukari set herself a schedule, splitting her time among rest, leisure, and swimming. Meanwhile, Tomo, Yomi, and Osaka are invited to go to Chiyo's house. They are overwhelmed by the spaciousness and the splendour of the mansion. They are even more surprised when Chiyo invites them to her summer house, bringing Sakaki, Yukari, and Nyamo along as well. While Chiyo, Tomo, and Yomi play in the ocean, Osaka and Sakaki sit together with the former spouting trivial facts. Tomo and Osaka try to make the night more exciting with scary stories and dirty talks, though both fail to do a good job. Afterwards, everyone goes outside to play with fireworks. Upon returning to school, the girls share their pictures taken at the summer house, though strange reactions occur when viewing them.
6	"Equation for Victory / Sakaki of Class 3, Kagura of Class 5 / Runaway Victory / Yay / Dancing the Grand Finale"; Transliteration: "Shōri no Hōteishiki / Sangumi no Sakaki, Gokumi no Kagura / Butchigiri / Waai / Odoru Daidan'en" (Japanese: 「勝利の方程式」 「三組の榊、五組の神楽」 「ぶっちぎり」 「わーい」 「踊る大団円」)	May 13, 2002
The athletics carnival is soon approaching. Yukari tells her class to only think about winning, especially against Nyamo's class, promising them drinks if they win. On the day of the athletic carnival arrives, Yukari attempts to sabotage Nyamo's star student, Kagura, by offering her an anpan, but she is caught by Nyamo in the process. Sakaki defeats Kagura in the 400 meter dash. Chiyo and Osaka have poor teamwork in the three-legged race and constantly falls onto their faces. Nyamo's class defeats Yukari's class in the tug-of-war. Since Chiyo claims she has not done anything to help the rankings of her class, she is assigned to be a cheerleader. Sakaki closely wins the baton relay over Kagura. Afterwards, the school participates in a folk dance together. Kaorin is delighted when she gets to dance with Sakaki. However, her mood quickly reverses when she gets Kimura as her next partner. Because Yukari's class won the athletics carnival, Nyamo gives Yukari ten thousand yen. Nevertheless, Nyamo takes the money back due to money Yukari owes her, as the latter escapes the situation of being unable to pay for drinks for her class.
7	"Fairyland Class / Man of Character / Go with Enthusiasm! / The Mascot / Enemy?"; Transliteration: "Otogi no Gumi / Jinkakusha / Nori Nori Gō! / Masukotto / Teki?" (Japanese: 「おとぎの組」 「人格者」 「のりのりゴー!」 「マスコット」 「敵?」)	May 20, 2002
Chiyo, in her capacity as class president, asks the class what they want to do for the upcoming cultural festival. Yukari says that conventional and orthodox ways mark the death of intellect, and Chiyo comes up with a suggestion box. A stuffed animal exhibition is drawn from the suggestion box. Kimura attempts to give his own suggestion but is silenced by Tomo. Chiyo introduces her dog, Mr. Tadakichi, to Sakaki, who becomes content when she pets him and is awed to see that Chiyo can ride him. On the day of the arrival of the cultural festival, Tomo wears a cat suit and runs around the school in it to advertise the exhibition. Throughout the day, Sakaki helps students buy stuffed toys from the exhibition. After the cultural festival, Yukari's class celebrate on their huge success.
8	"Osaka's New Year's Dream / In Tomo-chan's Case / In Sakaki's Case / Welcome / In Kaorin's Case"; Transliteration: "Ōsaka no Hatsuyume / Tomo-chan no Baai / Sakaki no Baai / Yōkoso / Kaorin no Baai" (Japanese: 「大阪の初夢」 「ともちゃんの場合」 「榊の場合」 「ようこそ」 「かおりんの場合」)	May 27, 2002
Osaka dreams Chiyo flying using her pigtails as propellers. When Osaka takes Chiyo's pigtails off her head, Chiyo collapses. Osaka panics, attaches Chiyo's pigtails to her head and flies away. Meanwhile, Tomo dreams about herself being a heroic high school student, winning beauty contests and scoring fulls marks in a test while Chiyo and Yomi score zero marks. At the same time, Sakaki dreams about meeting Chiyo, who introduces a cat to her but the cat identifies himself as Chiyo-Father. She also dreams about being invited to Chiyo's house to have dinner with Chiyo and Chiyo-Father. Kaorin dreams about being rescued by Sakaki from the yakuza. Her dream is interrupted by her mother waking her up to meet her friends at a shrine for New Year's Day. When the group assembles, they remember that Chiyo were in their respective dreams. Yomi comes along to see Chiyo frantically asking what she was like in their dreams.
9	"If I Can't Pet One... / 11 Years Old / Mr. Kitty Cat... / Premise / Why?"; Transliteration: "Sawarenai Nara / 11 Sai / Neko-san... / Settei / Nande?" (Japanese: 「触れないなら」 「11才」 「ねこさん...」 「設定」 「何で?」)	June 3, 2002
At a movie theater, Sakaki watches a film about a girl who finds a stray cat, and is emotionally affected by it. At school, Kaorin shows off photos of her new kittens to Sakaki. This inspires her to attempt to photograph a cat she finds, however this one prevents her from obtaining a clear shot of it. Sakaki later spots Chiyo in a cat costume, though she helps Chiyo carry it back to her home, since Chiyo had a hard time wearing it. Back in class, Chiyo reveals that her birthday is coming up soon. Chiyo prefers to be taller in order to be cool, but Sakaki prefers to be shorter in order to be cute. Yomi concocts a birthday party for Chiyo. Sakaki envisions both Chiyo and herself in ribbons, to different effects. Sakaki goes in pursuit of a gift. A cat notebook is taken by a girl when Sakaki is distracted, and a toy cat malfunctions as she reaches for it. She is then led to a crane game full of stuffed animals, picking up two plush cats after three tries. At Chiyo's house, the guests arrive and present their gifts. Tomo gives Chiyo a magic wand, but this fails to impress her. Yomi gives her a book, and Sakaki gives her one of the plush cats from the crane game. Osaka also gives her a plush cat, which Sakaki recognizes as Chiyo-Father. Chiyo and Tomo then argue whether the Yomiuri Giants or the Hanshin Tigers will win the upcoming baseball season. The group takes a stroll through a park with Mr. Tadakichi, seeing and enjoying a gorgeous sunset.
10	"Draft Nomination / Class Change / Wolf / Superior Airs Woosh Woosh / Marco..."; Transliteration: "Dorafuto Shimei / Kurasu Gae / Ōkami / Senpai Kaze Pyū Pyū / Maruko..." (Japanese: 「ドラフト指名」 「クラス替え」 「おおかみ」 「先輩風ぴゅｰぴゅｰ」 「マルコ...」)	June 10, 2002
As a new school year begins, Osaka is concerned about being separated from her closest friends. Yukari reassures that she as well as the other girls will be her homeroom students again. Kaorin tries to predict whether she will be in the same class as Sakaki by pulling the petals off flowers. The group finds themselves together, though Osaka fails to notice this at first because her nickname was used instead. Kaorin is overjoyed that she shares a class with Sakaki. Kagura is also in class with Sakaki, but the latter has not a clue who the former is. Yukari, who recognizes many of her students, is insistent on learning the names of incoming sophomores. Though Tomo is the mascot of the school, the insulting remarks of Kagura causes a fight between the two. Kagura joins Sakaki for the trip home, hoping that she would join the swimming team, even after she has already declined to join any other club. Chiyo is annoyed by freshmen fawning over her cuteness, and Sakaki is in a similar predicament happening over her perceived coolness. Tomo decides to make the class eat lunch early, fooling Kimura thinking it was already lunchtime. After class, Yukari brings in a kitten in hopes that someone will take it home. Chiyo hits upon the idea of having it as a class pet that students will take turns caring for. The girls get a chance to hold the cat, but it runs away when Sakaki is hesitant.
11	"Cosmopolitan City / Showdown / Even If You Don't Fight / Covered in Cats / Don't Run"; Transliteration: "Kokusaitoshi / Taiketsu / Tataka na Kute mo / Nekomamire / Nigenaide" (Japanese: 「国際都市」 「対決」 「たたかなくても」 「ねこまみれ」 「逃げないで」)	June 17, 2002
Kagura helps a male foreigner move his luggage to the train station, struggling yet succeeding to communicating her intent. Yukari takes notice of this, attempting to demonstrate the proper way of handling such a situation, but fails to comply. Tomo draws an insult regarding Kagura's encounter. However, Tomo herself does not know that IT is an abbreviation for information technology. Kagura joins Sakaki on the way to school, and starts talking about mountain bikes, but Sakaki is distracted by blooming flowers. Kagura challenges Sakaki in competitive eating at lunchtime, but Sakaki refuses to eat at faster than normal speed. Sakaki hits one of Kagura's pitches in softball during gym class, as the ball lands on Chiyo's head in the outfield. When it comes time to take physical measurements, Tomo is excited over an increased bust size. Kimura makes a comment about it. Sakaki becomes upset when Kagura draws on a Neco Coneco advertisement in a magazine when they are looking at pictures of mountain bikes. On the way home, Kamineko headbutts and bites Sakaki, but Kagura manages to shoo it away. At home, Sakaki daydreams of being in a meadow with cats, who initially growl at her but eventually turn friendly. She reads in the magazine of a road where cats gathers, and she sets out by bike to the location. When she returns and meets Chiyo and Kagura, she is bandaged in several places. Later on, as Sakaki and Kagura are walking, Kagura begins scaring away any cat that crosses their path, but Sakaki wants to face and overcome this problem on her own. After approaching Kamineko again, Sakaki is able to pet it, despite having been bitten already. Kaorin finds Sakaki at the arcade, unaware that Sakaki has been playing the crane game to collect more plush cats.
12	"Chiyo-chan's Day / High School Friends / Lunch / Afternoon / Skipping Rope"; Transliteration: "Chiyo-chan no Ichinichi / Kōkō no Tomodachi / Ohiru / Gogo / Nawatobi" (Japanese: 「ちよちゃんの1日」 「高校のともだち」 「お昼」 「ごご」 「なわとび」)	June 24, 2002
Chiyo wakes up, fixes her lunch, wakes her parents, eats her breakfast, and then leaves for school. Chiyo learns from former elementary school classmates, Miruchi and Yuka-chan that jump rope is becoming popular again. Sakaki walks with Chiyo but disappears when she sees Kamineko. Tomo purposefully forgets to record a show for Yomi. Tomo, speculating on why Yukari is late, guesses that Yukari is trying to buy the limited edition box of a video game. A bandaged Sakaki enters the classroom after trying to pet Kamineko, and a tardy Yukari arrives only to prove Tomo's theory right. Osaka falls asleep in class, and Yukari catches her. Kimura breaks down when revealing that girls at another school sometimes attend homeroom in gym clothes or swimsuits. Chiyo, Tomo, Yomi, and Osaka eat lunch on the roof, enjoying the breeze of the clear sky. Chiyo tries swimming in gym class without a kickboard, but Tomo accidentally runs over her with one. Tomo does a terrible job of sweeping, and Osaka is unable to use a dustpan correctly. Chiyo does her homework after school. Chiyo is accompanied by Sakaki when walking Mr. Tadakichi through the park, eventually witnessing some children jumping rope in the park. The children leave the jump rope behind when they all depart, letting the three spend time jumping rope. They are soon joined with Tomo, Yomi, and Osaka. Chiyo prepares to sleep in the late evening, only to hope to stay up all night when she is older. Yomi reads at her desk, Tomo eats snacks while watching a funny television show, Osaka relaxes in the bathtub, Kagura plays a video game, and Sakaki reads on her bed with plush cats surrounding her.
13	"Tactics without Guard / S / Midterms / Formation / Ability"; Transliteration: "Nō Gādo Senpō / S / Chūkan Tesuto / Kessei / Nōryoku" (Japanese: 「ノーガード戦法」 「S」 「中間テスト」 「結成」 「能力」)	July 1, 2002
A fight ensues when Yomi denies Tomo from seeing her mathematics homework. Tomo jokingly says that "a fruit next door is a fruit that feeds on families", to which Yomi delivers a left uppercut instead of a correction. Tomo, Osaka, and Kagura all ask Yomi the scope of the upcoming grammar exam, only to be referred as knuckleheads by her. The three decide to study everything but become carried away by discussing about martial artists. Kagura borrows Sakaki's notes, yet ends up drawing arrows through an animal doodled in the margin. Tomo realizes that her prediction regarding the format of the grammar exam was highly mistaken. Tomo, Osaka, and Kagura performed poorly on the exam, comparing how low their scores are with each other. On the other hand, Chiyo and Yomi performed excellently on the exam. Tomo wants to acquire Chiyo's academic ability and Sakaki's athletic ability. Osaka offers her abilities to be tardy and forgetful, causing Tomo to envision the dramatic entrance that would come from the combination of these four abilities. After comparing her lack of intelligence with Kagura, Tomo discloses that she only had put effort in studying for the entrance exam, all just to attend the same school with a doubtful Yomi.
14	"Shopping / Gathering / Sea! / Capturing Strategy / Adult's World"; Transliteration: "Okaimono / Shūgō / Umii! / Hokaku Sakusen / Otona no Sekai" (Japanese: 「おかいもの」 「集合」 「うみー!」 「捕獲作戦」 「大人の世界」)	July 8, 2002
Chiyo invites Tomo, Yomi, Sakaki, Osaka, Kagura, and Yukari to her summer house. Chiyo and Osaka discover that two people should not ride on the same bike. They meet up with Tomo, who is shopping for a swimsuit. Osaka confuses the escalator with the elevator. Sakaki arrives early the next morning so she can wait with Mr. Tadakichi. Chiyo had asked her father to rent a van for the group, since Chiyo was traumatized from riding in Yukari's car the previous summer. After arriving at the summer house, Tomo grabs the key from Chiyo and throws it into the nearby woods. When Chiyo finds the key, Yomi has Sakaki restrain Tomo to allow Chiyo to open the door. At the beach, Yomi takes requests for drinks. By the time Yomi is back with Osaka's orange juice, Osaka's swim ring has drifted far from shore. Sakaki sculpts a Neco Coneco figure in the sand, but the artwork is destroyed when Osaka returns ashore. Everyone changes into their yukata for the summer festival. Nyamo has never worn a yukata before, yet is able to tie a necktie, according to Yukari. Sakaki wins a Neco Coneco toy at a shooting gallery and Kagura declares her a sniper. Back at the summer house, Yomi tells Tomo that sleeping and awaking early will profit in the long run. When Yukari brings out sake, Nyamo takes it upon herself to drink it to prevent Yukari from getting drunk. After drinking half the bottle of sake and several cans of beer, Nyamo answers Tomo's question concerning adult relationships. The next morning, Chiyo wants Nyamo to clarify what she said to Tomo, Yomi, Osaka, and Kagura, all who seemed very thankful for what they have learned the previous night.
15	"Kimura's Family / Ya See, Ya See? / An Unexpected Mother? / Hardness / Results"; Transliteration: "Kimura Ke no Hitobito / Mita Mita? / Mikakunin Okusan / Gachi Gachi / Kekka Happyō" (Japanese: 「木村家の人々」 「みたみた?」 「未確認奥さん」 「ガチガチ」 「結果発表」)	July 15, 2002
Yukari promises her class free drinks and steak if they win the athletics festival this year. The girls are incredulous to find out that Kimura has a wife and daughter. Chiyo, Tomo, and Osaka have ambitious aspirations for the basket scramble, yet Chiyo is the one out of the three to score a point. Tomo carelessly rolls a gigantic ball over Chiyo in the ball rolling. Osaka enjoys putting her face in flour in the obstacle course, only to lose her chance of winning. During the cavalry battle, Tomo is the horseman, while Chiyo, Yomi, and Osaka make up the horse. The horse collapses, partly because Osaka pretends to eat with chopsticks to figure out right from left, without confronting another team. Tomo tells Yomi, who is drinking juice to replenish, to drink water instead due to Yukari's promise. Tomo uses an empty can to get the attention of Kimura's wife, trying to find how loyal she is to her husband. During the scavenger race, Chiyo is assigned to look for something stupid, borrowing Tomo to fit the description, but without telling her. For the three-legged race, Kaorin is given the chance to be partnered with Sakaki, since Chihiro has sprained her ankle. When the marathon begins, Tomo starts with a last spurt to take the lead, but she ends up in last place with Chiyo and Osaka. Sakaki and Kagura come in sixth and fifth, respectively. Yukari's class overall wins the festival, as Yukari starts to taunt Nyamo's class for losing. The episode ends with Yomi on a bathroom scale, unsatisfied with her weight change.
16	"Combination / Advent / Cute / Order / Advertising Impact"; Transliteration: "Kumiawase / Kōrin / Kawaii / Chūmon / Senden Kōka" (Japanese: 「組み合わせ」 「降臨」 「かわいい」 「注文」 「宣伝効果」)	July 22, 2002
With the culture festival approaching, Tomo comes up with an idea of a haunted house cafe, which is considered but ultimately decided against. Working from the successful idea of the stuffed animal exhibition from the previous year, a stuffed animal cafe is agreed upon. Chiyo starts panicking when the class repeatedly procrastinate in preparations. Sakaki designs hats inspired by Chiyo-Father. Chiyo appears in a cute penguin costume. Yukari jeers at Nyamo since the latter does not have a cute student like Chiyo in her homeroom. Kimura requests Kagura to borrow a hat, only to drive away customers with his unappealing advertising. Chiyo and Osaka check out the themes of other classes while on their break. The two visit both a takoyaki and a taiyaki food booth. In both occasions, Osaka had to feed Chiyo due to her lack of mobility in the penguin costume. They return to the stuffed animal cafe, shocked to see it packed with customers who saw Chiyo in her penguin costume at the food booths.
17	"Osaka's Scary Story / Feeling Different / December / Incredible Santa / Christmas Meeting"; Transliteration: "Ōsaka no Kaidan / Kibun Tenkan / Shiwasu / Sugoi Santa / Kurisumasu Kai" (Japanese: 「大阪の怪談」 「気分転換」 「師走」 「すごいサンタ」 「クリスマス会」)	July 29, 2002
After school, Chiyo invites Osaka to the bookstore, since she wants to buy a panda photo album, prompting Osaka to question whether the fur of a panda is white on black or the opposite. After Tomo and Yomi are asked the same question, Osaka quickly changes the subject to mention a terrifying experience of smelling a fart that did not come from her. The next day, when Yukari comes for class, she declares being tired of teaching only language arts and starts an impromptu gym class, after a frustrated attempt with mathematics. She proposes a soccer match with her students, but after seeing her own ineptitude, she switches to dodgeball, though it seems that Tomo starts to tease Chiyo by throwing the ball over her head. Later at the teachers' lounge, Yukari is checking a mail order gift catalog, musing over its luxury foods, focusing solely on Matsusaka beef however. Tomo and Kagura get into an argument at class concerning Chiyo's belief in Santa Claus, coming up with explanations regarding how gifts are given around the world in one night. When Chiyo settles the matter by saying that Santa Claus is her father, this leaves Sakaki overly flustered with Chiyo-Father on her mind. Then Tomo asks what Yomi would preferred as a gift, to which she responds with a request for a large sum of money. Chiyo answered with the necessity of having a star decorated on top of a Christmas tree in the station square. Then Kagura asks if reindeers exist, Tomo is convinced to disagree, although she is stood corrected. Tomo and Osaka soon figure out that the following year will be the Dragon of the Chinese zodiac. Chiyo is very serious of her academic progress, nonetheless Tomo is not very earnest of her future. On Christman Eve, the girls decide to go to a karaoke bar to watch each other sing.
18	"Elated Yomi / Betrayal / Excited Excited / Companionship's End / Go"; Transliteration: "Uki Yomi / Uragiri / Wakuwaku Wakuwaku / Nakama Hazure / Gō" (Japanese: 「うきよみ」 「裏切り」 「ワクワクワクワク」 「仲間はずれ」 「ゴー」)	August 5, 2002
Yomi returns with stories from her recent trip to Hokkaido after the winter break. Much to Tomo's displeasure, Yomi boasts about the things she experienced such as her first trip in an airplane, an all-you-can-eat crab buffet, and the outdoor hot springs in Noboribetsu. During her bad experience throughout the day, Tomo pays for milk tea at a vending machine, but it pours the beverage without a cup under it. Yomi on the other hand, receives two cups when purchasing her own. During lunchtime, Tomo insists that Yomi will splatter her broth while she is eating ramen, only for her conjecture to backfire, causing Tomo to rampage wildly until accidentally hitting Yukari in the face with a lunch tray. After lunch, Osaka is seen reading a magazine of popular attractions, one of which being information on a new amusement park. Yomi later buys the amusement park guidebook, excited yet nervous about it. However, she develops a cold come nightfall, but calls Tomo informing her sickness. Tomo uses this opportunity to seek revenge for Yomi boasting about her trip. Yet Chiyo is sympathetic for Yomi not to be a part of the experience. The next day, Chiyo brings a souvenir for Yomi, only to see a mug with a picture of the girls on a roller coaster with an empty seat, as a joke by Tomo to show Yomi's absence. Chiyo later gives her the intended souvenir, a snowglobe with the feline mascot of the amusement park in the center atop a snow-covered hill. The girls rush outside as snow begin to pile up, as they engage in a snowball fight. Yomi unfortunately develops another cold nevertheless.
19	"Yawning Expert / Springtime of Life / Adult Cherry-Blossom Viewing / Child Cherry-Blossom Viewing / Cherry Blossom"; Transliteration: "Akubi Meijin / Nanda ka Seishun / Otona no Hanami / Kodomo no Hanami / Sakura" (Japanese: 「あくび名人」 「なんだか青春」 「大人の花見」 「子供の花見」 「桜」)	August 12, 2002
Nyamo is set up for an arranged marriage by her mother, but she is insecure of her youth. A fatigue epidemic has spread throughout the homeroom class. During lunch, Osaka compares her yawns with that of Chiyo and Tomo. The three fall asleep, resulting in their tardiness in gym class, running laps around the track as punishment. Tomo mentions to the others that she confused hashed beef from curry during lunchtime. Though the swim team only practices during the summer, Kagura is training strenuously for the national championship swim meet. When Yukari invites Nyamo to go flower-gazing in the evening, they go to a hotel bar, much to Nyamo's surprise. They meet their friend Eiko, who despite her young age is a corporate section chief (manager). She invites Nyamo to apply for a position as a gym instructor at her company, but Nyamo declines the offer, already satisfied with her current job. Meanwhile, Chiyo goes out alone late at night to buy erasers at the convenience store, luckily running into Kagura. Eiko summons a few male co-workers to join the three. Chiyo wishes to mature faster in growth, but Kagura is not focused on a career or a marriage. Elsewhere, Tomo enters Yomi's bedroom through the window while a radio show is aired. After Yukari apparently scares off the co-workers, she and Nyamo decide to drink some more. The radio show recognizes a girl who had tried a "grainless" diet but failed to commit to it. Tomo infers that Yomi is the one mentioned, being greatly amused by this. Nyamo considers going through with the arranged marriage setup, but doubts it at the very end.
20	"Separation / Yukari's Birthday / Spread your wings Chiyo / Child President / Please Let Me Be Strong"; Transliteration: "Betsuri / Yukari no Tanjōbi / Habatake Chiyo / Kodomo Daitōryō / Tsuyoku Ikite Kudasai" (Japanese: 「別離」 「ゆかりちゃんの誕生日」 「はばたけちよ」 「こども大統領」 「強く生きてください」)	August 19, 2002
The girls are finally seniors, though having class on the third floor of the school is disadvantageous. Yukari encourages the class to study for the upcoming entrance exams for college the following year. Nyamo receives a handbag from her class as a birthday present, upsetting Yukari since her class forgot about her birthday, which falls during spring break. Yukari is given a handbag from her class the next day to make up for her past birthday. Intending to show off her handbag to Nyamo, Yukari is suddenly interceded by Kimura. Tomo plans to become a police officer. Chiyo wants to apply to an American college, but Osaka scars her with the image of getting kidnapped or murdered. Sakaki tranquilizes them with the vision that Chiyo-Father would come to aid Chiyo. Later after school, Tomo says that Chiyo might as well become the president of the United States, making Osaka fantasize about how Chiyo would have her own country populated by many little lookalikes of her. Yomi decides to buy pork buns since they do not have sugar in them. Chiyo introduces Tomo and Yomi to Miruchi and Yuka-chan, who now sport their own uniforms. Kaorin becomes class president in Kimura's class, much to her chagrin. She contemplates of her memories with Sakaki. After running into Kimura's wife, who has come to bring his lunch, Kaorin resolves to find his good points, one of which is gardening.
21	"Anticipation / I Just Couldn't / Watery Grave / Island of Dreams / Mountain Cat"; Transliteration: "Kitai / Itemo Tattemo / Umi no Mokuzu / Yume no Shima / Yama ni Sumu Neko" (Japanese: 「期待」 「いてもたっても」 「海の藻屑」 「夢の島」 「山にすむネコ」)	August 26, 2002
Yukari announces a field trip to Okinawa, to which Chiyo is ecstatic as this is her first field trip due to her skipping from grade school to high school. On the day of the trip, Tomo and Kagura are revealed to have a fear of flying when the plane takes off. The girls immediately go sightseeing at Naha. After comparing the depiction of the Shureimon to a two thousand yen bill, they are drawn to the shisa in the Shuri Castle. The girls decide to have dinner at a hotel restaurant. While Tomo and Yomi concentrating on competitive eating at the buffet, Chiyo and Osaka are awed by the chanpurū. The girls visit the Manzamo cliffs the next day, but Chiyo has acrophobia from the heights. Tomo recklessly raises Chiyo over the railing, and Sakaki luckily catches her just as Tomo loses her grip. Yukari later join the girls in going scuba diving, which gave an impact on their enjoyable experience. Afterwards, they shop for souvenirs at Kokusai-dōri. Tomo provokes Yomi in obsessing over chinsukō. Chiyo and Sakaki buy plush shisa. Osaka piques her interest in sata andagi, inadvertently irritating Tomo. Kaorin finds Sakaki, as the two tell each other their next location of tourism. Sakaki notices that Kimura is wearing a shirt similar to that of Kaorin, much to her despair. Then the girls head to Iriomote, where Chiyo has made sightseeing plans. They sees warnings about Iriomote cats in the area, telling bypassers to reduce speed. An Iriomote cat, later recognized as Maya, appears from the nearby woods after Sakaki holds out her hand. Sakaki, after stalling from nervousness, manages to successfully pet and cuddle Maya without being attacked, much to her own surprise and delight. However, she must tearfully part with him when she is to leave Okinawa and return to Tokyo, promising to herself to one day reunite with him.
22	"It's Nice / Tricked / Kurosawa-sensei / Attempted / It's Not Over Yet"; Transliteration: "Naisu Desu yo / Damasareta / Kurosawa-sensei / Misui / Mada Owattenai" (Japanese: 「ナイスですよ」 「だまされた」 「黒沢先生」 「未遂」 「まだ終わってない」)	September 2, 2002
As summer break has started, Tomo proposed that the girls should take a trip to Chiyo's summer house with the intent to study for the entrance exams. Kaorin will be able to accompany them this time. With nine people total, they must split up between Nyamo's new car and Yukari's old car. Kaorin is initially frightened to board it, but nervously decides otherwise after Sakaki volunteers to go with Yukari. Tomo is focused on just going to the beach rather than on studying for the entrance exams. The girls begin to study in the evening. Tomo is frustrated that her plan was dashed, while Osaka is doltish for not understanding simple questions. It is unveiled that Nyamo cannot answer a question in mathematics, prompting Yukari to show her up by making a speech in English. The next morning, Kaorin tries to take pictures of Sakaki, but Tomo jumps in front of her camera every time. Osaka, who is half-asleep, desires to wake Yukari up by banging at a frying pan. However, when she heads into Yukari's room, she holds a knife in her hand, which scares Yukari out of her mind. As the summer break concludes, Tomo comes to class in a highly delusional state, convincing Osaka to soon join her. Chiyo tries desperately to get them motivated, to no avail, until Kagura knocks both of them senseless to get them motivated, accidentally including Chiyo. Yukari later comes to class much in the same state, causing Chiyo to react accordingly.
23	"Chewed / Cheerleaders / I Didn't Think / We'll Run Together / United"; Transliteration: "Kanda / Moriageyaku / Kangaetenakatta / Minna de Hashirimasu / Ichigan" (Japanese: 「かんだ」 「もりあげ役」 「考えてなかった」 「みんなで走ります」 「一丸」)	September 9, 2002
The athletics carnival for this year is just around the corner, and Osaka is looking forward to the competitive bread eating challenge, which is one of the new events of the festival. As she wonders how the bun is hung from a string in the challenge, Kagura inadvertently frightens her when she supposes a fish hook is used. Tomo asks Yukari to reward drinks if the class wins, only for the latter to oppose for not profiting a gamble against Nyamo. Kagura is eccentric on the day before the athletics carnival, however she incidentally collapses the tent Chiyo and Yomi were pitching up. Feeling responsible, she assists in resetting up the tent. Kagura angers Yomi when she points out her absence of fattening bias while preparing to eat a large plate of katsudon. When the day of the athletics carnival arrives, Kimura suddenly springs up expressing his appreciation for girls in bloomers. During a costume race, Tomo and Chiyo dress up like a police officer and prisoner, respectively, and they win due to Tomo pushing all the competition out of their way. During the competitive bread eating challenge, Osaka is thoroughly confused due to the five different selections of bread. For the cheerleading contest, Kaorin meets with Yomi and Chiyo wearing a gakuran, but her emotions shift drastically when Tomo mentions that Sakaki is wearing one as well. Later, Chiyo worries that she may slow her team down for the relay race between classes, but is calmed down when reminded that Sakaki and Kagura are on her team. Tomo falls back from the lead, due to having depleted her stamina since before the race started, before passing the baton to Yomi. Osaka, using her strategy of running with open arms, fails to stop others from passing her, but Kagura later makes up for her lagging colleagues with her speed. Chiyo, on the other hand, despite giving her best, quickly falls behind, prompting a boy from another class to insult her. To make up for her friend, Sakaki speeds uncanningly ahead of the pack as soon as Chiyo hands her the baton. Unfortunately, Yukari stands as the anchor, and with Nyamo going up against her, she is guaranteed to lose until Yukari tramples her down as soon as she is overtaken, making Yukari's class to finish in last place.
24	"Career Path / Showdown / Let's Hurry / Popularity / Together with Maya"; Transliteration: "Shinro / Taiketsu / Hayaku Ikō / Jinbō / Maya to Issho" (Japanese: 「進路」 「対決」 「はやくいこう」 「人望」 「マヤと一緒」)	September 16, 2002
While browsing the internet, Sakaki learns that Maya's mother died in a traffic collision. At her house, Sakaki she fills out a form for possible career choices, thinking of applying to be a veterinarian, but she considers that she would have to move out and thus have her own pets. Even though Kagura blatantly points outs how cats are not attracted to her, Sakaki remains determined to have one when she goes off to live on her own. Later, on her way home with Chiyo, they are ambushed by a pack of cats led by Kamineko. As the cats charge at her, Maya suddenly appears and scares them away with a ferocious growl, just to fall ill soon after, which prompts the two girls to make a run for a nearby veterinarian. As they wait, Chiyo wonders how the orphaned cub managed to find Sakaki, who takes this as a sign. The doctor relieves them by saying that all it needs is to rest and be fed. Though the veterinarian suspects that Maya is an Iriomote cat, Sakaki throws him off by saying he is a mixed breed cat. Chiyo then volunteers to take care of the cub until springtime while Sakaki, determined to give her all to take care of him, finds her own place to reside. Upon hearing of the news, the girls all decide to stop by Chiyo's house to see Maya. While there, Osaka rushes to sit under a kotatsu in Chiyo's bedroom for comfort. Moreover, Tomo uses Maya to tease Mr. Tadakichi, which earns her a scratch in the hand from the kitten and harsh reprimands from Yomi. After the girls leave, Chiyo offers Sakaki to sleep over so she can stay with Maya. They notice how Maya seems to treat Sakaki as a surrogate mother, as she shows Chiyo her true colors.
25	"Course Discussion / Pray for Success / Fight! / Study Session / Tomo and Osaka's Day of Fate"; Transliteration: "Shinro Sōdan / Gōkaku Kigan / Faito / Benkyōkai / Tomo to Ōsaka Unmei no Hi" (Japanese: 「進路相談」 「合格祈願」 「ファイト」 「勉強会」 「ともと大阪 運命の日」)	September 23, 2002
With the entrance exams nearby, everyone is focused in it, except for Tomo, who rather ask wordplay questions to stump Chiyo. They are outmatched when Osaka manages to answer all questions correctly and cluelessly. Chiyo informs Osaka for possibly being a schoolteacher, after the latter is concerned for a suitable career. Yukari, after being consulted by Osaka, chews Chiyo out for feeling insulted. All the girls gather at Chiyo's house to study. On New Year's Day, the girls assemble at the shrine to pray for their success in the entrance exams. Tomo is mortified to get bad luck foretold for the upcoming year. Ironically, upon meeting Yukari and Nyamo, the former tells them that the son of the shrine priest did not pass his entrance exams, rendering all fortunes useless. Before their entrance exams, Osaka comes up with a superstition to allow all the girls to pass, in that they each must split a pair of chopsticks perfectly in half. Chiyo, in turn, gives them all lucky charms she handcrafted. At another study session at Chiyo's house, she muses about how fast their high school period passed by them, and they are about to graduate. Sakaki and Kagura manage to pass their exams, but Tomo and Osaka do not. However, they still have another chance to make it, and thanks to Chiyo, they eventually do. With that, there is only a violently resolute Yomi left to pass her own exams.
26	"First Graduation / A Thousand Emotions / Sadness / Our Old School / Everyone"; Transliteration: "Hajimete no Sotsugyō / Bankan / Kanashimi / Bokō / Minna" (Japanese: 「初めての卒業」 「万感」 「悲しみ」 「母校」 「みんな」)	September 30, 2002
Before the graduation ceremony, Osaka reveals to Chiyo that she suffers from hay fever, so she has to keep tissues and eyedrops with her at all times. Later, at the ceremony, Chiyo is presented with the prize of best academic performance, and brims with joy upon receiving a standing ovation started by Tomo and Osaka. When "Aogeba Tōtoshi", the song that marks Japanese high school graduation, is sung, Chiyo is unable to hold back her tears upon remembering that she will have to leave her school behind. Later, Yukari comes into class devastated because she lost her wallet and, while handing out the diplomas, everyone starts contributing with money, though at low quantities. She quickly changes her mood when Nyamo comes with her retrieved wallet however. Nyamo is effusively congratulated by her class for all the work, Kimura bursts into tears when mentioning that the students will leave him company, and Yukari receives a large flower bouquet contributed by every student in her class. Afterwards, Kaorin asks Tomo to take a picture with Sakaki and demands a copy be sent to her. While Kagura thinks of obtaining a piece of furniture from the class as a keepsake, Yukari explains that she already has her memories of high school to take with her. Chiyo proposes that everyone goes to the amusement park again as a graduation trip, which Yomi accepts to come this time, but she feels insulted when Tomo says they should wait after her results come out. When leaving school, Chiyo takes her time to bid it farewell with one last bow. On the day that the entrance exam results are posted, Yomi is initially shocked when Tomo informs her that she did not pass, but Yomi rechecks this and sees that she has been approved along with the others. Finally, as they all head for the train station toward the amusement park, Chiyo realizes that, even after graduation, they will always be together.

== Music ==
Two original soundtracks were released that were composed by Masaki Kurihara. The two soundtracks to the anime were released in the United States by Geneon. The opening to each episode uses a song called "Soramimi Cake" (空耳ケーキ, Soramimi Kēki; lit. "Cake of Mishearing", translated by ADV as "Fancy Hearing Cake"). Soramimi Cake was performed by Oranges & Lemons, Aki Hata provided the lyrics, and Masumi Itō the music. The ending of each episode uses a song called "Raspberry Heaven". Oranges & Lemons again performed this song while Aki provided the lyrics, Raspberry Heaven's music was done by Yōko Ueno.
