= Thundarr the Barbarian =

American 1980–1981 animated series

- 1980 Thundarr the Barbarian promotional image Foreground from left to right Thundarr, Ariel, and Ookla
- Genre: Post-apocalyptic; Science fantasy; Action-adventure
- Created by: Steve Gerber; Joe Ruby; Ken Spears
- Developed by: Steve Gerber
- Written by: Buzz Dixon; Martin Pasko; Mark Evanier; Ted Pedersen; Steve Gerber; Christopher Vane; Roy Thomas; Jacob Kurtzberg
- Directed by: Charles A. Nichols; John Kimball; Rudy Larriva
- Voices of: Robert Ridgely; Nellie Bellflower; Henry Corden
- Narrated by: Dick Tufeld
- Composer: Dean Elliott
- Country of origin: United States
- No. of seasons: 2
- No. of episodes: 21

Production
- Executive producers: Joe Ruby; Ken Spears
- Producer: Jerry Eisenberg
- Production company: Ruby-Spears Productions

Original release
- Network: ABC
- Release: October 4, 1980 – October 31, 1981

Thundarr the Barbarian is an American post-apocalyptic animated series, created by Steve Gerber and produced by Ruby-Spears Productions. The series ran for two seasons on ABC from October 4, 1980, to October 31, 1981, and was rerun on NBC in 1983.

== Plot ==
Thundarr the Barbarian is set in a future (c. 3994) post-apocalyptic wasteland of Earth divided into kingdoms and territories, the majority of which are ruled by wizards, and whose ruins typically feature recognizable geographical features from the United States, such as New York City, Los Angeles, Las Vegas, Seattle, the Badlands, Mount Rushmore, Denver, Atlanta, Boston, San Antonio and its Alamo, San Francisco, Washington, D.C., Cape Canaveral, and the Grand Canyon. Other episodes with recognizable settings are set outside the United States, and include Mexico and London. Another notable feature of this future Earth is that the Moon was broken in two pieces. The shattered moon and the ruins of the former human civilization were caused by the passage of a runaway planet between the Earth and the Moon in 1994, which, from scenes shown in the opening sequence, caused radical changes in the Earth's climate and geography. However, by the time period in which the series is set, the Earth and Moon seem to have settled into a new physical balance. Earth is reborn with a world of "savagery, super-science, and sorcery" far more chaotic than "Old Earth" (the show's name for the pre-apocalyptic world).

The hero Thundarr, a muscular barbarian, and companions Princess Ariel, a formidable young sorceress, and Ookla the Mok, a mighty humanoid ape-like creature, travel the world on horseback, fighting injustice. Their main adversaries are evil wizards who combine magical spells with reanimating technologies from the pre-catastrophe world. Some of these malevolent wizards enlist the service of certain mutant species to do their bidding.

Other enemies include The Brotherhood of Night (a group of werewolves who could transform others into werewolves by their touch), the cosmic Stalker from The Stars (a predatory, malevolent cosmic vampire), and various other mutants. Intelligent humanoid-animal races include the rat-like Groundlings, the crocodile-like Carocs, and talking hawk-like and pig-like mutants. New animals that existed include fire-shooting whales, a giant green snake with a grizzly bear's head, and mutated dragonflies and rabbits.

Thundarr's weapon is the Sunsword that projects a blade-like beam of energy when activated, and can be deactivated so that it is only a hilt. The Sunsword's energy blade can deflect other energy attacks as well as magical ones, can cut through nearly anything, and can disrupt magical spells and effects. The Sunsword is magically linked to Thundarr and as such, only he can use it; however, this link can be disrupted. (Note: The episode "Master of the Stolen Sunsword" details events where the Sunsword needs to be recharged, and viewers learn it becomes linked to whoever does the charging.)

== Characters ==
- Thundarr (voiced by Robert Ridgely) is a barbarian who was once a slave to Sabian until he was freed by Princess Ariel and given the Sunsword which he uses as a weapon in his fight against evil wizards and other villains. Thundarr, along with his friend Ookla, are largely unknowledgeable about the world so they rely on Ariel's guidance.
- Ookla the Mok (voiced by Henry Corden) is a Mok, a humanoid feline-like creature with cat-like eyes, pointed cat-like ears, and a thick lion-like mane. In Thundarr the Barbarian's backstory, Ookla and Thundarr were enslaved in the court of the wizard Sabian until Ariel helped them escape. As a Mok, Ookla has great strength, and he usually fights by ripping up wreckage and clubbing his enemies with it. On a few occasions, he uses a longbow that fires a type of paralyzing arrow. However, he is also the most likely of the heroes to charge right into an enemy attack and he is also easily enraged by unusual nuisances or threats. Moks dwell in their own territory, ruled by a king; they fear and hate water.
- Princess Ariel (voiced by Nellie Bellflower) is a powerful sorceress. In the episode "Battle of The Barbarians", it is revealed that Thundarr was once a slave of the evil wizard Sabian before being freed by Princess Ariel. Her most common feats of sorcery involve creating light constructs such as archways and bridges over chasms, exploding spheres, levitating weights, and summoning nets or shields. She can also produce powerful energy blasts, blinding light, and magically reanimate machines. When her wrists are bound together, she cannot work her magic, and is vulnerable to capture.

== Production ==
The series was the creation of comic book writer Steve Gerber. Gerber and friend Martin Pasko were having dinner in the Westwood area one night during the time Gerber was developing the series. Gerber commented to Pasko that he had not yet decided upon a name for the wookiee-like character the network insisted be added to the series, over Gerber's objections. As the two walked past the gate to the UCLA campus, Pasko quipped, "Why not call him Oo-clah?" Pasko later became one of several writers also known for their work in comics, such as Roy Thomas, to contribute to the show. After writing several scripts, singly and in collaboration with Gerber, Pasko became a story editor on the second season. Other writers included Buzz Dixon and Mark Jones.

Comic book writer-artist Jack Kirby worked on the production design for the show. The main characters were designed by fellow comic book writer-artist Alex Toth. Toth, however, was unavailable to continue working on the show, so most of the wizards and other villains and secondary characters that appear on the show were designed by Kirby. He was brought onto the show at the recommendation of Gerber and Mark Evanier.

Twenty-one half-hour episodes were produced by Ruby-Spears Productions, an animation house formed by former Hanna-Barbera head writers Joe Ruby and Ken Spears, and aired from October 1980 to October 1981 on the ABC network. Despite decent ratings, the show was cancelled, as ABC wanted to make room in the programming schedule for Laverne & Shirley in the Army, a Hanna-Barbera/Paramount-produced spin-off of the popular ABC sitcom Laverne & Shirley. Reruns of Thundarr appeared on NBC's Saturday morning lineup in 1983.

== Episodes ==
=== Season 1 (1980) ===
All episodes of season 1 were directed by Rudy Larriva and produced by Jerry Eisenberg.

List of Thundarr the Barbarian season 1 episodes
No. overall	No. in season	Title	Location	Original release date	Prod. code
1	1	"Secret of the Black Pearl"	New York City (Manhattan)	October 4, 1980	27-01
Thundarr, Princess Ariel, and Ookla escort a man who is carrying a magical black pearl that can defend against the cyborg wizard Gemini (who has a rotating double-sided head) and his Groundlings (a race of mutated rat people). The man needs the pearl to protect the inhabitants of the village of "Manhat", which is actually the ruins of Manhattan.
2	2	"Harvest of Doom"	Chichen Itza, Yucatán Peninsula, Mexico	October 11, 1980	27-02
Thundarr, Princess Ariel, and Ookla encounter a train carrying Death Flowers (whose pollen can hypnotise both humans and Moks) being transported by the Carocs (a race of crocodile people) to a wizard that they work for. The episode introduces Tye, a swamp-urchin, who agrees to aid Thundarr on the condition that he capture the train and give it to her. Tye would reappear in Season 2's "Last Train to Doomsday".
3	3	"Mindok the Mind Menace"	Cape Canaveral, Florida	October 18, 1980	27-04
The evil wizard Mindok lost his body in the Great Cataclysm, 2,000 years earlier, although his brain survived. He, General Zoa, and Zoa's minions seek out cryogenically frozen 20th-century scientists called "Ice People" in a plot to build Mindok a new body for his brain.
4	4	"Raiders of the Abyss"	New York City (Note: Ariel refers to the U.S. Badlands, but the ruins of New York City's Empire State Building and World Trade Center (Twin Towers) appear later in the background.)	October 25, 1980	27-03
The evil wizard Morag and his raiders attack a cruise ship village to kidnap its inhabitants and steal their life essence.
5	5	"Treasure of the Moks"	Norfolk, Virginia	November 1, 1980	27-05
Thundarr, Princess Ariel, and Ookla come to the aid of the Mok Chieftain Oblach against Captain Kordon, Queen of the River Pirates, who is after the Moks' hidden treasure and intends to use the "fire lances of the ancients" to get it. Thundarr learns that these "fire lances" are actually 20th century torpedoes. Thundarr and the Moks try to thwart the pirates from obtaining the weapons but are unsuccessful, as Captain Kordon launches an attack on the Mok village. In the end, the River Pirates are unable to find the treasure and are defeated, and the Moks reveal the treasure was hidden in the hillside.
6	6	"Attack of the Amazon Women"	Mount Rushmore, South Dakota	November 8, 1980	27-07
Thundarr, Princess Ariel, and Ookla come to the aid of a race of amphibious Amazons led by the deposed Queen Diona who has been usurped by Stryia, an evil half-human, half-shark wizard-queen who plans to conquer both the land and seas with her shark legion army.
7	7	"The Brotherhood of Night"	Washington, D.C.	November 15, 1980	27-06
Zevon is the leader of the Brotherhood of Night, a tribe of werewolves that can add anyone to their ranks by touching them and is also targeting the evil wizard Infernus hoping to make the pack completely invincible.
8	8	"Challenge of the Wizards"	Las Vegas, Nevada	November 22, 1980	27-08
Thundarr, Princess Ariel, and Ookla are caught up in a battle between the wizards Sholow and contestants Basim, Skorpos and Chom who seek the Helmet of Power. Thundarr ends up having to side with the wizard Sholow when he threatens a group of villagers.
9	9	"Valley of the Man-Apes"	San Fernando Valley, California	November 29, 1980	27-09
Simius and his fellow Man Apes assemble salvaged parts of a movie studio's giant robotic gorilla in a plot to terrorize the local villagers.
10	10	"Stalker from the Stars"	Denver, Colorado	December 6, 1980	27-10
A spaceship containing an alien vampire lands on Earth. The alien captures Princess Ariel and all the villagers in the ruins of Lakeside Amusement Park hidden under the snow and ice of the Rockies as a source of its food.
11	11	"Portal Into Time"	San Antonio, Texas	December 13, 1980	27-12
The evil wizard Khromm threatens a tribe of humans at the Alamo. They can protect themselves by using a sophisticated Guardian machine that utilizes flying robot drones that can disable the wizard's laser tanks. However, it blows a circuit and cannot be replaced as circuits are no longer produced. Their only hope is to infiltrate Crom's lair in order to use his moon dial, which sends them to Old Earth. In the 20th century, Thundarr, Ookla and Ariel are aided by a little girl named Samantha, who helps them obtain a fresh circuit. The trio return to the present and reactivate the Guardian, which defeats Khromm's forces and saves the Alamo people.
12	12	"Battle of the Barbarians"	San Francisco, California	December 20, 1980	27-11
The evil wizard Kublai seeks the Golden Scepter of the Yantzee (the only item which can strip him of his magic) and terrorizes the villagers of San Francisco's Chinatown in the process. When Thundarr thwarts his initial attempts, the wizard recruits another barbarian named Zogar to engage him in battle while Kublai tries again to find the scepter.
13	13	"Den of the Sleeping Demon"	Grand Canyon, Arizona	December 27, 1980	27-13
Judag is a bitter, escaped former slave of an evil wizard who plans to awaken a sleeping demon that allegedly can grant whoever wakes it the powers of 1,000 wizards. It is up to Thundarr to prevent Judag from accomplishing this mission.

=== Season 2 (1981) ===
All episodes of season 2 were directed by Rudy Larriva and John Kimball, with animation supervision by Milt Gray & Bill Reed.

List of Thundarr the Barbarian season 2 episodes
No. overall	No. in season	Title	Location	Original release date	Prod. code
14	1	"Wizard Wars"	St. Louis, Missouri	September 12, 1981	R20-001
The wizard Skullus and his soldiers are enslaving villagers living in a ruined oil refinery and using them to attack the fortress of his enemy, the equally evil wizard Octagon.
15	2	"Fortress of Fear"	La Brea Tar Pits, Los Angeles, California	September 19, 1981	R20-002
When coming to the aid of an escaped slave, Thundarr, Princess Ariel, and Ookla are captured by robots working for the multi-eyed wizard Lord Argoth who wants Ariel as his bride.
16	3	"Island of the Body Snatchers"	London, England	September 26, 1981	R20-003
The trio investigate a sector called the Mystery Zone where several ships get wrecked on an island. They learn the evil witch Circe is responsible as she needs a young sorceress to overcome a curse in which she will turn to stone if she leaves the island. When Ariel arrives with Thundarr and Ookla, Circe gets her opportunity as she switches bodies with her and becomes a threat to the others as she tries to leave the island.
17	4	"City of Evil"	Boston, Massachusetts	October 3, 1981	R20-004
After being defeated by Thundarr, the evil wizard Sarott finds a research lab that holds the miniaturized City of Thieves. Its ruler Vortak promises Sarott a free rein to use the city's advanced army to enslave humans and other wizards if he can restore it to normal size. To do so, he'll need the Gauntlet of Power which can boost his magic to enlarge the city.
18	5	"Last Train to Doomsday"	Grand Canyon, Arogonda	October 10, 1981	R20-005
Thundarr, Ookla, and Ariel are in pursuit of a mummy-like Janus after he and a race of hawk mutants attack villages and the train route of Tye (the former swamp urchin from "Harvest of Doom") who is now a train-driving "businesswoman". The group is in for a surprise when it turns out Janus is actually Gemini (who Thundarr's group last fought in "Secret of the Black Pearl") in disguise seeking revenge on Thundarr.
19	6	"Master of the Stolen Sunsword"	Beverly Hills and Hollywood, California	October 17, 1981	R20-006
During a battle with Yondo (a supposed wizard with unusual magic), Thundarr is struck by red negative lightning which significantly diminishes the power of his Sunsword. The weapon can be restored at the nearby Pool of Power, but it is stolen by Yondo who seeks to have the Sunsword's power for himself.
20	7	"Trial by Terror"	Atlanta, Georgia	October 24, 1981	R20-007
Thundarr's friend Thorac is accused of stealing a village's fuel and is about to receive a death sentence (by being boiled alive over a geyser) when the barbarian rescues him. Thorac is granted a reprieve when Thundarr and the group investigate the crime, eventually learning the town's sheriff Korb is in league with the evil wizard Artemus. Artemus had stolen the fuel to power his Death Ship and gain the approval of the Council of Wizards.
21	8	"Prophecy of Peril"	Texases Peit, Texicana	October 31, 1981	R20-008
Thundarr, Princess Ariel, and Ookla battle the evil wizard Vashtarr when he steals the Crystal of Prophecy that can give the details of his downfall. When it shatters in his efforts to retrieve it, the prophecy is foretold as they learn three women will unite to defeat him. One is Maya, an element-shifter buried in the ruins of the old city of Endorr. Another is Cinda, a hermit barbarian living in the Canyon of Death whose staff grants her great strength. The last is Valerie Storm, a fashion model from Old Earth who is abducted and taken prisoner by Vashtarr himself. The three women defeat Vashtarr and are transported to Old Earth.

== Cast ==
- Robert Ridgely as Thundarr, Manhat Dweller (in "Secret of the Black Pearl"), Mindok's Henchman (in "Mindok the Mind Menace"), Elder (in "Stalker from the Stars"), Security Guard (in "Portal Into Time"), Tavern Drunk (in "Battle of the Barbarians"), Judag (in "Den of the Sleeping Demons"), Yondo's Henchman (in "Master of the Stolen Sunsword")
- Nellie Bellflower as Princess Ariel, Manhat Dweller (in "Secret of the Black Pearl"), Dr. Craft (in "Mindok the Mind Menace"), Mina (in "Stalker from the Stars")
- Henry Corden as Ookla the Mok, Gemini (in "Secret of the Black Pearl", "Last Train to Doomsday"), Caroc Leader (in "Secret of the Black Pearl"), Rider (in "Raiders of the Abyss"), Zet (in "Valley of the Man-Apes"), Zogar (in "Battle of the Barbarians"), Tavern Drunk (in "Battle of the Barbarians"), Tork (in "Den of the Sleeping Demons"), Yeek (in "Tavern of the Sleeping Demons"), Skullus (in "Wizard Wars"), Villager (in "Wizard Wars"), Metaloid (in "Fortress of Fear"), Slave (in "Fortress of Fear"), Captain Willows (in "Island of the Body Snatchers"), Vortak (in "City of Evil"), Yondo's Henchman (in "Master of the Stolen Sunsword"), Mutant Deputy #2 (in "Trial by Terror"), Fashion Show MC (in "Prophecy of Peril")
- Dick Tufeld as Opening Narration

=== Additional voices ===
- Michael Ansara as Vashtarr (in "Prophecy of Peril")
- Marlene Aragon as Maya (in "Prophecy of Peril")
- Liz Aubrey as Valerie Storm (in "Prophecy of Peril")
- Michael Bell as Yondo (in "Master of the Stolen Sunsword"), Wolmak (in "Master of the Stolen Sunsword"), Villager (in "Master of the Stolen Sunsword")
- Alan Dinehart as Ponce (in "Treasure of the Moks")
- Al Fann
- Joe Higgins as
- Stacy Keach Sr.
- Keye Luke as Zevon (in "The Brotherhood of Night"), Infernus (in "The Brotherhood of Night"), Kublai (in "Battle of the Barbarians")
- Chuck McCann as Artemus (in "Trial by Terror"), Korb (in "Trial by Terror"), Mutant Deputy #1 (in "Trial by Terror"), Villager (in "Trial by Terror")
- Nancy McKeon as Tye (in "Harvest of Doom", "Last Train to Doomsday")
- Julie McWhirter as Stryia (in "Attack of the Amazon Women")
- Shepard Menken
- Alan Oppenheimer as Mindok (in "Mindok the Mind Menace"), Morag (in "Raiders of the Abyss"), The Old Wizard (in "Raiders of the Abyss")
- Avery Schreiber as Octagon (in "Wizard Wars")
- Hal Smith as Simius (in "Valley of the Man-Apes")
- Joan Van Ark as Captain Kordon (in "Treasure of the Moks"), Queen Diona (in "Attack of the Amazon Women"), Cinda (in "Prophecy of Peril")
- Janet Waldo as Circe (in "Island of the Body Snatchers")
- William Woodson as Crom (in "Portal Into Time"), Traffic Cop (in "Portal Into Time"), Lord Argoth (in "Fortress of Fear")

== Crew ==
- Alan Dinehart - Voice Director

== Broadcast ==
The series ran on ABC from October 4, 1980 through September 12, 1982 with two seasons and 21 total episodes and performed well in the ratings.

The series was rebroadcast on Cartoon Network from October 1992 through October 1996.

== Home media releases ==
The debut episode of Thundarr the Barbarian was released on DVD as part of Warner Home Video's Saturday Morning Cartoons: 1980s compilation series. The DVD set, containing episodes of ten other shows, was released on May 4, 2010. It is now available for online download through Amazon.com.

On September 28, 2010, Warner Archive released Thundarr the Barbarian: The Complete Series to DVD in region 1 as part of their Hanna–Barbera Classics Collection. This is a Manufacture-on-Demand (MOD) release, available exclusively through Warner's online store and Amazon.com. The DVD set is branded as part of the Hanna-Barbera Classics Collection as Thundarr and the other 1978–1991 Ruby-Spears programs were sold to Turner Broadcasting in 1991 alongside Hanna-Barbera by Great American Broadcasting. On April 6, 2021, Warner Archive also released Thundarr the Barbarian: The Complete Series on Blu-ray.

== Influence ==
In a November 2017 interview with Revolver, Morbid Angel guitarist Trey Azagthoth stated that the band's new album, Kingdoms Disdained, is based on Thundarr the Barbarian,

"Thundarr the Barbarian [inspired the new album's title]...In the year 1994, a runaway planet hurtling between Moon and Earth unleashes cosmic destruction. Man's civilization is cast in ruin. 2,000 years later Earth is reborn. A strange new world arises from the old — a world of savagery, super science, and sorcery. But one man bursts his bonds to fight for justice with his companions — Ookla the Mok and Princess Ariel. He pits his strength, his courage and his fabulous Sun Sword against the forces of evil. He is "THUNDARR - THE BARBARIAN!!!"

There is also a filk band from Buffalo, New York called Ookla the Mok. The series was referenced and was involved in the plot of the third-season episode "One Watson, One Holmes" of the CBS television series Elementary. In Fairlady #3, by Brian Schirmer and Claudia Balboni, the characters Dunkarr, the Barbarian, Ari and Oosk were inspired by the main characters in the series.

== Merchandise ==
=== Toys ===
Action figures of the three main characters were released by Toynami in 2003. A board game was released by Milton Bradley Company in 1982.

=== Comics and books ===
A Sunday strip illustrated by Jack Kirby was planned, but the project was canceled. Whitman Comics had a Thundarr comic book project with scripts by John David Warner and art by Winslow Mortimer that never went to press. Whitman instead published a coloring book in 1982.

Dynamite Entertainment announced plans in July 2024 for a Thundarr comic debut. The comic book was launched in February 2026, written by Jason Aaron with art by Kewber Baal and variant covers by Michael Cho, Rob Liefeld, Dan Panosian, Francesco Mattina, Joseph Michael Linsner, Björn Barends, and others.

== Analysis ==
The show's entry in The Encyclopedia of Science Fiction notes that "Like many other animated works of its time with innovative settings, Thundarr the Barbarian has enjoyed a modest cult following. In the sf context it is notable as one of the first instances of the Post-Holocaust Ruined Earth theme appearing in Western animated Children's SF: an influential contribution to the late twentieth-century visual Science Fantasy [SF megatext], as a vehicle through which many young viewers in the 1980s and 1990s were first introduced to a number of related tropes.".

In his book Television Cartoon Shows, author Hal Erickson wrote the following:

Joe Ruby and Ken Spears, producers of Thundarr the Barbarian, demonstrated that they'd kept their eyes and ears open while working for Hanna-Barbera, particularly in the adroit handling of props and the well-defined character design (including a Hanna-Barbera-like sexy female lead). But Ruby-Spears also repeated a major Hanna-Barbera shortcoming in Thundarr: No matter how well written the script, the climax was invariably a pointless, violent confrontation in which the characters never really learned anything about their world or their roles in that world.

Though a ratings success which spawned more than a few copycat programs, Thundarr the Barbarian was an unsatisfying blend of social satire and wanton destruction, its superior production values squandered on second-rate story resolutions. The whole "future barbarianism" concept would be better handled a decade later by Nelvana's Cadillacs and Dinosaurs (q.v.).
