= Scrapped Princess =

Japanese light novel series and its adaptations

- Cover art for the first light novel

スクラップド・プリンセス (Sukurappudo Purinsesu)
- Genre: Sword and sorcery
- Light novel
- Written by: Ichirō Sakaki
- Illustrated by: Yukinobu Azumi
- Published by: Fujimi Shobo
- English publisher: NA: Tokyopop
- Imprint: Fujimi Fantasia Bunko
- Original run: March 18, 1999 – October 20, 2005
- Volumes: 13, and 5 collections of short stories
- Manga
- Written by: Ichirō Sakaki
- Illustrated by: Yabuki Go
- Published by: Fujimi Shobo
- English publisher: NA: Tokyopop
- Magazine: Dragon Comics; Monthly Dragon Age
- Original run: December 2002 – February 2004
- Volumes: 3
- Anime television series
- Directed by: Sōichi Masui
- Produced by: Jun Katō; Masahiko Minami; Satoru Negishi; Yūsuke Abe; Hitoshi Hayakawa
- Written by: Reiko Yoshida
- Music by: Hikaru Nanase
- Studio: Bones
- Licensed by: Crunchyroll; NA: Bandai Entertainment (former)
- Original network: WOWOW
- English network: US: iaTV
- Original run: 8 April 2003 – 7 October 2003
- Episodes: 24
- Manga
- Written by: Toshinori Sogabe
- Published by: Kadokawa
- Magazine: Famitsu Comic Clear
- Original run: October 14, 2016 – May 11, 2018
- Volumes: 3
- icon

Scrapped Princess (Japanese: スクラップド・プリンセス, Hepburn: Sukurappudo Purinsesu) is a Japanese light novel series by Ichiro Sakaki and illustrated by Yukinobu Azumi, also known as the popular adult dōjin artist Nakayohi Mogudan. In 2003, it was adapted into an anime series produced by Bones.

Scrapped Princess music was composed by Masumi Itō (pseudonym Hikaru Nanase), and its themes. It begins as high fantasy and then quickly mixes into varying degrees of post-apocalyptic and science fiction elements through the application of Clarke's third law. The atmosphere has undertones of sadness, though many of the characters and situations are superficially light-hearted.

== Plot ==
The story takes place in what appears to be a fantasy world and revolves around a girl named Pacifica Casull, the sister in a pair of twins born to the royal family of a kingdom called Leinwan. Pacifica is abandoned at birth. The 5111th Grendel Prophecy predicts that she is the "poison that will destroy the world" if she reaches her sixteenth birthday. To prevent this, she is dropped off a cliff as an infant ("scrapped").

Pacifica is rescued by a court wizard and adopted by the commoner Casull family. Her foster siblings, Shannon, a swordsman, and Raquel, a wizard, become her protectors. Both siblings are extremely powerful and, more often than not, they easily break out of whatever difficult situation they face. Her siblings travel with her throughout most of the story, protecting her from the numerous attempts on her life by people who fear the outcome of the prophecy. Both siblings' skills see constant use. By contrast, Pacifica is mostly a typical fifteen-year-old and her inability to defend herself is a recurring source of self-doubt for her, as is the constantly repeated insistence that she will destroy the world.

As the series unfolds, it becomes clear that this fantasy world is actually Earth in the distant future. The truth about the prophecy gradually emerges, but as we learn more, new questions keep popping up. Pacifica must discover her hidden destiny, as powerful beings called Peacemakers, who are worshipped in this world as demi-gods, continually manoeuvre to have her destroyed. At the same time, a mysterious being called a Dragoon comes to the aid of Pacifica and her guardians, offsetting the attack of the Peacemakers. It turns out that Pacifica is not "the poison that will destroy the world", but humanity's last hope, as part of a plan that was set in motion 5000 years before by scientists among the human resistance during what were called the Genesis Wars.

Before the Genesis Wars, the Peacemakers were created by humans as weapons against humanity's alien foes, but, determined to protect their human creators and prevent them from destroying themselves, the Peacemakers switched sides and assisted the aliens by imprisoning the survivors of the war in an artificial environment, while at the same time backing up their cultural development to the Middle Ages. The Peacemakers were able to do this with the help of a gifted psychic named Celia Mauser, who, like the Peacemakers themselves, had originally been a tool of the defense. Her powers were used to enhance humanity's weaponry, to the point where it was possible to predict enemy movements. The Peacemakers encouraged Celia Mauser to leak information to them in exchange for the lives of her brother and sister. She was too late; her siblings died, and Celia Mauser's treason was for nothing. Celia was then kept in an area of phase space in a sort of virtual reality for 5000 years, while humanity continued to live on unknowingly in an intangible cage, isolated on a single continent called Dusbin. Her powerful mind was programmed into the artificial environment's control system, and the religion concocted by the aliens to control humanity worships her as a god.

For 5000 years, the Peacemakers watched over humanity, keeping cultural development at a standstill, and prepared to wipe out much of the human race if it ever showed any sign of stepping beyond its apportioned limits (as the Kingdom of Leinwan does toward the end of the series when the attempt is made to coerce the Peacemakers into helping them conquer the world). As the Peacemakers put it, "You don't know you are trapped if all you've ever known is your cage." Humans are completely incapable of resisting the will of the Peacemakers. Just looking a Peacemaker in the eye renders a human obedient – even Shannon and Raquel are not immune to this. Pacifica is the only human being in 5000 years who is immune to this control, and her ability will become communicable to others once she reaches her sixteenth birthday. This is why the Peacemakers are determined to destroy her, and why they have used the Grendel Prophecies to induce others to do the job for them, since Pacifica cannot be directly attacked by the Peacemakers. In the end, Pacifica's twin brother, Prince Forsyth, who has seen the suffering inflicted on his people by the Peacemakers in their attempts to eliminate Pacifica, asks to meet her. Her guardians allow it and he uses the opportunity to stab her in the back, ten hours before she turns sixteen. This causes her to be removed to the phase sphere, where she meets Celia Mauser and is given the choice of whether humanity will remain in their prison or not. Pacifica chooses freedom.

=== Characters ===
==== Pacifica Casull ====
Voiced by: Fumiko Orikasa (Japanese); Kari Wahlgren (English)
Pacifica Casull (パシフィカ・カスール, Pashifika Kasūru) is the eponymous Scrapped Princess, who is prophesied to destroy the world of Providence on her sixteenth birthday. Her parents worried about her power and abandoned her when she was an infant, leaving her to be adopted by the Casull family. Pacifica is generally sweet and cheerful, but wonders how so much suffering can come from her existence and blames herself for it.

Pacifica is stabbed and killed by her biological twin brother, Prince Forsyth, before the prophecy can come to pass. She and her family are revealed to be the Providence Breaker, a group who would be able to resist the mind control of the Peacemakers and destroy the foundations of the system sealing in the humans to free mankind. After learning why Providence was created, Celia gives Pacifica the choice to determine humanity's future. Even though Pacifica is sympathetic to having a protected, ideal world to live in, she chooses instead to let humans make their own choices. As a result of this decision, Celia disappears and Providence is destroyed, freeing mankind once and for all. Pacifica is resurrected and returns to her family farm with Shannon, Raquel, and Zefiris.

==== Shannon Casull ====
Voiced by: Shin-ichiro Miki (Japanese); Crispin Freeman (English)
Shannon Casull (シャノン・カスール, Shanon Kasūru) is the son of Yuhma and Carol Casull, Raquel's younger brother and Pacifica's older foster brother. Shannon is a skilled swordsman who has sworn to defend Pacifica's life no matter what, but he is reserved and calm despite the many difficulties in the Casull siblings' lives. In episode 6 of the anime, Shannon becomes a temporary Dragon Knight ("D-Knight") and is capable of using the power of a Dragoon named Zefiris to fight the Peacemakers. Later in the series, he gives Zefiris his trust and fully merges with her.

==== Raquel Casull ====
Voiced by: Sayaka Ohara (Japanese); Bridget Hoffman (English)
Raquel Casull (ラクウェル・カスール, Rakuweru Kasūru) is the oldest of the Casull children, Shannon's sister and Pacifica's foster sister. She is a powerful magic-user and able to cast spells faster than many others. She has assumed a motherly role in the family and is always kind and calm. Despite her kind, calm and goofy nature, she will not hesitate to strike down anyone in her way of protecting Pacifica or Shannon. Raquel's normal kindness often serves as a cover for a more aggressive and tactical mind that asserts itself whenever Pacifica or Shannon are in danger.

==== Christopher Armalite ====
Voiced by: Takahiro Mizushima (Japanese); Steve Staley (English)
Christopher Armalite (クリストファ・アーマライト, Kurisutofa Āmaraito) is the leader of the elite army unit Obstinate Arrow. He is an expert fighter and wields a large battle axe that can be folded and concealed. Ordered to eliminate the Scrapped Princess, he kidnaps Winia Chester to lay a trap for Pacifica's guardians. Shannon beats him in a duel in Glass Canyon and asks him to stay away in exchange for sparing his life. After the Baroness is dismissed from commanding Obstinate Arrow, the team serves under the Major. Christopher arrests Pacifica then, but later helps her escape. After Providence is 'destroyed' and mankind is freed, he marries Winia and becomes good friends with the Casulls, while maintaining his friendship with Prince Forsyth.

==== Winia Chester ====
Voiced by: Ayako Kawasumi (Japanese); Michelle Ruff (English)
Winia Chester (ウイニア・チェスタ, Uinia Chesuta) is an introverted and lonesome inn-maid, taken in and raised by her uncle out of pity after her parents died. She spends time with and becomes friends with Pacifica, and it is one of the few times she has smiled and laughed since her parents were killed. When Christopher kidnaps her and takes her to the Glass Canyon, Pacifica's identity as the Scrapped Princess is revealed to her. Although initially confused and unable to accept the fact that her new friend is "the poison that will destroy the world", Winia eventually comes around, and continues to have a close friendship with Pacifica.

==== Leopold Scorpus ====
Voiced by: Takashi Kondō (Japanese); Yuri Lowenthal (English)
Leopold Scorpus (レオポルド・スコルプス, Reoporudo Sukorupusu), also known as Leo, is a clumsy but well-meaning traveling lordling who wishes to become a noble knight. He joins the Casull siblings after discovering them being "harassed" by a group of bandits. Utterly charmed by Pacifica, he vows to protect her and one day marry her. As the first son of Duke Scorpus and heir to his father's territory, he begins as an idealistic youth seeking to join the order of Amber Knights. After meeting the retired legendary knight Doyle Barrett, he begins to question the meaning of justice and chivalry, setting his quest to knighthood in second priority until he can finally discover for himself what chivalry truly is.

==== Kidaf Gillot the Silencer ====
Voiced by: Daisuke Ono (Japanese); Doug Erholtz (English)
Kidaf Gillot (キダーフ・ジャイロット, Kidāfu Jairotto) is a bard who tries his luck as a bounty hunter using his ability to command a group of poisonous BUGs with his instrument. His original intention was to use his BUGs to poison and kill Pacifica, but Raquel subdued him in order to collect the antidote from his cave. In awe of Raquel's devotion, Kidaf stopped going after the Scrapped Princess' bounty, and even agreed to help Pacifica find her siblings.

==== Prince Forsyth/Forsis ====
Voiced by: Junji Majima (Japanese); Dave Wittenberg (English)
Forsyth (フォルシス・ラインヴァン, Forushisu Rainvan) is the Crown Prince and biological twin brother of Pacifica. Unlike his father, the King, he has his people's welfare as top priority, and despises all unnecessary bloodshed meted to take out the Scrapped Princess. For this reason – the other being his physical resemblance to his mother and Pacifica – he is constantly at conflict with the King. At the end of the series, Forsyth kills Pacifica and himself to stop the prophecy from being fulfilled. He is revived from death when Pacifica 'destroys' Providence.

==== Princess Seness Giat ====
Voiced by: Yuki Matsuoka (Japanese); Wendee Lee (English)
"Beast" Princess of the Giat Empire, she is quite short-tempered, due to her harsh childhood, where people feared her, and she and Pacifica often argued after they met. She is a warrior princess skilled with her sword and magic, and manages to revive the giant floating fortress Skid used 5000 years ago in the Genesis Wars, with the help of the Dragoon, Natalie.

==== Fulle/Furet ====
Voiced by: Katsuyuki Konishi (Japanese); Liam O'Brien (English)
Fulle, eighteen years old, first appears after the spell Ginnungagap creates a destructive tidal wave. Pacifica, who was on a boat, washes up on an island with no memory of who she is. While she is staring at the ocean, Fulle is assessing the damage done to the city. Pacifica follows him home in hopes that she might run into someone who knows who she is. For the next couple of days, Pacifica, now named Pamela by Fulle for the time being, lives with Fulle enjoying what would be an everyday normal life. After some time, both Fulle and Pamela find out that her real name is Pacifica and that she is the Scrapped Princess. Fulle stays behind to keep the soldiers from getting any closer to Pacifica and is killed.

==== Zefiris (Serial Number 26) ====
Voiced by: Kaori Mizuhashi (Japanese); Kate Higgins (English)
Zefiris is a Dragoon who was used as a last resort plan to protect the Providence Breaker from the Peacemakers and is the last fully functioning Dragoon left. Solemn, calm and quiet, Zefiris first appears as a mysterious character who shows up whenever the Casulls are in trouble and often gives them helpful advice. Zefiris appears to be something like a cosmos guardian (Peacemaker) due to her strange abilities and unfazed demeanour. She takes Shannon as master and merges with him so he can become a D-Knight (D for Dragon or Dragoon) and combat the Peacemakers.

==== Cin ====
Voiced by: Tomoe Hanba (Japanese); Sandy Fox (English)
A young girl whom Shannon finds outside a town. She claims to have no parents, and said she was waiting for somebody, though she did not know who it was. She follows Shannon home. After a few strange occurrences involving her, Zefiris informs Pacifica that Cin is a Peacemaker in a compressed state (the human girl form) and, on top of that, an artillery type that can cancel out the Dragoons' presence. As if to prove this, as soon as Zefiris says that, Pacifica sees Zefiris disappearing, just as Cin walks into the room. As artillery types were powerful and dangerous, Cz was compressed as Cin to keep them in a more stable condition. Galil, it turns out, was supposed to pick Cz up at the bridge and release her true form, but was eliminated by Zefiris before he could.

==== Cz ====
Voiced by: Tomoe Hanba (Japanese); Julie Ann Taylor (English)
Cz is a Peacemaker and the true identity of Cin. She wears one of a pair of earring charms which Pacifica gave her when she was Cin, which she continues to wear even after reverting to her Peacemaker form. In the last episode, Cz is killed while protecting Shannon.

==== Celia/Seria Mauser ====
Voiced by: Fumiko Orikasa (Japanese); Michelle Ruff (English)
Celia is actually the Lord Mauser. 5000 years ago, she was a seer in the Genesis Wars, and could read the enemies' movements with great accuracy. With the combined powers of the Peacemakers (also known as the Valkyrie Type) and the Dragoons, humans were a formidable foe. However, in an effort to stop the war and so prevent her brother (a D-knight like Shannon - Zefiris was his Dragoon) and sister from dying Celia betrayed the humans. The effort was in vain though, as both of them died before the war ended. Celia's betrayal led to the brainwashing of the Peacemakers and humanity being sealed in the world called Providence. Celia has maintained her appearance from 5000 years ago in an artificial body.

==== Lord George Browning ====
5000 years ago, George Browning led 26 Dragoons, with their D-knights against the alien force – and later the Peacemakers – in an effort to defend humanity. In the 5000 years after the fall and sealing of humanity in Providence, he became a legend; just as Celia/Sillia became Lord Mauser, and the Peacemakers her Apostles, Lord Browning became known as the "Devil", while the faithful Dragoons were referred to as his "Demon servants".

==== Mr. Soopy/Soopy-kun ====
Mr. Soopy is a dragon mascot of a bakery. Originally, Pacifica wears the costume as a part-time advertising job but then gives the job to Leopold.

== Media ==
=== Light novel ===
The series, written by Ichiro Sakaki and illustrated by Yukinobu Azumi, was published from 1999 to 2003 in thirteen volumes. Five volumes of short story collections were published from 2002 to 2005. Between May and November 2007, first three of the original light novels have been released in English by Tokyopop.

The first volume was reviewed by April Spisak for the Bulletin of the Center for Children's Books. The reviewer criticized "cartoonish" manga illustration, and found the protagonists "flat, each stuck in their gendered roles", but expressed hope that the future volumes will be better, she also found the central premise, the "ethical questions involved in saving a loved one who might cause the deaths of multitudes", a deep one that the readers may ponder for a long time. It was also reviewed for IGN.

=== Manga ===
The manga adaptation illustrated by Yabuki Go was published from 2002 to 2004 and collected into three volumes. It has also been published in the US by Tokyopop between August 2005 and May 2006. The manga has no plot overlap with the anime adaptation; the only things in common are the three main characters, the idea of the Scrapped Princess, and the Mauser Faith they are running from. Another one-volume manga, illustrated by Megumi Ikeda, Scrapped Princess Su Thep, was released on May 28, 2003.

Another three-volume manga adaptation illustrated by Toshinori Sogabe was published from 2016 to 2018 in Famitsu Comic Clear online magazine.

=== Anime ===
The 24-episode anime adaptation by studio Bones aired from April to October 2003. The anime was originally distributed in the United States by Bandai Entertainment, but was later picked up by Funimation.

The anime was reviewed by THEM Anime Reviews, where it was awarded a score four out of five. It was also reviewed for Anime News Network, where it received a grade of A−.

=== Game ===
A role-playing game titled Scrapped Princess RPG and set in the Scrapped Princess universe was released in 2003. It is based on the Sword World RPG system. Kazuhito Kuroda (group SNE) is the main designer. It was released as a paperback version from Fujimi Shobo in 2003. The book has the ISBN 4-8291-4387-8.

== Reception ==
The reviewer at THEM Anime Reviews awarded it 4 stars out of 5, writing that "Scrapped Princess is a rare gem in the fantasy anime genre", with a well-designed world, good cast of characters, and believable incorporation of lost technology into a fantasy setting. The show received several reviews at Anime News Network. The review of the complete series notes that despite minor flaws with animation and fight scenes, "its characters, its sentiment, its fine balancing of action, comedy, drama, and philosophizing, and its sense of the helplessness of being caught up in events far beyond your understanding – are timeless factors sufficiently well-crafted that the series not only stand up well 14 years later but may have even gotten better with time", awarding it the score of A−.

The anime's entry in The Encyclopedia of Science Fiction notes that: "One of the earliest major anime adaptations of a light novel series, Scrapped Princess demonstrated that a multi-volume source could be distilled into a largely self-contained story within a single 24-episode season. The show occupies a transitional place in early twenty-first-century animation, bridging late-20th-century high-fantasy traditions, such as Record of Lodoss War (1990-1991), and the hybridized science-fantasy isekai narratives that later proliferated. In the anime SF Megatext, it remains a notable example of the hidden-SF-world-within-fantasy format, exploiting and then subverting Fantasy genre conventions through its revelation of a Dystopian Post-Holocaust reality.
