= Zone of the Enders: 2167 Idolo =

2001 film by Tetsuya Watanabe

- ZOE: 2167 IDOLO
- Genre: Drama, Mecha, Military, Romance
- Original video animation
- Directed by: Tetsuya Watanabe
- Written by: Shin Yoshida
- Music by: Masumi Itō
- Studio: Sunrise
- Licensed by: NA: Discotek Media
- Released: March 1, 2001
- Runtime: 55 minutes

Zone of the Enders: 2167 Idolo is a Japanese anime original video animation, set as a prequel to the original Zone of the Enders game. It serves to explain the war between Earth and Mars, and the origin of the Orbital Frame technology. The events also lead into the TV series Z.O.E. Dolores, I.

In the English dub of the movie, BAHRAM is called Bafram. It is also called this in the art gallery in the special features. However, this is most likely a translation error.

== Story ==
The Deimos Affair

The story starts off by introducing the main character; Radium Lavans, a reckless Phantoma LEV pilot in the BAHRAM military forces. His comrade is the skilled Viola. The plot quickly introduces them having a hate for Earth as people who live on Mars are ridiculed and outcast by Earth people. These Terran feelings of superiority presumably spring from Martian colonists' weaker physical abilities and size - a side effect of the planet's lower gravity - combined with traditional colonial prejudices. It is evident there is an ongoing under the table conflict, and BAHRAM is involved with liberating the tight Federation grasp of Earth.

Radium and Viola are soon chosen to be test pilots for a new vehicle being developed by BAHRAM called the Orbital Frame. The prototype, dubbed Idolo, is revealed that it is far superior to any existing vehicle in possession of Earth and Mars. The speed, agility, and power far exceeds the strongest LEV units. However, all of this is thanks to the discovery of the powerful material called Metatron. Metatron was used to create most of Idolo, which gave the orbital frame enhanced abilities. Radium was the one who piloted Idolo most often, though he was at first overwhelmed by Idolo's immense power output. After much practice, Radium is able to efficiently pilot Idolo. However, it seemed that Idolo had developed a "will" of its own, and chose Radium to be its runner (this becomes apparent when Viola tries to pilot Idolo; Idolo refuses all of Viola's commands). It becomes known that piloting Idolo is having an adverse effect on Radium's mind, changing him into a mindless killer while he's running Idolo. During a demonstration for Mars' military leaders, Radium exhibits the full power of Idolo, revealing the Homing Laser, an attack that fires hundreds of thin lasers that home in on their targets, and the extremely destructive Burst Shot in addition to showing exceptional prowess when using the normal shot and Idolo's arm blade. Radium finds a group of Earth spies and captures one and kills the other. A group of Earth spies infiltrates the test facility and they kidnap Dr. Links and Dolores. Radium follows their shuttle to Deimos Station with Idolo with the intent of rescuing Dolores and Dr. Links. After slicing all of the Space Force LEVs in two, Radium finds Dr. Links and Dolores, but their kidnapper offers Dr. Links a deal to work with them and continue her research, but she refuses. While trying to leave, the Space Force spy tries to shoot Dr. Links, but Dolores pushes her away and is shot instead.

Sensing Radium's devastation of the death of Dolores, Idolo goes into a combat auto-pilot mode, which begins to dispatch the arriving Space LEV forces. During the combat, Idolo is hit from behind, resulting in its wings being ripped off. BAHRAM LEVs arrive and join forces with the Space Forces LEVs, with the objective of destroying Idolo, so that the Orbital Frame technology will not be captured. While all this is happening, Radium is in a church, marrying Dolores, as he puts the ring on her finger applause is heard from the empty church and he begins to walk out happy with Dolores in his arms, as this is what he wished for. Viola arrives and Radium is glad she made it in time. Viola tells Radium that all this is not really happening, he is hallucinating, and Dolores is really dead. In his dream state, Dolores turns to Viola and raises her hand, which causes her to retreat in fear, to the unaware and shock of Radium. In the real world, Idolo is preparing to use a burst shot on the surrounding LEVs. Before it can launch it, all of the LEVs fire on Idolo, engulfing it, which rips off each limb part. Radium is apparently killed, and Idolo is incapacitated with many LEVs surrounding the downed Frame.

The movies ends with an epilogue set in 2172. Viola is seen piloting her Orbital Frame, Neith, and flying towards Antilia Colony, the setting of the first Zone of the Enders game.

== Influences ==
All of the Z.O.E. franchise - and indeed all of Kojima's works - were influenced to one degree or another by works of anime and manga from the 70s and 80s - especially those in the mecha genre - with the Mobile Suit Gundam franchise being paramount. The Idolo OVA in particular illustrates this, as it examines the concepts of colonialism and independence in outer space best illustrated by Gundam. Some would go as far to say that it is allegoric of the classic series, but this is an overstatement, as many key plot elements differ greatly. It also must be said that Idolo was produced by Sunrise in partnership with Konami, and that Mobile Suit Gundam is considered Sunrise's flagship franchise. All of which were born from early science fiction anthologies and books from before Anime was ever popularized on TV.

== Characters ==
Dolores Hayes
Occupation: OF R&D Assistant
Description: Assistant to Dr. Rachel Links and girlfriend to Radium.

Edgar
Occupation: Bahram Soldier (Colonel)

Dr. Rachel Links
Occupation: OF R&D Scientist
Description: One of the early Lead developers to Orbital Frame technology, and one who oddly does not have much impact beyond the anime. She was also known as having a hand in developing the AI's housed in the OF's.

Rachel's husband, James, and their children Leon and Noel appear in Z.O.E. Dolores, I.

Melissa
Occupation: OF R&D Assistant

Radium Levans
Occupation: BAHRAM Soldier (Lieutenant)
Description: A LEV pilot who was noted for his skill in combat, was transferred to test the new Martian weapon; an Orbital Frame. Suffered from Metatron poisoning.

William
Occupation: BAHRAM Soldier

Viola
Occupation: BAHRAM Soldier
Description: Radium is her only and closest friend, which she hides a love for. Her only devotion is the military as she lost everything to the UNSF. In the first game Radium is called Radam, her lost lover

== Mechanics ==
Idolo
Class: Prototype Orbital Frame
Purpose: General
Piloted By: Radium Lavans
Weapons: Primary - Arm Cannon, Sword, Homing Laser, Burst Attack
Sub Weapons: Halberd

Phantoma
Class: LEV
Purpose: General
Piloted By: BAHRAM, UNSF
Weapons: Vulcan Machine Gun, Smoke Grenade
Alternative Weapons: Laser Rifle

== Trivia ==
- There is some degree of confusion pertaining to the real name of Radium. In first Zone of the Enders game for PlayStation 2, Viola mentions him but uses the name "Radam". It is never made clear whether the game or the anime use the correct name. This moment also marks the first time that events in the anime have ever been mentioned in the console games.

== Reception ==
Helen McCarthy in 500 Essential Anime Movies states that Idolo "links political and personal issues, focusing on adult problems" and it is "well-paced with a nice balance of plot, character development, and adventure, making its one of the best science fiction anime of its day".
