= Oranges & Lemons (band) =

Japanese music group

- Genres: Anison
- Label: Lantis
- Members: Masumi Itō; Yōko Ueno

Oranges & Lemons is a Japanese band formed by a duo of music composers and performers, Masumi Itō and Yōko Ueno. The duo is most notable for performing the opening theme ("Soramimi Cake"), and closing theme ("Raspberry Heaven") to the anime television series Azumanga Daioh.

Itō and Ueno, still under the title of 'Oranges & Lemons' also performed the album Tribute to Azumanga Daioh in which they sang multiple songs based on the music from the series. This album is notable because it not only contains an alternate 'softer' version of "Soramimi Cake" (Cake of Mishearing) but also an a cappella version of "Raspberry Heaven".

Itō and Ueno also sing "Daichi no La-li-la" (大地のla-li-la; literally "La-li-la of the Earth") together, the ending theme to the anime Scrapped Princess, although not under the band name Oranges & Lemons.

== Works ==
=== Singles ===
Soramimi Cake/Raspberry Heaven / Released April 22, 2002
#	Title	Lyrics	Composition	Arrangement	Tie-up
1	Soramimi Cake	Hata Aki	Ito Masumi		Opening theme song for the TV anime Azumanga Daioh
2	Raspberry Heaven	Hata Aki	Ueno Yoko		Ending theme song for the TV anime Azumanga Daioh
3	Soramimi Cake (off vocal)				
4	Raspberry heaven (off vocal)				

Daichi no la-li-la / Released on May 21, 2003
#	Title	Lyrics	Composition	Arrangement	Tie-up
1	Daichi no la-li-la	Hata Aki	Ueno Yoko		Ending theme song for the TV anime Scrapped Princess
2	HO・LA HO・RI Saga	Hata Aki	Ito Masumi		Image song for the TV anime Scrapped Princess
3	Daichi no la-li-la (off vocal)				
4	HO・LA HO・RI Saga (off vocal)				

=== Project album ===
Tribute to Azumanga Daioh / Released October 2, 2002
#	Title	Lyrics	Composition	Arrangement
1	Soramimi Cake (Tribute Version)	Hata Aki	Ito Masumi	Kurihara Masaki
2	Kaze no Iro March	Hata Aki	Kurihara Masami	
3	Star Glasses	Hata Aki	Kurihara Masami	
4	Walnuts Crackling in the Blue Sky	Hata Aki	Ueno Yoko	
5	What's the meaning (Ice Crossroads Edition)	Hata Aki	Kurihara Masami	Ueno Yoko
6	Wind Color March (reprise)		Kurihara Masami	Oranges & Lemons
7	moi moi	Hata Aki	Kurihara Masami	
8	Weepin' rains	Hata Aki	Kurihara Masaki	Ito Masumi
9	Morning Glow Railroad	Hata Aki	Kurihara Masaki	
10	Raspberry heaven (Tribute Version)	Hata Aki	Ueno Yoko	

Sacred Yearning ~Haibane Renmei Image Song Collection~ / Released February 5, 2003
#	Title	Lyrics	Composition	Arrangement	Songs
1	Sacred Longing (instrumental)		Otani Yuki	Ito Masumi	Ueno Yoko・Ito Masumi
2	Lost Bird ~theme of Rakka~	Hata Aki	Ito Masumi		Ito Masumi
3	Forgetful Water ~theme of Kana~	Hata Aki	Ueno Yoko		Ueno Yoko
4	Where the Undiscovered World Is ~theme of Hikari~	Hata Aki	Ueno Yoko		Ueno Yoko
5	Path to the Sky (instrumental)		Masumi Ito		
6	Let's go back to tomorrow	Aki Hata	Masumi Ito		Masumi Ito
7	Thank you to the sky ~theme of Kuu~	Aki Hata	Masumi Ito		Masumi Ito
8	You are far away (instrumental)		Yoko Ueno		
9	Become a burning stone ~theme of Reki~	Aki Hata	Sachi Otani	Yoko Ueno	Yoko Ueno
10	free bird ~To the midday moon~	Aki Hata	Sachi Otani	Yoko Ueno	Yoko Ueno & Masumi Ito
