= Masumi Itō =

Japanese singer and composer

Masumi Itō 伊藤 真澄
- Also known as: Hikaru Nanase (七瀬 光)
- Born: Hitachi, Ibaraki, Japan
- Genres: J-pop, orchestral
- Occupations: Singer, songwriter, composer, arranger
- Instruments: Piano, vocals, glockenspiel
- Years active: 1998–present
- Label: Lantis
- Website: masumi-itou.com

Masumi Itō (伊藤 真澄, Itō Masumi; born 21 May) (she also goes by the pseudonym Hikaru Nanase (七瀬 光, Nanase Hikaru)) is a Japanese singer and composer from Ibaraki prefecture in Japan. Itō has composed the soundtracks to many anime television shows and is part of the bands Oranges & Lemons and Heart of Air.

== Discography ==
=== Solo works ===
==== Singles ====
- 2001: "Hitomi no Naka ni" — PS game Sister Princess: Pure Stories theme song)
- 2003: "Yasashii Ai no Hane/Nemunemu Tenshi" — anime television series Angel Tales opening & ending theme)
- 2004: "Futari Dakara" — anime television series Koi Kaze ending theme
- 2005: "Shōnen Humming" — anime television series Absolute Boy ending theme

==== Albums ====
- 1997: Waste days [From METAL BLACK -The First-]
- 1998: Door: Drifting Souls
- 2001: Hana no Oto
- 2003: Yumefuru Mori e
- 2004: Harmonies of heaven
- 2012: Wonder wonderful

==== Other ====
- 2001: anime television series Gyoten ningen batseelor theme song single – ending theme "Mahō no Kotoba"
- 2003: PS2 game Primopuel: Oshaberi Heartner theme song single — image song "Otsukisama to Rururu"
- 2006: PS2 game Binchotan: Shiawase-goyomi theme song single – ending theme "Ashita no Hanakago"

=== Group works ===
==== Heart of Air ====
- 2001: Kiss Me Sunlights — PS2 game ZOE opening theme
- 2001: Ring on the World — anime television series Z.O.E Dolores,i ending theme
- 2002: Blue Flow — anime television series Haibane Renmei ending theme

==== Masumi Ito and Yoko Ueno ====
- 2003: Haibane Renmei Image Album: Seinaru Doukei
- 2003: Daichi no la-li-la — anime television series Scrapped Princess ending theme

==== Mariaria ====
- 2006: Aru Hi no Kamisama — includes anime television series Nishi no Yoki Majo: Astraea Testament ending theme "Kanata"

=== Soundtracks ===
==== TV animation ====
- Space Pirate Mito series (1999)
- Super Gals! Kotobuki Ran (2001)
- Z.O.E. Dolores, I (2001)
- Galaxy Angel series (2001, 2002, 2003, 2004)
- Magical Nyan Nyan Taruto (2001)
- Pita-Ten (2002)
- Azumanga Daioh (2002 – song performance & composition for character songs only)
- Chōjūshin Gravion series (2002, 2004)
- Scrapped Princess (2003)
- Da Capo (2003 – with Yugo Kanno)
- Chrono Crusade (2003)
- Absolute Boy (2005)
- D.C.S.S.: Da Capo Second Season (2005)
- Gunparade Orchestra (2005 – with Masayoshi Yoshikawa)
- Noein: Mou Hitori no Kimi e (2005)
- Kagihime Monogatari Eikyū Alice Rondo (2006)
- Tactical Roar (2006)
- Nishi no Yoki Majo: Astraea Testament (2006)
- Koisuru Tenshi Angelique series (2006, 2007)
- Gift: Eternal Rainbow (2006)
- Venus Versus Virus (2007)
- Shinkyoku Sōkai Polyphonica (2007)
- KimiKiss pure rouge (2007 – with Yokoyama Masaru & Iwadare Noriyuki)
- Shigofumi (2008)
- Phantom: Requiem for the Phantom (2009)
- Canaan (2009)
- Infinite Stratos (2011)
- Hiiro no Kakera (2012)
- Jinrui wa Suitai Shimashita (2012)
- Beyond the Boundary (2013)
- RDG: Red Data Girl (2013) (with Myu)
- She and Her Cat: Everything Flows (2016) (part of TO-MAS Soundsight Fluorescent Forest with Yohei Matsui and Mito)
- Flip Flappers (2016) (part of TO-MAS Soundsight Fluorescent Forest)
- Alice & Zouroku (2017) (part of TO-MAS)
- Miss Kobayashi's Dragon Maid (2017)

==== Original video animation (OVA) ====
- Angelique: Shiroi Tsubasa no Memoir (2000)
- Angel Sanctuary (2000)
- éX-Driver (2000)
- Angelique: Seichi yori Ai o Komete (2001)
- ZOE: 2167 IDOLO (2001)
- Ichigo 100% (2004, 2005)
- Book Girl OVA series (2009–2010)

==== Film ====
- éX-Drive The Movie (2002)
- Book Girl (2010)
- Broken Blade (2010–2011: opening theme song arrangement with Kokia)
- Beyond the Boundary -I'LL BE HERE- Past (2015)
- Beyond the Boundary -I'LL BE HERE- Future (2015)
