= Z.O.E. Dolores, I =

2001 Japanese anime series

- Genre: Adventure, Comedy, Mecha, Military
- Created by: Konami Computer Entertainment Japan
- Anime television series
- Directed by: Tetsuya Watanabe
- Written by: Shin Yoshida
- Music by: Masumi Itō
- Studio: Sunrise
- Licensed by: NA: Discotek Media
- Original network: Animax; AT-X
- Original run: 7 April 2001 – 29 September 2001
- Episodes: 26
- Related works
- Zone of the Enders: 2167 Idolo

Z.O.E. Dolores, I is a Japanese anime television series set in the Zone of the Enders universe. The television series was produced by Sunrise, aired from 7 April – 29 September 2001, spanning a total of 26 episodes.

== Plot ==
The events of the story take place 5 years after Zone of the Enders: 2167 Idolo, the events of which are referred to as the "Deimos Affair". The first twelve episodes take place before the events of the first game (Zone of the Enders), while the rest of the series takes place after.

The story centers around a space cargo transporter named James Links, his family, and their adventures in the Zone of the Enders universe.

The events of the story are set in motion when James is sent a mysterious Orbital Frame called Dolores (a.k.a. ISIS) with instructions to deliver it to Earth and not to let anyone capture it. During the series, James attempts to reconnect with his adult children, Leon and Noel, as well as search for his long-lost (and reportedly dead) wife Rachel. The intelligent, well-mannered and well-meaning, but somewhat awkward and naive Dolores accompanies him as many enemies attempt to stop him, manipulate him, or capture Dolores.

== Characters ==
- James Links: A misfortuned space-trucker who gets his hands on something that he does not really want, but which is intensely desired by nearly everyone else: the Orbital Frame called Dolores. He's rather naïve and blunt when dealing with his family, although he's very dedicated to them, valiantly trying to uphold "family values." A UNSF veteran, his piloting and battle skills are remarkable. He is also remarkably resourceful. He is married to a Martian, Rachel Links, but was separated from her when she left to work on Mars. He does not believe there are differences between Martians and Earthlings, unlike most UNSF officers shown in ZOE universe. Voiced by Tesshō Genda in Japanese.
- Noel Links: James's daughter, she works as a construction worker on Earth. Though she sometimes cannot understand her father's antics, she is more accepting of him than her brother is. She is dependable and mechanically skillful. Voiced by Narumi Hidaka in Japanese.
- Leon Links: James's son, he works as programmer for a large firm before the events of the series. He despises his father because of problems he causes, and especially for leaving his mother. He is somewhat cowardly and less self-assured than his sister. He also displays hints of an Oedipus complex. Voiced by Mitsuru Miyamoto in Japanese.
- Dolores (A.I.): Orbital Frame Dolores' A.I. Unlike ADA (Jehuty's AI), who was designed as an efficient combat assistant, she is apparently designed to act like a well-behaved child. Her programming recognizes James as her "Uncle" (Ojii-sama), and she admires him and his value. James, though a little awkward at first, finally accepts her and treats her like his own children. Among her few memories is a lullaby only known by the Links family- this memory is what drives James to renew the search for his wife. Voiced by Houko Kuwashima in Japanese.
- Rachel Stewart Links: James's wife, reportedly dead, and chief designer of Idolo, Dolores/Isis, and Hathor. Though she loved James, her dedication to her countrymen on Mars caused her to leave him. She believed that her skills and knowledge could help Mars to gain independence from Earth's oppression. A little naïve at times, not unlike her husband. Voiced by Yoshiko Sakakibara in Japanese.
- Pete: The Link's family cat, a kitten bought for Noel's birthday present by James. Strangely enough, he is never once called by name in the English dub. The characters refer to him simply as "kitty" or other synonymous phrases.
- Napth Pleminger: A businessman, he uses his appearance as cover to hide his secret identity as BAHRAM military leader. He has reasons for hating the UNSF.

In truth, Napth is in fact Radium Lavans, the pilot of the first Orbital frame, and the fiancée of Dolores Hayes. After the Deimos incident, he was resurrected and rebuilt into a cyborg by BAHRAM. Voiced by Takehito Koyasu in Japanese.

- Rebecca Hunter: A young BAHRAM pilot (fifteen years old) who is captured by James during their fight on Mars. She is a rather intense person, although somewhat naïve and inexperienced with life in general. As she has been indoctrinated to consider every Earthling as enemy, she feels uneasiness that James actually treats her kindly. Although a skilled pilot, her lack of experience is apparent when fighting James. She loves her adopted father/ commander Napth Pleminger very much, and accepts everything he says as truth. Voiced by Yumiko Nakanishi in Japanese and Jessica Robertson in English.
- Baan Dorfloum: A high-ranking officer, and a racist who thinks Martians (Enders) "stink, should not exist." He chases the fugitive Links family far and wide, always addressing James Links as "John Carter". Though he primarily he is quite ruthless and probably insane. Voiced by Chō in Japanese.
- Sameggi: An officer and Baan's assistant. Though he admires his superior to some extent, Baan's racist views and his increasingly alarming antics force him to reconsider. Voiced by Fumihiko Tachiki in Japanese.
- Cindy Fiorentino: An Earthling journalist reporting about poor conditions in Mars, she fancies herself a courageous reporter who will stop at nothing to get "exciting" news. Voiced by Rumi Ochiai in Japanese.
- Raiah: A self-proclaimed "Mars 1st" broker, he is the one who asks James to deliver a mystery package in the first episode. The mystery client specifically requested James for the job. The Links family eventually encounter him again on Mars. Voiced by Kozo Shioya in Japanese.
- ISIS (A.I.): Dolores' "other" personality. It is much more brutal and capable than Dolores, fighting until all enemy units are damaged or killed, and displaying no emotion or other interests all the while. It is only dominant over Dolores's normal personality when she is in mortal danger.

== Episodes ==
1. "James' Misfortune"
2. "Elevator of Capital Punishment"
3. "Leon's Choice"
4. "Final Countdown"
5. "A Runaway Trip to Death"
6. "Get Away"
7. "Untouchable"
8. "The Grave of Humanity"
9. "Lost in Space"
10. "Total Recall"
11. "Tight Rope"
12. "Die Hard"
13. "Red Desert"
14. "Rebecca"
15. "Container for Sand"
16. "Massive Illusion"
17. "Family Game"
18. "Showdown at Noon"
19. "The Time of Reunion"
20. "Upheaval"
21. "Set Course for North North West"
22. "Clash"
23. "Goodbye Mars"
24. "Vanishing Point"
25. "Sorrowing Angel"
26. "Farewell to Arms"

== See also ==
- List of television shows based on video games
