= Rumi Ochiai =

Japanese actress and voice actress

- 落合 るみ
- Born: Aichi Prefecture, Japan
- Education: Yokohama Seiryo High School
- Occupations: Actress; voice actress
- Years active: 1990–present
- Agent: Theatre Company Subaru

Rumi Ochiai (落合 るみ, Ochiai Rumi) is a Japanese actress and voice actress from Aichi Prefecture, Japan. She is currently affiliated with Theatre Company Subaru. After the death of Sumiko Shirakawa in 2015, she took over her role as Hiroshi Nakajima in Sazae-san. She is best known as being the Japanese voice of Rouge the Bat in the Sonic franchise, since the character's introduction in Sonic Adventure 2.

== Biography ==
Ochiai was raised in Kanazawa, Nishinomiya and Yokohama and graduated from Yokohama Seiryo High School. She owns a dog named Lomé (ロメ).

== Filmography ==
- Shaman King (Sharona)
- Z.O.E. Dolores, I (Cindy Fiorentino)
- Sonic the Hedgehog games, Sonic X (Rouge the Bat)
- Naruto (Kurenai Yuhi)
- Naruto: Shippuden (Kurenai Yuhi)
- Fullmetal Alchemist (Marin's Mama)
- Ragnarok The Animation (Melopsum)
- Mao Dante (Lamia)
- Boruto: Naruto Next Generations (Kurenai Sarutobi)

== Video games ==
- Sonic the Hedgehog series – Rouge the Bat (2001–present)

== Dubbing ==
- Catch Me If You Can (Brenda Strong (Amy Adams))
- Criminal Minds: Suspect Behavior (Gina LaSalle (Beau Garrett))
- The Family Stone (Amy Stone (Rachel McAdams))
- Final Destination (Terry Chaney (Amanda Detmer))
- The Karate Kid Part III (Jessica Andrews (Robyn Lively))
- The Master (Peggy Dodd (Amy Adams))
- Midnight in Paris (Inez (Rachel McAdams))
- The Prince & Me (Paige Morgan (Julia Stiles))
- Same Kind of Different as Me (Deborah Hall (Renée Zellweger))
- Spin City (Ashley Schaeffer (Carla Gugino))
- Triangle (Sally (Rachael Carpani))
- Wonder Woman 1984 (Barbara Ann Minerva / Cheetah (Kristen Wiig))
- You, Me and Dupree (Molly Thompson Peterson (Kate Hudson))
