= Nellie Bellflower =

American actress and voice artist

- Occupations: Actress, voice artist, producer
- Years active: 1969–present
- Known for: Numerous guest appearances on TV shows which include Happy Days, Barnaby Jones and voice of Princess Ariel in the animated TV series Thundarr the Barbarian
- Spouse: Michael Mislove

Nellie Bellflower is an American actress, voice artist, and producer.

== Career ==
Bellflower provided the voice of Princess Ariel in the Ruby-Spears animated television series Thundarr the Barbarian. She was also a voice actress for The Last Unicorn and The Return of the King. She acted in Americathon, the miniseries East of Eden, and she also played guest roles on various TV series such as Barnaby Jones, Barney Miller, Starsky & Hutch, and Happy Days (as Fonzie's ex-fiancée Maureen Johnson, in the Season 2 episode "Fonzie's Getting Married".

Nellie has been involved in movie production with three projects: The Girl in Melanie Klein (2008), Miss Pettigrew Lives for a Day (2008) and Finding Neverland (2004), for which she was nominated for an Academy Award as Producer for Best Picture.

== Personal life ==
Bellflower is married to Michael Mislove.

== Filmography ==
=== Film ===
| Year | Title | Role | Notes |
|---|---|---|---|
| 1976 | Tunnel Vision | Girl / Mrs. Pat Borzak / Announcer | |
| 1979 | Americathon | Missy, VP Advertising | |
| 1982 | The Flight of Dragons | Danielle | Voice |
| 1982 | The Last Unicorn | Princess Alison Jocelyn (scene deleted) | Voice |

=== Television ===
| Year | Title | Role | Notes |
|---|---|---|---|
| 1974 | The Girl with Something Extra | Denise | Episode: "The Cost of Giving" |
| 1974 | Gunsmoke | Sally | Episode: "Cowtown Hustler" |
| 1975 | Happy Days | Maureen Johnson | Episode: "Fonzie's Getting Married" |
| 1975 | Doc | Mary Ellen | Episode: "Dog vs. Doc" |
| 1975 | Police Woman | Laurene | Episode: "Blaze of Glory" |
| 1975 | Barney Miller | Officer Carney | Episode: "Hot Dogs" |
| 1976 | Starsky & Hutch | Sweet Alice | 2 episodes |
| 1976 | You're Just Like Your Father | Cheryl Toffler | Television film |
| 1977 | The Father Knows Best Reunion | Marybeth | Television film |
| 1979 | Visions | Laurene | Episode: "Ladies in Waiting" |
| 1979 | Barnaby Jones | Peggy Whittaker | Episode: "The Enslaved" |
| 1979 | Rendezvous Hotel | Sherry Leonard | Television film |
| 1979 | Rudolph and Frosty's Christmas in July | Lady Boreal | Voice, television film |
| 1980 | The Return of the King | Eowyn / Dernhelm | Voice, television film |
| 1980 | Thundarr the Barbarian | Various roles | 21 episodes |
| 1981 | East of Eden | Mrs. Trask | 3 episodes |
| 1983 | Night Partners | Battered Wife | Television film |
