= Yoko Ueno =

Japanese singer

Yoko Ueno 上野 洋子
- Born: October 11, 1963 (age 62)
- Occupation: Singer
- Instrument: Vocals
- Member of: Oranges & Lemons

Yoko Ueno (上野 洋子, Ueno Yōko; Born October 11, 1963) is a Japanese recording artist. She has performed in the bands, Oranges & Lemons, Vita Nova, Marsh-Mallow, and Zabadak.

== Discography ==
=== CDs ===
- "Voices" (December 5, 1993 Biosphere Records)
- "Nursery Chimes" (ナーサリーチャイムス)(May 25, 1997 NTT Pub.)
- "*1" (January 23, 2002 Toera Records)
- "Puzzle" (January 23, 2002 Victor Entertainment)
- "SSS -Simply Sing Songs-" (July 24, 2003 Nippon Crown)
- "Shizen Genshō"(自然現象(means "Natural Phenomena")) (May 25, 2005 Nippon Crown)
- "*2" (December 6, 2006 Toera records)
- "YK20[audio]"(上野洋子 デビュー20周年記念ライヴ"YK20"~20周年につき初ソロ~) (March 4, 2007 tilde disc)
- "Tokyo Humming" (September 10, 2008 Geneon)

=== Remix CD ===
- "Yoko Ueno e-mix" (March 25, 1996 Biosphere Records)

=== DVDs ===
- "YK20[visual]" (上野洋子 デビュー20周年記念ライヴ"YK20"~20周年につき初ソロ~) (March 25, 2007 tilde disc)

=== Soundtracks ===
- "Brigadoon Marin-To-Meran" Original Sound Track 2 (January 24, 2001 Victor Entertainment)
- ".hack// tasogare-no-yubiwa-densetsu" original sound track (February 21, 2003 Victor Entertainment)
- "Gamera: Chĩsaki Yusha-Tachi (Gamera the Brave)" Original Motion Picture Soundtrack (March 26, 2006 avex trax)
- "Dolphin-Blue~Fuji, Mouichido-sora-e/Churaumi~Okinawa Churaumi-suizokukan-e-no-shõtai" (July 4, 2007 tilde disc)
