= Megatext =

Theoretical term in the study of speculative fiction

Megatext is a term used by scholars of speculative fiction that describes the elaborate fictional background, tropes, images, and conventions that science fiction or fantasy narratives share.

== History ==
This collective body of knowledge, utilized by writers and recognized by readers, was first described by Christine Brooke-Rose in her 1981 work, A Rhetoric of the Unreal: Studies in Narrative and Structure, Especially of the Fantastic. Brooke-Rose builds on the culture or referential code first described by Roland Barthes in his work S/Z.

== Background ==
Brooke-Rose describes a subconsciously familiar set of images, attributes and ideas that are shared within a particular genre. She cites examples in several genres, but goes into critical detail when considering fantasy, specifically the work of J. R. R. Tolkien.

Damien Broderick builds on this concept, separating Brooke-Rose's criticism of Tolkien and the specific exposition in Tolkien's work, from the megatext concept itself and introducing other comparable science fiction theories, such as the work of Gary K. Wolfe in The Known and the Unknown: The Iconography of Science Fiction. The "mega-text" in Broderick's description is much more clearly identified as a shared cultural experience and interaction between writer and reader.

In his essay "The Evolving Megatext of Fantasy" Allen Stroud identifies the distinction between the author's specific fictional world mythos (macrotext or world bible) and the way in which the megatext of fantasy has changed, spreading out across multiple media to incorporate many shared concepts into hundreds of different fictions. Stroud notes that many of these concepts are stripped of their cultural origins in their new forms, relying instead on more popular contemporary images and archetypes.

== Sources ==
- Introduction to The Norton Book of Science Fiction by Ursula Le Guin. 1993.
- Science Fiction: The New Critical Idiom by Adam Roberts. 2000.
- "Megatext". The Encyclopedia of Science Fiction.
