= Azumanga Daioh =

Manga by Kiyohiko Azuma

- Cover of the first tankōbon volume, featuring from left to right: Sakaki, Chiyo, Tomo, Yomi, and Osaka

あずまんが大王 (Azumanga Daiō)
- Genre: Slice of life; Surreal comedy
- Manga
- Written by: Kiyohiko Azuma
- Published by: MediaWorks; Shogakukan (re-release)
- English publisher: NA: Yen Press; ADV Manga (former)
- Magazine: Dengeki Daioh
- Original run: February 1999 – May 2002
- Volumes: 4
- Original net animation

Azumanga Web Daioh
- Directed by: Fumiaki Asano
- Music by: Motokazu Shinoda
- Studio: Ajiado
- Released: December 28, 2000
- Runtime: 4 minutes
- Anime film

Azumanga Daioh: The Very Very Short Movie
- Directed by: Hiroshi Nishikiori
- Studio: J.C.Staff
- Released: December 22, 2001
- Runtime: 6 minutes
- Anime television series

Azumanga Daioh: The Animation
- Directed by: Hiroshi Nishikiori
- Produced by: Shinichi Ikeda; Nobuhiro Osawa; Yuji Matsukura
- Written by: Ichirō Ōkouchi
- Music by: Masaki Kurihara
- Studio: J.C.Staff
- Licensed by: AUS: Madman Entertainment; NA: Sentai Filmworks; UK: ADV Films (former)
- Original network: TV Tokyo
- English network: SEA: Animax Asia; UK: Propeller TV; US: Anime Network
- Original run: April 8, 2002 – September 30, 2002
- Episodes: 26 (130 segments)
- Related works
- Yotsuba&!
- icon

Azumanga Daioh (Japanese: あずまんが大王, Hepburn: Azumanga Daiō) is a Japanese yonkoma manga series written and illustrated by Kiyohiko Azuma. It was serialized from February 1999 to May 2002 in the monthly magazine Dengeki Daioh by MediaWorks; three additional chapters were published in Shogakukan's Monthly Shōnen Sunday in May 2009 to celebrate the manga's tenth anniversary. The manga was first released in English by ADV Manga, and later re-issued by Yen Press.

An anime television adaptation titled Azumanga Daioh: The Animation was produced by J.C.Staff and aired in Japan between April and September 2002, consisting of 130 four-minute segments compiled into 26 episodes. The compiled episodes were released on DVD and Universal Media Discs (UMDs) by Starchild Records, and an English-language version was produced by ADV Films. Before the series, a theatrical short and an original net animation were also produced. Several soundtrack albums were released, as well as three video games.

Both the manga and anime series adaptation have been praised for their humor driven by eccentric characters, with Azuma acclaimed as a "master of the four-panel form" for both his art style and comic timing.

== Premise ==
Azumanga Daioh chronicles the everyday life in an unnamed Japanese high school of six girls: child prodigy Chiyo Mihama and her struggle to fit in with girls five years older; reserved Sakaki and her obsession with cute animals while certain ones seem to hate her; spacey Ayumu "Osaka" Kasuga with a skewed perspective on the world; Koyomi "Yomi" Mizuhara's aggravation at an annoying best friend; Tomo Takino, whose energy is rivaled only by her lack of sense; sporty Kagura and her one-sided athletics rivalry with Sakaki.

Secondary characters include homeroom teacher Yukari Tanizaki, her friend, physical education teacher Minamo "Nyamo" Kurosawa, and the creepy classical literature teacher Kimura. The story covers three years of tests, talking between classes, culture festivals, and athletic events at school, as well as time spent traveling to and from school, studying at Chiyo's house, and vacations at Chiyo's summer beach home and the fictional theme park Magical Land, concluding with the graduation of the main cast. It is generally realistic in tone, marked by occasional bursts of surrealism and absurdity, such as Osaka imagining Chiyo's ponytails being "unscrewed" from her head and an episode featuring the characters' New Year's dreams.

== Production ==
The series title has no particular significance to the story. "Azumanga" is a portmanteau of the author's name "Azuma" and "manga", while "Daioh" comes from the magazine in which it was originally published, Dengeki Daioh. In the anime, "daioh" is mentioned during the next episode previews, used in context with the meaning "great king".

"Azumanga" is also used as a general term for Kiyohiko Azuma's other comics and illustrations. Two previous collections of Azuma's works, including official tie-in comics of Pioneer animations, were published as Azumanga and Azumanga 2 in 1998 and 2001, respectively. Azumanga Daioh was later republished in a reduced-size edition called Azumanga Recycle.

== Media ==
=== Manga ===
Azumanga Daioh was written and illustrated by Kiyohiko Azuma, largely in yonkoma (four-panel) format. The unnumbered chapters were serialized by MediaWorks in the monthly magazine Dengeki Daioh from February 1999 to May 2002. The series was collected in four tankōbon volumes. Each of the four volumes covers about a year in the characters' lives. A new edition in three volumes was released in Japan by Shogakukan to commemorate the manga's 10th anniversary, with volume one, covering the first year of high school, being published June 11, 2009. The reprint edition contains three additional 16-page chapters serialized in Monthly Shōnen Sunday starting in May 2009 under the title Azumanga Daioh: Supplementary Lessons (あずまんが大王·補習編, Azumanga Daiō Hoshūhen).

The series was licensed in English in North America and the United Kingdom by ADV Manga, which released all four volumes between 2003 and 2004. ADV later reprinted the series in an omnibus edition (ISBN 978-1-4139-0364-5) on November 7, 2007. In 2009, Yen Press acquired the North American and UK license of Azumanga Daioh, and released a new translation in December 2009 in an omnibus volume. In Europe, Azumanga Daioh is licensed in French by Kurokawa, in German by Tokyopop, in Spanish by Norma Editorial, in Finnish by Punainen jättiläinen and in Russian by Palm Press. In Asia, the series has been licensed in Korean by Daiwon C.I., in Thai by Negibose Comics, in Vietnam by TVM Comics, and in Chinese by Tong Li Publishing. It was also translated into Brazilian Portuguese by NewPOP Editora. It was the first yonkoma manga translated in France.

=== Anime ===
The anime television series, Azumanga Daioh: the Animation, was produced by J.C.Staff and aired from the week of April 8, 2002, until the week of September 30, 2002. It was broadcast on TV Tokyo, TV Aichi, TV Osaka, and AT-X in five-minute segments every weekday, then repeated as a 25-minute compilation that weekend, for a total of 130 five-minute segments collected in 26 episodes. For the compilation episodes, the respective opening and ending themes were "Soramimi Cake" (空耳ケーキ, Soramimi Kēki; Cake of Mishearing) and "Raspberry Heaven", both performed by Oranges & Lemons. The compilation episodes, which were the only versions to include the title and credits sequences, were released on 6 DVDs in 2003 and 9 Universal Media Discs between 2005 and 2006 by Starchild Records, and a DVD box set of all episodes was released on June 24, 2009; the five-minute segments can be distinguished by their individual titles.

Besides the anime television series, there have been two other animated adaptations: The Very Short Azumanga Daioh Movie, a six-minute trailer released in movie theaters to publicize the then-upcoming animated television series, and Azumanga Web Daioh, a shorter original net animation made available for paid streaming on chara-ani.com beginning from December 28, 2000, then offered as a paid download for a limited time. Azumanga Web Daioh was originally intended to gauge whether there was enough interest to create a web-released anime adaptation; because of overwhelming demand, the original plan for web-release was changed to a television release. It featured different voice actors, music, and staff from the series.

In the United States, the anime television series was released in six DVDs on September 9, 2005, and then later in a five DVD volume "Thinpak" set, both by ADV Films. The sixth DVD volume included The Very Short Azumanga Daioh Movie. In 2009, Nokia offered the first five episodes of Azumanga Daioh on its Ovi phone service. Madman Entertainment licensed the series for release in Australia and New Zealand. As of September 1, 2009, all of ADV's former catalog are transferred to AEsir Holdings, with distribution from Section23 Films. The series was later re-licensed in 2016 by Sentai Filmworks.

=== Soundtracks ===
Several soundtrack albums for the anime of Azumanga Daioh were released by Lantis, including two volumes of the Azumanga Daioh Original Soundtrack, collecting the show's score and themes; two tribute albums; and Vocal Collection, collecting character image songs. One single was released for the opening and closing theme of the anime, and eight singles of image songs were released for the main cast members.

- The opening and closing theme single Soramimi no Cake/Raspberry Heaven was released on April 22, 2002. The two volumes of the soundtrack were released on June 26, 2006, and October 23, 2002, The soundtrack albums were re-released as a two-disc set on June 24, 2009, in conjunction with the 10th anniversary release of the DVD box set. Azumanga Daioh Original Soundtrack Volume 1 was released in the United States by Geneon.
- Azumanga Daioh: Vocal Collection collects the character image songs performed by the voice actors in the personas of the characters they played, and the opening and the closing theme songs. It was released on December 25, 2002, in Japan, Eight image song singles were released as Azumanga Daioh Characters Songs Volumes 1 through 8, which focused in order on Chiyo, Sakaki, Osaka, Tomo, Kagura, Yomi, Sensei, and Kaorin. Volumes 1 and 2 were released May 22, 2002, Volume 3 on June 26, 2002, Volumes 4 and 5 on July 27, 2002, Volume 6 and 7 on September 4, 2002, and Volume 8 on September 25, 2002. Azumanga Daioh: Vocal Collection was released in the United States by Geneon on July 5, 2005.
- Two tribute albums, Tribute to Azumanga Daioh and Tribute to Live Azumanga Daioh, were released on October 2, 2002, and December 10, 2003.

=== Other media ===
Two art books for the anime were published under the titles Azumanga Daioh the Animation Visual Book 1 (あずまんが大王 THE ANIMATION ビジュアルブック(1)) (ISBN 4-8402-2203-7) and Azumanga Daioh the Animation Visual Book 2 (あずまんが大王 THE ANIMATION ビジュアルブック(2)) (ISBN 4-8402-2290-8) were published by MediaWorks on August 26, 2002, and December 10, 2002, respectively.

Three Azumanga Daioh video games were released. Azumanga Donjyara Daioh, a puzzle game similar to mahjong, was released by Bandai for the PlayStation on April 18, 2002. A crossover game with Puzzle Bobble, called Azumanga Daioh Puzzle Bobble, developed by Moss and published by Taito, was released on December 13, 2002, for the Sega NAOMI only in Japan. Azumanga Daioh Advance, a card-playing game, was released by King Records for the Game Boy Advance on April 25, 2003.

== Reception ==
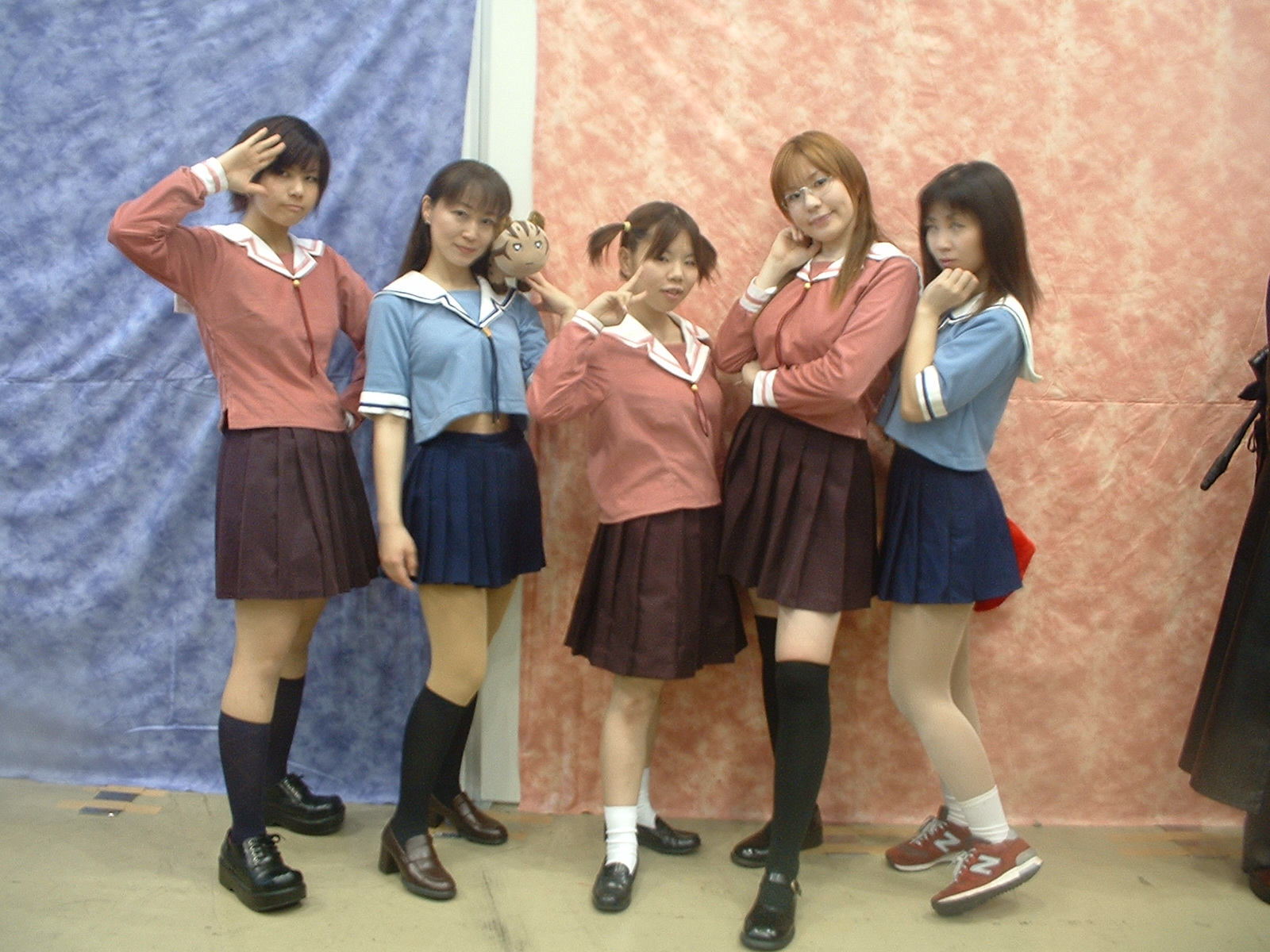
Cosplayers of some of the main characters in 2006

Both the manga and anime have been praised for their humor driven by eccentric characters, with Azuma acclaimed as a "master of the four-panel form" for both his art style and comic timing. In Japan, the Azumanga Daioh manga was named a jury recommended work of the sixth Japan Media Arts Festival in 2002. The manga was named as one of the top 25 manga at the 2006 Japan Media Arts Festival.

English reviewers have commented positively about Azumanga Daioh. In Manga: The Complete Guide, Jason Thompson refers to it as a "charming comedy" and a "quiet master of the four-panel form", praising the series comedic timing and use of running gags. He felt one of the series' best points was its "character-driven writing", but does warn that its moe nature and the jokes that revolve around the "vaguely pedophilic teacher" might disturb some newer readers of manga. He later said that Azumanga Daioh was an "almost totally innocent" kind of moe, centered around "peep[ing] at the chaste world of girls", in which "adorable girls do adorable things". The French manga dictionary Dicomanga noted that despite being a moe series targeted at otaku, it also appealed to female readers for celebrating "friendships between girls as well as [its] comedy". Marc Hairston describes Azumanga Daioh as being "slightly disjointed", with "frequently oblique" and "culturally biased" humour, and says it is both "lighter" and "more wry" than Maria-sama ga Miteru. He describes the characters of Azumanga Daioh as being "individuals with slightly offbeat personalities". Mark Thomas, writing for Mania.com, says that each character has "a defining personality trait that is ramped up to abnormal levels" and that each has a foil, which highlights these traits and prevents them from becoming too annoying or unbelievable as characters. Thomas said that the yonkoma format does not lend itself to "complex story arcs", and the story is presented as "quick snapshots of random moments in their daily routines", noting that the narrative is character-driven. Patrick King, writing for Anime Fringe, considered it to be "one of the funniest, most adorable manga series I've read". IGN noted the lack of background art, but said that the expressive faces of the characters made up for it.

Fred Patton of Animation World Magazine described the anime as "delightfully witty and even an educational window onto what Japanese high school life is really like". Chris Beveridge of Anime on DVD, stated that "There's a lot to laugh with here and a cast of characters that grow quickly on you as you start finding those you favor and those you don't." Andrew Shelton from Anime Meta explains that "The character of the girls is extremely well brought out. The superb observation, and ability to capture expression, makes the anime incredibly fun to watch in addition to meeting the story requirements. The action, and very rich comedy, are also wonderfully represented. There is just so much meaning, and charm, in even the most minor of expressions." The reviewers of THEM Anime Reviews and Anime News Network felt that fans who had already graduated high school would feel nostalgic at times while watching Azumanga Daioh. Lauren Bryant of Art Decko Magazine, noted that the series is "filled with silly gags and hijinks", having a "lighthearted humor" with "very minimalist" animation, and said that the show makes Kaori "overtly gay" as she has a crush on Sakaki. However, Bryant criticized Kimura for being "vaguely paedophilic", but called the series on the whole "very wholesome and hilarious".

The licensed manga had sales that reached top 100 lists on occasions and was included in the top 25 manga recommended by International Correspondence in Retailers Guide to Anime/Manga. The English dub for the show was well received, earning six ADR Awards from fans voting on AnimeonDVD.com and Dubreview.com. Four of the girls were included in Newtype's top 100 anime heroines of 2002: Osaka was awarded 7th, Chiyo 11th, Sakaki 21st, and Yomi 78th. Together, they made Azumanga Daioh the second most popular series of 2002 for female characters.
