= Kalafina discography =

- Studio albums: 5
- Extended plays: 1
- Live albums: 2
- Compilation albums: 3
- Singles: 22
- Music videos: 26
- DVDs & Blu-rays: 9

This is the discography of Japanese female group Kalafina.

== Albums ==
=== Studio albums ===
Title	Album details	Peak chart positions	Sales
Title	Album details	JPN	Sales
Seventh Heaven	Released: March 4, 2009; Label: SME Records; Formats: CD+DVD, CD, digital download, streaming	8	JPN: 38,000
Red Moon	Released: March 17, 2010; Label: SME Records; Formats: CD+DVD, CD, digital download, streaming	5	JPN: 28,000
After Eden	Released: September 21, 2011; Label: SME Records; Formats: CD+DVD, CD, digital download, streaming	3	JPN: 34,000
Consolation	Released: March 20, 2013; Label: SME Records; Formats: CD+DVD, CD+Blu-ray disc, CD, digital download, streaming	3	JPN: 33,000
Far on the Water	Released: November 16, 2016; Label: SME Records; Formats: CD+DVD, CD+Blu-ray disc, CD, LP, digital download, streaming	2	JPN: 47,000

=== Extended plays ===
Title	Album details	Peak chart positions	Sales
Title	Album details	JPN	Sales
Re/Oblivious	Released: April 23, 2008; Label: SME Records; Formats: CD, digital download	37	JPN: 10,000

=== Compilation albums ===
Title	Album details	Peak chart positions	Sales
Title	Album details	JPN	Sales
The Best "Red"	Released: July 16, 2014; Label: SME Records; Formats: CD+Blu-ray disc, CD, digital download, streaming	4	JPN: 47,000
The Best "Blue"	Released: July 16, 2014; Label: SME Records; Formats: CD+Blu-ray disc, CD, digital download, streaming	3	JPN: 59,000
Winter Acoustic "Kalafina with Strings"	Released: November 16, 2016; Label: SME Records; Formats: CD, digital download, streaming	15	JPN: 12,000
Kalafina All Time Best 2008-2018	Released: November 16, 2016; Label: Sacra Music; Formats: CD, digital download, streaming	6	JPN: 15,000

=== Live albums ===
Title	Album details	Peak chart positions	Sales
Title	Album details	JPN	Sales
Kalafina 5th Anniversary Live Selection 2009-2012	Released: January 23, 2013; Label: SME Records; Formats: CD+DVD+Blu-ray disc, CD, digital download, streaming	11	JPN: 12,000
Kalafina Live Tour 2014 at Tokyo International Forum Hall A	Released: January 20, 2016; Label: SME Records; Formats: CD, digital download	14	JPN: 8,000

== Singles ==
List of singles as lead artist
Title	Year	Peak chart positions		Sales	Certifications	Album
Title	Year	JPN	JPN Hot 100	Sales	Certifications	Album
"Oblivious"	2008	8	85	JPN: 38,000		Seventh Heaven
"Sprinter"	2008	10	85	JPN: 23,000		Seventh Heaven
"Aria"	2008	10	—	JPN: 23,000		Seventh Heaven
"Fairytale"	2008	9	79	JPN: 20,000		Seventh Heaven
"Lacrimosa"	2009	14	—	JPN: 17,000		Red Moon
"Storia"	2009	15	—	JPN: 7,000	RIAJ (dig.): Gold	Red Moon
"Progressive"	2009	14	—	JPN: 6,700		Red Moon
"Hikari no Senritsu"	2010	7	—	JPN: 20,000		Red Moon
"Kagayaku Sora no Shijima ni wa"	2010	14	44	JPN: 11,000		After Eden
"Magia"	2011	7	18	JPN: 48,000	RIAJ (dig.): Gold	After Eden
"To the Beginning"	2012	11	6	JPN: 52,000	RIAJ (dig.): Gold	Consolation
"Moonfesta"	2012	11	21	JPN: 10,000		Consolation
"Hikari Furu"	2012	4	3	JPN: 58,000		Consolation
"Alleluia"	2013	10	20	JPN: 19,000		The Best "Red"
"Kimi no Gin no Niwa"	2013	4	6	JPN: 61,000	RIAJ (dig.): Gold	The Best "Blue"
"Heavenly Blue"	2014	15	17	JPN: 18,000	RIAJ (dig.): Gold	Far on the Water
"Believe"	2014	10		JPN: 27,000		Far on the Water
"Ring Your Bell"	2015	8	7	JPN: 26,000		Far on the Water
"One Light"	2015	10	15	JPN: 17,000		Far on the Water
"Alcira no Hoshi" (with Shinji Tanimura)	2016	37	—			Non-album single
"Blaze"	2016	10	9	JPN: 14,000		Kalafina All Time Best 2008-2018
"Into the World"	2017	9	25	JPN: 13,000		Kalafina All Time Best 2008-2018
"Märchen"	2017	9	—	JPN: 13,000		Kalafina All Time Best 2008-2018
"Hyakka Ryōran"	2017	9	11	JPN: 21,000		Kalafina All Time Best 2008-2018
"—" denotes a recording that did not chart or was not released in that territory.

== DVD & Blu-ray Releases ==
Year	Title	Information
2010	Kalafina LIVE 2010 "Red Moon" at JCB HALL ~Kajiura Produce 3rd Anniversary LIVE TOUR~	Includes performance of Kajiura Produce 3rd Anniversary LIVE TOUR Kalafina LIVE 2010 "Red Moon" on June 12, 2010, and a documentary of Kalafina's visit to Hong Kong in March 2010 during their Asia Tour.
2011	Kalafina "After Eden" Special LIVE 2011 at TOKYO DOME CITY HALL	
2013	Kalafina Live Tour 2013 "Consolation" Special Final at TOKYO INTERNATIONAL FORUM HALL A	
2015	Kalafina LIVE THE BEST 2015 "Red Day" at Nippon Budokan	
2015	Kalafina LIVE THE BEST 2015 "Blue Day" at Nippon Budokan	
2016	Kalafina LIVE TOUR 2015 ~ 2016 "far on the water" Special FINAL at Tokyo International Forum Hall A	
2017	Kalafina Arena LIVE 2016 at Nippon Budokan	
2017	Kalafina "9+ONE" at TOKYO INTERNATIONAL FORUM HALL A	
2018	Kalafina 10th Anniversary LIVE 2018 at Nippon Budokan	

== Music videos ==
Year	Song	Director
2008	"sprinter"	Toshiyuki Suzuki
2008	"fairytale"	Toshiyuki Suzuki
2008	"oblivious"	
2009	"Seventh Heaven"	
2009	"Lacrimosa"	Toshiyuki Suzuki
2009	"storia"	Toshiyuki Suzuki
2009	"progressive"	Toshiyuki Suzuki
2010	"Hikari no Senritsu"	Toshiyuki Suzuki
2010	"Kagayaku Sora no Shijima ni wa"	Takuya Tada
2011	"Magia"	Takuya Tada
2011	"symphonia"	Takuya Tada
2012	"to the beginning"	
2012	"moonfesta"	
2012	"Hikari Furu"	Takuya Tada
2013	"Yume no Daichi"	Takuya Tada
2013	"Kimi no Gin no Niwa"	Takuya Tada
2014	"heavenly blue"	
2014	"believe"	Takuya Tada
2015	"ring your bell"	
2015	"One Light"	
2015	"far on the water"	
2016	"Alcira no Hoshi"	
2016	"Blaze"	
2017	"into the world"	
2017	"Μärchen"	
2017	"Hyakka Ryouran"	

== Other appearances ==
Release	Title	Album
2009	"Lacrimosa"	Kuroshitsuji Sound Complete Black Box
2010	"Kagayaku Sora no Shijima ni wa (TV size)"	Kuroshitsuji II Original Soundtrack
2010	"Hikari no Senritsu (TV size)"	Sora no Woto Original Soundtrack
2010	"I have a dream (Movie version)"	Eve no Jikan Original Soundtrack
2011	"storia"	Rekishi Hiwa Historia Original Soundtrack II
2011	"symphonia (TV version)"	Rekishi Hiwa Historia Original Soundtrack II
2013	"Magia"	Puella Magi Madoka Magica Music Collection
2014	"storia (TV version)"	Rekishi Hiwa Historia Original Soundtrack III
2014	"Yume no Daichi"	Rekishi Hiwa Historia Original Soundtrack III
2015	"believe"	Fate/stay night[Unlimited Blade Works]Blu-ray Disc Box II
2015	"ring your bell"	Fate/stay night[Unlimited Blade Works]Blu-ray Disc Box II
2026	"Arrietty's song"	Ghibli no utau 2
