= The Best "Red" =

The Best “Red”

Compilation album by Kalafina
- Released: 16 July 2014
- Recorded: 2008–2014
- Genre: J-pop, progressive rock, gothic metal, baroque pop
- Length: 71:08
- Label: SME Records (Sony Music Entertainment Japan)
- Producer: Yuki Kajiura

Kalafina chronology
Consolation (2013)	The Best “Red” (2014)	Far on the Water (2015)

Singles from THE BEST “Red”
- 1. "Alleluia" Released: 2 October 2013

THE BEST "Red" is the first best album released by Japanese girl group Kalafina. It was released at the same time as THE BEST "Blue". It was released in a limited CD+Blu-ray edition and a regular CD Only edition.

== Track listing ==
All tracks are written by Yuki Kajiura.

THE BEST "Red"
No.	Title	Length
1.	"prelude"	1:35
2.	"misterioso"	4:00
3.	"Hikari no Senritsu (光の旋律, Melody of Light)"	6:12
4.	"Lacrimosa"	4:13
5.	"ARIA"	6:13
6.	"Kagayaku Sora no Shijima ni wa (輝く空の静寂には, In the Silence of a Shining Sky)"	4:12
7.	"moonfesta"	4:27
8.	"Hikari Furu (ひかりふる, Falling Lights)"	4:53
9.	"oblivious"	4:22
10.	"Ongaku (音楽, Music)"	5:38
11.	"consolation"	5:10
12.	"Mune no Yukue (胸の行方, Where the Heart Is)"	6:17
13.	"Yume no Daichi (夢の大地, Land of Dreams)"	4:01
14.	"Eden"	5:40
15.	"Alleluia (アレルヤ, Hallelujah)"	5:06
Total length:		71:08

Limited Edition Bonus Blu-ray: Live Video '5th Anniversary' in January 2013
No.	Title	Length
1.	"oblivious"
2.	"ARIA"
3.	"Manten (満天, Full Sky)"
4.	"to the beginning"
5.	"Hikari Furu (ひかりふる, Falling Lights)"
6.	"Mirai (未来, Future)"
Total length:		32:14

== Charts ==
Chart	Peak position
Oricon Weekly Albums	4
