= Believe (Kalafina song) =

Single by Kalafina

from the album Far on the Water
- Released: November 19, 2014
- Genre: Progressive rock, gothic metal, baroque pop
- Length: 4:51
- Label: SME Records
- Songwriters: Keiko Kubota; Yuki Kajiura; Wakana Ootaki; Hikaru Masai
- Producer: Yuki Kajiura

Kalafina singles chronology
| "heavenly blue" (2014) | "Believe" (2014) | "ring your bell" (2015) |

Music video
- "Believe" on YouTube

"Believe" (stylized in Japanese as "believe") is a song by the Japanese musical group Kalafina. It was released on November 19, 2014, through SME Records as a stand-alone single to promote the Japanese visual novel Fate/stay night (2004). "Believe" was the group's second single from their fifth studio album Far on the Water (2015). The song was written by Yuki Kajiura, who also composed and produced the single which she has done for the group since their debut.

"Believe" had received positive reviews from contemporary Japanese music critics who praised the sound and likened the production values of the song. Commercially the song charted moderately but managed to achieve wide charting positions in both Oricon and Billboard, equally peaking at number ten.

== Background and release ==
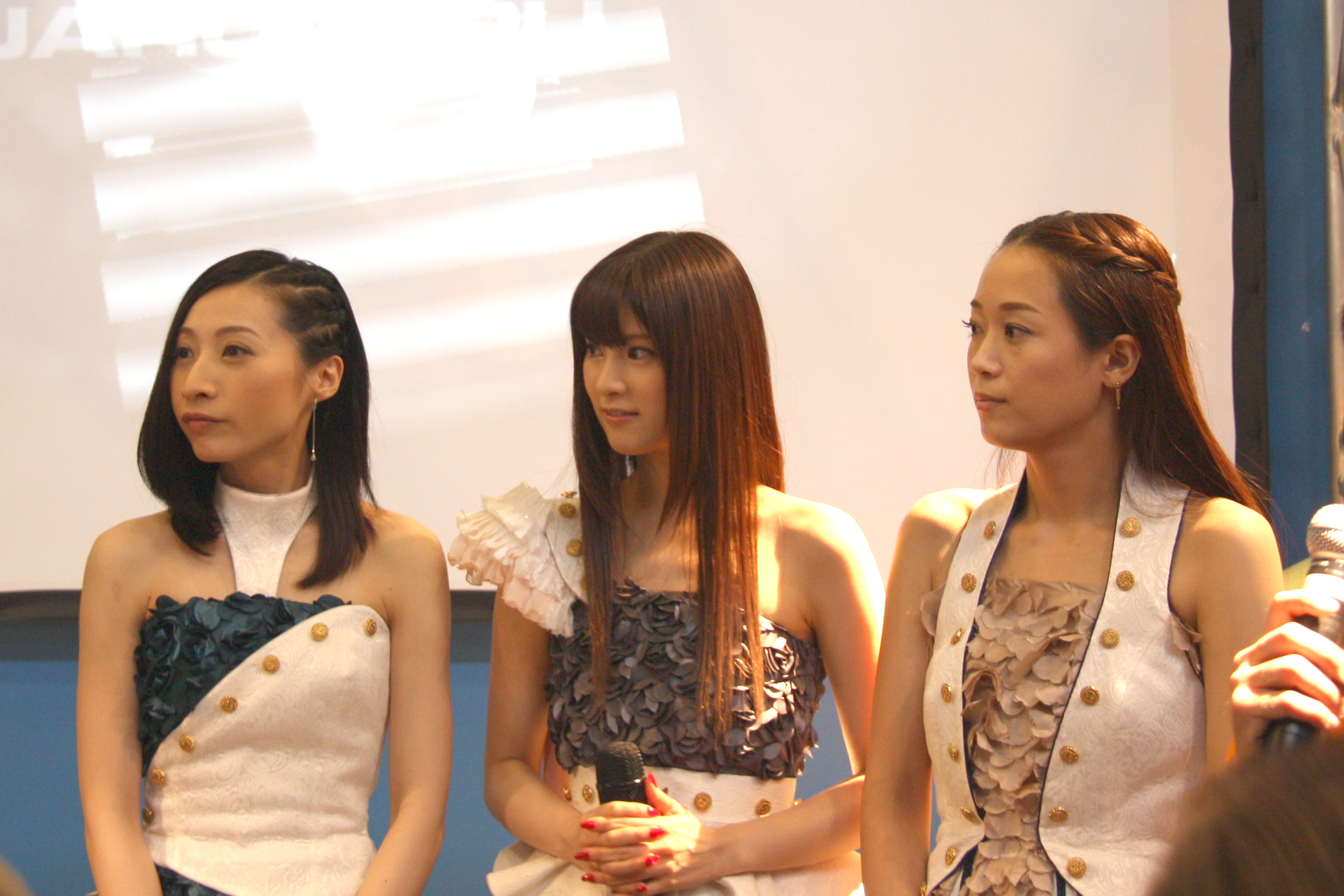
Kalafina at Japan Expo in 2014

In March 2013, Kalafina had released their fourth studio album Consolation. It was fully produced, composed and written by Japanese music composer and producer Yuki Kajiura who also formed the band in order to promote music within the anime and television scene in Japan. The album had charted at number three on the Oricon Albums Chart, making it the group's highest equal charting album to date on Oricon which is second to their previous studio album After Eden (2011). The album lasted fifteen weeks on the chart, making it their longest charting album since their debut effort. Since the 2013 release, the group have promoted several singles for several anime series and television series in Japan. The group released two sequel albums; a red version and blue version off The Best, charting at number four and three respectively. To promote this, they released three singles that were in support of anime series and managed to chart moderately in Japan.

"Believe" is the group's first single from their upcoming fifth studio album. The song was written by Kajiura along with composing and producing the single which she has done for the group since their debut. The song was used in promotion for the Japanese anime visual novel Fate/stay night and was used as the ending credits for the Unlimited Blade Works series that aired in Japan and North America in late 2014. "Believe" was released in four formats; a stand-alone CD single, a CD+DVD edition, a CD+Blu-ray released and an anime-packaging CD+DVD edition.

== Composition ==
"Believe" was written by Kajiura along with composing and producing the single which she has done for the group since their debut. "Believe" is 4 minutes and 51 seconds. Member Wakana Ōtaki had commented that the song; "The music and the sound is very dashing [...] and is leisurely very melodious and bright." She stated that based on her opinion, "Believe" and the other tracks on the physical edition are inspired by ballad and soft rock music.

Lyrically the song is about believing in one and another, both romantically and friendship-wise and is based on the themes off trust and hope. Although commenting that the lyrics were straightforward, band member Keiko Kubota said "I want people to feel and believe [...]". While Hikaru Masai said that the song demonstrates the difference between reality and saying that it separated the observation of dreams and reality.

== Chart performance ==
"Believe" achieved success in two Japanese markets; Oricon and Billboard Japan. The song debuted at number ten on the Oricon Singles Chart of the weekend of December 1, 2014. The song fell from this position to number twenty three the next week, becoming the largest fall through that weekend. In the song's third week, the song fell off the top fifty completely and only lasted two weeks inside the top fifty and in total, the song charted for ten weeks, making it one of the group's lowest longevity singles but their first top ten single since "Kimi no Gin no Niwa". Based on the Oricon ranking, "Believe" is the group's sixth best selling single as of March 2015.

"Believe" achieved higher success on several Japanese Billboard charts. The song also debuted at number ten on the Japan Hot 100. The song dropped to number thirty-four in its next charting week and fell to number seventy-seven in its third week course, its last week on the chart. The song had debuted at number three on the Billboard Anime Songs chart.

== Track listing ==
CD single
| No. | Title | Length |
|---|---|---|
| 1. | "Believe" | 4:51 |
| 2. | "In Every Nothing" | 4:36 |
| 3. | "Lapis" | 3:48 |
| 4. | "Believe (Instrumental)" | 4:51 |

== Charts ==
| Chart (2014) | Peak position |
|---|---|
| Daily Chart (Oricon) | 7 |
| Weekly Chart (Oricon) | 10 |
| hart (Oricon) | 18 |
| Japan Hot 100 (Billboard) | 10 |
| Japan Anime Songs (Billboard) | 5 |
