= The Best "Blue" =

THE BEST “Blue”

Compilation album by Kalafina
- Released: 16 July 2014
- Recorded: 2008–2014
- Genre: J-pop, progressive rock, gothic metal, baroque pop
- Length: 76:36
- Label: SME (Sony Music Entertainment Japan)
- Producer: Yuki Kajiura

Kalafina chronology
Consolation (2013)	THE BEST “Blue” (2014)	far on the water (2015)

Singles from THE BEST “Blue”
- 1. "Kimi no Gin no Niwa" Released: 6 November 2013; 2. "heavenly blue" Released: 6 August 2014

THE BEST "Blue" is the first best of album released by Japanese girl group Kalafina. It was released at the same time as another Kalafina's compilation album THE BEST "Red". It was released in a limited CD+Blu-ray edition and a regular CD Only edition.

== Track listing ==
All tracks are written by Yuki Kajiura.

THE BEST “Blue”
No.	Title	Length
1.	"storia"	3:37
2.	"Kimi no Gin no Niwa (君の銀の庭, Your Silver Garden)"	5:06
3.	"red moon"	6:39
4.	"Magia"	5:12
5.	"seventh heaven"	6:13
6.	"signal"	4:59
7.	"Natsu no Ringo (夏の林檎, Summer Apple)"	4:03
8.	"sprinter"	5:04
9.	"I have a dream"	5:57
10.	"Mirai (未来, Future)"	4:32
11.	"Manten (満天, Sea's Sky)"	5:14
12.	"snow falling"	4:40
13.	"to the beginning"	4:16
14.	"symphonia"	5:44
15.	"heavenly blue"	5:20
Total length:		76:36

Limited Edition Bonus Blu-ray: Live Video 'Risuani! LIVE-4' in January 2014
No.	Title	Length
1.	"Misterioso"
2.	"Kimi no Gin no Niwa (君の銀の庭, Your Silver Garden)"
3.	"seventh heaven"
4.	"sprinter"
5.	"Ongaku (音楽, Music)"
6.	"Alleluia (アレルヤ, Hallelujah)"
Total length:		33:53

== Charts ==
Chart	Peak position
Oricon Weekly Albums	3
