= Re/Oblivious =

Re/oblivious

EP by Kalafina
- Released: April 23, 2008
- Recorded: 2008
- Genre: J-Pop
- Label: Sony Music Japan
- Producer: Yuki Kajiura

Kalafina chronology
Re/oblivious (2008)	Seventh Heaven (2009)

Re/oblivious is a remix mini-album by Kalafina, featuring the two original members Wakana and Keiko.

== Track listing ==
Catalog Number: SECL-639

1. oblivious ~Fukan Fukei mix (oblivious ～俯瞰風景 mix)
2. interlude 01
3. Kimi ga Hikari ni Kaete Iku ~acoustic ver. (君が光に変えて行く ～acoustic ver., You Turn It Into Light ~acoustic ver.)
4. interlude 02
5. Kizuato ~piano2 mix (傷跡 ～piano² mix, Scar ~piano2 mix)
6. finale

== Charts ==
Chart	Peak position	Sales
Oricon Weekly albums	37	10,076
