= Moonfesta =

"moonfesta"

Single by Kalafina

from the album Consolation
- Released: July 18, 2012
- Genre: J-Pop
- Length: 4:28
- Label: SME Records
- Songwriter(s): Yuki Kajiura

Kalafina singles chronology
"to the beginning" (2012)	"moonfesta" (2012)	"Hikari Furu" (2012)

"Moonfesta" (stylized in Japanese as "moonfesta～ムーンフェスタ～") is a song recorded by Japanese trio Kalafina. The title track was used as theme song for the TV show Minna no Uta. It was the group's second single from their fourth studio album Consolation. The song was written by Yuki Kajiura, who also composed and produced the single, which she has done for the group since their debut. It was released in three versions: a limited CD+DVD edition (Type-A), a limited CD+Blu-ray edition (Type-B), and a regular CD only edition.

== Track list ==
- Digital download single/CD single
1. "moonfesta" – 4:28
2. "Yane no Mukou ni (屋根の向こうに, On the Other Side of the Roof)" – 4:29
3. "moonfesta" (instrumental) – 4:27
- Limited edition CD track list
1. "moonfesta" – 4:28
2. "Yane no Mukou ni (屋根の向こうに, On the Other Side of the Roof)" – 4:29
3. "moonfesta" (Minna no Uta version) – 2:24
4. "moonfesta" (Minna no Uta version) (instrumental) – 4:27
- Limited edition Type-A bonus DVD
1. "moonfesta" (music video)
- Limited edition Type-B bonus DVD
1. "moonfesta" (music video)
2. "moonfesta" (Minna no Uta version)

== Personnel ==
- Yuki Kajiura – arrangement
- Furukawa Masayoshi – acoustic guitar
- Nozaki Masuke – drums
- Takahashi "Jr" Tomoharu – bass
- Misawa Mataro – percussion
- Konno Hitoshi – strings
