= Zaregoto =

Japanese light novel series

- First novel volume cover, featuring Tomo Kunagisa

戯言
- Genre: Crime; Mystery
- Light novel
- Written by: Nisio Isin
- Illustrated by: Take
- Published by: Kodansha
- English publisher: NA: Del Rey Manga (former); Vertical
- Imprint: Kodansha Novels; Kodansha Bunko
- Original run: February 5, 2002 – February 8, 2023
- Volumes: 10
- Light novel

Ningen
- Written by: Nisio Isin
- Illustrated by: Take
- Published by: Kodansha
- Imprint: Kodansha Novels; Kodansha Bunko
- Original run: February 5, 2004 – March 25, 2010
- Volumes: 7
- Manga

Zerozaki Soushiki no Ningen Shiken
- Written by: Nisio Isin
- Illustrated by: Iruka Shiomiya
- Published by: Kodansha
- Imprint: Afternoon KC
- Magazine: Monthly Afternoon
- Original run: September 24, 2011 – August 24, 2013
- Volumes: 5
- Light novel

Saikyō
- Written by: Nisio Isin
- Illustrated by: Take
- Published by: Kodansha
- Imprint: Kodansha Novels
- Magazine: Mephisto
- Original run: April 4, 2014 – November 11, 2020
- Volumes: 5
- Manga

Zerozaki Kishishiki no Ningen Knock
- Written by: Nisio Isin
- Illustrated by: Chomoran
- Published by: Kodansha
- Imprint: Afternoon KC
- Magazine: Monthly Afternoon
- Original run: August 25, 2014 – September 24, 2016
- Volumes: 4
- Original video animation

The Beheading Cycle: The Blue Savant and the Nonsense Bearer
- Directed by: Akiyuki Shinbo; Yuki Yase
- Produced by: Takuya Matsushita (Kodansha); Akiko Yodo (Aniplex); Yasuhiro Okada (Shaft)
- Written by: Composition: Akiyuki Shinbo; Shaft (Note: Credited under the collective pen name Fuyashi Tō.); Screenplay: Yukito Kizawa
- Music by: Yuki Kajiura
- Studio: Shaft
- Released: October 26, 2016 – September 27, 2017
- Runtime: 25–43 minutes (each)
- Episodes: 8
- icon

Zaregoto (Japanese: 戯言; lit. 'Nonsense') is a Japanese light novel series written by Nisio Isin and illustrated by Take. The series was published in Japan between February 2002 and November 2005 by Kodansha Books in nine volumes. Celebrating the twentieth anniversary of Nisio's debut in 2022, the tenth volume of the series was released on February 8, 2023. The series was followed by a seven-volume spin-off series also published by Kodansha Books, the Ningen (人間; 'Human') series, focusing on the Zerozaki clan. A second spin-off series focused on Jun Aikawa titled Saikyō (最強; 'Strongest') series was serialized in the Mephisto magazine, and was collected by Kodansha in five volumes. The first two volumes of Zaregoto were initially released in North America by Del Rey Manga, but have since been republished by Vertical, which also released the third volume. Two manga series adapting the first two volumes in the Ningen series were serialized in Kodansha's seinen manga magazine Monthly Afternoon between September 2011 and September 2016. An eight-episode original video animation series adaptation of the first volume by Shaft was released between October 2016 and September 2017.

== Plot ==
The story revolves around a narrator, whose name is never mentioned, and the mysteries he encounters. After the second book, the series starts including more and more fighting and action. The narrator tends to try, in vain, to stay out of the story, but instead of being the bystander he wants to be, he always gets dragged into the center of everything. Even though it seems the narrator does a lot in the story, he always finds out at the end that whatever he accomplished was meaningless.

== Setting ==
According to Tomo's explanation, the world is divided into four separate kinds of territories:

- The "Outer" World (The world of peace and war) is the normal side of the world. The holder of the highest mediocrity.
- The "Economical" World (The Four Gods and One Mirror, <RULE>) is the holder of the strongest economical powers of the world. The closest to the "Outer" World.
- The "Political" World (The Kunagisa Organization) is the holder of the strongest ruling powers of the world.
- The "Violence" World (The Murdering Name, The Cursing Name) is the holder of all unusual, heterodoxy, special powers of the world. This world is a world with no order, only lawless massacre.

== Characters ==
=== The "Outer" World ===
==== "I"'s relationships ====
"I" (ぼく)
Voiced by: Yūki Kaji
"Nonsense Bearer" (戯言遣い, Zaregoto Tsukai). The narrator of the Zaregoto series, people call him by all sorts of nicknames beginning with the phonetic pronunciation of his family name Ii (井伊) such as "Ii-chan" (いーちゃん), "Ikkun" (いっくん), "Ii-tan" (いいたん). Birthday is in March, birthplace Kobe. His real name was never revealed, but in Hanging High School he played a name-guessing quiz with Shiogi Hagihara (later mentioned), but the answer was not revealed either.
After graduating eighth grade, he entered the ER3 system (a type of genius raising school) and went to Houston, Texas for five years; with the death of his good friend, Magokoro Omokage, he withdrew from the system. Now, he is a resident of the Antique Apartment, second floor, and also a student in the Rokumeikan Private University. He consistently downplays his own abilities and extremely apathetic. He inevitably ends up solving the mysteries he encounters but at the end of each mystery realizes his activities were meaningless. Many characters he encounters including himself are morally grey and representing extreme philosophical ideals.
Jun Aikawa (哀川 潤, Aikawa Jun)
Voiced by: Yūko Kaida
"Humanity's Strongest". Known famously throughout the world as humanity's strongest contractor. About 24 years old. Whatever legal or illegal, if paid she will get it done. A master of disguising, sound imitating, lock picking (even ones with fingerprint scanners), and mind reading. Presented with the names "the Most Powerful Private Contractor in the World", "the World's Greatest Entrepreneur", "Overkilled Red", "Desert Eagle", "One Against A Thousand", "The Storm Before The Storm".
In the first book, Jun was invited to help solve the murder on the island, but she does not appear until the novel's epilogue. At the beginning of the book, Ii-chan presumes that Aikawa is a man.
Harukana Ii (井伊 遥奈, Ii Harukana)
"I"'s little sister. When she was young, she was kidnapped by the Kunagisa organization. When "I" and Tomo met, he still didn't know of his little sister's existence, even though she was living almost right beside him. She is one of the few people who knows of "I"'s true name. She died in an airplane accident.

==== The Residents of the Antique Apartment ====
The apartment which "I" lives in. The real name of this place is unknown, "I" is the only one calling it The Antique Apartment. Existed before the Meiji period. Made mainly of wood, three stories, four-mat room with horrible sound insulation, bare light bulb, shared toilet, no bath; the rent is 10,000 yen per month, though.

Miiko Asano (浅野 みいこ, Asano Miiko)
"I"'s neighbor. 22 years old. A freeter, and also a master of kendo and kenjutsu. Kicked out of her previous apartment, she was taken in by Nanami Nanananami after found wandering in the streets. Always keeps her hair in a ponytail, usually wears a jinbei, with kanji representing her emotions at the moment, over casual clothing at home. Miiko hardly expresses her feeling through facial expression, but surprisingly, she has a rough temper when fighting. Once an information is received by her, it will be hard to make any changes to it afterwards. Likes sweet things, sake, and collecting antiques. Owns a Fiat 500, which is often borrowed by "I". Can never stop getting into trouble with the guests at a new work place, but still finds a job teaching at a kendo school momentarily.
Miiko is really concerned about "I"'s personality. "I" confessed to Miiko, but she reserved it saying she'll consider about it if "I" becomes a better man. Once had four relationships going at the same time, and three were girls, because she can't resist wanting to help the weak do everything for them.

==== "I"'s Classmates ====
In the second book, "I" attends Rokumeikan Private University. It is located in Kinugasa, in Kita Ward of Kyoto.

Mikoko Aoii (葵井 巫女子, Aoii Mikoko)
Born on April 20. According to "I"'s assumption, Mikoko is about 155cm and 50kg, a fairly normal girl. Usually has a high temper, and will hit anything nearby randomly. Owns a vespa (vintage model) and calls it "scoot", which made "I" very angry because he thinks it's disrespecting for the vespa. Likes to use exaggerating metaphors. Will take off clothes when drunk. Have feelings for "I". Tomoe Emoto's first friend, and best friends with Muimi Atemiya.
Tomoe Emoto (江本 智恵, Emoto Tomoe)
Born on May 14, 20 years old. A petite girl with twin tails, but has an aura of an adult. Likes shiny things. Lives alone. Tomoe stayed in the hospital for a long time during middle school, so she is actually held back for a year. She became friends with Mikoko in high school, because having an inferiority complex made her see Mikoko as an ideal being. Will become a kissing maniac when drunk. One of the few girls "I" is interested in. The witness of the beginning of the Kyoto serial killing.
Muimi Atemiya (貴宮 むいみ, Atemiya Muimi)
A yankī (delinquent). Brown hair. Has a little sister named Muri (Muimi means no meaning, Muri means unreasonable). Been smoking since elementary, but she doesn't smoke around non-smokers. She went to the same elementary school as Mikoko, and became friends with her because she saved Muimi from the depths of delinquency.
Akiharu Usami (宇佐美 秋春, Usami Akiharu)
Went to the same high school as Mikoko. Brown hair. A very normal human being, "I" can never remember what he looks like. Has a frivolous personality. After the second book ends, "I" completely forgets about his existence.

==== The Police ====
Sasaki Sasa (佐々 砂咲, Sasa Sasaki)
A police officer, teamed up with Ikaruga. Has a business like relationship with Jun Aikawa. Kyoto Prefectural Investigation group, First Division (murder cases) chief. Straight black hair with a cool and calm mind.
Kazuhito Ikaruga (斑鳩 数一, Ikaruga Kazuhito)
A police officer, teamed up with Sasa. Kyoto Prefectural Investigation group, First Division member. Wears a sun glasses, black hair combed all back, tall. A normal person.

=== The "Violence" World ===
The Killing Names consists of seven families, "Niounomiya (匂宮)", "Yamiguchi (闇口)", "Zerozaki (零崎)", "Susukino (薄野)", "Hakamori (墓森)", "Tenbuki (天吹)", "Ishinagi (石凪)". The sequence starts with the strongest. These families possess incredibly ridiculous killing abilities.
The Cursing Names consists of six families, "Tokinomiya (時宮)", "Tsumiguchi (罪口)", "Kino (奇野)", "Nukumori (拭森)", "Shibugi (死吹)", "Toganagi (咎凪)". The sequence starts with the strongest. These families refuse any physical battle, but the deaths caused by them are no less than The Killing Names. They attack their enemies through abnormal ways such as hypnotism, poison, and other ways; to defeat their enemies, they will not hesitate to deceive their allies as well. Every family has an opposing side in the different Names, for example: Niounomiya's opposing family is Tokinomiya (the second kanji in their names are the same). The only exception is the Zerozaki family.

==== Niounomiya ====
Known as the "Niounomiya Circus". Ranked first in the Killing Names. A family that kills under contract. Due to their special techniques when killing, people refer to them as "The Killing Magic Organization, Niounomiya Circus". There are a total of fifty-three branch families, including the Sawarabi family and the Miotsukushi family under the Niounomiya family. The opposing family in The Cursing Names is the Tokinomiya family.

Rizumu Niounomiya (匂宮 理澄, Rizumu Niounomiya)
Carnival. The little sister of the Niounomiya siblings and Izumu's counterpart. She is a detective dressed in a black mantle and a straitjacket. Currently 16 years old (her body is 22 years old). She does the investigating for the Niounomiya siblings. All of Izumu's weaknesses are harbored by her. A former member of the Thirteen Stairs.
Izumu Niounomiya (匂宮 出夢, Izumu Niounomiya)
Man Eater. The big brother of the Niounomiya siblings and Rizumu's counterpart. While Izumu and Rizumu have identical female bodies, Izumu's consciousness is male. Currently 18 years old (his body is 22 years old). He does the killing for the Niounomiya siblings.

==== Zerozaki ====
Known as the "Zerozaki Bandits". Rank third in The Killing Names. A group of unreasonable serial killers gathered not by blood relations, but by the thirst for blood. Contains twenty to twenty-five members. The only family without an opposing family in The Cursing Names.

Hitoshiki Zerozaki (零崎 人識, Zerozaki Hitoshiki)
The Human Failure. A child born through incestuous action (no blood relations, meaning two Zerozakis gave birth to him), a Zerozaki in the Zerozaki. The serial killer of the Kyoto serial killing. "I" was supposed to become one of his victims when he encounter him on Friday 13th under the bridge. Has a tattoo on the right side of his face, dyed hair, three earrings on the right ear and one cellphone strap on the left ear. He is about 150cm tall. Zerozaki is the mirror self of "I", hence the other way around, too. Always wears a vest full of knives.

=== The "Politics" World ===
The "Politics" world is controlled by the Kunagisa Organization, one of the few Zaibatsu that still exists in Japan. Seven organizations that hold control of the world is under Kunagisa, it consists of "Ichigai (壱外)", "Nishiori (壱弐栞)", "Sanzaka (参榊)", "Shikabane (肆屍)", "Gotoride (伍砦)", "Rokukase (陸枷)", and lastly "Hachikiri (捌限)". All of their name starts with a number, with Seven (柒) not included in the list.

Tomo Kunagisa (玖渚 友, Kunagisa Tomo)
Voiced by: Aoi Yūki
"The Blue Savant". Due to the recessive genes, she has an unusual appearance consisting blue eyes and blue hair, but is still a beauty. Diagnosed with savant syndrome. 19 years old.
Tomo is Ii-chan's closest friend. She is a genius in the field of computer engineering with a very eccentric personality. While Ii-chan was in Houston, she led a group of notorious computer hackers consisting of nine people including herself.
Nao Kunagisa (玖渚 直, Kunagisa Nao)
Tomo's big brother. He became the leader of the Kunagisa Organization during the latter part of the story (was formerly the secretary of his father). He has a well-rounded personality that appeals to people around him, which is completely different from his little sister. He has a sister complex.
Douji Kasumioka (霞丘 道児, Kasumioka Douji)
Nao Kunagisa's close friend. His whereabouts are unknown. He is the one who first called I the Nonsense Bearer. He is also the one who gave Tomo the nickname Blue Savant.

=== The "Economical" World ===
The "Economical" world consists of five big Zaibatsu, "Akagami (赤神)", "Iigami (謂神)", "Ujigami (氏神)", "Ekagami (絵鏡)", and "Origami (檻神)". Together, they are called the "Four Gods and One Mirror (四神一鏡)".

==== Four Gods and One Mirror's relationships ====
Iria Akagami (赤神 イリア, Akagami Iria)
Voiced by: Mariya Ise
A true princess of the Akagami plutocrat, but was exiled to Wet Crow's Feather Island due to D.L.L.R Syndrome (a sickness that makes people want to kill). The little sister of the twins. Now, she is the owner of the island and has an inexhaustible amount of time and money.
Has an unshakable trust towards Jun. 21 years old.
Rei Handa (班田 玲, Handa Rei)
Voiced by: Houko Kuwashima
Rei is the head maid on Wet Crow's Feather Island.
Akari Chiga (千賀 あかり, Chiga Akari)
Voiced by: Natsuko Kuwatani
The eldest of the triplets. A maid on Wet Crow's Island. Has an upheaval personality, but very smart. 27 years old.
Hikari Chiga (千賀 ひかり, Chiga Hikari)
Voiced by: Ryōko Shintani
The second of the triplets. A maid on Wet Crow's Island. Likes to haggle, has a bit of mysophobia. 27 years old.
Teruko Chiga (千賀 てる子, Chiga Teruko)
Voiced by: Yūko Gotō
The third of the triplets. A maid on Wet Crow's Island. Rarely talks, but if she opens her mouth, only lies will come out. Iria's bodyguard, has superior fighting skills (quote Hikari, "Invincible in short range"). 27 years old. Once defeated the notorious Kishishiki Zerozaki wearing an iron mask, so was known as the "Masked Maid". The only triplet who wears glasses.

=== Guests on Wet Crow's island ===
Wet Crow's Island is the property of the Akagami Plutocrats. Its purpose is to keep the exiled heiress away from the rest of the world. In Russian, it means "The End of Despair". Now, it is a place for geniuses to gather under the invitation of Iria.

Akane Sonoyama (園山 赤音, Sonoyama Akane)
Voiced by: Yū Shimamura
Genius scholar. One of the Seven Fools in the ER3 system, and the first Japanese to enter in her twenties. 30 years old. Raised out of Japan, so she is bad at yojijukugo, but very proud of her math and English abilities. Black straight hair, tall for a woman with a slender body. Went to a normal public high school. Severed her ties with her family. Champion of a karate tournament.
Kanami Ibuki (伊吹 かなみ, Ibuki Kanami)
Voiced by: Ayako Kawasumi
Blue-eyed, blond genius painter. The ultimate individualist. Was blind several years ago, now, her body is weak and handicapped, uses a wheel chair. She doesn't have a fixed style of painting. 29 years old. She always has an air of mystery around her, likes to keep a clean and neat appearance corresponding her huge pride. Her catchphrase is, "Don't you know?" It is revealed at the end of the first book that she and Akane had swapped bodies and she killed her later.
Shinya Sakaki (逆木 深夜, Sakaki Shinya)
Voiced by: Kenji Hamada
One of the two none geniuses invited (Shinya and "I"). The caretaker and former teacher of Kanami. 32 years old.
Maki Himena (姫菜 真姫, Himena Maki)
Voiced by: Aya Endō
Real name is Shinari Himena (姫菜 詩鳴, Himena Shinari). A genius fortune-teller, has a cynical personality. 29 years old. An ESPer, has the ability to see the past, see the future, use telepathy, see through, hear everything. She described her ability as watching large amounts of TV about other people without her on will, but she can only see two more years in her own future. Blond ponytail. Her catch phrase is, "I know the past, the future, people, and the world. I am an ESPer who knows everything."
She constantly picks on Ii-chan due to his personality.
Yayoi Sashirono (佐代野 弥生, Sashirono Yayoi)
Voiced by: Haruna Ikezawa
The genius chef of Wet Crow's Island. Can create the ultimate delicacy for the diners preference. Short hair with a straightforward personality. 30 years old. Has absolute pitch and absolute taste. Can identify up to twenty thousand different kinds of tastes and twenty different levels of pitches.
The most frightened after the murdering started, which is to say the most normal one since nobody except her was influenced by the dangerous atmosphere.

== Production ==
The Kubikiri Cycle went through a number of drafts; Tomo Kunagisa was originally intended to be the series' protagonist, but during the rewriting process, Nisio Isin realized that Ii-chan had become more important. After finally completing the novel, Nisio proceeded to write Strangulation Romanticist in three days. With Suspension High School, Nisio began consciously moving the series away from traditional mystery novel structure.

== Media ==
=== Novels ===
==== Zaregoto series ====
No.	Title	Original release date	English release date
1	Decapitation - Kubikiri Cycle: The Blue Savant and the Nonsense User; Kubikiri Saikuru: Aoiro Savan to Zaregoto Tsukai (クビキリサイクル 青色サヴァンと戯言遣い)	February 5, 2002; April 15, 2008; 978-4-06-182233-7	July 22, 2008; January 24, 2017; 978-0-345-50427-2; 978-1-945054-21-1
1. "Third Day (1) - Savant Ultramarine"; 2. "Third Day (2) - Set and Arithmetic"; 3. "Fourth Day (1) - One Decapitation"; 4. "Fourth Day (2) - The Tragedy of 0.14"; 5. "Fifth Day (1) - Two Decapitation"; 6. "Fifth Day (2) - Lie"; 7. "Fifth Day (3) - A Crow's Wet Feathers"; 8. "One Week Later - Divergence"; 9. "Epilogue - A Flaming Fairy Tale"
Ii-chan and his friend, the computer genius Tomo Kunagisa, are invited to Wet Crow's Feather Island in the sea of Japan. The island is owned by Iria Akagami, a wealthy disinherited heiress who has been living in exile on the island with her maids for the last five years. For entertainment, she regularly invites geniuses like Kunagisa to stay on the island. When one of the guests is found dead - decapitated - Iria decides to ask Jun Aikawa to solve the murder. But it will take several days before Jun will arrive, and Ii-chan decides to investigate the mystery while they wait.
2	Strangulation - Kubishime Romanticist: No Longer Human - Hitoshiki Zerozaki; Kubishime Romanchisuto: Ningen Shikkaku, Zerozaki Hitoshiki (クビシメロマンチスト 人間失格・零崎人識)	May 8, 2002; June 13, 2008; 978-4-06-182250-4	June 22, 2010; April 24, 2018; 978-0-345-50578-1; 978-1-945054-83-9
1. "Chapter 1 - Spotty-Cracked Mirror (Purple Mirror)"; 2. "Chapter 2 - Banquet on a Night Out (Yuya's Ties)"; 3. "Chapter 3 - Age of the Clairvoyant Man (Serial Killer)"; 4. "Chapter 4 - Red Violence (Stress through Transgressions)"; 5. "Chapter 5 - Callous (Black and White)"; 6. "Chapter 6 - Abnormal Ending (That Wraps It Up)"; 7. "Chapter 7 - Sink and Die (Cynicism)"; 8. "Chapter 8 - Trial (Mentality)"; 9. "Final Chapter - A World That Can't End"
Two weeks after the kubikiri incident, while eating lunch in the university cafeteria, he meets a girl named Mikoko Aoii, a friend he doesn't remember. She later invited him to her friend's birthday party for tomorrow, and with nothing better to do, he agrees. While buying birthday presents for tomorrow, he encounters the infamous serial killer of Kyoto, Hitoshiki Zerozaki. The next day, Ii-chan and Mikoko arrives at her friend's apartment and with three other people including the host, they started the party. However, the morning after, the host is found strangled to death.
3	Suspension - Kubitsuri High School - The Nonsense User's Disciple; Kubitsuri Hai Sukūru: Zaregoto Tsukai no Deshi (クビツリハイスクール 戯言遣いの弟子)	August 5, 2002; August 12, 2008; 978-4-06-182267-2	September 17, 2019; 978-1-947194-89-2
1. "Act One - Play It As It Lies"; 2. "Act Two - Shiogi's Iron Cordon"; 3. "Act Three - Hang 'Em High"; 4. "Act Four - The Dark Knife Rises"; 5. "Act Five - Backstab Rewind"; 6. "Act Six - End of the Line"; 7. "A Subjugation in Scarlet"; 8. "After the Curtain - The Lily Outgrows the Valley"
Aikawa Jun takes Ii-chan with her to rescue a friend in a high school that trains girls to kill.
4	Psycho Logical (Part One) Gaisuke Utsurigi's Nonsense Killer; Saiko Rojikaru (Jou): Utsurigi Gaisuke no Zaregoto Goroshi (サイコロジカル〈上〉兎吊木垓輔の戯言殺し)	November 5, 2002; October 15, 2008; 978-4-06-182283-2	—
Ii-chan and Tomo visit a secret laboratory to rescue one of her hacker friends.
5	Psycho Logical (Part Two): Attractive Kouta; Saiko Rojikaru (Ge): Hikaremono no Kouta (サイコロジカル〈下〉曳かれ者の小唄)	November 5, 2002; October 15, 2008; 978-4-06-182284-9	—
As Ii-chan tries to solve the murder, he crosses paths with a thief.
6	Cannibal Magical: Niounomiya Siblings, Masters of Carnage; Hitokui Majikaru: Satsuriku Kijutsu no Niounomiya Kyōdai (ヒトクイマジカル 殺戮奇術の匂宮兄妹)	July 5, 2003; December 12, 2008; 978-4-06-182323-5	—
Ii-chan meets the Niounomiya twins -- she's a detective; he kills people -- and makes himself an enemy.
7	Uprooted Radical (Part One): The Thirteen Stairs; Nekosogi Rajikaru (Jou): Jūsan Kaidan (ネコソギラジカル〈上〉十三階段)	February 8, 2005; February 13, 2009; 978-4-06-182393-8	—
Ii-chan's enemy declares it is time for their final battle, and assembles thirteen companions to fight him.
8	Uprooted Radical (Part Two): Overkill Red vs. The Orange Seed; Nekosogi Rajikaru (Chuu): Akaki Seisai vs. Daidainaru Shu (ネコソギラジカル〈中〉赤き征裁vs.橙なる種)	June 7, 2005; April 15, 2009; 978-4-06-182399-0	—
Aikawa Jun must fight her successor, Ii-chan's old friend Omokage Magokoro.
9	Uprooted Radical (Part Three): The Blue Savant and the Nonsense Bearer; Nekosogi Rajikaru (Ge): Aoiro Savan to Zaregoto Tsukai (ネコソギラジカル〈下〉青色サヴァンと戯言遣い)	November 8, 2005; June 12, 2009; 978-4-06-182400-3	—
As his enemy's plans crumble, Ii-chan takes the initiative.
10	Kidnap Kidding: The Blue Savant and the Daughter of the Nonsense User; Kidonapu Kidingu: Aoiro Savant to Zaregotozukai no Musume (キドナプキディング 青色サヴァンと戯言遣いの娘)	February 8, 2023; 978-4-06-530234-7	—
Kunagisa Jun, a 15 years old high school girl, is kidnapped by Jun Aikawa and sent to the stronghold of the Kunagisa organization, Kunagisa Castle.

==== Ningen series ====
No.	Title	Japanese release date	Japanese ISBN
1	Soushiki Zerozaki's Human Experiment; Zerozaki Soushiki no Ningen Shiken (零崎双識の人間試験)	February 5, 2004; December 15, 2011	978-4-06-182359-4
2	Kishishiki Zerozaki's Human Knock; Zerozaki Kishishiki no Ningen Knock (零崎軋識の人間ノック)	November 8, 2006; May 15, 2012	978-4-06-182509-3
3	Magashiki Zerozaki's Human Character; Zerozaki Magashiki no Ningen Ningen (零崎曲識の人間人間)	March 7, 2008; November 15, 2012	978-4-06-182582-6
4	Hitoshiki Zerozaki's Human Relations: Relations with Izumu Niounomiya; Zerozaki Hitoshiki no Ningen Kankei: Nyounomiya Izumu to no Kankei (零崎双識の人間試験)	March 25, 2010; October 15, 2014	978-4-06-182679-3
5	Hitoshiki Zerozaki's Human Relations: Relations with Iori Mutou; Zerozaki Hitoshiki no Ningen Kankei: Mutou Iori to no Kankei (零崎人識の人間関係 無桐伊織との関係)	March 25, 2010; October 15, 2014	978-4-06-182680-9
6	Hitoshiki Zerozaki's Human Relations: Relations with Soushiki Zerozaki; Zerozaki Hitoshiki no Ningen Kankei: Zerozaki Soushiki to no Kankei (零崎人識の人間関係 零崎双識との関係)	March 25, 2010; October 15, 2014	978-4-06-182681-6
7	Hitoshiki Zerozaki's Human Relations: Relations with the Nonsense Bearer; Zerozaki Hitoshiki no Ningen Kankei: Zaregoto Tsukai to no Kankei (零崎人識の人間関係 戯言遣いとの関係)	March 25, 2010; October 15, 2014	978-4-06-182682-3

==== Saikyō series ====
Volume		Chapter	Mephisto magazine appearance	Novel release
1	The First Love of Humanity's Strongest (人類最強の初恋, Jinrui Saikyō no Hatsukoi)	1. The First Love of Humanity's Strongest (人類最強の初恋)	Vol. 1 (April 4, 2014); ISBN 978-4-06-218932-3	April 23, 2015; ISBN 978-4-06-299040-0
1	The First Love of Humanity's Strongest (人類最強の初恋, Jinrui Saikyō no Hatsukoi)	2. The Unrequited Love of Humanity's Strongest (人類最強の失恋)	Vol. 2 (August 8, 2014); ISBN 978-4-06-219150-0	April 23, 2015; ISBN 978-4-06-299040-0
2	The Pure Love of Humanity's Strongest (人類最強の純愛, Jinrui Saikyō no Jun'ai)	1. The Passionate Love of Humanity's Strongest (人類最強の熱愛)	Vol. 3 (December 5, 2014); ISBN 978-4-06-219288-0	May 7, 2016; ISBN 978-4-06-299074-5
2	The Pure Love of Humanity's Strongest (人類最強の純愛, Jinrui Saikyō no Jun'ai)	2. The Flirting of Humanity's Strongest (人類最強の求愛)	Vol. 1 (April 7, 2015); ISBN 978-4-06-219442-6	May 7, 2016; ISBN 978-4-06-299074-5
2	The Pure Love of Humanity's Strongest (人類最強の純愛, Jinrui Saikyō no Jun'ai)	3. The Pure Love of Humanity's Strongest (人類最強の純愛)	Vol. 2 (August 6, 2015); ISBN 978-4-06-219639-0	May 7, 2016; ISBN 978-4-06-299074-5
2	The Pure Love of Humanity's Strongest (人類最強の純愛, Jinrui Saikyō no Jun'ai)	4. Jun Aikawa's Failure Miss/ion1: 4321 Scribbles (哀川潤の失敗 Miss/ion1. 4321枚の落書き)	Vol. 1 (April 8, 2010); ISBN 978-4-06-216154-1	May 7, 2016; ISBN 978-4-06-299074-5
2	The Pure Love of Humanity's Strongest (人類最強の純愛, Jinrui Saikyō no Jun'ai)	5. Jun Aikawa's Failure Miss/ion2: The Altercation Association (哀川潤の失敗 Miss/ion2. 仲間割れ同好会)	Vol. 2 (August 6, 2010); ISBN 978-4-06-216485-6	May 7, 2016; ISBN 978-4-06-299074-5
3	The Heartbeat of Humanity's Strongest (人類最強のときめき, Jinrui Saikyō no Tokimeki)	1. The Heartbeat of Humanity's Strongest (人類最強のときめき)	Vol. 3 (December 3, 2015); ISBN 978-4-06-219845-5	April 20, 2017; ISBN 978-4-06-299093-6
3	The Heartbeat of Humanity's Strongest (人類最強のときめき, Jinrui Saikyō no Tokimeki)	2. The Love Affair of Humanity's Strongest (人類最強のよろめき)	Vol. 1 (April 7, 2016); ISBN 978-4-06-220027-1	April 20, 2017; ISBN 978-4-06-299093-6
3	The Heartbeat of Humanity's Strongest (人類最強のときめき, Jinrui Saikyō no Tokimeki)	3. Jun Aikawa's Failure Miss/ion3: Happy Enough to Die (哀川潤の失敗 Miss/ion3. 死ぬほど幸せ)	Vol. 3 (December 8, 2010); ISBN 978-4-06-216747-5	April 20, 2017; ISBN 978-4-06-299093-6
3	The Heartbeat of Humanity's Strongest (人類最強のときめき, Jinrui Saikyō no Tokimeki)	4. Jun Aikawa's Failure Miss/ion4: Battle of Wits with the Digital Detective; (哀川潤の失敗 Miss/ion4. デジタル探偵との知恵比べ)	Vol. 1 (April 8, 2011); ISBN 978-4-06-216978-3	April 20, 2017; ISBN 978-4-06-299093-6
3	The Heartbeat of Humanity's Strongest (人類最強のときめき, Jinrui Saikyō no Tokimeki)	5. Jun Aikawa's Failure Miss/ion5: The Undefeated Gambler and the Failed Contractor; (哀川潤の失敗 Miss/ion5. 不敗のギャンブラーと失敗の請負人)	Vol. 2 (August 5, 2011); ISBN 978-4-06-217227-1	April 20, 2017; ISBN 978-4-06-299093-6
4	The Sweetheart of Humanity's Strongest (人類最強のsweetheart, Jinrui Saikyō no Sweetheart)	1. The Love Song of Humanity's Strongest (人類最強のlove song)	Vol. 3 (December 8, 2016)	May 11, 2020; ISBN 978-4-06-519765-3
4	The Sweetheart of Humanity's Strongest (人類最強のsweetheart, Jinrui Saikyō no Sweetheart)	2. The XOXO of Humanity's Strongest (人類最強のXOXO（キスハグキスハグ）)	Vol. 1 (April 6, 2017)	May 11, 2020; ISBN 978-4-06-519765-3
4	The Sweetheart of Humanity's Strongest (人類最強のsweetheart, Jinrui Saikyō no Sweetheart)	3. The Love Fortune of Humanity's Strongest (人類最強の恋占い)	Anime Kubikiri Cycle book (November 29, 2017); ISBN 978-4-06-220773-7	May 11, 2020; ISBN 978-4-06-519765-3
4	The Sweetheart of Humanity's Strongest (人類最強のsweetheart, Jinrui Saikyō no Sweetheart)	4. The Sweetheart of Humanity's Strongest (人類最強のsweetheart)	Vol. 2 (August 9, 2017)	May 11, 2020; ISBN 978-4-06-519765-3
4	The Sweetheart of Humanity's Strongest (人類最強のsweetheart, Jinrui Saikyō no Sweetheart)	5. The June Bride of Humanity's Strongest (人類最強のJUNE BRIDE)	Vol. 3 (December 7, 2017)	May 11, 2020; ISBN 978-4-06-519765-3
4	The Sweetheart of Humanity's Strongest (人類最強のsweetheart, Jinrui Saikyō no Sweetheart)	6. The Platonic of Humanity's Strongest (人類最強のPLATONIC)	Vol. 1 (April 5, 2018)	May 11, 2020; ISBN 978-4-06-519765-3
4	The Sweetheart of Humanity's Strongest (人類最強のsweetheart, Jinrui Saikyō no Sweetheart)	7. The Honeymoon of Humanity's Strongest (人類最強のhoneymoon)	—	May 11, 2020; ISBN 978-4-06-519765-3
5	The Venice of Humanity's Strongest (人類最強のヴェネチア, Jinrui Saikyō no Venechia)	1. The Great Wall of China (万里の長城)	Vol. 1 (April 8, 2020)	November 11, 2020; ISBN 978-4-06-521559-3
5	The Venice of Humanity's Strongest (人類最強のヴェネチア, Jinrui Saikyō no Venechia)	2. Lido Island (リド島)	Vol. 1 (April 8, 2020)	November 11, 2020; ISBN 978-4-06-521559-3
5	The Venice of Humanity's Strongest (人類最強のヴェネチア, Jinrui Saikyō no Venechia)	3. The Main Island of Venice (1) (ヴェネチア本島 (1))	Vol. 1 (April 8, 2020)	November 11, 2020; ISBN 978-4-06-521559-3
5	The Venice of Humanity's Strongest (人類最強のヴェネチア, Jinrui Saikyō no Venechia)	4. The Main Island of Venice (2) (ヴェネチア本島 (2))	Vol. 1 (April 8, 2020)	November 11, 2020; ISBN 978-4-06-521559-3
5	The Venice of Humanity's Strongest (人類最強のヴェネチア, Jinrui Saikyō no Venechia)	5. The Main Island of Venice (3) (ヴェネチア本島 (3))	Vol. 1 (April 8, 2020)	November 11, 2020; ISBN 978-4-06-521559-3
5	The Venice of Humanity's Strongest (人類最強のヴェネチア, Jinrui Saikyō no Venechia)	6. Murano Island (ムラーノ島)	Vol. 1 (April 8, 2020)	November 11, 2020; ISBN 978-4-06-521559-3
5	The Venice of Humanity's Strongest (人類最強のヴェネチア, Jinrui Saikyō no Venechia)	7. San Michele Island (サン・ミケーレ島)	Vol. 1 (April 8, 2020)	November 11, 2020; ISBN 978-4-06-521559-3
5	The Venice of Humanity's Strongest (人類最強のヴェネチア, Jinrui Saikyō no Venechia)	8. Torcello Island (トルチェッロ島)	Vol. 1 (April 8, 2020)	November 11, 2020; ISBN 978-4-06-521559-3
5	The Venice of Humanity's Strongest (人類最強のヴェネチア, Jinrui Saikyō no Venechia)	9. The Main Island of Venice (4) (ヴェネチア本島 (4))	Vol. 1 (April 8, 2020)	November 11, 2020; ISBN 978-4-06-521559-3
5	The Venice of Humanity's Strongest (人類最強のヴェネチア, Jinrui Saikyō no Venechia)	10. The Main Island of Venice (5) (ヴェネチア本島 (5))	Vol. 1 (April 8, 2020)	November 11, 2020; ISBN 978-4-06-521559-3
5	The Venice of Humanity's Strongest (人類最強のヴェネチア, Jinrui Saikyō no Venechia)	11. The Main Island of Venice (6) (ヴェネチア本島 (6))	Vol. 1 (April 8, 2020)	November 11, 2020; ISBN 978-4-06-521559-3
5	The Venice of Humanity's Strongest (人類最強のヴェネチア, Jinrui Saikyō no Venechia)	12. The Main Island of Venice (7) (ヴェネチア本島 (7))	Vol. 1 (April 8, 2020)	November 11, 2020; ISBN 978-4-06-521559-3
5	The Venice of Humanity's Strongest (人類最強のヴェネチア, Jinrui Saikyō no Venechia)	13. The Main Island of Venice (8) (ヴェネチア本島 (8))	Vol. 1 (April 8, 2020)	November 11, 2020; ISBN 978-4-06-521559-3
5	The Venice of Humanity's Strongest (人類最強のヴェネチア, Jinrui Saikyō no Venechia)	14. The Main Island of Venice (9) (ヴェネチア本島 (9))	Vol. 1 (April 8, 2020)	November 11, 2020; ISBN 978-4-06-521559-3
5	The Venice of Humanity's Strongest (人類最強のヴェネチア, Jinrui Saikyō no Venechia)	15. ???? (????)	Vol. 1 (April 8, 2020)	November 11, 2020; ISBN 978-4-06-521559-3
5	The Venice of Humanity's Strongest (人類最強のヴェネチア, Jinrui Saikyō no Venechia)	Final. Kamo-Ohashi Bridge (加茂大橋)	Vol. 1 (April 8, 2020)	November 11, 2020; ISBN 978-4-06-521559-3

=== Manga ===
A manga adaptation of the first novel in the Ningen series, Zerozaki Soushiki no Ningen Shiken (零崎双識の人間試験), was serialized in Kodansha's seinen manga magazine Monthly Afternoon. Illustrated by Iruka Shiomiya, it began serialization on September 24, 2011, and finished on August 24, 2013. Its chapters were compiled in five tankōbon volumes, released from December 22, 2011, to October 23, 2013.

Another manga adaptation, this time of the second novel in the Ningen series, Zerozaki Kishishiki no Ningen Knock (零崎軋識の人間ノック), was serialized in Monthly Afternoon. Illustrated by Chomoran, it began serialization on August 25, 2014, and finished on September 24, 2016. Its chapters were compiled in four tankōbon volumes, released from January 23, 2015, to November 22, 2016.

==== Zerozaki Soushiki no Ningen Shiken volumes ====
No.	Release date	ISBN
1	December 22, 2011	978-4-06-310795-1; 978-4-06-362206-5 (special edition)
2	May 23, 2012	978-4-06-387822-6; 978-4-06-362219-5 (special edition)
3	December 19, 2012	978-4-06-358418-9
4	April 23, 2013	978-4-06-387882-0
5	October 23, 2013	978-4-06-387930-8; 978-4-06-362262-1 (special edition)

==== Zerozaki Kishishiki no Ningen Knock volumes ====
No.	Release date	ISBN
1	January 23, 2015	978-4-06-388029-8
2	August 21, 2016	978-4-06-388076-2
3	March 23, 2016	978-4-06-388131-8
4	November 22, 2016	978-4-06-388213-1

=== Anime ===
An anime adaptation by Shaft was announced in May 2016, which was later confirmed to be an original video animation series adaptation of the novel series' first volume in August 2016. The anime series spans 8 episodes across 8 home video release volumes, which were released between October 26, 2016, and September 27, 2017. The series is directed by Yuki Yase and Akiyuki Shinbo, and written by Yukito Kizawa and Munemasa Nakamoto, featuring character designs by Akio Watanabe and music by Yuki Kajiura. The opening theme song is "Cobalt World" by Sangatsu no Phantasia, and the ending theme song is "Märchen" by Kalafina. The final episode, episode 8, was produced with assistance from studio Peace & Kindness. The series has several chief animation directors: Akio Watanabe himself, Hirofumi Suzuki of Naruto fame (who worked with Shinbo on Le Portrait de Petit Cossette), and Rina Iwamoto (from CUES). Akihisa Takano (from Shaft) joined as chief animation director starting on episode 2, and Shaft's Hiroki Yamamura joined for the eighth and final episode as well.

Long before the anime's announcement, Shaft had interest in producing an adaptation of the series, which character designer Akio Watanabe said was the initial work that he was contacted by studio president Mitsutoshi Kubota for. However, plans for the series were quickly scrapped, and instead Watanabe was asked to create the designs for Bakemonogatari.

==== Episode list ====
No.	Title	Directed by (Note: Information is taken from the ending credits of each episode.)	Storyboarded by	Original release date
1	"Day 3 (1) The Savant's Ultramarine"	Yuki Yase (Note: Assisted by Hisashi Sugawara.)	Yuki Yase	October 26, 2016
"I" is seen sitting with Jun Aikawa and thinking about the behaviour of human beings. It's the third day of his stay on Wet Crow's Feather Island and he attends to his friend, the precocious computer genius Tomo Kunagisa. During the morning, he encounters some of the geniuses and other inhabitants on the island. He sits with the scholar Akane Sonoyama who has little time for artists like Kanami Ibuki. He then meets the cynical fortune-teller Maki Himena who appears capable of using her skills in a quite manipulative way. Later he meets the self-critical painter Kanami Ibuki. When "I" mentions that he heard that she and Sonoyama are on bad terms, Kanami calmy states that she hates Sonoyama.
2	"Day 3 (2) Assembly and Arithmetic"	Takuma Suzuki	Unknown	November 30, 2016
"I" sits down to an elaborate dinner with the eleven other residents on the Island at a huge round table with twelve places. During the meal, Iria Akagami announces that Jun Aikawa will arrive in six days, and that Kunagisa will be leaving. Also, the conversation becomes quite catty as some of the diners make pointed criticisms of others at the table. Later, over drinks, Maki Himena apologises to "I" for her comments about him over dinner, but after reading "I"'s thoughts about her, she criticises him again. There is a sudden, mild earthquake. Himena then describes "I"'s personalty, which, although he denies it, he realizes is very accurate. Late that night Kanami Ibuki's headless body is found in her locked room, surrounded by spilled paint.
3	"Day 4 (1) Beheading 1"	Hajime Ootani	Yuki Yase; Hajime Ootani	January 25, 2017
The next morning, the remaining eleven residents piece together the events of the previous night and all except Sonoyama provide alibis. A debate ensues about whether the murder happened before or after the earthquake based in the spilled paint without any tell-tale footprints, but is inconclusive. They agree to confine the primary suspect, Sonoyama. Iria Akagami decides not to notify the police, but rely on Aikawa instead to solve mystery when she arrives in five days. Meanwhile "I" and Kunagisa discuss the evidence and investigate Ibuki's room. While there, Ibuki's assistant, Shinya, arrives and decides to bury her body rather than leave it in the room.
4	"Day 4 (2) The 0.14 Tragedy"	Tomoko Hiramuki	Yuki Yase; Kazuya Shiotsuki	February 22, 2017
Kunagisa uses her computer system to research the other inhabitants on the island. When "I" confronts Iria Akagami about why she will not involve the police she says that even if guilty, geniuses are not equal under the law, but he mistrusts her answer. "I" has a conversation with Akane in which she analyses his character. Kunagisa tells Hikari that the paint was most likely spilled after the murder explaining the lack of the murder's footprints, a possibility that Sonoyama had probably already deduced. Kunagisa then learns from her sources that Sonoyama and Ibuki had had lunch together 6 months ago.
5	"Day 5 (1) Beheading 2"	Takuma Suzuki	Hajime Ootani	March 29, 2017
Hikari wakes "I" with unspecified accusations, and then takes him and Kunagisa to where they see the headless body of Akane, again in a locked room with no apparent exits apart from a very high window. The ten remaining residents try to deduce who may be the murderer, but the results are inconclusive and "I" suggests that they form into three teams so no-one is alone: Team A, consisting of "I", Kunagisa and Hikari; Team B consisting of Himena, Sakaki and Sashirono; Team C consisting of Iria Akagami, Rei Handa, Chiga Akari, Chiga Hikari and Chiga Teruko. When "I", Kunagisa and Hikari return to Kunagisa's room, they find her computer system destroyed during the time all of the residents were at the meeting. "I", Kunagisa and Hikari investigate the window to Akane's room, but find no plausible solution to the mystery of her death.
6	"Day 5 (2) Lies"	Tomoko Hiramuki; Takanori Yano	Yuki Yase; Hajime Ootani	June 7, 2017
Kunagisa returns with Hikari to her room while "I" goes to discuss the situation with Iria and need for police intervention. Iria is unhelpful and asks Teruko to escort "I" back to Kunagisa. On the way Teruko reveals that the triplet maids share their personalities and memories. She also tells "I" that Iria is a twin who killed her sister Odette by way of explaining Iria's reluctance to call the police. However, "I" has trouble distinguishing between what she says is true and what is a lie. "I" begins to piece together all of the information that he's gathered to try and make sense of the two murders and the destruction of Kunagisa's computers. In discussion with Yayoi, "I" discovers that Iria provided an alibi for Rei during the first murder, and that Iria may have ordered the murders. Yayoi confesses that she fears for her own life and suggests that Kunagisa may be the next victim. "I" considers all of the information they have gathered and his own observations and believes that he has the solution to the mystery but as yet, no proof.
7	"Day 5 (3) Wet Wing Raven"	Yuki Yase	Yuki Yase	September 7, 2017
"I" suspects Akane is alive and the killer. Iria is actually the maid Rei and Rei is Iria enjoying the prank.
8	"Week's End - Split"	Yuki Yase; Tomoko Hiramuki; Takashi Asami	Shinsaku Sasaki	September 27, 2017
"I" is correct but incorrect. Jun shows up as a badass and explains that Akane and Kanami swapped identities 6 months prior due to boredom of being a genius known for one activity. However, the real Kanami wanted to permanently keep the identity Akane and with the assistance of Sakaki, they killed Kanami and ate her brain. They planned both locked rooms and faked death by re-using the real Akane's dead body from the first murder. Iria enjoys the detective show and bans Sakaki and Kanami from the island. "I" realizes his half attempted detective activities meant nothing in this nonsensical world. "I" leaves the island with Tomo.

==== Character commentary ====
Character commentaries are available on the DVD/BD releases of Kubikiri Cycle. Jun Aikawa receives some characters from the whole series for a conversation about the specific episode they are in. Nisio Isin wrote each commentary of the eight episodes.

- Kubikiri Cycle The Blue Savant and the Nonsense User 1 (クビキリサイクル 青色サヴァンと戯言遣い 1, Kubikiri Saikuru Aoiro Savan to Zaregoto Tsukai 1) (Aniplex. 2016)
  - feat. Jun Aikawa and Toromi Nagatoro
- Kubikiri Cycle The Blue Savant and the Nonsense User 2 (クビキリサイクル 青色サヴァンと戯言遣い 2, Kubikiri Saikuru Aoiro Savan to Zaregoto Tsukai 2) (Aniplex. 2016)
  - feat. Jun Aikawa and Gazelle Inpara
- Kubikiri Cycle The Blue Savant and the Nonsense User 3 (クビキリサイクル 青色サヴァンと戯言遣い 3, Kubikiri Saikuru Aoiro Savan to Zaregoto Tsukai 3) (Aniplex. 2017)
  - feat. Jun Aikawa and Miyori Jikumoto
- Kubikiri Cycle The Blue Savant and the Nonsense User 4 (クビキリサイクル 青色サヴァンと戯言遣い 4, Kubikiri Saikuru Aoiro Savan to Zaregoto Tsukai 4) (Aniplex. 2017)
  - feat. Jun Aikawa and Kōta Ishimaru
- Kubikiri Cycle The Blue Savant and the Nonsense User 5 (クビキリサイクル 青色サヴァンと戯言遣い 5, Kubikiri Saikuru Aoiro Savan to Zaregoto Tsukai 5) (Aniplex. 2017)
  - feat. Jun Aikawa and Sasaki Sasa
- Kubikiri Cycle The Blue Savant and the Nonsense User 6 (クビキリサイクル 青色サヴァンと戯言遣い 6, Kubikiri Saikuru Aoiro Savan to Zaregoto Tsukai 6) (Aniplex. 2017)
  - feat. Jun Aikawa and Toromi Nagatoro and Gazelle Inpara
- Kubikiri Cycle The Blue Savant and the Nonsense User 7 (クビキリサイクル 青色サヴァンと戯言遣い 7, Kubikiri Saikuru Aoiro Savan to Zaregoto Tsukai 7) (Aniplex. 2017)
  - feat. Jun Aikawa and Yayoi Sashirono
- Kubikiri Cycle The Blue Savant and the Nonsense User 8 (クビキリサイクル 青色サヴァンと戯言遣い 8, Kubikiri Saikuru Aoiro Savan to Zaregoto Tsukai 8) (Aniplex. 2017)
  - feat. Jun Aikawa and I

== Reception ==
The Kubikiri Cycle, the first volume of Zaregoto series, won the 23rd Mephisto Prize in 2002.

The series has been selected by Takarajimasha's Kono Light Novel ga Sugoi! three times as one of the ten best light novels of the year: in 2005 when it ranked second, in 2006 when it topped the list, and in 2007 when it placed third.

The series was a bestseller, and grew in popularity as it went on. While the first volume debuted at number eight on the novel charts, the final volume debuted at number one and remained at the top for three weeks.
