= Fairytale (Kalafina song) =

Single by Kalafina

from the album Seventh Heaven
- B-side: "Serenato, Sprinter -instrumental-"
- Released: (Japan) December 24, 2008
- Genre: J-Pop
- Label: SME Records
- Songwriter: Yuki Kajiura

Kalafina singles chronology
"Sprinter/ARIA" (2008)	"Fairytale" (2008)	"Lacrimosa" (2009)

"fairytale" is the 3rd single by Japanese girl group Kalafina, featuring Wakana Ootaki, Keiko Kubota and Hikaru Masai. The title track was used as the theme song for the sixth chapter of Kara no Kyoukai while "serenato" has no connection to Kara no Kyoukai.

== Track listing ==
Catalog Number

SECL-735

Track listing

1. fairytale
2. serenato
3. sprinter -instrumental-

== Charts ==
Chart	Peak position	Sales
Oricon Weekly Singles	9	20,252
