= Hikari no Senritsu =

Single by Kalafina

from the album Red Moon
- B-side: "sapphire"
- Released: January 20, 2010
- Genre: J-Pop
- Label: SME Records
- Songwriter: Yuki Kajiura

Kalafina singles chronology
"Progressive" (2009)	"Hikari no Senritsu" (2010)	"Kagayaku Sora no Shijima ni wa" (2010)

"Hikari no Senritsu" (光の旋律, Melody of Light) is the 7th single of Japanese girl group Kalafina. The title track is the opening theme to the anime series Sound of the Sky (So Ra No Wo To).

== Track list ==
=== CD ===
All tracks are written by Yuki Kajiura.

CD (SECL-838)
No.	Title	Length
1.	"Hikari no Senritsu (光の旋律)"
2.	"sapphire"
3.	"Hikari no Senritsu ~instrumental~ (光の旋律)"

=== DVD ===
DVD (SECL-836~7)
No.	Title	Length
1.	"Hikari no Senritsu (光の旋律)" (PV)
2.	"So Ra No Wo To trailer"
3.	"So Ra No Wo To TV spot" (15 second version)
4.	"So Ra No Wo To TV spot" (30 second version)

== Charts ==
Chart	Peak position	Sales	Time in chart
Oricon Weekly Singles	#7	20,281	11 weeks
