= Wakana (singer, born 1984) =

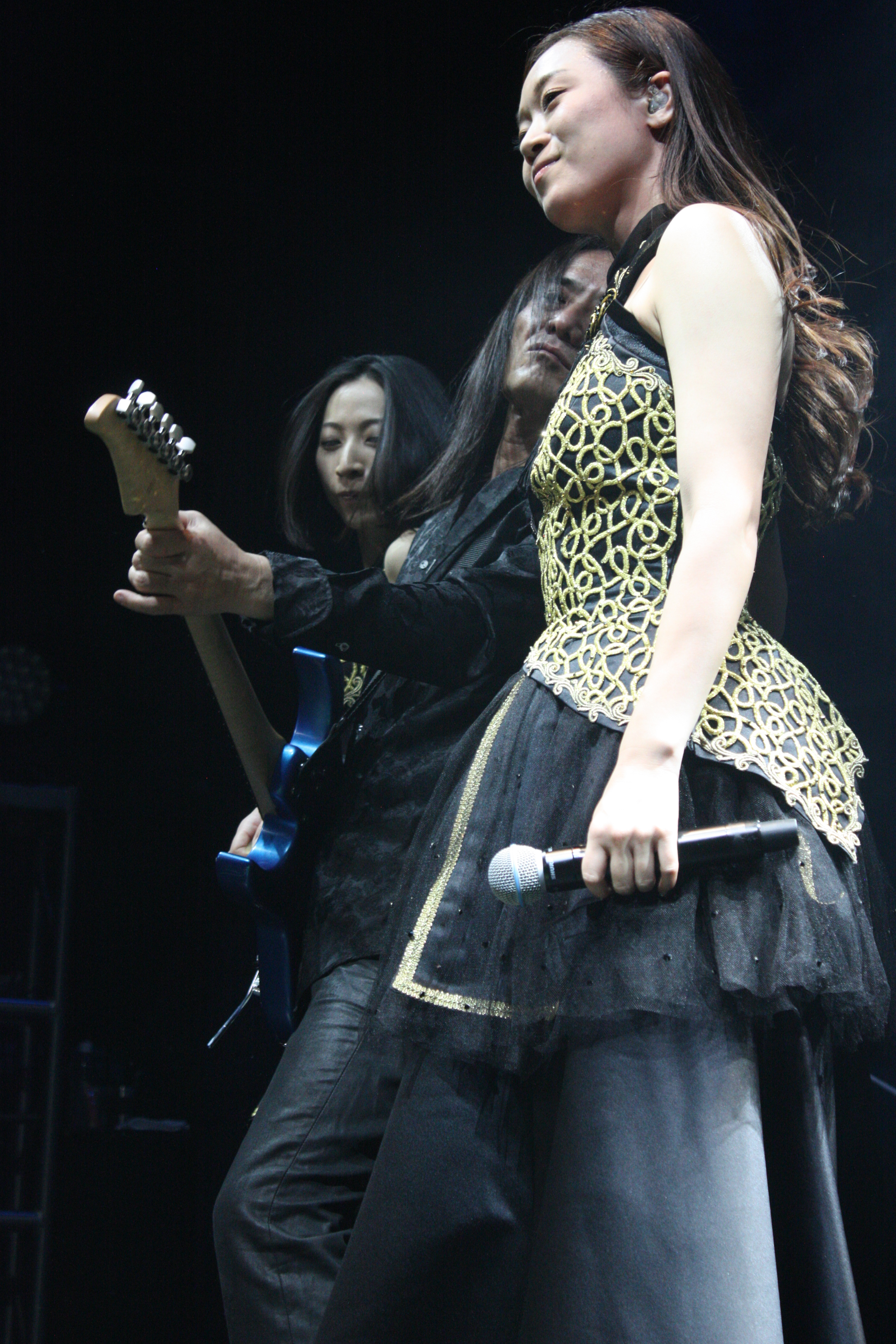
- Wakana (right) in 2016

Background information
- Also known as: FictionJunction Wakana
- Born: Wakana Ootaki; December 10, 1984 (age 41); Fukuoka Prefecture, Japan
- Genres: J-pop, anison
- Occupations: Singer
- Instruments: Vocals
- Years active: 2005–present
- Label: Victor Entertainment
- Member of: Kalafina
- Formerly of: FictionJunction
- Website: www.jvcmusic.co.jp/wakana/

Wakana Ootaki (大滝若奈, Ōtaki Wakana; born December 10, 1984) is a Japanese pop singer. She was one of the vocalists of the FictionJunction project started by Yuki Kajiura, and is a core member of the vocal group Kalafina. She is currently signed with Victor Entertainment with a solo career, having released two albums and an EP that have charted on Oricon.

== Biography ==
Wakana is from Fukuoka. She started learning singing at age 12. She joined the FictionJunction project in 2005, where she performed on many of Yuki Kajiura's soundtracks for anime shows and films. She performed two songs for the original soundtrack of Fist of the North Star True Saviour Legend: "Hikari no Yukue" (光の行方; "Where the Lights Are") and the Japanese version of "Where the Lights Are" bonus track. She sang "Paradise Regained" (an insert song for El Cazador de la Bruja) and in the Pandora Hearts soundtrack.

In 2007, she and FictionJunction colleague Keiko joined Kajiura's new vocal group Kalafina, which was put together to sing the theme songs for The Garden of Sinners film series. Their first single was "Oblivious" which reached number 8 on the Oricon charts. Vocalists Hikaru and Maya joined the group for the singles "Sprinter/Aria", after which Maya left the group, resulting in a trio. Over the next ten years, Kalafina would continue to release more anime theme songs as well as original material, with five studio albums and two compilation albums that have charted in Oricon's top 10. In 2018, Kajiura resigned from Space Craft, and Keiko left the group soon afterwards. The group was officially disbanded in 2019.

Wakana moved from Space Craft to Victor Entertainment. She had a solo debut with the single "Toki o Koeru Yoru Ni" in February 2019. She released a self-titled album in March and an EP titled Aki no Sakura in November. They reached No. 19 and No. 34 respectively on the Oricon charts. She released the album magic moment in 2020, which charted at No. 22. On April 24, 2021, she held her solo concert Wakana Spring Live 2020 ~ magic moment ~ in Ōtemachi to promote the album.

In October 2020, she released a cover album of anime songs. She won an award for Classic Anison Singer at the Weibo Account Festival in Tokyo 2020.

In May 2022, she announced a collaboration song with the mobile game "Memento Mori". Flag is used as a character song for Florence, voiced by Ayaka Suwa.

== Discography ==
=== Solo singles ===
List of singles, with selected chart positions
Year	Title	Oricon		Album
Year	Title	Peak position	Weeks charted	Album
2019	"Toki o Koeru Yoru Ni (時を越える夜に; "on a timeless night")"	36	2	Wakana

==== Other appearances ====
List of guest appearances that feature Wakana
Year	Title	Album
2022	"Flag" (Song. Wakana, CV: Ayaka Suwa)	—N/a
2023	"Mononoke hime"	Ghibli no utau

=== Studio albums ===
List of studio albums, with selected chart positions
Title	Album information	Oricon	
Title	Album information	Peak position	Weeks charted
Wakana	Released: March 20, 2019; Label: Victor Entertainment (VIZL-1573)	19	3
Aki no Sakura (アキノサクラ) EP	Released: November 20, 2019; Label: Victor Entertainment (VICL-65270)	34	2
magic moment	Released: February 26, 2020; Label: Victor Entertainment (VICL-1731)	22	2
Wakana Covers ~Anime Classics~	Released: December 9, 2020; Label: Victor Entertainment (VICL-65447, VICL-1830 (limited edition))	42	1
Sonosakie (そのさきへ)	Released: May 31, 2023; Label: Victor Entertainment (VICL-65821)	28	1

=== Video albums ===
List of video albums, with selected chart positions
Title	Album information	Oricon	
Title	Album information	Peak position	Weeks charted
Wakana Live Tour 2019 ～VOICE～ at 中野サンプラザ【初回限定盤】	Released: September 25, 2019; Label: Victor Entertainment (VIZL-1647); Format: Blu-Ray	30	2
Wakana Spring Live ～magic moment～2021(初回限定盤)	Released: August 11, 2021; Label: Victor Entertainment (VIZL-1914); Format: Blu-Ray	15	1
