= After Eden =

Studio album by Kalafina
- Released: 21 September 2011
- Recorded: 2010–2011
- Genre: J-Pop
- Label: SME Records
- Producer: Yuki Kajiura

Kalafina chronology
Red Moon (2010)	After Eden (2011)	Consolation (2013)

Singles from After Eden
- 1. "Kagayaku Sora no Shijima ni wa" Released: 15 September 2010; 2. "Magia" Released: 16 February 2011

After Eden is the third studio album by the Japanese girl group Kalafina.

== Track listing ==
All tracks are written by Yuki Kajiura.

CD (SECL-1014)
No.	Title	Length
1.	"Eden"	5:38
2.	"Sandpiper"	6:03
3.	"Magia"	5:09
4.	"Kugatsu (九月, September)"	3:42
5.	"In Your Eyes"	6:01
6.	"Destination Unknown"	5:03
7.	"Neverending"	4:22
8.	"Kotonoha (ことのは, Words)"	2:45
9.	"Magnolia"	5:47
10.	"Kagayaku Sora no Shijima ni wa (輝く空の静寂には, In the Silence of the Shining Sky)"	4:12
11.	"Mune no Yukue (胸の行方, Where the Heart Is)"	6:16
12.	"Snow falling"	4:38
13.	"symphonia"	5:44

DVD (SECL-1012)
No.	Title	Length
1.	"symphonia" (PV)
2.	"Kalafina at Anime Expo 2011 in Los Angeles" (documentary)

== Usage in media ==
- Magia: ending theme for anime television series Puella Magi Madoka Magica
- Kagayaku Sora no Shijima ni wa: insert song for anime television series Kuroshitsuji II
- symphonia: ending theme for NHK program "Rekishi Hiwa Historia II"

== Charts ==
Chart	Peak position	Sales
Oricon Weekly Albums	3	28,022
