= Progressive (song) =

Single by Kalafina

from the album Red Moon
- B-side: "Utsukushisa, Progressive -instrumental-"
- Released: (Japan) October 28, 2009
- Genre: J-Pop
- Label: Sony Music Japan
- Songwriter(s): Yuki Kajiura

Kalafina singles chronology
"Storia" (2009)	"Progressive" (2009)	"Hikari no Senritsu" (2010)

"Progressive" is Kalafina's sixth single. It is their first single which has no tie-in.

== Track listing ==
=== CD ===
All tracks are written by Yuki Kajiura

CD (SECL-816)
No.	Title	Length
1.	"progressive"	5:41
2.	"Utsukushisa (うつくしさ, Beauty)"	4:50
3.	"progressive ~instrumental~"	5:41
Total length:		16:11

=== DVD ===
DVD (SECL-814~5)
No.	Title	Content	Length
1.	"progressive" (PV)
2.	"Closed Premium Live" (Live footages)	1. love come down 2. Ongaku (音楽, Music); 3. Mata Kaze ga Tsuyoku Natta (また風が強くなった, The winds become strong again)
3.	"TOKYO MXTV de 7-gatsu on Air Sareta Artist Himitsu Document Bangumi "Utatane" Kalafina Version (TOKYO MXTVで7月にオンエアされたアーティスト密着ドキュメント番組 「うたたね」Kalafinaバージョン)"	Kalafina version of TV program Utatane

== Charts ==
Chart	Peak position	Sales
Oricon Weekly Singles	14	6,707
