= Kimi no Gin no Niwa =

Single by Kalafina
- Released: November 6, 2013
- Genre: J-pop
- Length: 5:07
- Label: Sony Music Entertainment Japan
- Songwriter: Yuki Kajiura
- Producer: Yuki Kajiura

Kalafina singles chronology
"Alleluia" (2013)	"Kimi no Gin no Niwa" (2013)	"heavenly blue" (2014)

"Kimi no Gin no Niwa" (君の銀の庭, Your Silver Garden) is the 14th single of Japanese girl group Kalafina. The song was used as the ending theme to the anime film Puella Magi Madoka Magica the Movie: Rebellion. The single peaked at No. 4 on Japan's weekly Oricon singles chart, having reached 37,259 units. As of 2013, "Kimi no Gin no Niwa" has become the best-selling single by Kalafina.

== Track listing ==
=== Regular edition ===
All tracks are written by Yuki Kajiura.

CD (SECL-1421)
No.	Title	Length
1.	"Kimi no Gin no Niwa"	5:07
2.	"misterioso"	4:02
3.	"Tsuioku"	4:37
4.	"Kimi no Gin no Niwa ~instrumental~"	5:06
Total length:		18:52

=== Limited edition ===
All tracks are written by Yuki Kajiura.

CD (SECL-1417/8)
No.	Title	Length
1.	"Kimi no Gin no Niwa"	5:07
2.	"misterioso"	4:02
3.	"Tsuioku"	4:37
4.	"Kimi no Gin no Niwa ~instrumental~"	5:06
Total length:		18:52

DVD (SECL-1417/8)
No.	Title	Length
1.	"Kimi no Gin no Niwa" (PV)

== Charts ==
Chart	Peak position
Oricon Weekly Singles	4
Japan Billboard Japan Hot 100	6
Japan Billboard Hot Single Sales	3
Japan Billboard hot animation	6
