= Magia (Kalafina song) =

2011 single by Kalafina

Single by Kalafina
- Released: February 16, 2011
- Label: Sony Music Japan
- Songwriter: Yuki Kajiura

Kalafina singles chronology
"Kagayaku Sora no Shijima ni wa" (2010)	"Magia" (2011)	"to the beginning" (2012)

"Magia" is the 9th single of Japanese girl group Kalafina. The title track is the ending theme to the anime series Puella Magi Madoka Magica. As of 2011, Magia is the best-selling single of Kalafina. A second iteration, "Magia (Quattro)", was used as the ending theme for the film adaptation, Puella Magi Madoka Magica Part 1: Beginnings, and was included on the single release of "Hikari Furu" on October 26, 2012. Mary's Blood recorded a heavy metal cover of the song for their 2020 cover album Re>Animator.

== Critique ==
CD Journal says, "A mysterious worldview is developed, like a journey through a fantasy space, and this world is expressed in an original rock style, with a medieval and oriental tone. The coupling track is a pure song with a silver-world atmosphere." he critiqued.

Jo Wada of Web Anime Style also commented, "The group's unique harmony is reminiscent of the medieval European choral technique of 'organum,' which was popular from the 9th to 12th centuries.

In Fusosha's "From Dorikan to Komucha: Golden Legend of Anime Songs!" Shigeru Miki described the song as "a gothic and rich sound, with themes such as the end of time and the end of the world repeated endlessly, amplifying the anxiety of the main subjects to our world," and "the charm of Kalafina's low tone can be fully appreciated.

== Track list ==
=== Regular edition ===
All tracks are written by Yuki Kajiura.

CD (SECL-941)
No.	Title	Length
1.	"Magia"	5:09
2.	"snow falling"	5:13
3.	"Magia ~instrumental~"	5:09
Total length:		15:04

=== Limited edition ===
All tracks are written by Yuki Kajiura.

CD (SECL-939)
No.	Title	Length
1.	"Magia"	5:09
2.	"snow falling"	5:13
3.	"Magia ~instrumental~"	5:09
Total length:		15:04

DVD (SECL-939)
No.	Title	Length
1.	"Magia" (PV)

=== Anime edition ===
All tracks are written by Yuki Kajiura.

CD (SECL-942)
No.	Title	Length
1.	"Magia"	5:09
2.	"Magia (magic mix)"	3:04
3.	"Magia (TV Version)"	1:30
4.	"Magia (instrumental)"	5:09
Total length:		15m02s

Notes:

1. The anime edition came without a DVD (only CD; the DVD is for the limited edition).
2. The anime edition was also limited and were available until the end of March, 2011.

== Charts ==
Chart	Peak position	Sales
Oricon Weekly Singles	7	48,403
