= Storia (song) =

"storia"

Single by Kalafina

from the album Red Moon
- B-side: "lirica"
- Released: (Japan) July 1, 2009
- Recorded: Sound Valley Studio; Warner Music Recording Studio; MIT Studio; Azabu West Studio
- Genre: J-Pop
- Label: SME Records
- Songwriter(s): Yuki Kajiura
- Producer(s): Yuki Kajiura

Kalafina singles chronology
"Lacrimosa" (2009)	"storia" (2009)	"Progressive" (2009)

"storia" is Kalafina's fifth single. The title track is the opening theme song of NHK's Rekishi Hiwa Historia, a historical documentary series. The single was also available as a limited edition release, containing a bonus DVD.

== Track listing ==
=== CD ===
All tracks are written by Yuki Kajiura

CD (SECL-788)
No.	Title	Length
1.	"storia"	3:38
2.	"lirica"	5:20
3.	"storia" (Instrumental)	3:38
Total length:		12:36

=== Limited edition DVD ===
DVD (SECL-786~7)
No.	Title	Length
1.	"storia" (PV)

== Charts ==
Chart	Peak position	Sales	Time in chart
Oricon Weekly Singles	15	7,093	4 weeks
