= Lacrimosa (Kalafina song) =

Single by Kalafina

from the album Red Moon
- B-side: "Gloria"
- Released: March 4, 2009
- Genre: J-Pop
- Length: 12:11
- Label: SME
- Songwriter(s): Yuki Kajiura
- Producer(s): Yuki Kajiura

Kalafina singles chronology
"Fairytale" (2008)	"Lacrimosa" (2009)	"Storia" (2009)

"Lacrimosa" is Kalafina's fourth single, featuring Wakana, Keiko and Hikaru. The single was released on March 4, 2009. The song was used as the closing theme to the anime television series Black Butler starting with episode 14. The single was also available as a limited edition release, containing a bonus DVD.

== Track listings ==
=== CD ===
All tracks are written by Yuki Kajiura

No.	Title	Length
1.	"Lacrimosa"	4:14
2.	"Gloria"	3:45
3.	"Lacrimosa (Instrumental)"	4:12
Total length:		12:11

=== Limited edition DVD ===
No.	Title	Length
1.	"Lacrimosa (Video Clip)"
2.	"Lacrimosa ("Black Butler" Credit-less Ending)" (Lacrimosa (『黒執事』ノンクレジットエンディング))

== Charts ==
Chart	Peak position	Sales
Oricon Weekly Singles	14	17,676
