= Kagayaku Sora no Shijima ni wa =

Single by Kalafina
- Released: (Japan) September 15, 2010
- Genre: J-pop
- Label: Sony Music Japan
- Songwriter: Yuki Kajiura

Kalafina singles chronology
"Hikari no Senritsu" (2010)	"Kagayaku Sora no Shijima ni wa" (2010)	"Magia" (2011)

"Kagayaku Sora no Shijima ni wa" (輝く空の静寂には, In the Silence of the Shining Sky) is the 8th single of Japanese girl group Kalafina. The title track is used as an ending theme (episode 8) and insert song in the anime series Kuroshitsuji II.

== Track list ==
All tracks are written by Yuki Kajiura.

CD (SECL-903-904)
No.	Title	Length
1.	"Kagayaku Sora no Shijima ni wa (輝く空の静寂には)"	4:12
2.	"adore"	5:13
3.	"Kagayaku Sora no Shijima ni wa ~instrumental~ (輝く空の静寂には)"	4:12

DVD (SECL-901)
No.	Title	Length
1.	"Kagayaku Sora no Shijima ni wa (輝く空の静寂には)" (PV)

== Charts ==
Chart	Peak position	Sales
Oricon Weekly Singles	14	11,769
