= Far on the Water =

Far on the water
- Regular edition cover

Studio album by Kalafina
- Released: 16 September 2015
- Recorded: 2014–2015
- Genre: J-Pop
- Length: 56:17
- Label: SME
- Producer: Yuki Kajiura

Kalafina chronology
The Best "Blue" /The Best "Red" (2014)	Far on the water (2015)

Singles from Far on the water
- 1. "heavenly blue" Released: 6 October 2014; 2. "believe" Released: 19 November 2014; 3. "ring your bell" Released: 13 May 2015; 4. "One Light" Released: 12 October 2015

Far on the Water is the fifth studio album by the Japanese music group Kalafina on 16 September 2015 under Sony Music Japan label.

== Track listing ==
All tracks are written by Yuki Kajiura

Regular Edition CD (SECL-1767)
No.	Title	Length
1.	"into the water"	1:37
2.	"monochrome"	3:32
3.	"Gogatsu no Mahou (五月の魔法, Magic of May)"	4:57
4.	"ring your bell"	5:16
5.	"Usumurasaki (うすむらさき, lilac)"	5:10
6.	"identify"	4:29
7.	"Hokage (灯影, flicker of light)"	3:11
8.	"One Light"	4:40
9.	"Musunde Hiraku (むすんでひらく, opening signed)"	5:21
10.	"heavenly blue"	5:23
11.	"Sora-iro no Isu (空色の椅子, sky-blue chair)"	3:18
12.	"believe"	4:52
13.	"far on the water"	4:31
Total length:		56:17

Limited Edition A DVD (SECL-1763~4) / Limited Edition B Blu-Ray (SECL-1765~6)
No.	Title	Length
1.	"heavenly blue (Music Video)"
2.	"far on the water (Music Video)"
3.	"ring your bell (2015.2.28 at Nippon Budokan)"
4.	"far on the water (2015.3.1 at Nippon Budokan)"

== Usage in media ==
- "heavenly blue": opening theme for anime Aldnoah.Zero
- "believe": first ending theme for anime Fate/stay night: Unlimited Blade Works
- "ring your bell": second ending theme song for anime Fate/stay night: Unlimited Blade Works
- "One Light": second ending theme song for anime The Heroic Legend of Arslan

== Charts ==
Chart	Peak position
Oricon Weekly Albums	2
