= Keiko (singer, born 1985) =

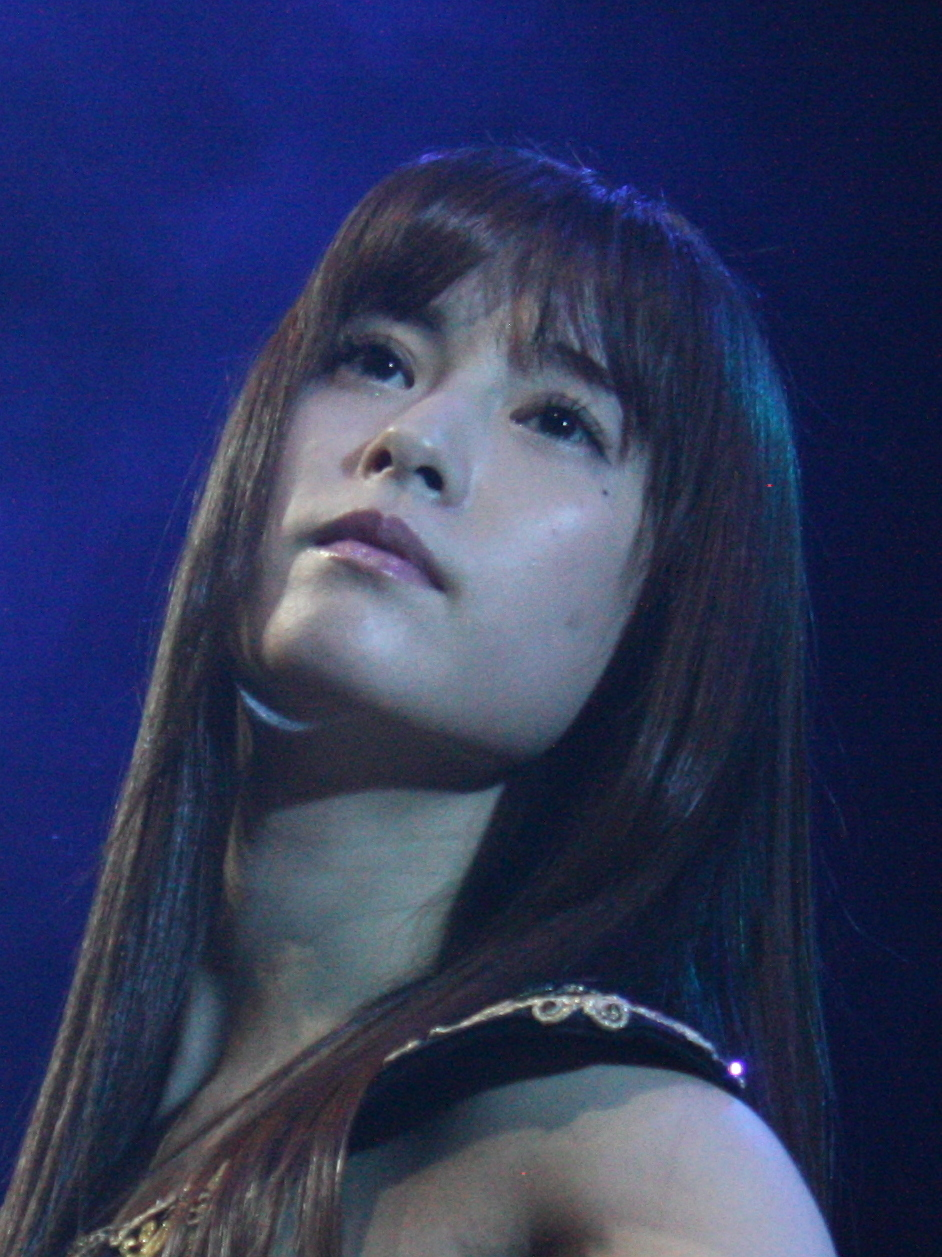
- Keiko in 2016

Background information
- Also known as: FictionJunction Keiko; Azuki Hino (日野あずき)
- Born: Keiko Kubota; December 5, 1985 (age 40)
- Origin: Shibuya, Tokyo, Japan
- Genres: Anison, J-pop
- Occupations: Singer
- Instruments: Vocals, piano, Guitar, violin
- Years active: 2005–present
- Label: Avex Trax (2020–present)
- Member of: Kalafina
- Formerly of: FictionJunction

Keiko Kubota (窪田啓子, Kubota Keiko; born December 5, 1985), known mononymously as Keiko (stylized all caps), is a Japanese pop singer. She was one of the vocalists of the FictionJunction project started by Yuki Kajiura, and is a core member of the vocal group Kalafina.

== Biography ==
Keiko is from Shibuya, Tokyo, Japan. Prior to FictionJunction and Kalafina, she was in a rock vocal duo called Itokubo. She joined the FictionJunction project in 2005, and has performed on many of Kajiura's soundtracks and theme songs for anime shows. "Kaze no Machi e" (風の街へ; "To the City of Wind") was used as an insert song in episodes 19 and 21 of the anime show Tsubasa: Reservoir Chronicle, and "Nohara" (野原; "Field") was the B-side for the FictionJunction single "Toki no Mukou, Maboroshi no Sora".

In 2007, she and FictionJunction member Wakana joined Kajiura's vocal project Kalafina, releasing the song "Oblivious". During her ten years there, Kalafina released five studio albums and two compilation albums, all of which have charted in the Oricon top 10. Space Craft describes her singing as a "captivating bass voice". Following the resignation of Kajiura from Space Craft, Keiko soon left the group in April 2018. She also rejoined FictionJunction for Kajiura's concert performance of tracks from the Princess Principal anime television series.

In April 2020, she announced she was working on a solo album with Avex Trax. Her first solo single, which has the songs "Inochi no Hana" and "Be Yourself", was released in May. "Inochi no Hana" was her first song where she wrote lyrics. In September, she held a live performance titled KEIKO First Live K001 – I'm home. Her studio album Lantana was released on December 2. Her solo concert KEIKO Live K002 ** Lantana * Saita yo to promote the album is scheduled for December 16 at Zepp Tokyo and includes a livestreaming of the event. Lantana reached No. 32 on the Oricon Albums Chart.

On January 15, 2025, Kalafina has reunited with a concert in Tokyo Garden Theater for their anniversary. Yuki Kajiura was not involved in this reunion concert. On January 27, details for FictionJunction/Yuki Kajiura LIVE vol.#21 were published and Keiko was not listed among the vocalists of the event.

== Discography ==
=== Singles ===
==== As lead artist ====
List of singles, with selected chart positions
Year	Title	Peak chart positions		Album
Year	Title	JPN Oricon	JPN Hot 100	Album
2020	Inochi no Hana (命の花, Flower of Life) / Be Yourself	—N/a	— (Note: "Inochi no Hana" did not enter Billboard Japan Hot 100 Chart, but peaked at position 77 on the component Billboard Japan Download Songs Chart.)	Lantana
2020	Ray / Hajimari wa (始まりは, The Beginning)	—N/a	—	Lantana
2021	Sakura wo Goran (桜をごらん, Look at the Cherry Blossoms) / Waratte Yaru (笑ってやる, I'll Laugh)	—N/a	—	dew
2021	"Nobody Knows You"	—N/a	—	dew
2021	Tōriame (通り雨, Street Rain)	—N/a	—	dew
2021	Genjitsu no Metaphor (現実のメタファー, Reality Metaphor)	—N/a	—	dew
2022	Hitori Janai Kara (ひとりじゃないから, I'm not Alone)	—N/a	—	CUTLERY
2022	"Alcohol"	—N/a	—	CUTLERY
2022	Yoru No Uso To (夜の嘘と, The Lie Of The Night)	—N/a	—	CUTLERY
2022	Kirai (キライ, I hate you)	—N/a	—	CUTLERY
2022	"Close to you"	—N/a	—	CUTLERY
2022	Amanojaku (天邪鬼)	—N/a	—	CUTLERY
2024	Yuyami no Uta (夕闇のうた)	29	—	Non-album single

==== As a collaborating artist ====
List of singles, with selected chart positions
Year	Title	Peak chart positions		Album
Year	Title	JPN Oricon	JPN Hot 100	Album
2021	"My Hero ~ kiseki no uta 〜" (My Hero〜奇跡の唄〜; "My Hero ~ Miracle Song ~") (with various artists) (Note: Artists who sang on "My Hero ~ kiseki no uta 〜" include: SSA (DA PUMP), Ohno Yudai & Hanamura Sota (from Da-iCE), Hiroya Ozaki, Kawamura Ryuichi, Yusaku Kiyama, Shō Kiryūin (Golden Bomber), KEIKO, Sunplaza Nakano-kun, Ami Suzuki, Shinji Nira (Wakadanna), HIKAKIN & SEIKIN, Pikotaro, hitomi, Beverly, FANTASTICS, Matsuura Kodai, Miracle Vell Magic, Kaori Mochida (Every Little Thing), YU-KI (TRF), YUKA (moumoon), Koda Kumi, LEC Kodomo Gasshoudan)	—	—	Pediatric Cancer Treatment Support Charity Live Theme Song

=== Studio albums ===
List of albums, with selected chart positions
Title	Album information	Oricon	
Title	Album information	Peak position	Weeks charted
Lantana	Release date: December 2, 2020; Label: Avex Trax; Catalog no.: AVCD-96602; Format: Digital download, CD	32	3
dew	Release date: December 8, 2021; Label: Avex Trax; Catalog no.: AVCD-96875; Format: Digital download, CD	52	2
Cutlery	Release date: February 8, 2023; Label: Avex Trax; Catalog no.: AVCD-63419; Format: Digital download, CD	37	1

=== Video albums ===
List of video albums, with selected chart positions
Title	Album details	Peak positions	
Title	Album details	JPN DVD	JPN Blu-ray
KEIKO Live K002 Lantana - Saitayo (KEIKO Live K002 Lantana 咲いたよ, Nanda Korekushon; "KEIKO Live K002 Lantana - Bloomed")	Release: March 10, 2021; Label: Avex Trax; Format: DVD, Blu-ray	55	27

=== Other appearances ===
List of non-studio album or guest appearances that features KEIKO
Title	Year	Album
"Kaze no Machi e" (風の街へ?; "To the City of Wind") (credited as FictionJunction KEIKO)	2005	Tsubasa Chronicle Future Soundscape II
