= Red Moon (Kalafina album) =

Studio album by Kalafina
- Released: 17 March 2010
- Recorded: 2009–2010
- Genre: J-Pop
- Length: 63:55
- Label: SME Records
- Producer: Yuki Kajiura

Kalafina chronology
| Seventh Heaven (2009) | Red Moon (2010) | After Eden (2011) |

Singles from Red Moon
- 1. "Lacrimosa" Released: 4 March 2009; 2. "Storia" Released: 1 July 2009; 3. "Progressive" Released: 28 October 2009; 4. "Hikari no Senritsu" Released: 20 January 2010

Red Moon is the second studio album by the Japanese girl group Kalafina, released on 17 March 2010 under Sony Music Japan label.

== Track listing ==
All tracks are written by Yuki Kajiura

| No. | Title | Length |
|---|---|---|
| 1. | "Red Moon" | 6:40 |
| 2. | "Hikari no Senritsu (光の旋律, Melody of Light)"" | 6:13 |
| 3. | "Te to Te to Me to Me (テトテトメトメ, Hand in Hand and Eye to Eye)" | 4:52 |
| 4. | "Fantasia" | 5:21 |
| 5. | "Haru wa Kogane no Yume no Naka (春は黄金の夢の中, Spring is in a Golden Dream)" | 3:55 |
| 6. | "Kyrie" | 5:32 |
| 7. | "Yami no Uta (闇の唄, Song of Darkness)" | 5:02 |
| 8. | "Hoshi no Utai (星の謡, Chant of the Stars)" | 4:50 |
| 9. | "storia" | 3:38 |
| 10. | "intermezzo" | 2:00 |
| 11. | "progressive" | 5:42 |
| 12. | "Lacrimosa" | 4:14 |
| 13. | "I have a dream" | 5:56 |
| Total length: | | 63:55 |

== Usage in media ==
- "I have a dream": theme song for the anime film Time of Eve: The Movie
- "Lacrimosa": ending theme for anime television series Black Butler
- "Hikari no Senritsu": opening theme for the anime television series Sound of the Sky

== Charts ==
| Chart | Peak position | Sales |
|---|---|---|
| Oricon Weekly Albums | 5 | 27,818 |
