= Seventh Heaven (Kalafina album) =

Studio album by Kalafina
- Released: March 4, 2009
- Recorded: 2008–2009
- Genres: J-pop; opera-pop; techno; symphonic rock
- Length: 67 minutes
- Label: SME
- Producer: Yuki Kajiura

Kalafina chronology
Re/Oblivious (2008)	Seventh Heaven (2009)	Red Moon (2010)

Singles from Seventh Heaven
- 1. "Oblivious" Released: January 23, 2008; 2. "Sprinter/Aria" Released: July 30, 2008; 3. "Fairytale" Released: December 24, 2008

Seventh Heaven is the first studio album by the Japanese girl group Kalafina, released on 26 May 2009 under Sony Music Japan label. The album was named after the theme song they performed for the seventh chapter of the Anime movie Kara no Kyoukai.

== Track listing ==
All tracks are written by Yuki Kajiura.

CD (SECL-765)
No.	Title	Length
1.	"overture" (instrumental)	1:34
2.	"oblivious"	4:22
3.	"love come down"	4:44
4.	"Natsu no Ringo (夏の林檎, Summer Apples)"	4:03
5.	"fairytale"	5:13
6.	"ARIA"	5:24
7.	"Mata Kaze ga Tsuyoku natta (また風が強くなった, The Wind Became Strong Again)"	4:57
8.	"Kizuato (傷跡, Scar)"	4:39
9.	"serenato"	4:53
10.	"Ongaku (音楽, Music)"	5:38
11.	"Ashita no Keshiki (明日の景色, The Scenery of Tomorrow)"	5:25
12.	"sprinter"	5:05
13.	"Kimi ga Hikari ni Kaete yuku (君が光に変えて行く, You Turn It Into Light)"	4:43
14.	"seventh heaven"	6:12

=== DVD ===
DVD (SECL-763~4)
No.	Title	Length
1.	"seventh heaven" (PV)
2.	"oblivious" (Yuki Kajiura live vol.#3 footage)
3.	"Kimi ga Hikari ni Kaete Iku" (Yuki Kajiura live vol.#3 footage)
4.	"Kizuato" (Yuki Kajiura live vol.#2 footage)
5.	"ARIA" (Yuki Kajiura live vol.#2 footage)

== Usage in media ==
- oblivious: ending theme song for Kara no Kyoukai Chapter 1
- fairy tale: ending theme song for Kara no Kyoukai Chapter 6
- Aria: ending theme song for Kara no Kyoukai Chapter 4
- Kizuato: ending theme for Kara no Kyoukai Chapter 3
- sprinter: ending theme for Kara no Kyoukai Chapter 5
- Kimi ga Hikari ni Kaete yuku: ending theme for Kara no Kyoukai Chapter 2
- seventh heaven: ending theme for Kara no Kyoukai Chapter 7

== Charts ==
Chart	Peak position	Sales	Time in chart
Oricon Weekly Albums	8	38,087	19 weeks

== Release history ==
Country	Date	Format	Label
Japan	March 4, 2009	Digital download, CD	SME Records
United States	May 26, 2009	Digital download, CD	SME Records
South Korea	September 9, 2011	Digital download, CD	SME Records
