= Hikaru (singer) =

Japanese singer

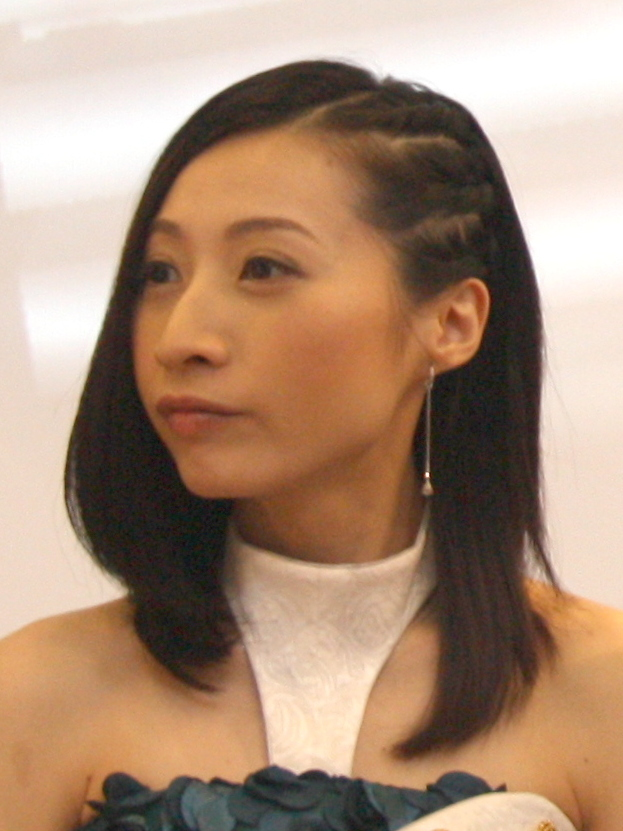

Background information
- Also known as: H-el-ical//
- Born: Hikaru Masai; July 2, 1987 (age 39); Toyama Prefecture, Japan
- Origin: Tokyo, Japan
- Genres: J-pop, anison
- Occupations: Singer
- Instruments: Vocals
- Years active: 2008–present
- Label: NBCUniversal Entertainment Japan (2020–present)
- Member of: Kalafina
- Website: h-el-ical.com

Hikaru Masai (born July 2, 1987), formerly known professionally as Helical (stylized H-el-ical//), is a Japanese pop singer. She was one of the core members of the vocal group Kalafina, which was started by Yuki Kajiura to perform anime television and film theme songs.

== Biography ==
She is from Toyama Prefecture. In 2007, she was selected to join Kalafina in an audition held by Sony Music Japan, and debuted on their second single "Sprinter" in 2008. During her ten years there, Kalafina released five studio albums and two compilation albums, all of which have charted in the Oricon top 10. Her Kalafina profile describes her voice range as the mid-to-high register, a wide range that is "powerful, stylish, and sharp". Following the resignation of music composer Yuki Kajiura from Space Craft, Hikaru would later leave the label on October 20, 2018, after her contract expired.

In November 2019, she launched her solo project under the name H-el-ical//, pronounced "he-ri-ka-ru" (ヘリカル). In April 2020, she released her first single "Altern-ate-" under NBCUniversal Entertainment Japan. It was used as the theme song for the anime television series Gleipnir. and reached No. 9 on the Oricon charts. She has written and released some concept music on her self-titled mini-album and another mini-album called elements, releasing videos on YouTube. In November, she released her second single "disclose", which was the ending theme for the anime television series Magatsu Wahrheit -Zuerst-. In November 2021, she released her third single "The Sacred Torch", which was used as the opening theme for the anime television series The Faraway Paladin. On the same month, she released her fourth indie album Story. In January 2022, she released her fourth single "JUST DO IT", which was used as the opening theme for the anime television series World's End Harem. The single was originally scheduled to release in November 2021, but it was postponed until January 2022.

In April 2022, she announced her first major studio album Kaihouku. Her past four singles were included. The album was released on June 29, 2022.

== Discography ==
=== Singles ===
==== As lead artist ====
List of singles, with selected chart positions
Title	Year	Oricon		Album
Title	Year	Peak position	Weeks charted	Album
"Altern-ate"	2020	9	4	Kaihouku
"disclose"	2020	24	1	Kaihouku
"The Sacred Torch"	2021	41	3	Kaihouku
"JUST DO IT"	2022	35	2	Kaihouku

==== As a collaborating artist ====
List of guest appearances, with selected chart positions
Title	Year	Oricon		Album
Title	Year	Peak position	Weeks charted	Album
"[Re]Rise Short" (Feryquitous feat. H-el-ical//); Theme song of the mobile game DUEL MASTERS PLAY'S	2020	–	–	Non-album single

==== Studio albums ====
Title	Album details	Peak	Sales (JPN)
Title	Album details	JPN	Sales (JPN)
Kaihouku	Released: June 29, 2022; Label: NBCUniversal Entertainment Japan; Formats: CD, Blu-ray, download, streaming	47	931

=== Studio concept albums ===
Title	Album details
H-el-ical//	Released: December 1, 2019; Label: Hifumi; Format: CD, limited release
elements	Released: April 5, 2020; Label: Hifumi; Format: CD, limited release
Blooming	Released: December 29, 2020; Label: Hifumi; Format: CD, limited release
Story	Released: November 7, 2021; Label: Hifumi; Format: CD, limited release

== Music videos ==
=== Concept videos ===
List of music videos, showing year released, director(s) and album
Title	Year	Director(s)	Album	Link
"pulsation"	2019	Kaito Sasaki	H-el-ical//	
"Avaricia"	2019	Yoshihisa Bamba	H-el-ical//	
"Splendore"	2019	Kaito Sasaki	H-el-ical//	
"Amanhecer"	2019	Yoshihisa Bamba	H-el-ical//	
"yolcu"	2019	Kaito Sasaki	H-el-ical//	
"紡 - TSUMUGU -"	2019	Kaito Sasaki	H-el-ical//	
"Mizu - Find your answer" (水 - Find your answer)	2020	Yoshihisa Bamba	elements	
"Kaze - Struggle to admit" (風 - Struggle to admit)	2020	Yoshihisa Bamba	elements	
"Tsuchi - Side by side" (地 - Side by side)	2020	Yoshihisa Bamba	elements	
"Spiranthes"	2020	Yoshihisa Bamba	Blooming	
"Shion" (シオン)	2020	Yoshihisa Bamba	Blooming	
"Kalanchoe"	2020	Yoshihisa Bamba	Blooming	
"Saki -SHOW-" (咲 -SHOW-)	2020	Kaito Sasaki	Blooming	
"I am me"	2021	Minamo	Story	
"midnight"	2021	Minamo	Story	
"Angel"	2021	Minamo	Story	
"Sei -SAY-" (生 -SAY-)	2021	Minamo	Story	
