= Oblivious (Kalafina song) =

Single by Kalafina

from the album Seventh Heaven
- B-side: "Kimi ga Hikari ni Kaete Iku, Kizuato"
- Released: (Japan) January 23, 2008
- Genre: J-Pop; Electro-industrial
- Label: SME Records
- Songwriter(s): Yuki Kajiura

Kalafina singles chronology
| "Oblivious" (2008) | "Sprinter/ARIA" (2008) |

"Oblivious" is the first single by the Japanese girl group Kalafina, with the two original members Wakana Ootaki and Keiko Kubota. All three tracks are used as theme songs in the first three Kara no Kyoukai movies.

== Track listing ==
Catalog number: SECL-586

1. oblivious
2. Kimi ga Hikari ni Kaete Iku (君が光に変えて行く, You Turn It Into Light)
3. Kizuato (傷跡, Scar)

== Charts ==
| Chart | Peak position | Sales |
|---|---|---|
| Oricon Weekly Singles | 8 | 38,695 |
