= Sprinter/Aria =

"sprinter/ARIA"

Single by Kalafina

from the album Seventh Heaven
- B-side: "Oblivious -instrumental-"
- Released: (Japan) July 30, 2008
- Genre: J-pop; symphonic rock
- Label: Sony Music Japan

Kalafina singles chronology
"Oblivious" (2008)	"sprinter/ARIA" (2008)	"Fairytale" (2008)

"sprinter/ARIA" is the second single by Kalafina, featuring Wakana Ootaki and Keiko Kubota, along with two new members, Maya Toyoshima and Hikaru Masai. "ARIA" was used as theme song for the fourth chapter of Kara no Kyoukai while "sprinter" was used for the fifth chapter.

== Track listings ==
=== CD ===
All tracks are written by Yuki Kajiura.

CD (SECL-671)
No.	Title	Length
1.	"sprinter"	5:02
2.	"ARIA"	5:22
3.	"Oblivious ~instrumental~"	4:22
Total length:		14:46

=== DVD ===
DVD (SECL-669~70)
No.	Title	Length
1.	"sprinter" (PV)
2.	"Oblivious ~ufotable edit~" (PV)

== Charts ==
Chart	Peak position	Sales
Oricon Weekly Singles	10	23,309
