= Yuki Kajiura =

Japanese composer (born 1965)

Yuki Kajiura 梶浦 由記
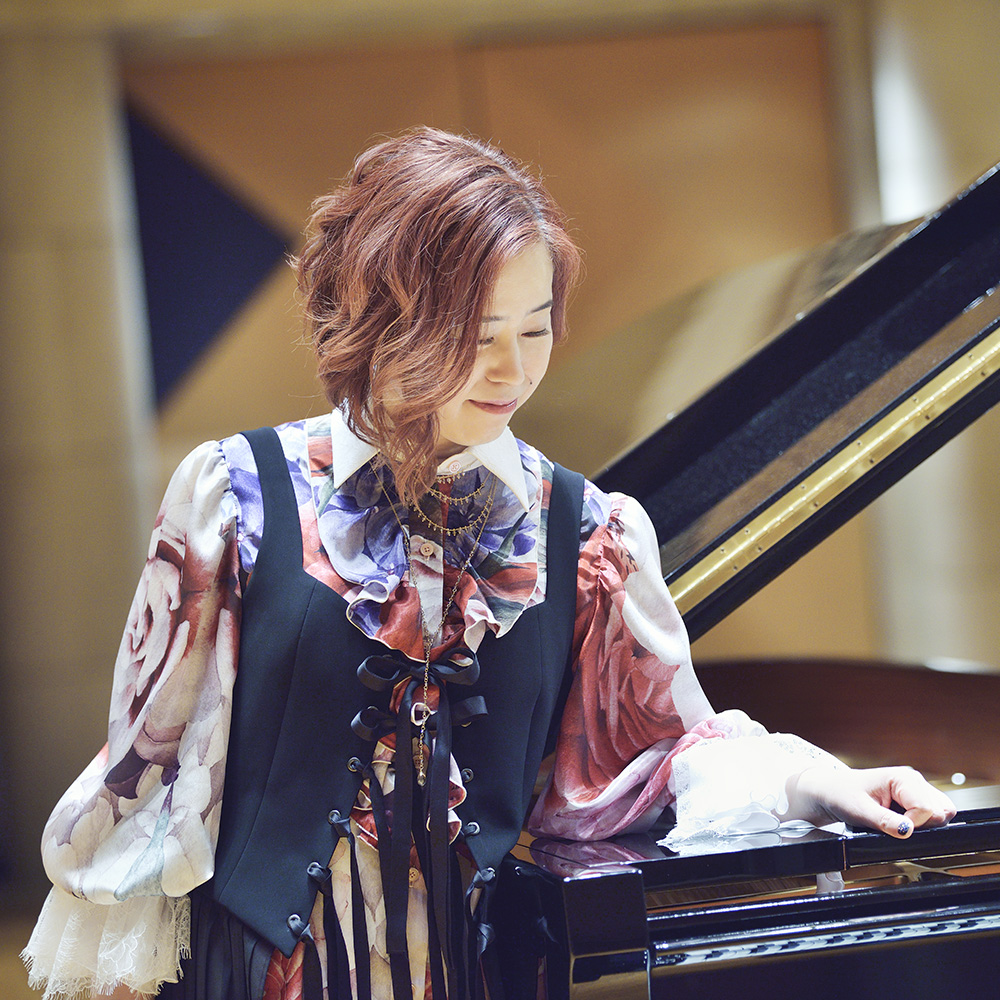
- Kajiura at Anime Expo 2018

Background information
- Born: August 6, 1965 (age 61)
- Origin: Tokyo, Japan
- Occupations: Composer; arranger; music producer
- Instruments: Piano; keyboard
- Years active: 1992–present
- Labels: Space Craft Produce (1993–2018); FictionJunction Music (2018–present)
- Member of: See-Saw; FictionJunction
- Website: www.fictionjunction.com

Yuki Kajiura (梶浦 由記, Kajiura Yuki; born August 6, 1965) is a Japanese composer, arranger and music producer. She has provided the music for several popular anime series, such as Sword Art Online, Puella Magi Madoka Magica, Fate/Zero, The Garden of Sinners, Pandora Hearts, and Demon Slayer: Kimetsu no Yaiba.

As a composer, Kajiura is known for her musical motifs and leitmotifs, as well as for her fusion of contemporary classical music and electronic music.

== Biography ==
Kajiura was born on August 6, 1965, in Tokyo, Japan. She has been into music since 1972, accompanying her father on the piano. Her family later moved to West Germany because of her father's work. Kajiura wrote her first composition when she was seven years old titled "Thank you, Good-bye" as a farewell for her grandmother before leaving Japan.

Kajiura moved back to Japan when she was in middle school and later graduated from college. She worked as a systems engineering programmer until 1992, when she decided to focus more on music. In 1993, she joined the group See-Saw with Chiaki Ishikawa.

In 2002, See-Saw created music for the anime .hack//Sign. During the production of the series, Kajiura met Emily Bindiger; impressed by her vocals, Kajiura offered her to perform over 10 of the series' songs. She jokingly called Bindiger "her English teacher" at Anime Expo 2003.

In 2003, Kajiura signed with FlyingDog to form FictionJunction Yuuka with Yūka Nanri. In 2004, the duo produced the opening and ending songs for Madlax. The next year, they published their first collaborative album, Destination.

In 2008, Kajiura signed with SME Records to form Kalafina. The group consists of Wakana Ootaki, Keiko Kubota, and Hikaru Masai.

In 2009, Kajiura started a new project called FictionJunction. Unlike FictionJunction Yuuka, vocalists in this project are not fixed. The project involves collaboration with artists such as Aira Yūki, Kaori Oda, and the members of Kalafina.

In October 2007, it was announced that Yuki Kajiura would be attending the performances of the Eminence Orchestra's concert, 'A Night in Fantasia 2007 – Symphonic Anime Edition', as a special guest.

The 2014 series Aldnoah.Zero's opening theme "Heavenly Blue" was composed by Kajiura and performed by Kalafina.

In July 2016, Aniplex of America announced that the "Yuki Kajiura LIVE ~featuring SWORD ART ONLINE~" concert that took place in March 2016 in Japan would be having an additional date on January 14, 2017, at the Dolby Theatre in Los Angeles, but it was later canceled due to visa issues.

In December 2017, a source reported to a news site, Sponchi Annex, that Kajiura was planning to leave her agency, Spacecraft Produce, over contract disputes. In February 2018, Kajiura confirmed via Twitter that she left her agency.

Kajiura has performed internationally at various anime conventions, including Anime Expo 2003, Anime Boston 2009 (with Kalafina), Anime Expo 2012 (with FictionJunction), and Anime Expo 2018 (as part of Anisong World Matsuri).

Kajiura is now represented by FictionJunction Music, a talent agency she founded herself.

== Discography ==
=== Solo albums ===
Year	Title
2003	Fiction
2011	Fiction II

=== Compilation albums ===
Year	Title
2011	The Works for Soundtrack
2023	The Works for Soundtrack 2

=== As project member ===
Year	Title	Artist	Notes
1993	I Have a Dream	See-Saw	Studio
1994	See-Saw	See-Saw	Studio
1995	Mata Aeru Kara	See-Saw	Single
2003	Early Best	See-Saw	Greatest Hits
2003	Dream Field	See-Saw	Studio
2005	Kimi wa Boku ni Niteiru	See-Saw	Single
2020	See-Saw Complete Best	See-Saw	Greatest Hits
2004	Destination	FictionJunction Yuuka	Studio
2005	Everlasting Song	FictionJunction Asuka	Single
2007	Circus	FictionJunction Yuuka	Studio
2008	Dream Port	Revo & Yuki Kajiura	CD & DVD
2008	Yuki Kajiura Live 2008.07.31	FictionJunction	Live DVD
2009	Everlasting Songs	FictionJunction	Studio
2009	Yuki Kajiura Live Vol.#4 Part I ~ Everlasting Songs Tour 2009	FictionJunction Yuuka	Live DVD
2009	Yuki Kajiura Live Vol.#4 PART II ~ Everlasting Songs Tour 2009	FictionJunction	Live DVD
2010	FictionJunction 2008–2010 The Best of Yuki Kajiura Live	FictionJunction	Live
2010	Animelo Summer Live 2009 RE:BRIDGE 8.23	FictionJunction/FictionJunction Yuuka	Live DVD
2012	Mobile Suite Gundam SEED Remastered Soundtrack Re track "Anna ni Issho Datta no ni"	Yuki Kajiura/See-Saw	Single
2012	Mobile Suite Gundam SEED Remastered Soundtrack Re track "Akatsuki no Kuruma"	Yuki Kajiura/FictionJunction Yuuka	Single
2012	Sing a Song/Silent Moon	FictionJunction	Limited Single
2013	Mobile Suite Gundam SEED Remastered Soundtrack Re track "Quiet Night"	Yuki Kajiura/Rie Tanaka	Single
2013	Mobile Suite Gundam SEED Destiny Remastered Soundtrack Re Mix "Tears"/"Kimi ha Boku ni Niteiru"/"Life Goes On"	Yuki Kajiura/Lisa Komine/See-Saw/Mika Arisaka	Single
2013	Yuki Kajiura Live Vol.#4 Part 1&2 Everlasting Songs Tour 2009	FictionJunction/FictionJunction Yuuka	Live Blu-Ray
2013	Yuki Kajiura ive Vol.#9 "Shibukou Special"	FictionJunction	Live DVD
2014	Elemental	FictionJunction	Studio
2014	Yuki Kajiura Live Vol.#11 FictionJunction Yuuka 2Days Special	FictionJunction Yuuka	Live Blu-Ray
2014	Yuki Kajiura Live Vol.#11 Elemental Tour 2014.4.20 @ NHK Hall + Making of Elemental Tour 2014	FictionJunction	Live Blu-Ray
2015	FictionJunction 2010–2013 The Best of Yuki Kajiura Live 2	FictionJunction	Live
2020	Yuki Kajiura Live Tour Vol.#15 "Soundtrack Special at the Amphitheater"	Yuki Kajiura/FictionJunction	Live
2020	Princess Principal The Live Yuki Kajiura×Void_Chords	Yuki Kajiura×Void_Chords	Live CD/Live Blu-Ray
2023	Parade	FictionJunction	Studio

=== Produced albums ===
Year	Title	Artist	Notes
2003	Melody	Saeko Chiba	Studio
2004	Everything	Saeko Chiba	Studio
2008	Re/oblivious	Kalafina	EP
2009	Seventh Heaven	Kalafina	Studio
2010	Red Moon	Kalafina	Studio
2011	After Eden	Kalafina	Studio
2013	Consolation	Kalafina	Studio
2013	Kalafina 5th Anniversary Live Selection 2009–2012	Kalafina	Live
2014	The Best "Blue"	Kalafina	Greatest Hits
2014	The Best "Red"	Kalafina	Greatest Hits
2015	Far on the Water	Kalafina	Studio
2016	Kalafina 8th Anniversary Special products The Live Album "Kalafina Live Tour 2014" at Tokyo International Forum Hall A	Kalafina	Live
2016	Winter Acoustic "Kalafina with Strings"	Kalafina	Studio, Christmas music
2018	Kalafina All Time Best 2008–2018	Kalafina	Greatest Hits

=== Other involvements ===
Genre	Project	Involvement	Year
Anime	Jura Tripper	Ending theme "Sunday Island" by Mariko Kouda	1995
Anime	Mobile Suit Gundam Seed	Closing theme & insert songs	2002
Anime	Chrono Crusade	Closing theme song (Sayonara Solitaire)	2003
Game	.hack//Quarantine	Song "Yasashii Yoake" (also used in .hack//Sign)	2003
Anime	The World of Narue	Closing theme	2003
Anime	Mobile Suit Gundam Seed Destiny	Closing theme & insert songs	2004
Anime	.hack//Legend of the Twilight	Closing theme	2004
Anime	Loveless	Theme song	2005
Anime	Shōnen Onmyōji	Opening theme song	2006
Anime	.hack//Roots	Opening theme song	2006
Anime	Bakumatsu Kikansetsu Irohanihoheto	Opening theme song	2006
Anime	My-Otome Zwei	Ending theme songs 2–3	2007
Anime	Baccano!	Ending Theme song "Calling" featuring Kaori Oda	2007
Anime	Amatsuki	Ending Theme song	2008
TV drama	Negima (Live Action)	Ending Theme song	2008
Anime	Kuroshitsuji	Ending Theme Song "Lacrimosa" by Kalafina	2008
Documentary	Unknown Episodes of History – Historia	Soundtrack	2009
Anime	So Ra No Wo To	Opening Theme song	2010
Anime	Ōkami Kakushi	Theme song	2010
Anime	Eve no Jikan	Ending Theme Song	2010
Game	Nobunaga's Ambition	Theme song	2010
Anime	Kuroshitsuji II	Insert theme song	2010
Game	.hack//Link	Previously written songs contributed: Edge, (from .hack//Liminality Volume 1: In the Case of Mai Minase) Obsession from .hack//Sign and Silly-Go-Round. (from .hack//Roots)	2010
Documentary	Unknown Episodes of History – Historia 2	Soundtrack	2011
Anime	Sacred Seven	Opening theme song	2011
Game	Senritsu no Stratus	Opening theme song	2011
Anime	Fate/Zero	Opening theme song, Ending theme song	2011
Anime	Aldnoah.Zero	Opening theme song	2014
Anime	Fate/stay night: Unlimited Blade Works	Guest Composer, Ending theme song	2014
Anime	The Heroic Legend of Arslan	Ending theme song	2015
Anime	Erased	Ending theme song	2016
Anime	The Heroic Legend of Arslan: Dust Storm Dance	Ending theme song	2016
Anime	Fate/stay night: Heaven's Feel I. presage flower	Theme song	2017
Anime	Fate/stay night: Heaven's Feel II. lost butterfly	Theme song	2019
Music	JAM Project song "To the Next Era"	Composition and arrangement	2020
Anime	Deemo: Memorial Keys	Theme song composition, arrangement and lyrics	2022

== Works ==
=== Anime ===
Title	Year	Director
Kimagure Orange Road: Summer's Beginning	1996	Osamu Kobayashi
Eat-Man	1997	Kōichi Mashimo
Noir	2001	Kōichi Mashimo
Aquarian Age	2002	Yoshimitsu Ohashi
.hack//Sign	2002	Kōichi Mashimo
.hack//Liminality	2002	Kōichi Mashimo
Le Portrait de Petit Cossette	2004	Akiyuki Shinbo
Madlax	2004	Kōichi Mashimo
My-HiME	2004	Masakazu Obara
My-Otome	2005	Masakazu Obara
Tsubasa: Reservoir Chronicle	2005–2006	Kōichi Mashimo; Hiroshi Morioka
Elemental Gelade	2005	Shigeru Ueda
My-Otome Zwei	2006	Masakazu Obara
Fist of the North Star: The Legends of the True Savior	2007	Toyoo Ashida
El Cazador de la Bruja	2007	Kōichi Mashimo
Tsubasa Tokyo Revelations	2007–2008	Shunsuke Tada
Tsubasa Shunraiki	2009	Shunsuke Tada
Pandora Hearts	2009	Takao Kato
Puella Magi Madoka Magica	2011	Akiyuki Shinbo; Yukihiro Miyamoto
Fate/Zero	2011–2012	Ei Aoki
Sword Art Online	2012	Tomohiko Itō
Sword Art Online II	2014	Tomohiko Itō
Erased	2016	Tomohiko Itō
Zaregoto	2016–2017	Akiyuki Shinbo; Yuki Yase
Princess Principal	2017	Masaki Tachibana
Sword Art Online: Alicization	2018–2020	Manabu Ono
Demon Slayer: Kimetsu no Yaiba	2019	Haruo Sotozaki
The Case Files of Lord El-Melloi II: Rail Zeppelin Grace Note	2019	Makoto Katō
The Case Study of Vanitas	2021	Tomoyuki Itamura
Fena: Pirate Princess	2021	Kazuto Nakazawa
Demon Slayer: Kimetsu no Yaiba – Mugen Train Arc	2021	Haruo Sotozaki
Demon Slayer: Kimetsu no Yaiba – Entertainment District Arc	2021	Haruo Sotozaki
Demon Slayer: Kimetsu no Yaiba – Swordsmith Village Arc	2023	Haruo Sotozaki
Demon Slayer: Kimetsu no Yaiba – Hashira Training Arc	2024	Haruo Sotozaki
Magic Knight Rayearth	2026	Yui Miura

=== Anime films ===
Title	Year	Director
Tsubasa Reservoir Chronicle Movie: Princess in Birdcage Kingdom	2005	Itsuro Kawasaki
The Garden of Sinners	2007–2009, 2013	Ei Aoki; Takuya Nonaka; Mitsuru Oburai; Tomonori Sudō
Puella Magi Madoka Magica the Movie Part I: Beginnings	2012	Akiyuki Shinbo; Yukihiro Miyamoto
Puella Magi Madoka Magica the Movie Part II: Eternal	2012	Akiyuki Shinbo; Yukihiro Miyamoto
Puella Magi Madoka Magica the Movie Part III: Rebellion	2013	Akiyuki Shinbo; Yukihiro Miyamoto
Sword Art Online: Extra Edition	2013	Tomohiko Itō
L.O.R.D: Legend of Ravaging Dynasties	2016	Guo Jingming
Sword Art Online The Movie: Ordinal Scale	2017	Tomohiko Itō
Fate/stay night: Heaven's Feel I. presage flower	2017	Tomonori Sudō
Fate/stay night: Heaven's Feel II. lost butterfly	2019	Tomonori Sudō
Fate/stay night: Heaven's Feel III. spring song	2020	Tomonori Sudō
Demon Slayer: Kimetsu no Yaiba the Movie: Mugen Train	2020	Haruo Sotozaki
Princess Principal: Crown Handler	2021	Masaki Tachibana
Sword Art Online Progressive: Aria of a Starless Night	2021	Ayako Kōno
Sword Art Online Progressive: Scherzo of Deep Night	2022	Ayako Kōno
Demon Slayer: Kimetsu no Yaiba – The Movie: Infinity Castle	2025	Haruo Sotozaki
Puella Magi Madoka Magica the Movie: Walpurgisnacht: Rising	2026	Akiyuki Shinbo; Yukihiro Miyamoto
Eisen Flügel	TBA	Seiji Mizushima; Daizen Komatsuda

=== Video games ===
Title	Platform	Year	Company
Double Cast	PlayStation	1998	Sony Computer Entertainment
Meguri-aishite	PlayStation	1999	SME
Blood: The Last Vampire	PlayStation 2	2000	Sony Computer Entertainment
Xenosaga Episode II: Jenseits von Gut und Böse (movie scenes)	PlayStation 2	2004	Namco
Xenosaga Episode III: Also sprach Zarathustra	PlayStation 2	2006	Namco

=== Television dramas ===
Title	Year
15 Sai no Shiganhei	2010
Hanako to Anne	2014
Eien no Nispa	2019
Anti-Hero	2024

=== Live-action films ===
Title	Year	Director
Tokyo-Kyodai	1995	Jun Ichikawa
Ruby Fruit	1995	Takumi Kimiduka
Rainbow	1999	Naoto Kumazawa
Boogiepop and Others	2000	Ryu Kaneda
Moon	2000	Takumi Kimiduka
Achilles and the Tortoise	2008	Takeshi Kitano

=== Musicals ===
Title	Year
Sakura-Wars	1998
Fine	1998
Funk-a-Step	1998
Funk-a-Step II	1999
Christmas Juliette	1999–2000
High-School Revolution	2000
Christmas Juliette	2000
Shooting-Star Lullaby	2001
Love's Labour's Lost/Set	2002
Angel Gate	2006
