= Kalafina =

Japanese musical group

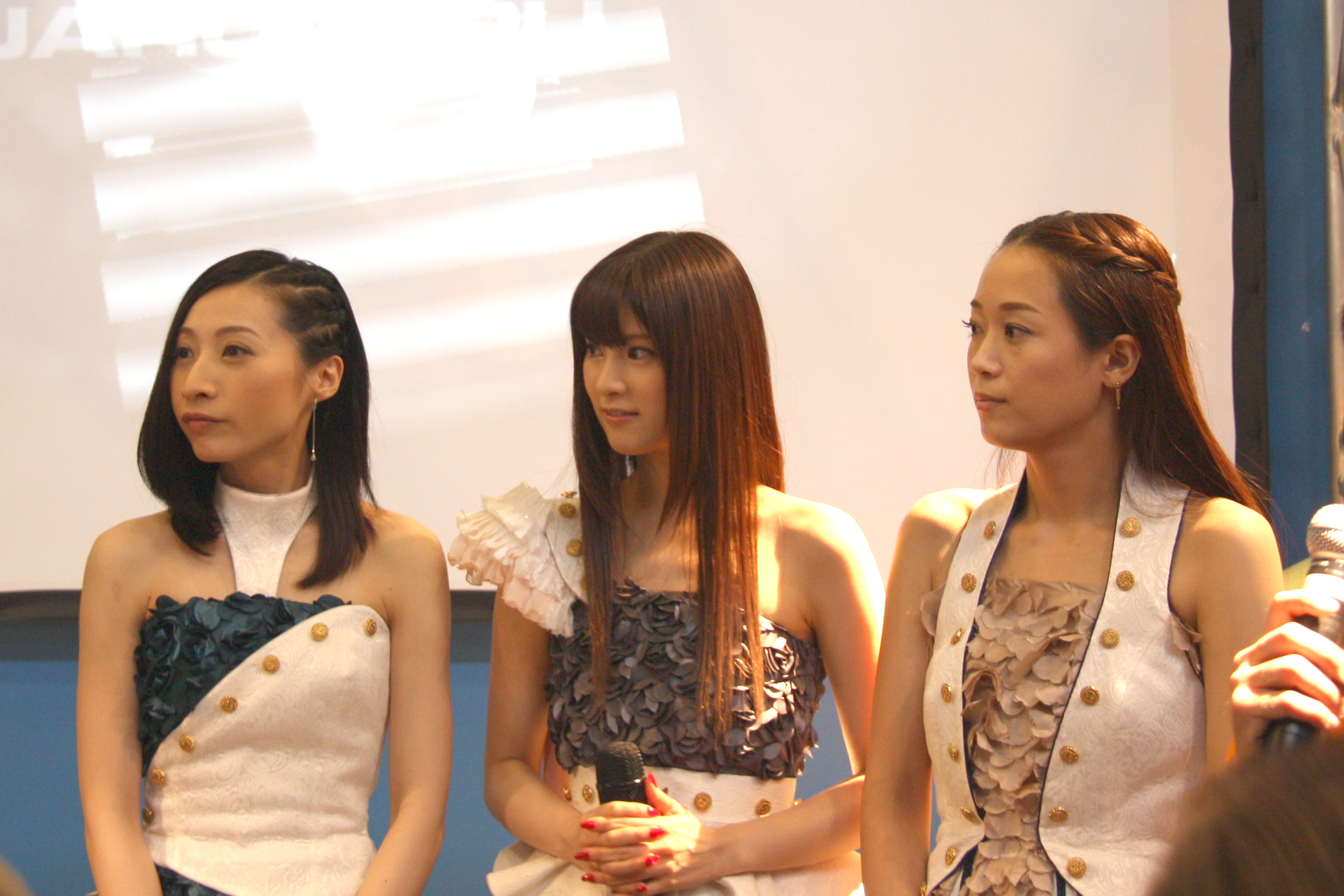
- The three vocalists of Kalafina at Japan Expo 2014. From Left: Hikaru, Keiko, Wakana.

Background information
- Origin: Tokyo, Japan
- Genres: Anison; Baroque pop; Operatic Pop; Electro-industrial; Techno; Symphonic Rock; Gothic Metal
- Years active: 2007–2019, 2024–present
- Labels: SME (2008–2017); Space Craft Produce; Sacra Music (2017–2019)
- Members: Keiko; Wakana; Hikaru
- Past members: Maya
- Website: www.kalafina.jp

Kalafina (カラフィナ) is a Japanese vocal group formed by composer Yuki Kajiura in 2007, mainly to perform theme songs for the anime The Garden of Sinners, but later expanded to include many other theme songs for other anime shows and films including the Puella Magi Madoka Magica, Black Butler, The Heroic Legend of Arslan and Fate franchises. They released five albums that have charted in the top 10 for Oricon. Kalafina disbanded in 2019, but regrouped on October 3, 2024.

== History ==
The group first appeared in January 2008 with two original members from Yuki Kajiura's FictionJunction project, Wakana Ōtaki and Keiko Kubota, whose membership was not confirmed until the first Dream Port 2008 concert held on April 29, 2008. In May 2008, it was announced that two more vocalists, Maya Toyoshima and Hikaru Masai, would be added to the project. Kalafina moved to the Sacra Music record label under Sony Music Entertainment Japan in April 2017. In 2009, Toyoshima left the group, resulting in a trio. In an interview with the group at Anime Central, the concept of Kalafina differs from FictionJunction in that Kajiura does not perform on stage with the singers, but serves as an off-stage producer and songwriter.

With Yuki Kajiura leaving her agency Space Craft Produce in 2018, news agency Oricon reported that the group was expected to continue even with Kajiura leaving. Space Craft has further announced that concerts and 10th anniversary film's plans would still move forward. Despite the group being expected to disband in spring, Space Craft reported to the official fan club that only one member will leave Kalafina. Although rumors said that Hikaru would leave the group, Sports Hochi reported that the member that would leave the group was Keiko, and that official news about who was leaving the group would be announced at the end of March 2018. It was confirmed on April 13, 2018, on Kalafina Lineblog that Keiko had officially left the group as of April 1, 2018. Following this, Hikaru left the agency as of October 20, 2018, although she did not state that she left the group. Finally, on March 13, 2019, Space Craft announced Kalafina's break up.

On October 3, 2024, Keiko, Wakana, and Hikaru announced that they have reunited due to fan support, with a concert planned for their anniversary on January 15, 2025, in Tokyo Garden Theater with Satoshi Takebe as their music producer. On the same day when the reunion was announced, Yuki Kajiura revealed that she had not been informed beforehand and wrote, "I think that from now on, everyone in Kalafina has decided to leave me as their producer and to walk their own path as a new Kalafina without my knowledge."

Studio Ghibli's sound track album on sale on February 25, 2026, includes Arrietty's Song (from Arrietty) performed by Kalafina.

== Members ==
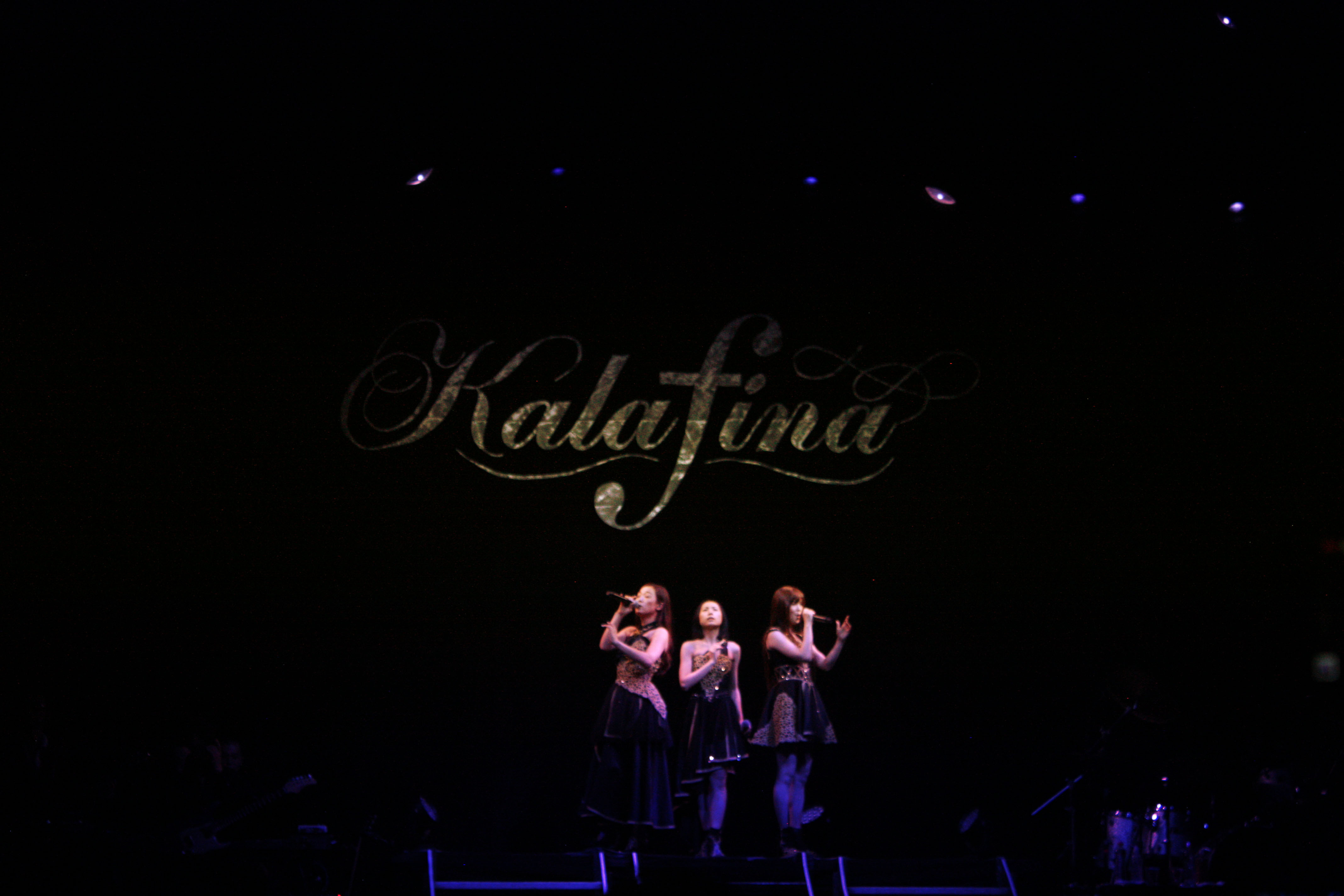
Kalafina performing in Mexico

=== Main vocalists ===
- Keiko (ケイコ; born December 5, 1985): She is a member of Kajiura's FictionJunction project and worked alongside her under the name FictionJunction KEIKO. She officially left the group in April 2018. She hails from the Shibuya area in Tokyo, Japan. Prior to FictionJunction and Kalafina, she was in a rock vocal duo called Itokubo. Space Craft describes her singing as a "captivating bass voice". In 2020, she is working on a solo album with Avex Trax.
- Wakana (ワカナ; born December 10, 1984): She is also a member of FictionJunction and previously collaborated with Yuki Kajiura as FictionJunction WAKANA. She moved from Space Craft to Victor Entertainment in 2019, and has released two solo albums and an EP.
- Maya Toyoshima (豊島摩耶 Toyoshima Maya): She was selected in an audition held by Sony Music Japan. She sang on the single "Sprinter/Aria". She left the group in 2009.
- Hikaru (ヒカル; born July 2, 1987): She was selected along with Maya in an audition held by Sony Music Japan. She officially left Space Craft on October 20, 2018, after her contract expired. She is from Toyama Prefecture. In 2020, she is pursuing a solo career under the name H-el-ical//.

=== Supporting ===
- Yuki Kajiura: The primary composer and arranger of Kalafina's songs. Kajiura left the group upon her departure from Space Craft Produce.
- REMI (田中玲美 Tanaka Remi, born January 6, 1977): Background vocalist.
- Yuriko Kaida (貝田由里子 Kaida Yuriko, born November 1): Background vocalist, she was part of FictionJunction's group of singers.
- Hanae Tomaru (戸丸華江, Tomaru Hanae): Background vocalist.

== Discography ==
=== Studio albums ===
- 2009: Seventh Heaven
- 2010: Red Moon
- 2011: After Eden
- 2013: Consolation
- 2015: Far on the Water

=== Other albums ===
- 2008: Re/oblivious (EP)
- 2013: Kalafina 5th Anniversary LIVE SELECTION 2009-2012 (live)
- 2014: The Best "Red" (compilation)
- 2014: The Best "Blue" (compilation)
- 2016: Kalafina 8th Anniversary Special products The Live Album「Kalafina LIVE TOUR 2014」at TOKYO INTERNATIONAL FORUM HALL A (live)
- 2016: Winter Acoustic "Kalafina with Strings" (acoustic)
- 2018: Kalafina All Time Best 2008–2018
