= Music of Mobile Suit Gundam SEED =

This article lists the albums attributed to the Mobile Suit Gundam SEED series.

== Soundtracks ==
=== Mobile Suit Gundam SEED Original Soundtrack I ===
Mobile Suit Gundam SEED Original Soundtrack I

Soundtrack album by Toshihiko Sahashi, See-Saw, Rie Tanaka
- Released: December 4, 2002 (Japan)
- Genre: Anime soundtrack
- Label: Victor Entertainment

Mobile Suit Gundam SEED Original Soundtrack I is the first soundtrack album of Mobile Suit Gundam SEED. Included in this album are the first ending theme "Anna ni Issho Datta no ni (TV Size)" by See-Saw, and "Shizuka na Yoru ni", the insert song in phase 07, 08, 09, 14 & 20 – performed by Rie Tanaka as Lacus Clyne.

Catalog number: VICL-61000

All music is composed by Toshihiko Sahashi except where noted. All music performed by Toshihiko Sahashi except where noted.

No.	Title	Lyrics	Artist	Length
1.	"Tobe! SEED" (翔べ! SEED Fly! SEED)
2.	"Anna ni Issho Datta no ni TV-Size" (あんなに一緒だったのに Although We Are Always Together TV-Size)		See-Saw
3.	"Gundam Shutsugeki" (Gundam出撃 Gundam Launching)
4.	"Tekichi e no Sennyū" (敵地への潜入 Sneaking Into Enemy Territory)
5.	"Kesshin" (決心 Determination)
6.	"Aseri" (焦り Impatience)
7.	"Asai Nemuri" (浅い眠り Shallow Sleep)
8.	"Kyūchi" (窮地 Dilemma)
9.	"Tekizen no Mayoi" (敵前の迷い Lost in the Presence of the Enemy)
10.	"Kanashimi" (哀しみ Sorrow)
11.	"Wazuka na Fuan" (微かな不安 Subtle Unrest)
12.	"Shingeki" (進撃 Charge)
13.	"Rakutan" (落胆 Disappointment)
14.	"Heiwa na Hoshi" (平和な星 Star of Peace)
15.	"ZAFT no Inbō" (ザフトの陰謀 ZAFT's Conspiracy)
16.	"Shatei Kyori" (射程距離 Firing Range)
17.	"Namida" (涙 Tears)
18.	"Sentō Taisei" (戦闘態勢 Fighting Mode)
19.	"Kyomu" (虚無 Emptiness)
20.	"Yokan" (予感 Premonition)
21.	"Teki no Iatsukan" (敵の威圧感 Intimidating the Enemy)
22.	"Shutsugeki Junbi" (出撃準備 Preparing to Sortie)
23.	"Kaisō" (回想 Reminiscence)
24.	"Sakareta Yūjō" (裂かれた友情 Broken Friendship)
25.	"Hisō" (悲愴 Sombre)
26.	"Hoshi e no Inori" (星への祈り Prayer to the Stars)
27.	"Eien e no Shunkan" (永遠への瞬間 Eternal Moment)
28.	"Archangel no Tabidachi" (アークエンジェルの旅立ち Archangel's Departure)
29.	"Shizuka na Yoru ni" (静かな夜に In the Quiet Night)	Yuki Kajiura	Lacus Clyne (Rie Tanaka)
30.	"Saikai no Yakusoku" (再開の約束 Promise of a Reunion)

=== Mobile Suit Gundam SEED Original Soundtrack II ===
Mobile Suit Gundam SEED Original Soundtrack II

Soundtrack album by Toshihiko Sahashi
- Released: April 23, 2003 (Japan)
- Genre: Anime soundtrack
- Label: Victor Entertainment

Mobile Suit Gundam SEED Original Soundtrack II is the second soundtrack album of Mobile Suit Gundam SEED.

Catalog number: VICL-61110

Track listing
1. Akatsuki no Kage (暁の影, Shadow of the Dawn); 2. Kūchū no Shisei (空中姿勢, Stance of the Air); 3. ZAFT no Shinkō (ザフトの侵攻, Zaft's Invasion); 4. Senpuku (潜伏, Ambush); 5. Seijaku no Kattō (静寂の葛藤, Conflict of Silence); 6. Bisoku Teitai (微速停滞, Slow Retention); 7. Shutsugeki e no Zenshin (出撃への前進, Advance towards Launching); 8. Tekiki Shūrai (敵機襲来, Raid on the Enemy Aircraft); 9. Kodō (鼓動, Beat); 10. Senjō no Ketsui (戦場の決意, Determination in the Battlefield); 11. Shinnyū (侵入, Penetration); 12. Kōgeki Taisei (攻撃態勢, Attack Mode); 13. Shinkū no Hadō (真空の波動, Waves of Vacuum); 14. Kanashimi no Hoshi (哀しみの星, Stars of Sadness); 15. Uragiri (裏切り, Betrayal); 16. Heiwa no Inori (平和の祈り, Prayers for Peace); 17. Jifubuki (地吹雪, Falling Snow); 18. Seisen no Gishin (聖戦の疑心, Suspicion of the Crusade); 19. Suna no Koe (砂の声, Voice of Sand); 20. Sajin no Machi (砂塵の街, City of Dust); 21. Haha Naru Umi (母なる海, Mother Sea); 22. Omoi (想い, Feelings); 23. Kodoku (孤独, Solitude); 24. Fushin (不信, Distrust); 25. Kira no Namida (キラの涙, Kira's Tears); 26. Sonzai e no Gimon (存在への疑問, Question of Existence); 27. Chijōsen (地上戦, Battle on the Ground); 28. Kawaki no Yume (渇きの夢, Dream of Thirst); 29. Kōgeki Kaishi (攻撃開始, Commencement of Attack); 30. Sentō Butai (戦闘部隊, Combat Troops); 31. STRIKE Shutsugeki (STRIKE出撃, STRIKE Launching); 32. Saikai no Yokan (再会の予感, Premonition of Reunion)

=== Mobile Suit Gundam SEED Original Soundtrack III ===
Mobile Suit Gundam SEED Original Soundtrack III

Soundtrack album by Toshihiko Sahashi, See-Saw, T.M.Revolution
- Released: September 21, 2003 (Japan)
- Genre: Anime soundtrack
- Label: Victor Entertainment

Mobile Suit Gundam SEED Original Soundtrack III is the third soundtrack album of Mobile Suit Gundam SEED. Included in this album are the first ending theme "Anna ni Issho Datta no ni" by See-Saw and the first opening theme "Invoke" by T.M.Revolution, both songs are in TV size edit.

Catalog number: VICL-61196

Track listing
1. Seigi to Jiyū (正義と自由, Justice and Freedom); 2. Yūkō Dageki (有効打撃, Valid Strike); 3. Sonzai no Ginen (存在の疑念, Suspicion of Existence); 4. Kōhō Shien (後方支援, Support from the Rear); 5. Gekichin Dominion (撃沈ドミニオン, Sinking Dominion); 6. Senkō no Hate ni (閃光の果てに, End of the Flash); 7. Countdown (カウントダウン); 8. Shūmatsu no Yogen (終末の預言, Prophecy of the End); 9. Flay no Shi (フレイの死, Flay's Death); 10. Sekibetsu no Shizuku (惜別の雫, A Drop of Farewell); 11. Keiryaku Chizu (計略地図, Map of the Plan); 12. Tettei Kōsen (徹底抗戦, Do-or-Die Resistance); 13. Shusshō no Hitsuyō (出生の秘要, Cost of Birth); 14. Idenshi no Keiji (遺伝子の啓示, Revelation of the Gene); 15. Yurameki no Shinjitsu (揺らめきの真実, Wavering Belief); 16. Freedom Jibaku (フリーダム自爆, Freedom Destruction) (Original: Anna ni Issho Datta no ni); 17. Yūjō no Bōeisen (友情の防衛戦, The War to Protect Friendship); 18. Shutsugeki Meirei (出撃命令, Order of Launching); 19. Yūjō no Keiyaku (友情の契約, Contract of Friendship); 20. Aku no San Heiki (悪の3兵器, Three Evil Weapons); 21. Kodoku no Senritsu (孤独の旋律, Melody of Solitude); 22. Itsuwari no Yūjō (偽りの友情, False Friendship); 23. Itsuka no Kisetsu (いつかの季節, Someday's Season); 24. Sakuryaku no Keizu (策略の系図, Genealogy of Schemes); 25. Rikusen no Hate ni (陸戦の果てに, At the end of the Battle on the Ground); 26. Shizukanaru Hanran (静かなる反乱, Rebellion of Quietness); 27. Mirai e no Chikai (未来への誓い, Oath of Future); 28. Tobe! Freedom (翔べ! フリーダム, Fly! Freedom); 29. Anna ni Issho Datta no ni (TV 1st ending edit) (あんなに一緒だったのに (TV 1st ending EDIT)) by See-Saw; 30. Invoke (TV opening version) (Invoke -インヴォーク- (TV opening version)) by T.M.Revolution

=== Mobile Suit Gundam SEED Original Soundtrack IV ===
Mobile Suit Gundam SEED Original Soundtrack IV

Soundtrack album by Toshihiko Sahashi, T.M.Revolution, See-Saw, Vivian or Kazuma, Nami Tamaki, Tatsuya Ishii, Mika Nakashima
- Released: December 16, 2004 (Japan)
- Genre: Anime soundtrack
- Label: Victor Entertainment

Mobile Suit Gundam SEED Original Soundtrack IV is the last soundtrack album of Mobile Suit Gundam SEED. Included in this album are all ending and opening themes of the series in TV size mix.

Catalog number: VICL-61500

Track listing
1. Invoke (TV opening version) (Invoke -インヴォーク- (TV opening version)) by T.M.Revolution; 2. Shizuka Naru Yoake (静かなる夜明け); 3. Tachiagare! Ikari yo (立ち上がれ! 怒りよ); 4. Senkai Senjutsu (旋回戦術); 5. Moment TV edit by Vivian or Kazuma; 6. Kira no Shukudai (キラの宿題); 7. Athrun no Yūutsu (アスランの憂鬱); 8. Jukū no Tobira (時空の扉); 9. Yureru Daichi no Hate (揺れる大地の果て); 10. Anna ni Issho Datta no ni (TV ending version) (あんなに一緒だったのに (TV ending version)) by See-Saw; 11. Sameru Kokoro (覚める心); 12. Ikinokori e no Sentaku (生き残りへの選択); 13. Saikisen (再起戦); 14. Believe (GUNDAM SEED Version) by Nami Tamaki; 15. Fushin to Namida to (不信と涙と); 16. Kanata, Furu Hoshi no Gotoku (彼方、降る星のごとく); 17. Akumu no Tsuzuki (悪夢の続き); 18. Eyecatch 1 (アイキャッチ1); 19. Eyecatch 2 (アイキャッチ2); 20. Yasashii Manazashi (優しい眼差し); 21. Tomo e no Omoi (友への想い); 22. Heiwa e no Negai (平和への願い); 23. Zetsubō no Fuchi (絶望の淵); 24. Kira no Kodoku (キラの孤独); 25. RIVER (GUNDAM SEED Version) by Tatsuya Ishii; 26. Majiwaranai Senritsu (交わらない旋律); 27. Hikari o Sagashite (光を探して); 28. Shinkū no Sadame (真空のさだめ); 29. Yoake no Kōkō (夜明けの航行); 30. Realize (GUNDAM SEED OPENING Ver.) by Nami Tamaki; 31. Sabaku no Kiba (砂漠の牙); 32. Saigishin (猜疑心); 33. Kotae o Sagashite (答えを探して); 34. Hoshi no Tsuzuku Michi (星の続く路); 35. FIND THE WAY (TV mix) by Mika Nakashima

=== Mobile Suit Gundam SEED Destiny Original Soundtrack I ===
Mobile Suit Gundam SEED Destiny Original Soundtrack I

Soundtrack album by Toshihiko Sahashi, Rie Tanaka
- Released: December 16, 2004 (Japan)
- Genre: Anime soundtrack
- Label: Victor Entertainment

Mobile Suit Gundam SEED Destiny Original Soundtrack I is the first soundtrack album of Mobile Suit Gundam SEED Destiny. Included in this album is "Fields of Hope", the insert song in phase 07, 09, 41, edited & final plus – performed by Rie Tanaka as Lacus Clyne.

Catalog number: VICL-61555

All music is composed by Toshihiko Sahashi except "Fields of Hope" by Yuki Kajiura. All music performed by Toshihiko Sahashi except "Fields of Hope" by Lacus Clyne (Rie Tanaka).

No.	Title	Lyrics	Length
1.	"Unmei no Tobira" (運命の扉, Door of Destiny)
2.	"Minerva Take Off"
3.	"Teisen no Hate ni..." (停戦の果てに・・・, In the end of the cease-fire...)
4.	"Core Splendor Lift Off"
5.	"Shizukesa no Toki" (静けさの刻, Instant of Peace)
6.	"Kantai Shutsugen" (艦隊出現, The fleets appear)
7.	"Sangeki no Daichi" (惨劇の大地, Ground of Tragedy)
8.	"Kotoba Nakushite" (言葉なくして, Without words)
9.	"Girty Lue Navigation"
10.	"Gaia x Chaos x Abyss"
11.	"Mission Kaishi" (ミッション開始, Mission Starts)
12.	"Yami no Tsuiseki" (闇の追跡, Tracking of Darkness)
13.	"Senka no 16sai" (戦火の16歳, 16 years of wars)
14.	"Mebaeta Ikari" (芽生えた怒り, Grew Angry)
15.	"Aratana Yami" (新たな闇, New Darkness)
16.	"Yōki to Hohoemi" (妖気と微笑み, Dark Aura and Smile)
17.	"Yuragu Ishiki no Naka de" (揺らぐ意識の中で, Inside the shaking will)
18.	"Nōryoku to Shi to" (能力と死と, Good or Death)
19.	"Athrun no Fuan" (アスランの不安, Athrun's worry)
20.	"Nikushimi Arebasoko" (憎しみあればこそ, Possible Hatred)
21.	"Nazo no Kiri" (謎の霧, Mysterious Mist)
22.	"Isshun no Senritsu" (一瞬の戦慄, Melody of Moment)
23.	"Colony – Semaru Inbō" (Colony ～迫る陰謀, Conspiracy gets close)
24.	"Colony – Zettai Zetsumei" (Colony ～絶体絶命, Certain Death)
25.	"Colony – Hiai Kōsaku" (Colony ～悲哀交錯, Mixture of Sorrow)
26.	"Yume Miru Shōjo ni..." (夢見る少女に・・・, Dream girl)
27.	"Fields of Hope"	Kajiura
28.	"Minerva Navigation"
29.	"ignited" (piano version)
30.	"Asu e no Hashi" (明日への橋, Bridge to Tomorrow)

=== Mobile Suit Gundam SEED Destiny Original Soundtrack II ===
Mobile Suit Gundam SEED Destiny Original Soundtrack II

Soundtrack album by Toshihiko Sahashi, Houko Kuwashima
- Released: April 21, 2005 (Japan)
- Genre: Anime soundtrack
- Label: Victor Entertainment

Mobile Suit Gundam SEED Destiny Original Soundtrack II is the second soundtrack album of Mobile Suit Gundam SEED Destiny. Included in this album is "Shinkai no Kodoku", the insert song used in phase 21, 26, 30, 32 & 33 – performed by Houko Kuwashima, Stellar Loussier's voice actress. In the remastered version of Gundam SEED Destiny, this song is used as the ending theme for phase 32.

Catalog number: VICL-61600

Track listing
1. Shutsugeki! Impulse (出撃! インパルス); 2. Hajimari ga Yue (始まりが故); 3. Kaisen Zen'ya (開戦前夜); 4. Misenai Kokoro (見せない心); 5. Senka no Kizuato (戦禍の傷痕); 6. Kantai Shiki (艦隊指揮); 7. Kakushitsu no Sukima (確執の隙間); 8. Kizutsuita Ashiato (傷ついた足跡); 9. Shikkoku no Kūkan (漆黒の空間); 10. Senkyō Henka (戦況変化); 11. Koerarenu Kabe (超えられぬ壁); 12. Nayami Kurushimi... (悩み苦しみ・・・); 13. Sakebi to Ikari no Muku hō e (叫びと怒りの向く方へ); 14. Kakusei Shinn Asuka (覚醒シン・アスカ); 15. Yūwaku (誘惑); 16. Backpack Kansō (バックパック換装); 17. Fuon na Kotoba (不穏な言葉); 18. Tōketsu no Iki (凍結の息); 19. Shizuka Naru Toki (静かなる刻); 20. Risō Yūdō (理想誘導); 21. Umi to Sora to Kaze to (海と空と風と); 22. Shinjireba Koso (信じればこそ); 23. Heiwa e no Inori (平和への祈り); 24. Mienai Kotae (見えない答え); 25. Shinkeisen (神経戦); 26. Senryaku Shinten Sezu (戦略進展せず); 27. Shinkai no Kodoku (深海の孤独; The Sea's Loneliness) by Houko Kuwashima

=== Mobile Suit Gundam SEED Destiny Original Soundtrack III ===
Mobile Suit Gundam SEED Destiny Original Soundtrack III

Soundtrack album by Toshihiko Sahashi
- Released: August 24, 2005 (Japan)
- Genre: Anime soundtrack
- Label: Victor Entertainment

Mobile Suit Gundam SEED Destiny Original Soundtrack III is the third soundtrack album of Mobile Suit Gundam SEED Destiny.

Catalog number: VICL-61610

Track listing
1. Aratanaru Chikara to Seigi (新たなる力と正義); 2. Kira, Sono Kokoro no Mama ni (キラ、その心のままに); 3. Akuma no Keiyaku (悪魔の契約); 4. Hi no Shizumu Toki (陽の沈む刻); 5. Senkan Kōsen (戦艦交戦); 6. Kiei Nashi... (機影なし・・・); 7. Dassō (脱走); 8. Kyōki no Hate (狂気の果て); 9. Bōsō (暴走); 10. Hakai to Zetsubō (破壊と絶望); 11. Shūnen no Ichigeki (執念の一撃); 12. Yaiba no Saki (刃の先); 13. Kyūsoku Senkō (急速潜行); 14. Yūki no Kakkū (勇気の滑空); 15. Shizuka Naru Ikari (静かなる怒り); 16. Fukushū Freedom Gekiha (復讐 ～フリーダム撃破); 17. Stellar no Kizu (ステラの傷); 18. Mae o muite (前を向いて); 19. Shinkai no Namida (深海の涙); 20. Eyecatch (アイキャッチ); 21. Jiken Yōsai (実験要塞); 22. Jūgeki Ame (銃撃雨); 23. Ansatsu Butai (暗殺部隊); 24. Kanashimi no Stellar (哀しみのステラ); 25. Nageki no Uta (嘆きの詩); 26. Wakare no Kioku (別れの記憶); 27. Kira Ai no Theme (キラ ～愛のテーマ); 28. Tabidachi no Asa (旅立ちの朝); 29. Fuwaku no Konrei (不惑の婚礼); 30. Kaze no Kodō (風の鼓動); 31. Kimi to Boku, Todokanu Omoi (君と僕、届かぬ想い); 32. Archangel Fujō (アークエンジェル浮上); 33. Saviour Shutsugeki (セイバー出撃); 34. Chichi no Kage (父の影); 35. Konran no Ato... (混乱の後・・・); 36. Saikai no Yūki (再会の勇気)

=== Mobile Suit Gundam SEED Destiny Original Soundtrack IV ===
Mobile Suit Gundam SEED Destiny Original Soundtrack IV

Soundtrack album by Toshihiko Sahashi
- Released: February 15, 2006 (Japan)
- Genre: Anime soundtrack
- Label: Victor Entertainment

Mobile Suit Gundam SEED Destiny Original Soundtrack IV is the last soundtrack album of Mobile Suit Gundam SEED Destiny.

Catalog number: VICL-61791

Track listing
1. Saigo no Seisen Ikari (最後の征戦 ～怒り); 2. Saigo no Seisen Kasumu Sora no Hate (最後の征戦 ～霞む空の果て); 3. Saigo no Seisen Ken no Saki, Fuan to Namida (最後の征戦 ～剣の先、不安と涙); 4. Sakebi to Gekitetsu (叫びと撃鉄); 5. Kira, Sono Mezame to Ketsui (キラ、その目覚めと決意); 6. Ōgantai Saigo no Tatakai (大艦隊最後の戦い); 7. Hikari to Kage (光と陰); 8. Kotoba no Oku ni... (言葉の奥に・・・); 9. Kuroi Hadō (黒い波動); 10. Kusen (苦戦); 11. Kokuchi (告知); 12. Fushigi na Deai (不思議な出会い); 13. Shūmatsu no Anji (終末の暗示); 14. Kanashiki Kako (哀しき過去); 15. Futatsu no Bokan Sōzetsu (二つの母艦 ～壮絶); 16. Futatsu no Bokan Shinnen (二つの母艦 ～信念); 17. Itsuwari no Ai (偽りの愛); 18. Shinrai (信頼); 19. Yuragu Shisen to Kako (揺らぐ視線と過去); 20. Shi o Utsusu Kagami no Jōdō (死を映す鏡の情動); 21. Hametsu o Shiranu Futari (破滅を知らぬ二人); 22. Nakushita Kioku (亡くした記憶); 23. Tachikirenu Ai (断ち切れぬ愛); 24. Omokage (面影); 25. Saikai to Ketsubetsu (再会と決別); 26. Shinnen no Michibiki (信念の導き); 27. Inbō (陰謀); 28. Atarashiki Sekai e Shōgeki (新しき世界へ ～衝撃); 29. Atarashiki Sekai e Seigi (新しき世界へ ～正義); 30. Atarashiki Sekai e Jiyū (新しき世界へ ～自由)

== Opening themes ==
=== "Invoke" ===
"Invoke"

Single by T.M.Revolution

from the album coordinate
- B-side: "Pied Piper"
- Released: October 30, 2002 (Japan)
- Genre: J-Pop
- Label: Epic Records Japan

"Invoke" is the 20th single released by T.M.Revolution. The song was used as the first opening theme for Mobile Suit Gundam SEED from phase 01 to 13.

Catalog number: ESCL-9090

Track listing

1. Invoke
2. Pied Piper
3. Invoke (phase shift armoured version)
4. Invoke (instrumental)

Charts

Chart	Peak position	Sales
Oricon Weekly Singles	#2	247,000

=== "Moment" ===
"Moment"

Single by Vivian or Kazuma
- B-side: "Darling Honey; Hoshi ni Negai wo"
- Released: January 29, 2003 (Japan)
- Genre: J-Pop
- Label: Sony Music Japan

"Moment" is a duet by Vivian Hsu and Kazuma Endō under the stage name Vivian or Kazuma. The song was used as the second opening theme for Mobile Suit Gundam SEED from phase 14 to 26.

All lyrics are written by Vivian or Kazuma.

CD (SECL-107)
No.	Title	Music	Length
1.	"Moment" (Gundam SEED second opening theme song)	Akio Dobashi
2.	"Darling Honey"	Akio Dobashi
3.	"Hoshi ni Negai wo (星に願いを, The Wish Upon the Stars)"	Kazuma; Akio Dobashi (arrangement)

Charts

Chart	Peak position	Sales
Oricon Weekly Singles	#5	121,488

=== "Moment" remixes ===
"Moment remixes"

Single by Vivian or Kazuma
- Released: July 7, 2004 (Japan)
- Genre: J-Pop
- Label: Sony Music Japan

"Moment" remixes" contains remixes and an instrumental version of the song "Moment" by Vivian or Kazuma.

Catalog number: SECL-108

Track listing

1. Moment (B4 ZA Beat remix)
2. Moment (Crude Reality remix)
3. Moment (Sawasaki Yosihiro! remix) (Moment (サワサキヨシヒロ! remix))
4. Moment (MAF remix)
5. Moment (instrumental)

=== "Believe" ===
"Believe"

Single by Nami Tamaki

from the album Greeting
- B-side: "Complete; Can you feel my love"
- Released: April 23, 2003 (Japan)
- Genre: J-Pop
- Label: Sony Music Records

"Believe" is the debut single of Nami Tamaki. The song was used as the third opening theme for Mobile Suit Gundam SEED from phase 27 to 40.

Catalog number: SRCL-6084

Track listing

1. Believe
2. Complete
3. Can you feel my love
4. Believe – instrumental

Charts

Chart	Peak position	Sales
Oricon Weekly Singles	#5	194,167

=== Believe Reproduction Gundam SEED edition ===
"Believe Reproduction Gundam SEED edition"

Single by Nami Tamaki
- B-side: "Final Memory"
- Released: May 21, 2003 (Japan)
- Genre: J-Pop
- Label: Sony Music Records

Believe Reproduction Gundam SEED edition contains remixes of the song "Believe" by Nami Tamaki.

Catalog number: SRCL-6085

Track listing

1. Believe – Evidence01 mix
2. Believe – Freedom G Control mix
3. Final Memory
4. Final Memory – happy hardcore mix

=== "Realize" ===
"Realize"

Single by Nami Tamaki

from the album Greeting
- B-side: "Hot summer day Ashita no Kimi"
- Released: July 24, 2003 (Japan)
- Genre: J-Pop
- Label: Sony Music Records

"Realize" is the second single released by Nami Tamaki. The song was used as the last opening theme for Mobile Suit Gundam SEED from phase 41 to 50.

Catalog number: SRCL-6088

Track listing

1. Realize
2. Hot summer day
3. Ashita no Kimi (明日の君, You of Tomorrow)
4. Realize – instrumental

Charts

Chart	Peak position	Sales
Oricon Weekly Singles	#3	157,190

=== Realize Reproduction Gundam SEED edition ===
"Realize Reproduction Gundam SEED edition"

Single by Nami Tamaki
- B-side: "Long Way Behind"
- Released: September 26, 2003 (Japan)
- Genre: J-Pop
- Label: Sony Music Records

Realize Reproduction Gundam SEED edition contains remixes and a TV opening mix of the song "Realize" by Nami Tamaki.

Catalog number: SRCL-6091

Track listing

1. Realize – KZ Strictly Uptempo mix
2. Realize – fly in to the Universe mix
3. Long Way Behind
4. Realize – Gundam SEED opening ver.

=== "Ignited" ===
"Ignited"

Single by T.M.Revolution

from the album Seventh Heaven
- B-side: "Mugen no Ark"
- Released: November 3, 2004 (Japan)
- Genre: J-Pop
- Label: Epic Records Japan

"Ignited" is the 23rd single released by T.M.Revolution. The song was used as the first opening theme for Mobile Suit Gundam SEED Destiny from phase 01 to 13.

Catalog number: ESCL-2598

Track listing

1. ignited (ignited -イグナイテッド-)
2. Mugen no Ark (夢幻の孤光, Ark of Illusion)

Charts

Chart	Peak position	Sales
Oricon Weekly Singles	#1	161,324

=== "Pride" ===
"Pride"

Single by High and Mighty Color

from the album G∞VER
- B-side: "Hikaru Kakera all alone"
- Released: January 26, 2005 (Japan)
- Genre: J-Pop
- Label: Sony Music Japan

"Pride" is the debut single of High and Mighty Color. The song was used as the second opening theme for Mobile Suit Gundam SEED Destiny from phase 14 to 24 & edited.

Catalog number: SECL-140

Track listing

1. Pride
2. Hikaru Kakera (光るカケラ, Fragments of Light)
3. all alone
4. Pride (instrumental)

Charts

Chart	Peak position	Sales
Oricon Weekly Singles	#2	223,208

=== "Pride" remix ===
""Pride" remix"

Single by High and Mighty Color
- Released: March 24, 2005 (Japan)
- Genre: J-Pop
- Label: Sony Music Japan

"Pride" remix contains remixes of the song "Pride" by High and Mighty Color.

Catalog number: SECL-157

Track listing

1. Pride Nu school of mixture mix
2. Pride R&B norishiromix
3. Pride HΛL's mix 2005
4. Pride D.D.INOReMIX
5. Pride Real Latin Players mix
6. Pride "Phantom pain" norishirobreakmegamix

Charts

Chart	Peak position	Sales
Oricon Weekly Singles	#20	18,527

=== "Bokutachi no Yukue" ===
"Bokutachi no Yukue"

Single by Hitomi Takahashi

from the album sympathy
- B-side: "Kaze no Kirin; Melody"
- Released: April 13, 2005 (Japan)
- Genre: J-Pop
- Label: Sony Music Records

"Bokutachi no Yukue" is the debut single of Hitomi Takahashi. The song was used as the third opening theme for Mobile Suit Gundam SEED Destiny from phase 25 to 37.

Catalog number: SRCL-5900

Track listing

1. Bokutachi no Yukue (僕たちの行方, Our Whereabouts)
2. Kaze no Kirin (風のキリン, Wind Giraffe)
3. Melody (メロディ)
4. Bokutachi no Yukue -instrumental-

Charts

Chart	Peak position	Sales
Oricon Weekly Singles	#1	135,898

=== "Wings of Words" ===
"Wings of Words"

Single by CHEMISTRY

from the album fo(u)r
- B-side: "Change The World"
- Released: July 27, 2005 (Japan)
- Genre: J-Pop
- Label: DefSTAR

"Wings of Words" is the 15th single of Chemistry, this single was released in two formats with different track lists. The song "Wings of Words" was used as the last opening theme for Mobile Suit Gundam SEED Destiny from phase 38 to 50.

Catalog numbers: DFCL-1211 (limited edition); DFCL-1212 (regular edition)

Limited edition track listing

1. Wings of Words
2. Washi o Shimin Kyūjō ni Tsuretette. (わしを市民球場に連れてって。)
3. Bugsy Night feat. DABO
4. Change The World

Regular edition track listing

1. Wings of Words
2. Change The World
3. Wings of Words (alas de palabras)
4. Wings of Words (instrumental)

Charts

Chart	Peak position	Sales
Oricon Weekly Singles	#2	140,969

== Ending themes ==
=== "Anna ni Issho Datta no ni" ===
"Anna ni Issho Datta no ni"

Single by See-Saw

from the album Dream Field
- B-side: "Tsuki Hitotsu"
- Released: October 23, 2002 (Japan)
- Genre: Anime
- Label: Victor Entertainment

"Anna ni Issho Datta no ni" is the 9th single released by See-Saw. The song was used as the first ending theme for Mobile Suit Gundam SEED, from phase 01 to 26.

Catalog number: VICL-35440

Track listing

1. Anna ni Issho Datta no ni (あんなに一緒だったのに, Although We Were Always Together)
2. Tsuki Hitotsu (月ひとつ, One Moon)
3. Anna ni Issho Datta no ni (karaoke)
4. Tsuki Hitotsu (karaoke)

Charts

Chart	Peak position	Sales
Oricon Weekly Singles	#5	173,894

=== "River" ===
"River / Mizuiro no Ame"

Single by Tatsuya Ishii

from the album nipops
- Released: March 26, 2003 (Japan)
- Genre: J-Pop
- Label: Sony Music Records

"River / Mizuiro no Ame" is the 12th single released by Tatsuya Ishii. The song "River" was used as the second ending theme for Mobile Suit Gundam SEED, from phase 27 to 39.

Catalog number: SRCL-6082

Track listing

1. River
2. Mizuiro no Ame (みずいろの雨, Water-Colored Rain)

Charts

Chart	Peak position	Sales
Oricon Weekly Singles	#40	14,445

=== "River" Gundam SEED edition ===
"River ~Gundam SEED edition~"

Single by Tatsuya Ishii
- Released: May 21, 2003 (Japan)
- Genre: J-Pop
- Label: Sony Music Records

"River" Gundam SEED edition contains remixes and an instrumental version of the song "River" by Tatsuya Ishii.

Catalog number: SRCL-6086

Track listing

1. River
2. River remix
3. River piano instrumental
4. River backtracks

Charts

Chart	Peak position	Sales
Oricon Weekly Singles	#22	29,502

=== "Find The Way" ===
"Find The Way"

Single by Mika Nakashima

from the album Love
- B-side: "Seppun (at-tica remix)"
- Released: August 6, 2003 (Japan)
- Genre: J-Pop
- Label: Sony Music Associated Records Inc.

"Find The Way" is the 9th single released by Mika Nakashima. The song was used as the last ending theme for Mobile Suit Gundam SEED, from phase 40 to 50.

Catalog number: AICL-1676

Track listing

1. Find The Way
2. Find The Way (instrumental)
3. Seppun (at-tica remix) (接吻, Kiss)
4. Find The Way (jamaals manatee mix by the orb)

Charts

Chart	Peak position	Sales
Oricon Weekly Singles	#4	124,489

=== "Reason" ===
"Reason"

Single by Nami Tamaki

from the album Make Progress
- B-side: "Promised Land; Truth"
- Released: February 1, 2004 (as download); November 10, 2004 (Japan; as single)
- Genre: J-Pop
- Label: Sony Music Records

"Reason" is the 6th single released by Nami Tamaki. The song was used as the first ending theme for Mobile Suit Gundam SEED Destiny, from phase 01 to 13.

Catalog number: SRCL-5826

Track listing

1. Reason
2. Promised Land
3. Truth
4. Reason -Instrumental-

Charts

Chart	Peak position	Sales
Oricon Weekly Singles	#2	178,580

=== "Life Goes On" ===
"Life Goes On"

Single by Mika Arisaka
- B-side: "Toki no Sabaku"
- Released: February 2, 2005 (Japan)
- Genre: Anime
- Label: Victor Entertainment

"Life Goes On" is the 11th single released by Mika Arisaka. The song was used as the second ending theme for Mobile Suit Gundam SEED Destiny, from phase 14 to 25 & edited.

Catalog number: VICL-35755

Track listing

1. Life Goes On
2. Toki no Sabaku (時の砂漠, Desert of Time)
3. Life Goes On (original karaoke)
4. Toki no Sabaku (original karaoke)

Charts

Chart	Peak position	Sales
Oricon Weekly Singles	#4	119,841

=== "I Wanna Go to a Place..." ===
"I Wanna Go to a Place..."

Single by Rie fu

from the album Rose Album
- B-side: "They Always Talk About; I So Wanted"
- Released: April 27, 2005 (Japan)
- Genre: J-pop
- Label: Palm Beach Inc.

"I Wanna Go to a Place..." is the third single released by Rie fu. The song was used as the third ending theme for Mobile Suit Gundam SEED Destiny, from phase 26 to 37, in phase 28 and 32, the English version was played instead of the Japanese version. In the remastered version of Gundam SEED Destiny, the song "Shinkai No Kodoku" is played as phase 32's ending theme instead.

Catalog number: QQCL-5

Track listing

1. I Wanna Go to a Place...
2. They Always Talk About
3. I So Wanted (English version)

Charts

Chart	Peak position	Sales
Oricon Weekly Singles	#5	65,915

=== "Kimi wa Boku ni Niteiru" ===
"Kimi wa Boku ni Niteiru"

Single by See-Saw
- B-side: "Seijaku wa Headphone no Naka"
- Released: August 3, 2005 (Japan)
- Genre: Anime
- Label: Victor Entertainment
- Songwriters: Yuki Kajiura, Chiaki Ishikawa

See-Saw singles chronology
"Kimi ga Ita Monogatari / Emerald Green" (2003)	"Kimi wa Boku ni Niteiru" (2005)

"Kimi wa Boku ni Niteiru" is the 11th single released by See-Saw. The song was used as the last ending theme for Mobile Suit Gundam SEED Destiny, from phase 38 to 50, Final Plus and Special Edition IV - The Cost of Freedom.

Catalog number: VICL-35800

Track listing

1. Kimi wa Boku ni Niteiru (君は僕に似ている, You Resemble Me)
2. Seijaku wa Headphone no Naka (静寂はヘッドフォンの中, Silence in the Headphone)
3. Kimi wa Boku ni Niteiru [without vocal]
4. Seijaku wa Headphone no Naka [without vocal]

Charts

Chart	Peak position	Sales
Oricon Weekly Singles	#4	156,172

=== "Result" ===
"Result"

Single by Nami Tamaki

from the album Speciality
- B-side: "Making the pride Stay Gold"
- Released: May 3, 2006 (Japan)
- Genre: J-Pop
- Label: Sony Music Records

"Result" is the 11th single released by Nami Tamaki. The song was used as the ending theme for Mobile Suit Gundam SEED Destiny Special Edition I - The Broken World as well as the ending theme for Mobile Suit Gundam SEED Destiny HD remastered edition.

Catalog number: SRCL-6258

Track listing

1. Result
2. Making the pride
3. Stay Gold
4. Result -instrumental-

Charts

Chart	Peak position	Sales
Oricon Weekly Singles	#5	36,464

=== "Tears" ===
"tears"

Single by lisa

from the album Niji'iro no Kotonoha
- Released: August 23, 2006 (Japan)
- Genre: J-Pop
- Label: Victor Entertainment

"Tears" is the third single released by Lisa Komine under the stage name Lisa. The song was used as the ending theme for Mobile Suit Gundam SEED Destiny Special Edition II - Respective Swords.

Catalog number: VICL-36163

Track listing

1. Tears full version
2. Tears tsubura mix
3. Tears for you
4. Tears memories
5. Tears TV version
6. Tears original karaoke

Charts

Chart	Peak position	Sales
Oricon Weekly Singles	#21	14,461

=== "Enrai Tōku ni Aru Akari" ===
"Enrai ~Tōku ni Aru Akari~"

Single by High and Mighty Color

from the album San
- B-side: "Kaerimichi no Orange"
- Released: October 25, 2006 (Japan)
- Genre: J-Pop
- Label: Sony Music Japan

"Enrai Tōku ni Aru Akari" is the 8th single released by High and Mighty Color. The song was used as the ending theme for Mobile Suit Gundam SEED DESTINY Special Edition III - The Hellfire of Destiny.

Catalog number: SECL-436

Track listing

1. Enrai Tōku ni Aru Akari (遠雷～遠くにある明かり～, Distant Thunder ~A Far Off Light~)
2. Kaerimichi no Orange (帰り道のオレンジ, The Return Trip's Orange)
3. Enrai ~Tōku ni Aru Akari~ (less vocal track)

Charts

Chart	Peak position	Sales
Oricon Weekly Singles	#15	23,742

=== "Stargazer Hoshi no Tobira" ===
"Stargazer ~Hoshi no Tobira"

Single by Satori Negishi
- B-side: "Mikazuki no Puzzle"
- Released: August 23, 2006 (Japan)
- Genre: J-Pop
- Label: Victor Entertainment

"Stargazer Hoshi no Tobira" is the debut single released by Satori Negishi. The song was used as the ending theme for Mobile Suit Gundam SEED C.E. 73: Stargazer.

Catalog number: VICL-36154

Track listing

1. Stargazer Hoshi no Tobira (Stargazer ～星の扉, Door of the Stars)
2. Mikazuki no Puzzle (三日月のパズル, Puzzle of the Crescent Moon)
3. Stargazer Hoshi no Tobira (original karaoke)
4. Mikazuki no Puzzle (original karaoke)

=== "Distance" ===
"Distance"

Single by FictionJunction
- B-side: "eternal blue"
- Released: August 29, 2012 (Japan)
- Label: Victor Entertainment
- Songwriter: Yuki Kajiura
- Producer: Yuki Kajiura

FictionJunction singles chronology
"stone cold"	"Distance"

"Distance" is FictionJunction's fourth single. The title track was used as ending theme song for Mobile Suit Gundam SEED HD remastered edition. "Eternal Blue" was used as opening theme song for the PSP game 戦律のストラタス (Senritsu no Stratus).

Track listing

1. Distance
2. Eternal Blue
3. Distance – instrumental
4. eternal blue – instrumental

== Insert songs ==
=== "Akatsuki no Kuruma" ===
"Akatsuki no Kuruma"

Single by FictionJunction Yuuka

from the album Destination
- Released: September 22, 2004 (Japan)
- Genre: J-Pop
- Label: Victor Entertainment

"Akatsuki no Kuruma" is the third single released by FictionJunction Yuuka. The song was used as the insert song for Mobile Suit Gundam SEED in phase 24, 32 & 40.

Catalog number: VICL-35715

Track listing

1. Akatsuki no Kuruma (暁の車, Wheels of the Dawn)
2. Akatsuki no Kuruma piano version
3. Akatsuki no Kuruma acoustic version
4. Akatsuki no Kuruma without vocal

Charts

Chart	Peak position	Sales
Oricon Weekly Singles	#10	109,777

=== "Honoh no Tobira" ===
"Honoh no Tobira"

Single by FictionJunction Yuuka

from the album Circus
- Released: September 22, 2005 (Japan)
- Genre: J-Pop
- Label: Victor Entertainment

"Honoh no Tobira" is the 4th single released by FictionJunction Yuuka. The song was used as the insert song for Mobile Suit Gundam SEED Destiny in phase 33 and 40.

Catalog number: VICL-35883

Track listing

1. Honoh no Tobira (焔の扉, Door of Flames)
2. Honoh no Tobira: hearty edition
3. Honoh no Tobira: instrumental edition
4. Honoh no Tobira (Original Karaoke)

Charts

Chart	Peak position	Sales
Oricon Weekly Singles	#5	97,179

=== "Vestige" ===
"vestige"

Single by T.M.Revolution
- B-side: "crosswise"
- Released: August 7, 2005 (Japan)
- Genre: J-Pop
- Label: Epic Records Japan

"Vestige" is the 24th single released by T.M.Revolution. The song was used as the insert song for Mobile Suit Gundam SEED Destiny in phase 39, 41, 42 & 49 as well as the opening theme for Mobile Suit Gundam SEED DESTINY Final Plus: The Chosen Future. The song replaced "Wings of Words" as the fourth and final opening for the HD Remaster edition of Gundam SEED Destiny in 2013.

Catalog number: ESCL-2667

Track listing

1. vestige (vestige -ヴェスティージ-)
2. crosswise

Charts

Chart	Peak position	Sales
Oricon Weekly Singles	#1	176,028

== Complete Best albums ==
=== Mobile Suit Gundam SEED Complete Best ===
Mobile Suit Gundam SEED COMPLETE BEST

Compilation album by T.M.Revolution, See-Saw, Vivian or Kazuma, Nami Tamaki, Tatsuya Ishii, Mika Nakashima
- Released: September 26, 2003 (Japan)
- Genre: J-Pop
- Label: Sony Music Associated Records Inc.

Mobile Suit Gundam SEED Complete Best is the compilation of all opening and ending themes featured in Mobile Suit Gundam SEED TV series as well as the insert song "Meteor".

Catalog numbers: AICL-1489-90 (CD+DVD limited edition); AICL-1506 (CD only regular edition)

Track listing

1. "Invoke" by T.M.Revolution
2. "Anna ni Issho Datta no ni" by See-Saw (limited edition bonus track)
3. "Moment" by Vivian or Kazuma
4. "Believe" by Nami Tamaki
5. "River" by Tatsuya Ishii
6. "Realize" by Nami Tamaki
7. "Find The Way" by Mika Nakashima
8. "Meteor" by T.M.Revolution
9. "Invoke" (phase shift armoured version) by T.M.Revolution
10. "Moment" (B4 ZA Beat remix) by Vivian or Kazuma
11. Believe Freedom G Control mix by Nami Tamaki
12. "River" remix by Tatsuya Ishii
13. "Realize" – Everlasting mix by Nami Tamaki

Charts

Chart	Peak position	Sales
Oricon Weekly Albums	#2	342,307

=== Mobile Suit Gundam SEED Destiny Complete Best ===
Mobile Suit Gundam SEED Destiny Complete Best

Compilation album by T.M.Revolution, Nami Tamaki, High and Mighty Color, Mika Arisaka, Hitomi Takahashi, Rie fu, CHEMISTRY See-Saw
- Released: November 2, 2005 (Japan)
- Genre: J-Pop
- Label: Sony Music Japan

Mobile Suit Gundam SEED Destiny Complete Best is the compilation of all opening and ending themes featured in Mobile Suit Gundam SEED DESTINY TV series as well as the insert song "Meteor" and "vestige".

Catalog numbers: SMCL-111~2 (CD+DVD limited edition); SMCL-113 (CD only regular edition)

Track listing

1. "Ignited" by T.M.Revolution
2. "Reason" by Nami Tamaki
3. "Pride" by High and Mighty Color
4. "Life Goes On" by Mika Arisaka
5. "Bokutachi no Yukue" by Hitomi Takahashi
6. "I Wanna Go To A Place..." by Rie fu
7. "Wings of Words" by Chemistry
8. "Kimi wa Boku ni Niteiru" by See-Saw
9. Meteor by T.M.Revolution
10. "Vestige" by T.M.Revolution
11. "Reason" – Nylon Stay Cool Mix – by Nami Tamaki
12. Pride ~"Phantom pain" norishirobreakmegamix~ by High and Mighty Color
13. "Wings of Words (alas de palabras)" by Chemistry

Charts

Chart	Peak position	Sales
Oricon Weekly Albums	#1	351,251

=== Mobile Suit Gundam SEED – SEED Destiny Best "The Bridge" Across the Songs from Gundam SEED & SEED Destiny ===
Mobile Suit Gundam SEED ~ SEED Destiny Best "The Bridge" Across the Songs from Gundam SEED & SEED Destiny

Compilation album by See-Saw, Mika Arisaka, FictionJunction Yuuka, Houko Kuwashima, lisa, Sōichirō Hoshi, Rie Tanaka, Naomi Shindō, Tomokazu Seki, Kenichi Suzumura, Junichi Suwabe, Masakazu Morita, Fumiko Orikasa, Megumi Toyoguchi, Toshihiko Sahashi, Shinji Kakijima
- Released: November 22, 2006 (Japan)
- Genre: Anime soundtrack
- Label: Victor Entertainment

Mobile Suit Gundam SEED – SEED Destiny Best "The Bridge" Across the Songs from Gundam SEED & SEED Destiny is the compilation of ending themes, insert and character songs from Mobile Suit Gundam SEED and Mobile Suit Gundam SEED Destiny.

Catalog number: VICL-62050~1

CD1 track listing

1. "Anna ni Issho Datta" no ni by See-Saw
2. "Life Goes On" by Mika Arisaka
3. Akatsuki no Kuruma piano supplement version by FictionJunction Yuuka
4. Shinkai no Kodoku by Houko Kuwashima
5. "Honoh no Tobira" by FictionJunction Yuuka
6. "Tears" – full version by lisa
7. "Kimi wa Boku ni Niteiru" by See-Saw
8. Original Soundeffect Track – Memory – by Toshihiko Sahashi
9. Anna ni Issho Datta no ni 2006 by See-Saw

CD2 track listing

1. Ima Kono Shunkan ga Subete by Sōichirō Hoshi as Kira Yamato
2. Shizuka na Yoru ni by Rie Tanaka as Lacus Clyne
3. Precious Rose by Naomi Shindō as Cagalli Yula Athha
4. Shoot by Tomokazu Seki as Yzak Joule
5. Nicol no Piano "Namida no Theme" by Shinji Kakijima
6. Mizu no Akashi by Rie Tanaka as Lacus Clyne
7. Primal Innocence ~Bridge version by Kenichi Suzumura as Shinn Asuka
8. Eden of necessity by Junichi Suwabe as Sting Oakley
9. Pale repetition by Masakazu Morita as Auel Neider
10. Quiet Night C.E. 73 by Rie Tanaka as Meer Campbell
11. Emotion by Rie Tanaka as Meer Campbell
12. REY ZA Burrel's Piano "Omokage" by Shinji Kakijima
13. Please by Fumiko Orikasa as Meyrin Hawke and Megumi Toyoguchi as Miriallia Haw
14. Fields of hope by Rie Tanaka as Lacus Clyne
15. Tomorrow by Sōichirō Hoshi as Kira Yamato

Charts

Chart	Peak position	Sales
Oricon Weekly Albums	#14	67,178

== Symphony Suit albums ==
=== Symphony SEED – Symphonic Suit Mobile Suit Gundam SEED ===
Symphony SEED - Symphonic Suit Mobile Suit Gundam SEED-

Soundtrack album by Toshihiko Sahashi, London Symphony Orchestra
- Released: May 8, 2004 (Japan)
- Genre: Anime soundtrack
- Label: Victor Entertainment

Symphony SEED – Symphonic Suit Mobile Suit Gundam SEED is a collaboration album between Mobile Suit Gundam SEED music and London Symphony Orchestra.

Catalog number: VICL-61400

Track listing

1. Opening – Chapter 1: Aoki Umi ni Midare no Yokan (Opening 第一章 蒼き海に乱れの予感)
2. Suspense – Chapter 2: Shinobi Kuru Kaze no Hamon (Suspense 第二章 忍びくる風の波紋)
3. Take off – Chapter 3: Ōinaru Yūshi no Kodō (Take off 第三章 大いなる勇士の鼓動)
4. Memory – Chapter 4: Itoshimi no Senritsu no Kanata (Memory 第四章 愛しみの旋律の彼方)
5. Zafuto – Chapter 5: Seigi to Iu Na no Akai Kawa (Zafuto 第五章 正義という名の赤い河)
6. Death – Chapter 6: Kanashimi no Kienu Sekai (Death 第六章 哀しみの消えぬ世界で)
7. Gundam – Chapter 7: Yureru Kokoro to Chikai no Kizuna (Gundam 第七章 揺れる心と誓いの絆)
8. The Song – Chapter 8: Anna ni Issho Datta no ni (The Song 第八章 あんなに一緒だったのに)
9. A Wish – Chapter 9: Shizuka Naru Heiwa no Chō (A Wish 第九章 静かなる平和の調)
10. Finale – Chapter 10: Tatakai no Hate Todoke Rareta Omoi (Finale 第十章 闘いの果てに届けられた想い)

=== Symphony SEED Destiny – Symphonic Suit Mobile Suit Gundam SEED Destiny ===
Symphony SEED Destiny – Symphonic Suit Mobile Suit Gundam SEED Destiny

Soundtrack album by Toshihiko Sahashi, London Symphony Orchestra
- Released: December 16, 2005 (Japan)
- Genre: Anime soundtrack
- Label: Victor Entertainment

Symphony SEED Destiny – Symphonic Suit Mobile Suit Gundam SEED Destiny is a collaboration album between Mobile Suit Gundam SEED Destiny music and London Symphony Orchestra.

Catalog number: VICL-61830

Track listing

1. Opening – Chapter 1: Unmei no Tobira Akareru Koku (Opening 第一章 運命の扉開かれる刻)
2. Brand New Days – Chapter 2: Shimesareta Sekai to Yakusoku (Brand New Days 第二章 示された世界と約束)
3. Battle in the Space – Chapter 3: Senka Chiri Saku Shikkoku no Sora (Battle in the Space 第三章 戦火散り咲く漆黒の空)
4. The Shadow of his mind – Chapter 4 – Seigi de Nurareta Tsumi o Zaisho (The Shadow of his mind 第四章 正義で塗られた罪の在処)
5. War – Chapter 5 – Sōten ni Yureru Ken to Sakebi (War 第五章 蒼天に揺れる剣と叫び)
6. SINN ASUKA – Chapter 6 – Kirisakareta Omoi to Kunō no Hitomi (SINN ASUKA 第六章 切り裂かれた想いと苦悩の瞳)
7. Spaceship MINERVA – Chapter 7 – Sōmei Naru Megami no Kan (Spaceship MINERVA 第七章 聡明なる女神の艦)
8. ORB – Chapter 8 – Ken Naki Tasogare no Daichi (ORB 第八章 剣無き黄昏の大地)
9. Shyer Soldier – Chapter 9 – Jiyū to iu Na no Kodoku (Shyer Soldier 第九章 自由という名の孤独)
10. STELLAR – Chapter 10 – Kanashimi ni Shizumu Setsuna no Yurikagoi (STELLAR 第十章 哀しみに沈む刹那の揺り籠)
11. After the Glory – Chapter 11 – Mayoeru Tsubasa ni Erabareshi Ashita (After the glory 第十一章 迷える翼に選ばれし明日)
12. Finale – Chapter 12 – Atarashiki Sekai ga Shiru Konmei no Mirai (Finale 第十二章 新しき世界が知る混迷の未来)

== Suit CDs ==
=== Mobile Suit Gundam SEED Suit CD vol.1 Strike X Kira Yamato ===
Mobile Suit Gundam SEED Suit CD vol.1 Strike x Kira Yamato

EP by Sōichirō Hoshi, Toshihiko Sahashi
- Released: March 21, 2003 (Japan)
- Genre: Anime soundtrack
- Label: Victor Entertainment

Mobile Suit Gundam SEED Suit CD vol.1 Strike x Kira Yamato is the first suit CD of Mobile Suit Gundam SEED, featured image song of Kira Yamato, performed by Sōichirō Hoshi.

Catalog number: VICL-61071

Track listing

1. Ima, Kono Shunkan ga Subete (今、この瞬間がすべて, Now, This is the Moment of Everything) by Sōichirō Hoshi as Kira Yamato
2. "Torii" ~Kira Yamato Hen (「トリィ」～キラ・ヤマト編, "Birdy" ~Kira Yamato's Stories) (Suit Mini Drama)
3. Hishō (飛翔, Flight) by Toshihiko Sahashi
4. Ima, Kono Shunkan ga Subete (Original Karaoke)

=== Mobile Suit Gundam SEED Suit CD vol.2 Athrun X Cagalli ===
Mobile Suit Gundam SEED Suit CD vol.2 Athrun x Cagalli

EP by Naomi Shindō, Toshihiko Sahashi
- Released: April 23, 2003 (Japan)
- Genre: Anime soundtrack
- Label: Victor Entertainment

Mobile Suit Gundam SEED Suit CD vol.2 Athrun X Cagalli is the second suit CD of Mobile Suit Gundam SEED, featured image song of Cagalli Yula Athha, performed by Naomi Shindō.

Catalog number: VICL-61072

Track listing

1. Precious Rose by Naomi Shindō as Cagalli Yula Athha
2. "Torii" ~Athrun Zala Hen (「トリィ」～アスラン・ザラ編, "Birdy" ~Athrun Zala's Stories) (Suit Mini Drama)
3. Sakurairo no Kisetsu (桜色の季節, Season of Cherry Blossom Colors) by Toshihiko Sahashi
4. Anna ni Issho Datta no ni ~Athrun Zala feeling~ (あんなに一緒だったのに, Although We Were Always Together) by Toshihiko Sahashi
5. Precious Rose (Original Karaoke)

=== Mobile Suit Gundam SEED Suit CD vol.3 Lacus x Haro ===
Mobile Suit Gundam SEED Suit CD vol.3 Lacus x Haro

EP by Rie Tanaka, Toshihiko Sahashi
- Released: May 21, 2003 (Japan)
- Genre: Anime soundtrack
- Label: Victor Entertainment

Mobile Suit Gundam SEED Suit CD vol.3 Lacus x Haro is the third suit CD of Mobile Suit Gundam SEED, featured "Mizu no Akashi", the insert song in phases 36 and 41, as well as in phase 10 of Gundam SEED Destiny, performed by Rie Tanaka as Lacus Clyne (and in SEED Destiny, Meer Campbell) in the series.

Catalog number: VICL-61073

Track listing

1. Mizu no Akashi (水の証, Evidence of Water) by Rie Tanaka as Lacus Clyne
2. "Haro" (「ハロ」) (Suit Mini Drama)
3. Arashi no Yokan (嵐の予感, Foreboding of Storm) by Toshihiko Sahashi
4. Mizu no Akashi (Original Karaoke)

=== Mobile Suit Gundam SEED Suit CD vol.4 Miguel x Nicol ===
Mobile Suit Gundam SEED Suit CD vol.4 Miguel x Nicol

EP by FictionJunction Yuuka, Toshihiko Sahashi, Shinji Kakijima
- Released: June 21, 2003 (Japan)
- Genre: Anime soundtrack
- Label: Victor Entertainment

Mobile Suit Gundam SEED Suit CD vol.4 Miguel x Nicol is the fourth suit CD of Mobile Suit Gundam SEED, featured insert song "Akatsuki no Kuruma", performed by FictionJunction Yuuka.

Catalog number: VICL-61074

Track listing

1. Akatsuki no Kuruma (暁の車, Wheels of the Dawn) by FictionJunction Yuuka
2. "Creuset Tai ~1. Senpai" (「クルーゼ隊～1.先輩」, "Creuset Team ~1. Senior") (Suit Mini Drama)
3. Namida no Theme (涙のテーマ, Theme of Tears) by Shinji Kakijima
4. Midori no Kōsen (緑の交戦, Combat of Green) by Toshihiko Sahashi
5. Akatsuki no Kuruma (Original Karaoke)

=== Mobile Suit Gundam SEED Suit CD vol.5 Athrun x Yzak x Dearka ===
Mobile Suit Gundam SEED Suit CD vol.5 Athrun x Yzak x Dearka

EP by Tomokazu Seki, Toshihiko Sahashi
- Released: July 23, 2003 (Japan)
- Genre: Anime soundtrack
- Label: Victor Entertainment

Mobile Suit Gundam SEED Suit CD vol.5 Athrun x Yzak x Dearka is the fifth suit CD of Mobile Suit Gundam SEED, featured image song of Yzak Joule, performed by Tomokazu Seki.

Catalog number: VICL-61075

Track listing

1. Shoot by Tomokazu Seki as Yzak Joule
2. "Creuset Tai ~2. Rival" (「クルーゼ隊～2.ライバル」」, "Creuset Team ~2. Rival") (Suit Mini Drama)
3. Sora no Koe (空の声, Voices of the Sky) by Toshihiko Sahashi
4. Ginga (銀河, The Milky Way) by Toshihiko Sahashi
5. Ankoku Keiryaku (暗黒計略, Dark Artifice) by Toshihiko Sahashi
6. Shinrai no Hatan (信頼の破綻, Failure of Trust) by Toshihiko Sahashi
7. Kaze no Ishi (風の意思, Intention of the Wind) by Toshihiko Sahashi
8. Senkyō Hōkoku (戦況報告, Report on the State of War) by Toshihiko Sahashi
9. Shoot (original karaoke)

=== Mobile Suit Gundam SEED Destiny Suit CD vol.6 Shinn Asuka x Destiny Gundam ===
Mobile Suit Gundam SEED Destiny Suit CD vol.6 Shinn Asuka x Destiny Gundam

EP by Kenichi Suzumura, Mika Arisaka, Toshihiko Sahashi, Shinji Kakijima
- Released: June 22, 2005 (Japan)
- Genre: Anime soundtrack
- Label: Victor Entertainment

Mobile Suit Gundam SEED Destiny Suit CD vol.6 Shinn Asuka x Destiny Gundam is the first suit CD of Mobile Suit Gundam SEED Destiny, featured image song of Shinn Asuka, performed by Kenichi Suzumura.

Catalog number: VICL-61611

Track listing

1. Primal Innocence by Kenichi Suzumura as Shinn Asuka
2. "Arcademy Shinkyū Shiken" (「アカデミー進級試験」, "Academy Exam for Promotion") (suit mini drama)
3. Life Goes On TV-Size type1 by Mika Arisaka
4. REY ZA Burrel'S Piano "Omokage" (面影, silhouette) by Shinji Kakijima
5. THEME of MINERVA by Toshihiko Sahashi
6. Primal Innocence (without vocal)

=== Mobile Suit Gundam SEED Destiny Suit CD vol.7 Auel Neider x Sting Oakley ===
Mobile Suit Gundam SEED Destiny Suit CD vol.7 Auel Neider x Sting Oakley

EP by Junichi Suwabe, Masakazu Morita, Mika Arisaka, Toshihiko Sahashi, Shinji Kakijima
- Released: July 21, 2005 (Japan)
- Genre: Anime soundtrack
- Label: Victor Entertainment

Mobile Suit Gundam SEED Destiny Suit CD vol.7 Auel Neider x Sting Oakley is the second suit CD of Mobile Suit Gundam SEED Destiny, featured image song of Sting Oakley and Auel Neider, performed by Junichi Suwabe and Masakazu Morita.

Catalog number: VICL-61612

Track listing

1. Eden of necessity by Junichi Suwabe as Sting Oakley
2. "Yūjō no Basketball" (「友情のバスケットボール」, "Basketball of Friendship") (suit mini drama)
3. Life Goes On TV-Size type2 by Mika Arisaka
4. REY ZA BURREL'S PIANO "Kiseki" (軌跡, Locale) by Shinji Kakijima
5. ONE DAY by Toshihiko Sahashi
6. Pale repetition by Masakazu Morita as Auel Neider
7. Eden of necessity (without vocal)
8. Pale repetition (without vocal)

=== Mobile Suit Gundam SEED Destiny Suit CD vol.8 Lacus Clyne x Meer Campbell ===
Mobile Suit Gundam SEED Destiny Suit CD vol.8 Lacus Clyne x Meer Campbell

EP by Rie Tanaka, Mika Arisaka, Toshihiko Sahashi
- Released: September 22, 2005 (Japan)
- Genre: Anime soundtrack
- Label: Victor Entertainment

Mobile Suit Gundam SEED Destiny Suit CD vol.8 Lacus Clyne x Meer Campbell is the third suit CD of Mobile Suit Gundam SEED Destiny, featured insert song "Quiet Night C.E.73" and "Emotion", performed by Rie Tanaka as Meer Campbell in the series.

Catalog number: VICL-61613

Track listing

1. Quiet Night C.E.73 by Rie Tanaka as Meer Campbell
2. "Hisaku" (「秘策」, "Secret Step") (suit mini drama)
3. Life Goes On TV-Size type3 by Mika Arisaka
4. Emotion by Rie Tanaka as Meer Campbell
5. Theme of Archangel by Toshihiko Sahashi
6. Quiet Night C.E.73 (without vocal)
7. Emotion (without vocal)

=== Mobile Suit Gundam SEED Destiny Suit CD vol.9 Athrun Zala x ∞ Justice Gundam ===
Mobile Suit Gundam SEED Destiny Suit CD vol.9 Athrun Zala x ∞ Justice Gundam

EP by Fumiko Orikasa, Megumi Toyoguchi, See-Saw, Toshihiko Sahashi
- Released: January 25, 2006 (Japan)
- Genre: Anime soundtrack
- Label: Victor Entertainment

Mobile Suit Gundam SEED Destiny Suit CD vol.9 ATHRUN ZALA x ∞ JUSTICE GUNDAM is the fifth suit CD of Mobile Suit Gundam SEED Destiny, featured image song of Meyrin Hawke and Miriallia Haw, performed by Fumiko Orikasa and Megumi Toyoguchi.

Catalog number: VICL-61614

Track listing

1. Please by Fumiko Orikasa as Meyrin Hawke and Megumi Toyoguchi as Miriallia Haw
2. "Shimai" (「姉妹」, "Sisters") (Suit Mini Drama)
3. Kimi wa Boku ni Niteiru TV-Size type1 by See-Saw
4. Mirai (未来, The Future) by Toshihiko Sahashi
5. Kiseki no Kodō (奇跡の鼓動, Beat of Miracle) by Toshihiko Sahashi
6. Please (without vocal)

=== Mobile Suit Gundam SEED Destiny Suit CD vol.10 Kira Yamato x Strike Freedom Gundam ===
Mobile Suit Gundam SEED Destiny Suit CD vol.10 Kira Yamato x Strike Freedom Gundam

EP by Sōichirō Hoshi, See-Saw, Shinji Kakijima
- Released: January 25, 2006 (Japan)
- Genre: Anime soundtrack
- Label: Victor Entertainment

Mobile Suit Gundam SEED Destiny Suit CD vol.10 Kira Yamato x Strike Freedom Gundam is the fifth suit CD of Mobile Suit Gundam SEED Destiny, featured image song of Kira Yamato, performed by Sōichirō Hoshi.

Catalog number: VICL-61615

Track listing

1. Tomorrow by Sōichirō Hoshi as Kira Yamato
2. "Meinichi" (「命日」, "Death Day") (suit mini drama)
3. Kimi wa Boku ni Niteiru TV-Size type2 by See-Saw
4. Nicol no Piano "Haru no Theme" (ニコルのピアノ "春のテーマ", Nicol's Piano "Theme of the Spring") by Shinji Kakijima
5. Nicol no Piano "Wakare no Theme" (ニコルのピアノ "別れのテーマ", Nicol's Piano "Theme of Separation") by Shinji Kakijima
6. Nicol no Piano "Yūjō no Theme" (ニコルのピアノ "友情のテーマ", Nicol's Piano "Theme of Friendship") by Shinji Kakijima
7. Nicol no Piano "Ame no Theme" (ニコルのピアノ "雨のテーマ", Nicol's Piano "Theme of the Rain") by Shinji Kakijima
8. TOMORROW (without vocal)

== Others ==
=== Mobile Suit Gundam SEED & SEED Destiny Clipping 4 Songs ===
Mobile Suit Gundam SEED & SEED Destiny Clipping 4 Songs

Video by Mika Arisaka, See-Saw, FictionJunction Yuuka
- Released: May 24, 2006 (Japan)
- Genre: Anime
- Label: Victor Entertainment

Mobile Suit Gundam SEED & SEED Destiny Clipping 4 Songs is a DVD containing music videos of four songs from Mobile Suit Gundam SEED and Mobile Suit Gundam SEED Destiny.

Catalog number: VIBF-200

Track listing

1. Life Goes On by Mika Arisaka
2. Kimi wa Boku ni Niteiru by See-Saw
3. Honoh no Tobira by FictionJunction Yuuka
4. Anna ni Issho Datta no ni – 2006 mix by See-Saw
