= Vivian Xu =

Vivian Xu may refer to:

- Vivian Hsu (Chinese: 徐若瑄, born 1975), Taiwanese singer and actress
- Vivian Hoo (Chinese: 許嘉雯, born 1990), Malaysian badminton player
