= Sean Lee Yun Feng =

Singaporean businessman (born 1977)

- 李云峰
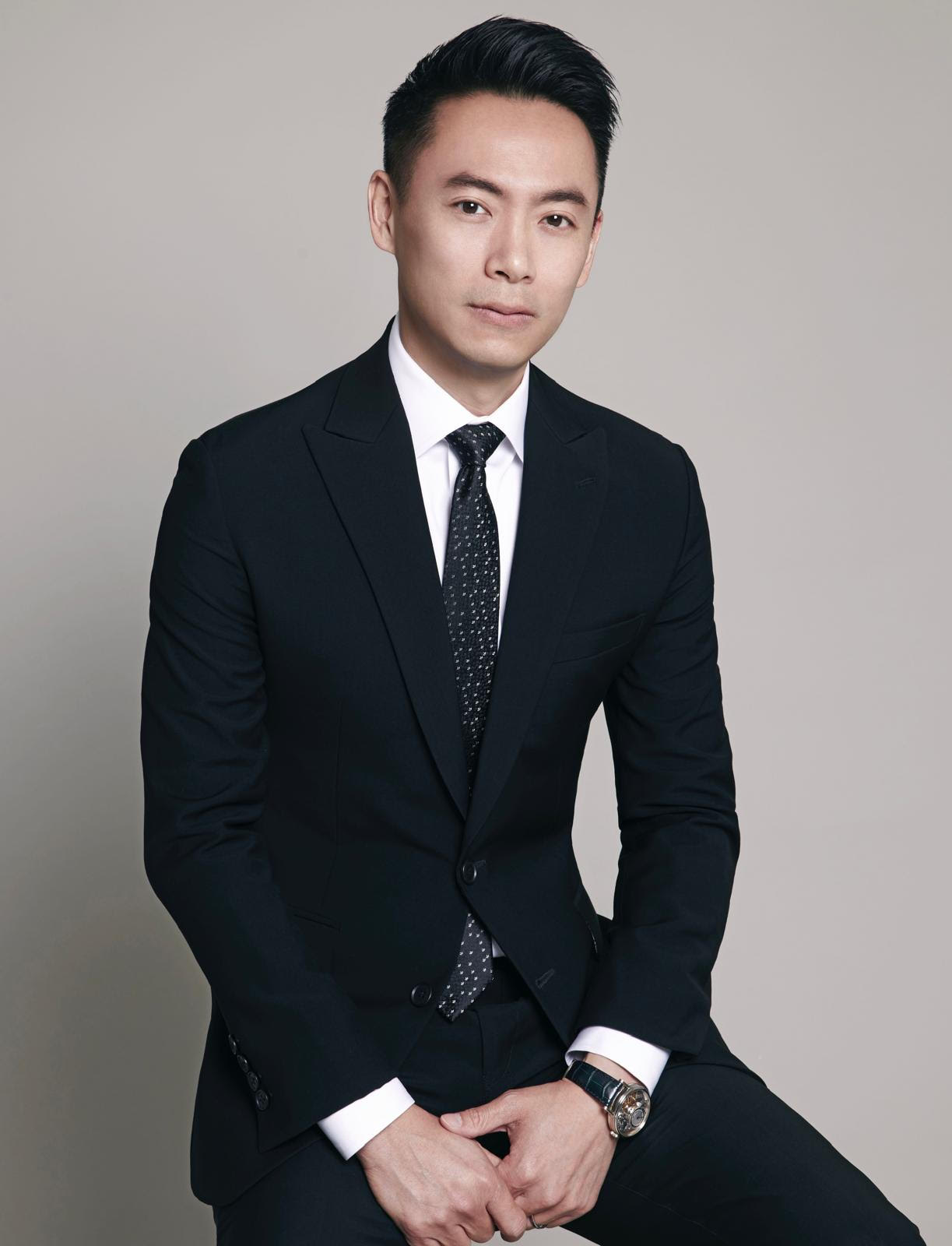
- Born: 26 September 1977 (age 48); Indonesia
- Education: Murdoch University (BCom); INSEAD (MBA); Tsing Hua University (MBA); Stanford Graduate School of Business
- Occupation: Business Executive
- Years active: 2006–present
- Title: CEO of Marco Polo Marine Ltd

Chinese name
- Simplified Chinese: 李云峰
- Traditional Chinese: 李雲峰
Transcriptions
Standard Mandarin
- Hanyu Pinyin: Lǐ Yúnfēng

In this Chinese name, the family name is Lee (李).

Sean Lee Yun Feng (Chinese: 李云峰; born September 26, 1977) is a Singaporean businessman, who is the chief executive officer (CEO) of Marco Polo Marine Ltd, the integrated marine logistic group credited for the first wind farm maintenance vessel designed in Asia. He became the CEO of Marco Polo Marine Ltd in July 2006 and has been its Director since September 13, 2007.

== Early life ==
Lee was born in Indonesia to businessman Lee Wan Tang, who owned businesses in the real estate and mining industry before starting Marco Polo Shipping Pte Ltd in 1991. Lee and his family moved to Singapore permanently when he was eight years old. Lee graduated with a Bachelor of Commerce degree from the Murdoch University (Western Australia) in 1999 and a Master’s degree from INSEAD and Tsinghua University (Beijing) in 2011. He had also attended an executive course in Stanford University Graduate School of business. In 2003, he took over the business and started the shipyard business, Marco Polo Shipyard Pte Ltd in 2005. Subsequently, he founded Marco Polo Marine Ltd in 2006, which expanded to include offshore operations in 2009. He became one of the youngest CEOs of a Singapore-listed company.

== Career ==
Upon assuming leadership, Lee forayed into the shipyard business with Marco Polo Shipyard Pte Ltd in 2005 and founded Marco Polo Marine Ltd in 2006, which expanded to include offshore operations in 2009. In 2016, as Marco Polo Marine stood at the brink of collapse, due to the oil price crash, plummeting its revenue by 50%, Lee refused to give up. He spent the next year visiting 150 potential investors, got rejected 141 times before convincing nine of them to pool together $60 million. He believes in being prepared and transparent with all stakeholders, “sharing good news and risks.”

In an interview with SGX, Lee explained that after the restructuring, the company pivoted towards renewables, repurposing some assets from serving the offshore oil and gas industry to exploring the offshore wind sector. It currently operates in Taiwan’s offshore wind sector and has inked agreements to pursue such projects in South Korea and Japan. For Lee, leading this transition to support renewable energy marks a new chapter of his business.

Under his guidance, the company is developing two new specialised offshore wind service, operation and maintenance vessels namely: Service Operation Vessel (SOV) and the Commissioning Service Operation Vessel (CSOV), designed in Asia for the first time. In April 2025, the company announced the successful flagging of its new CSOV, the MP Wind Archer.

== Awards and recognitions ==
In 2010, Lee won the ‘Young Entrepreneur of the Year’, Asia Pacific Enterprise Award (APEA).

In 2014, Seatrade honoured him with the ‘Seatrade Young Person of the Year’ award.

In 2022, he bagged the award for the Investors’ Choice Outstanding chief executive award.

Lee has been described as one of the best ‘value for money’ chief executives on the Singapore Exchange.

== Personal life ==
Lee married Taiwanese actress Vivian Hsu in 2017, seven years after being divorced with his ex-wife—with whom he has two daughters, Elisha and Clara. The couple reportedly filed for divorce in 2023, citing personality differences and their long-distance relationship as the reasons for the split. Lee and Hsu have a son named Dalton.
