= The Secret to Happiness Is Love =

Studio album by Vivian Hsu
- Released: September 28, 2003
- Recorded: TakeOne Studio
- Genre: Mandopop
- Length: 47:37 (preorder edition 59:53)
- Label: Avex Taiwan

Vivian Hsu chronology
Ai de Xuan Yin (2001)	The Secret to Happiness Is Love (2003)	Hen Hen Ai (2005)

The Secret to Happiness Is Love (我愛你 x4) is a studio album by Taiwanese artist Vivian Hsu. It was released September 28, 2003, by Avex Taiwan. The original title Wǒ Ài Nǐ means "I Love You". There were three versions of this album produced: a limited edition with artbook, a preorder edition with artbook and bonus single CD, and a regular edition without the artbook, but with a VCD containing music videos.

The album contains Hsu's first rap song, Mianju, which was later featured in the compilation album Ji Le 175. Also featured is Jueding Ai Ni (決定愛你; Juédìng Ài Nǐ), the theme song to the TV series Love Storm, in which Hsu starred in.

The album sold more than 30,000 copies within a week of its release, following Hsu's two-year absence from the Mandarin music scene.

== Track listing ==
=== Original CD ===
1. "王子變青蛙" (py. Wángzǐ Biàn Qīngwā) – 5:06
2. "四次我愛你" (py. Sì Cì Dōu Ài Nǐ) – 3:47
3. "Dream" – 4:37
4. "面具" (py. Miànjù, en. Mask) – 4:25
5. "決定愛你" (py. Juédìng Ài Nǐ, en. Decide to Love You) – 4:21
6. "我最好的朋友" (py. Wō Zuìhǎo de Péngyōu) – 4:44
7. "結婚對不對" (py. Jiéhān Duì Bùduì) – 4:37
8. "甜蜜的折磨" (py. Tiánmì de Zhémó) – 4:12
9. "どうして" (為什麼) (Doshite, py. Wèishénme, en. Why) – 4:14
10. "子彈" (py. Zǐdàn, en. Bullet) – 2:55
11. "Baby Baby" – 3:39

=== CD 2 (preorder edition only) ===
1. 決定愛你 <love mix> – 4:31
2. 決定愛你 <TV mix> – 4:24
3. 決定愛你 <karaoke> – 4:21
