= See-Saw (group) =

Japanese pop duo

- Origin: Tokyo, Japan
- Genre: Pop
- Years active: 1993–1995; 2002–2005; 2019–
- Labels: FunHouse; Victor Entertainment
- Members: Chiaki Ishikawa; Yuki Kajiura
- Past members: Yukiko Nishioka
- Website: www.jvcmusic.co.jp/see-saw

See-Saw is a Japanese pop duo (formerly a trio) originally from Tokyo, Japan. Its members included Chiaki Ishikawa (vocals) and Yuki Kajiura; former member Yukiko Nishioka (西岡 由紀子, Nishioka Yukiko) left the group in April 1994 to pursue a writing career. The group temporarily disbanded in 1995, but reunited in 2001.

The duo of Ishikawa and Kajiura performed opening and ending themes in several anime series, including .hack//SIGN and .hack//Liminality, two insert songs for Noir, the first ending theme to Mobile Suit Gundam SEED, final ending theme to Mobile Suit Gundam SEED Destiny and final ending theme to Mobile Suit Gundam SEED Freedom.

== Discography ==
A list of See-Saw's works can be found at vocalist Chiaki Ishikawa’s website. Soundtracks and various artist albums that the group has also appeared on are listed here.

=== Albums ===
- I Have a Dream (September 26, 1993)
- See-Saw (October 26, 1994)
- Early Best (February 21, 2003) [compilation]
- Dream Field (February 21, 2003)
- See-Saw Complete Best "See-Saw-Scene" (June 10, 2020) [compilation]

=== Singles ===
- "Swimmer" (July 25, 1993)
- "Kirai ni Naritai" (キライになりたい; "I Can't Hate You") (September 23, 1993)
- "Chao Tokyo" (March 24, 1994)
- "Suhada (No Make)" (素肌 ～ノーメイク～; "Bare Skin") (August 1, 1994)
- "Slender Chameleon" (スレンダーカメレオン; "Surendaa Kamereon") (September 24, 1994)
- "Mata Aeru Kara" (また会えるから; "Because We Can Meet Again") (February 1, 1995)
- "Obsession.Yasashii Yoake" (Obsession/優しい夜明け; "Obsession/Gentle Dawn") (May 22, 2002) #45
- "Edge/Tasogare no Umi" (Edge/黄昏の海; "Edge/Sea of Twilight") (July 24, 2002) #30
- "Anna ni Issho Datta no ni" (あんなに一緒だったのに; "We Were So Close Together") (October 23, 2002) #5
- "Kimi ga Ita Monogatari/Emerald Green" (君がいた物語; "A Story With You In It/Emerald Green") (January 22, 2003) #18
- "Kimi wa Boku ni Niteiru" (君は僕に似ている; "You Are Similar To Me") (August 3, 2005) #4

=== Soundtracks ===
- Noir Original Soundtrack 2 (October 3, 2001)
- blanc dans NOIR ~Kuro no Naka no Shiro~ (blanc dans NOIR ～黒の中の白～) (November 7, 2001)
- .hack//SIGN Original Soundtrack 1 (July 24, 2002)
- .hack//Liminality Original Soundtrack (September 21, 2002)
- Mobile Suit Gundam SEED Original Soundtrack 1 (December 4, 2002)
- .hack//Legend of the Twilight Original Soundtrack (February 21, 2003)
- Mobile Suit Gundam SEED Original Soundtrack 3 (September 21, 2003)
- Mobile Suit Gundam SEED Complete Best (September 26, 2003 / January 15, 2004)
- Mobile Suit Gundam SEED Original Soundtrack 4 (December 16, 2004)
- Mobile Suit Gundam SEED Destiny Complete Best Dash (November 2, 2005 / May 7, 2006)
- Mobile Suit Gundam SEED Destiny Suit CD, Volume 9: Athrun Zala × ∞ Justice Gundam (January 25, 2006)
- Mobile Suit Gundam SEED Destiny Suit CD, Volume 10: Kira Yamato × Strike Freedom Gundam (April 21, 2006)
- Mobile Suite Gundam SEED Remastered Soundtrack See-saw. Re track "あんなに一緒だったのに Anna ni Issho Datta no ni" "We Were So Close Together". this is going back to 2002 (February 22, 2012)
- Mobile Suite Gundam SEED Remastered Soundtrack See-saw feat Kalifina. Re track "あんなに一緒だったのに Anna ni Issho Datta no ni" "We Were So Close Together". this is going back to 2002 (February 22, 2012)

=== Various artist compilations ===
- Girls' Kitchen (December 1993)
- ILLUMINATED J's SOUND I (February 2, 1994)
- GiRL POP Sengen! (GiRL POP宣言！) (March 1994)
- Snow Kiss ... Ing I (November 1994)
- Snow Kiss ... Ing II (November 1994)
- ROOM, Volume 1: Ima Nara Mō Ichido Hanashitai (ROOM vol.1 今ならもう一度話したい) (March 17, 1995)
- ILLUMINATED J'S SOUND II (March 25, 1995)
- Victor Anime Song Collection I (March 24, 2005)
- Victor Anime Song Collection II (March 24, 2005)
