= Hen Hen Ai =

狠狠愛

Studio album by Vivian Hsu
- Released: April 1, 2005
- Recorded: TakeOne Studio
- Genre: Tai-pop
- Length: 41:06
- Label: Avex
- Producer: David Yen and Makoto Liang

Vivian Hsu chronology
the secret to happiness is love (2003)	狠狠愛 (2005)	Vivi and... (2006)

狠狠愛 (Hěn Hěn Ài) is an album by Taiwanese singer/actress/model Vivian Hsu, released April 1, 2005 on the Avex label. Three versions were released: an unlimited version, a limited version with bonus VCD of music videos, and a special preorder version with the VCD as well as a folder full of various promotional items, including a poster, postcards, and temporary tattoos matching the one Vivian sports in the album art.

The track "狠狠愛" (Love Unreservedly) was nominated for Top 10 Gold Songs at the Hong Kong TVB8 Awards, presented by television station TVB8, in 2005.

== Track listing ==
1. 狠狠愛 (py. Hěn Hěn Ài, en. Love Unreservedly) – 3:42
2. 不由自主 (py. Bù Yóu Zì Zhǔ, en. Involuntarily) – 3:21
3. 我的煩惱是你 (py. Wŏ De Fán Nǎo Shì Nǐ, en. My Sickness is You) – 3:58
4. 愛笑的眼睛 (py. Ài Xiào De Yǎn Jīng, en. Smiling Eyes) – 4:30
5. 歐兜邁 (py. Ōu Dōu Mài, en. Autobike) – 3:41
6. 想入非非 (py. Xiǎng Rù Fēi Fēi, en. Daydream) – 4:25
7. 我的Superstar (py. Wo De Superstar, en. My Superstar) – 3:49
8. 好想你 (py. Hǎo Xiǎng Nǐ, en. I Miss You So Much) – 4:11
9. 幸福的輪廓 (py. Xìng Fú De Lún Kuò, en. Warm Silhouettes) – 5:34
10. Better Girl – 3:55
