= Lisa (Japanese singer, born 1978) =

Japanese singer-songwriter

Lisa Komine コミネリサ
- Also known as: lisa, 小峰理紗
- Born: July 3, 1978 (age 48)
- Origin: Tochigi Prefecture, Japan
- Genres: J-pop, Anison
- Instruments: Vocals
- Years active: 2004–present
- Label: Flying Dog (Victor Entertainment)

Lisa Komine (コミネリサ, Komine Risa; alt. 小峰理紗; born 3 July 1978), stylized as lisa, is a Japanese singer-songwriter. She is known for her songs that were featured in several broadcast anime shows. She is signed under the Flying Dog label. Some of the anime shows include: Gosick, Psychic Detective Yakumo, Linebarrels of Iron, Melody of Oblivion, Mobile Suit Gundam SEED, Rental Magica, and Ristorante Paradiso.

== Singles ==
List of singles, with selected chart positions
Title	Album information	Oricon
Title	Album information	Peak position
"Will"; Opening theme The Melody of Oblivion	Released: May 21, 2004; Label: Victor Entertainment; Catalog No.: VICL-35671	56
"Tears"; Theme song for Gundam Seed Destiny	Released: August 23, 2006; Label: Victor Entertainment; Catalog No.: VICL-36163	21
"Sora ni Saku" (宇宙に咲く); Theme song for Rental Magica	Released: November 21, 2007; Label: JVC Entertainment; Catalog No.: VTCL-35005	28
"Suteki na Kajitsu" (ステキな果実); Ending theme song for Ristorante Paradiso	Released: April 22, 2009; Label: FlyingDog; Catalog No.: VTCL-35057	197
"Key" / "Missing You"; Jangled Cat (Daisuke Ono), Lisa Komine "Missing You" by Lisa Komine; Ending song for Psychic Detective Yakumo	Released: November 17, 2010; Label: Flying Dog; Catalog No.: VTCL-35090	36
"Kaze ni Yosote" (風によせて)	Released: December 1, 2010; Independent label; Catalog No.: FRCL-1002	–
"Resuscitated Hope" / "unity" Ending theme songs for Gosick	Released: April 27, 2011; Label: Nippon Columbia; Catalog No.: COCC-16467	28
"Tears ~ReMix2013"; Lisa Komine, See Saw, Mika Arisaka; Theme song for Gundam Seed Destiny	Released: August 21, 2013; Label: Flying Dog; Catalog No.: VTCL-35161	119
