= Bubai de Lianren =

不敗の戀人

Studio album by Vivian Hsu
- Released: 18 October 1999
- Recorded: Maruni Studio
- Genre: Tai-pop
- Length: 42:26
- Label: BMG
- Producer: Vincent Chen, Naoya Sato, Shinobu Narita, Takaya Kato

Vivian Hsu chronology
Xiang New Edition (1998)	不敗の戀人 (1999)	Fuhai no Koibito (2000)

不敗の戀人 (py. Bùbài de Liànrén, en. Undefeatable Lover) is an album by Taiwanese singer/actress/model Vivian Hsu, released on 18 October 1999 via the BMG label. Vivian's older sister Penny sang backup on some of the tracks, and later married the producer of this album.

Track 10 is a Japanese translation of track 3. Later, almost the entire album was translated into Japanese, and released in Japan as Fuhai no Koibito on 23 March 2000. Exceptions to the Japanese release are tracks 2, 3, and 6, which are original. In Taiwan, the Japanese album was released on the same day as Happy Past Days with a bonus disc with Mandarin Chinese versions of two of the three original songs, tracks 3 and 6.

== Track listing ==
1. "不敗の戀人" (py. Bùbài de Liànrén, en. Undefeatable Lover) – 3:42
2. "不愛了" (py. Bùàile) – 4:17
3. "希臘咒語" (py. Xīlà Zhòu Yǔ) – 4:30
4. "姐你睡了嗎" (py. Jiě Nǐ Shuìle ma, en. Sister, Have You Slept?) – 4:30
5. "蠟燭愛情" (py. Làzhú Àiqíng) – 4:27
6. "不需要理由" (py. Bùxūyào Lǐyòu) – 4:03
7. "21世紀" (py. 21 Shìjì, en. 21st Century) – 3:39
8. "貝殼" (py. Bèiké, en. Shell) – 4:05
9. "Rock & Roll Secret" – 4:46
10. "Ars Amatoria" – 4:27

Fuhai no Koibito (Japan) / Happy Past Days (Taiwan)

Disc one

1. "Arms Amatoria" – 4:29
2. "Happy Past Days" – 4:46
3. "Powder of Star Light" – 4:33
4. "不需要理由" – 4:01
5. "愛する引力" – 4:26
6. "mental" – 3:48
7. "泣いてないのに" – 4:01
8. "不愛了" – 4:16
9. "シアワセニナロウ" – 6:34
10. "姐ニ睡了マ" – 4:29

Disc two (Taiwan edition only)

1. 感情核心 Gǎnqí Héxīn – 3:47
2. 坐在月亮上 Zuò Zài Yuèliàng Shàng – 5:08
