= Tianshi Xiang =

天使想

Studio album by Vivian Hsu
- Released: April 10, 1996
- Recorded: Green Door Studio
- Genre: J-pop
- Length: 36:48
- Label: Toshiba-EMI

Vivian Hsu chronology
天使想 (1996)	Cheonsa Misonyeo (1996)

天使想 (py. Tiānshǐ Xiǎng, jp. Tenshi Sou, en. Angel Dreaming) is an album by Taiwanese singer/actress/model Vivian Hsu, released April 10, 1996 on the Toshiba-EMI label. It was her first full-length album, and was later reprinted, with two extra tracks, as 想 New Edition in 1998.

Although it was her first album, it is not sung in her native language, but in Japanese. Half of the tracks are from her first two singles, and the other half are originals.

== Track listing ==
1. くちびるの神話 – 4:51
2. 100カラットの涙 (Angelic Version) – 4:48
3. 一千一秒の秘密 (Xiang Remix) – 4:30
4. 忘れたい忘れたくない – 4:53
5. ついてゆきたい – 4:18
6. 共犯者 – 4:38
7. 月影で抱きしめて – 4:22
8. 海ほおずき – 4:28

== Release details ==
Country	Date	Label	Format	Catalog
Japan	April 10, 1996	Toshiba-EMI	CD	TOCT-9375
