= Phantasy Star Online 2 =

2012 video game

- Developer: Sega Division 3 (Note: Additional support by Sega Sapporo Studio)
- Publisher: Sega
- Directors: Yu Suganuma; Keisuke Nakamura
- Producer: Satoshi Sakai
- Programmers: Kenichi Tanase; Hirofumi Fujimoto
- Artist: Akikazu Mizuno
- Writer: Ryohei Uno
- Composers: Hideaki Kobayashi; Mitsuharu Fukuyama; Kenichi Tokoi; Tadashi Kinukawa
- Series: Phantasy Star
- Platforms: Windows; PlayStation Vita; PlayStation 4; Nintendo Switch; Xbox One; Xbox Series X/S
- Release: Windows: JP: July 4, 2012; NA: May 27, 2020; WW: August 5, 2020; PlayStation Vita: JP: February 28, 2013; PlayStation 4: JP: April 20, 2016; WW: August 31, 2022; Nintendo Switch: JP: April 4, 2018; Xbox One: NA: April 14, 2020; EU: August 5, 2020; Phantasy Star Online 2: New Genesis: WW: June 9, 2021
- Genres: Action role-playing, Massively Multiplayer Online
- Modes: Single-player, multiplayer

Phantasy Star Online 2 (Note: Japanese: ファンタシースターオンライン２, Hepburn: Fantashī Sutā Onrain Tsū) is a free-to-play online action role-playing game in the Phantasy Star series, developed and published by Sega. Created as a successor to Phantasy Star Online and Phantasy Star Universe, it features gameplay elements and aesthetics reminiscent of previous Phantasy Star games while incorporating a few unique twists on the formula. The first version was released for Windows in Japan in July 2012.

A PlayStation Vita version was released in February 2013, but shut down in September 2020. A PlayStation 4 version was released in April 2016. A spin-off/companion game, Phantasy Star Online 2 es (Note: ファンタシースターオンライン２ es(エス), Fantashī Sutā Onrain Tsū Esu) was released for Android and iOS in 2014. A cloud version for Nintendo Switch, entitled Phantasy Star Online 2 Cloud (Note: ファンタシースターオンライン２ クラウド, Fantashī Sutā Onrain Tsū Kuraudo) was released in April 2018 and then on PC, released in December 2018. At E3 2019, it was announced that the game would be releasing outside of Asia for the first time on the Xbox One and Windows in early 2020.

A massive updated and separate "shared universe" game, Phantasy Star Online 2: New Genesis (Note: ファンタシースターオンライン２ ニュージェネシス, Fantashī Sutā Onrain Tsū: Nyū Jeneshisu) (Phantasy Star Online 2: New Genesis Cloud (Note: ファンタシースターオンライン２ ニュージェネシス クラウド, Fantashī Sutā Onrain Tsū: Nyū Jeneshisu Kuraudo) in the cloud version), was released on June 9, 2021. It was released for Windows, Xbox One and Xbox Series X/S worldwide, with the PlayStation 4 version releasing on August 31, 2022, and for Windows (download and cloud), Nintendo Switch (cloud) and PlayStation 4 in Japan. Although it was released nearly a decade after Phantasy Star Online 2 launch and is substantially different in gameplay, graphics, and content, the creators decided to not name it Phantasy Star Online 3 or focus on creating a game with no backwards compatibility with PSO2 content in order to continue support for current players and to not split up the player-base between two different simultaneously available games.

The game is a commercial success, reported in 2021 to have made over 900 million dollars since its release in 2012.

== Gameplay ==
=== Characters ===
Upon starting the game, the player can select one of several servers, known as "Ships", to play. Players create and customize their characters to be used in the game. The name, gender, race, character class, body and facial features are available for customization during the character creation process, and later, the player can acquire a number of accessories and aesthetic goods to further customize their characters. There are various races available to the players in the game, which include Human, Newman (bio-engineered humanoid elves), CAST (cyborgs), and Deuman (a species that didn't originally exist but due to time-travel was retroactively created in the past that contains recessive genetically engineered Draconian genes in them).

At the start of the game, players may select from one of nine starting classes, each with unique stat spreads and weapon specialties. Four more "Scion Classes" can also be unlocked when the player meets certain requirements. Classes can be changed at will in the game's lobby; levels and statistics earned with a specific Class are independent of progress made with other Classes on the same character. Classes can also be customized with Skill Points earned from leveling up, which can be spent on a Skill Tree to learn Skills unique to the Class; Skill abilities can range from passive effects such as boosting stats to toggle abilities that power up your character temporarily. After a certain level, players can also assign a Subclass, a secondary Class that augments the player's Main Class by granting access to most of its Skills, Photon Arts, and Techniques.

PC Battle Interface of Phantasy Star Online 2. In the Ruins stage, the player battles Falz Hyunal, one of the main antagonists of the series.

=== Interface ===
The user interface and controls are similar between the PC, PS Vita, PS4, Switch and Xbox One. By default, players can play the PC version using a mouse and a keyboard, but may also play the game using an Xbox 360 Controller, which the game supports natively. The player's Character name, Health (HP) and Photon Points (PP) are displayed at the bottom left corner of the screen. At the bottom of the screen, the sub-palette may contain consumable items, class active skills, Techniques and Photon Blast skills. The mini-map is located at the top-right corner of the screen. When a target is acquired, the top-left corner of the screen displays the information and status of the target.

The chat log displays messages left by players and NPCs, as well as system messages. Chat commands can customize text in many ways, such as changing the colors of the text, the font, or using special speech bubbles and animations. The player can also create and display Symbol Arts, images made within the game out of various symbolic objects, or uploaded by the player. Autowords can also be created for a character to react to certain events in battle automatically, such as dying, engaging in combat or successfully completing a mission.

=== Gameplay ===
Gameplay in Phantasy Star Online 2 is mostly action-oriented, and features a large and diverse selection of weapon types and playstyles for the player to choose from.

In combat, players engage enemies in real-time with various attacks; attacks can be chained for additional damage. In addition to standard attacks, combos can be augmented with powerful attacks called Photon Arts that use a resource called Photon Points (PP). Certain Classes have the ability to use Techniques, attacks similar to magic, that also use PP. PP is consumed whenever the player uses these attacks; the player cannot attack with Photon Arts or Techniques if they do not have sufficient PP, but PP naturally restores on its own or can be recovered manually by attacking enemies with standard attacks.

In some areas of the game, Photons can be generated by defeating enemies to fill up the Photon level in the environment. In return, Photon-sensitive effects (PSE) can provide bonuses to the players in that area. When one of these effects reaches the maximum level of 8, an event known as PSE Burst can occur where many enemies will rapidly spawn for a limited time. This can be further extended by causing a different PSE Burst to form a Cross Burst, which can be extended for a lengthy period of time.

Upon reaching a certain level, each player will be granted their own Mag, a small droid that hovers around the owner of it. Mags can be fed a variety of items in order to strengthen and eventually evolve them. In addition to enhancing the player's stats, a mag will support the player with abilities such as healing or buffing under certain circumstances. Mags also enable the Photon Blast ability, in which the player and mag summon a Photon-based avatar for a brief time to attack enemies or support party members, depending on the type of mag. Photon Blasts can only be used after defeating a certain number of enemies and generating enough Photon energy to fill up its power gauge.

Phantasy Star Online 2: New Genesis focuses on an open world field, rather than actual dungeons in the original. Players will be able to explore the field by using Photon Dash and Photon Glide to find hidden secrets around each of the 2 main sectors: Exploration Sectors and Combat Sectors. Exploration Sectors are areas that in which they can obtain food to get boosts and materials to upgrade weapons and armor. Combat Sectors are areas that in which players can defeat enemies and complete trials to fill up the PSE Burst gauge, which are followed by a PSE Burst Climax, which summons a boss enemy. Class Points can be obtained by completing Cocoon Quests and Tower Quests.

== Synopsis ==
=== Setting ===
The game's story primarily focuses on the exploits of the space-faring organization known as Oracle, who uses Photons to traverse the universe and seek new planets for potential colonization while simultaneously suppressing the threat of the Falspawn, alien beings created by evil entities known as Dark Falz that only exist to destroy the universe. Oracle is split between a Mothership, housing the fleet's central core, and a massive fleet of spaceships that contains all civilian entities and the fleet's prime military and exploration department known as ARKS (Artificial Relicit to Keep Species).

Initially, ARKS is sent to investigate activity on three planets: Naverius, a planet whose ecosystem was primarily forest before much of the planet became locked in eternal winter, Lillipa, a desert planet inhabited by rabbit-like natives known as "Lillipans", and Amduskia, a bifurcated planet with a volcanic core surrounded by a mass of floating islands inhabited by humanoid dragonfolk. Later story arcs feature the planet Wopal, an ocean planet, and Harukotan, a planet in the shape of a taijitu inhabited by two opposing races. In EPISODE 4, exploration expands to encompass a fictional counterpart of Earth located in an alternate dimension, and in EPISODE 5, an alternate dimension known as "Omega" located within a black hole becomes the focal point of the story.

Phantasy Star Online 2: New Genesis takes place 1,000 years after the events of Phantasy Star Online 2. The game's story takes place in the planet, Halpha. A new generation of ARKS are Meteorns, people who have landed to a planet via a drop pod, who had advanced techniques, using Photons, to run faster, jump higher and glide between distances. They are also sworn to fight a new enemy, the DOLLS. In Episode 2 Chapter 1 (Chapter 6), they fight against a new enemy, the Starless.

=== Story ===
==== Phantasy Star Online 2 ====
===== Oracle Arc =====
====== Episode 1 ======
The story follows the player character, a graduating member of the ARKS Cadet program, and their partner Afin. During their graduation exercise on Naverius, the Cadets are attacked by the Falspawn, forcing ARKS veterans Zeno and Echo to arrive and rescue the player and Afin. Upon arriving on the ARKS Ship, the player encounters a woman named Xion, who grants the player a Divergence Matrix, an artifact with the ability to alter fate. Returning to Naverius to investigate the Falspawn, the player rescues a girl named Matoi, who has apparent amnesia, and sends her to the ARKS Ship to recover.

The player is sent out to various planets to investigate Falspawn activity. During their travels, they discover the fragments weapon called the Clarissa, one of a series of weapons known as a Cosmogenic Arm, and collect its pieces while being pursued by a mysterious foe called "Persona". The player successfully gathers the Clarissa fragments and entrusts the weapon to weaponsmith Zig for repairs, but the weapon is stolen by ARKS operatives Gettemhult and Melphonsena. The player, Zeno, and Echo pursue them to Naverius, where Gettemhult revives Dark Falz [Elder] and is subsequently possessed. Zeno stays behind to allow the player, Echo, and Melphonsena to escape and is presumed dead.

====== Episode 2 ======
Returning to the ARKS Ship, the player and Xion meet Luther, the leader of ARKS and last member of an ancient race known as the "Photoners". During a visit to Wopal, the player witnesses Luther manipulating and recruiting Theodore, an ARKS member who was driven insane by the death of his girlfriend Ulku. The player travels to Amduskia to meet Xiao, an imperfect clone of Xion, and is granted the ability to time travel to disrupt Luther's plans by rescuing Zeno and Ulku in the past.

Xion urges the player and Matoi to head to the Mothership to rescue her, but the duo are branded traitors of ARKS by Regius, a member of an elite ARKS unit called the Six Pillars, and are hunted down by fellow ARKS. The player and Matoi discover that Luther plans to assimilate Xion and gain omniscience. The duo, aided by other members of the Six Pillars and Ulku, rescues Theodore and presses on to the Mothership's core, where Xion convinces the party to kill her. Luther, enraged by his loss, transforms into Dark Falz [Luther] and possesses the Mothership. Xiao rescues the Oracle fleet by manifesting another Mothership and the party escapes. ARKS confronts and defeats Dark Falz [Luther], and his body is consumed by another Dark Falz, Dark Falz [Gemini].

====== Episode 3 ======
Xiao soon sends the player and Matoi to the planet Harukotan to investigate [Gemini]'s suspicious activity. While there, the duo befriend Sukuna-hime, a local deity, and together they fend off [Gemini]'s attacks. Due to civil war brewing on the planet, Sukuna-hime decides to confront the Nightfaller King, but she is ambushed by [Gemini] and the player and Matoi and are consumed while trying to save her. While in [Gemini], they discover that Luther has survived by being consumed by [Gemini], and he reveals that [Gemini] wants to revive the [Profound Darkness], an ancient enemy of the Photoners and the progenitor of the Dark Falz. The player and Matoi escape and confront [Gemini], but as they are dying [Gemini] infects Matoi with a large quantity of F-Factor, causing her to become a new [Profound Darkness].

The player is confronted by [Persona], revealed to be an alternate timeline counterpart of the player, and is coerced into killing Matoi to stop the [Profound Darkness]. However, it is revealed that by doing so, the player becomes the next [Persona]. With the aid of the Divergence Matrix, the player gathers their allies and tries to stop Matoi without killing her; [Persona], moved by the player's willingness to change fate, intervenes and absorbs Matoi's F-Factor, becoming the [Profound Darkness] in her stead. ARKS subsequently confronts and temporarily kills the [Profound Darkness]. However, since it cannot truly be killed the last part of [Persona] forcefully binds himself and the [Profound Darkness] to a time loop using their copy of the Divergence Matrix. Afterwards the player and Matoi have a bittersweet reunion where they both swear to find a way to both save [Persona] and permanently kill the [Profound Darkness].

===== Earth Arc =====
====== Episode 4 ======
Three years after the events of EPISODE 3 and one year after the events of Phantasy Star Online 2 The Animation, the player is revived from stasis by the operator Xiera to accompany a new recruit named Hitsugi, a young boy, who is suspected to have ties to an internal invasion of fake ARKS members. During the mission, Hitsugi is attacked by a mysterious black mass; the player attempts to purify Hitsugi, but Hitsugi disappears prematurely. "Hitsugi" is revealed to be a high school girl from Earth playing the video game Phantasy Star Online 2, who finds a strange boy with her avatar's appearance in her room after the fiasco. Hitsugi names the boy "Al".

The player is sent to investigate Earth, where they discover that Earth uses a parallel mutation of Photons known as "Aether" that has the ability to resonate with the emotions of humans, and "Phantasy Star Online 2" is an espionage tool disguised as a video game to allow members of a mysterious group known as Mother Corps to interface with and infiltrate ARKS. Discovering that Mother Corps is secretly plotting against ARKS, the player allies themselves with Hitsugi and her brother Enga, a member of a secret organization opposing Mother Corps called "Earth Guide", and fights off various members of Mother Corps wreaking havoc across the globe. Hitsugi manifests a weapon constructed of Aether, the Ame-no-Habakiri, but during a confrontation against her best friend Kohri Wagashimiya, who was brainwashed by Mother Corps, it is destroyed. Kohri seemingly kills Hitsugi, but Al, revealed to be a Dark Falz, revives her, and Hitsugi is kidnapped and taken to the Moon.

The player and Enga rescue Hitsugi, but discover that the player's ARKS Ship had been attacked by Mother Corps. The player and Hitsugi return to the ship, where Hitsugi witnesses Mother, the leader of Mother Corps, assimilating Al, causing Hitsugi to awaken to her true Aether weapon, the Ame-no-Murakumo. The party returns to Earth, where Hitsugi uses her new weapon to save Kohri, and together the party confronts Mother on the Moon. Mother is revealed to be an imperfect copy of Xion discarded into space and seeks vengeance against the Photoners and ARKS. Mother is overwhelmed by the Dark Falz power she stole and transforms into a Dark Falz, but the party defeats her and returns her and Al to normal. However, the party is betrayed by Adam Sacrid, the leader of Earth Guide, who kills Mother and steals her powers.

The party, aided by the remaining Mother Corps members, confront Adam in the Earth Guide sanctuary, and witness him creating Yggdrasil in the Pacific Ocean. Adam takes the guise of a massive Phantasm monster called Deus Esca and seals the party's Aether powers while banishing the player back to the ARKS Ship. Al discovers that Mother's consciousness is still in his body, and Mother possesses him to return the player to Earth and restore the party's Aether powers. The party defeats Deus Esca and Adam, realizing the error of his ways, returns to normal before dying.

===== Photoner Arc =====
====== Episode 5 ======
During an attempt to destroy the [Profound Darkness] permanently by purifying [Persona], the player is sucked into an alternate dimension known as "Omega", where they rescue a young girl before escaping. Returning to the ARKS Ship, they are greeted by Alma, the deceased spirit of the first Klarisklays, who informs them that Omega is form of the fragmented Akashic Records, the source of all knowledge where Xion formerly resided, and has now manifested itself into a black hole threatening to consume the universe. In an attempt to stop the black hole, Alma grants the player the power to return to Omega at will by using her ability to stop time.

Upon their return, the player reunites with the girl, named Hariette, and discovers that the continent is plagued by a strange flower called Ephemera, a manifestation of the [Profound Darkness]'s corruption. The player unites with Hariette to put an end to various schemes across Omega instigated by a mysterious foe known as Elmir. They learn that the countries of Omega are associated strongly with the Dark Falz that they had encountered previously, and during their quest the player re-encounters and defeats each of the Falzes revived in some fashion by Elmir, in the process absorbing their consciousnesses.

Upon defeating the final Falz, Elmir is revealed to be an incarnation of Dark Falz [Persona], who manipulated the player into killing the Falz and returning their essences to Omega itself, revealed to be an incarnation of the [Profound Darkness]. Elmir kidnaps Hariette and seals her in a giant flower, attempting to use her and the combined Falz essences to destroy the outside world. With the help of Alma and allies from Omega, the player intervenes and defeats Elmir, killing him for good. Hariette is saved and pronounced the new goddess of Omega, and the player successfully seals the black hole.

====== Episode 6 ======
After returning to the ARKS Ship, the player and their allies are attacked by the Goddess of Annihilation, Shiva, a woman with an identical appearance to Hariette, and are unable to surmount her Photon-absorbing powers. Risa, a Class Trainer on the ARKS Ship, is revealed to be in possession of Hariette, who has reincarnated in the form of a Cosmogenic Arm in the real world, and they fend off Shiva. The player learns that Shiva is an artificial Photoner and Hariette's original body who was used to seal the original form of the [Profound Darkness], but was revived by the sealing of Omega and now desires revenge by destroying the universe.

Shiva mounts an attack against Mothership Xiao in a bid to steal it for herself; although ARKS is dispatched to defend against her, they are overwhelmed by her Luminmech forces and Xiao is seemingly killed, forcing ARKS to flee. The heroes return to Amduskia to revive Xiao by uniting a fragment of his power with Kasheena, a failed Xion clone whose body lies at the heart of the planet, warding off further direct attacks to Oracle.

The player and Matoi return to Harukotan to help Sukuna-hime fend off Shiva's attacks and eventually attempt to fight Shiva herself by using Sukuna-hime's power to seal Shiva's abilities. Although the attempt fails, Hariette learns from Sukuna-hime how to weaken Shiva by using a similar seal within Omega to affect her on a universal scale. Hariette remains in Omega to maintain the seal while the player and Risa return to the real world.

With Shiva weakened, ARKS mounts a last stand against Shiva's forces, with the player and Matoi leading the charge. Although the duo successfully reach Shiva, they are still greatly overwhelmed by her strength until Sukuna-hime intervenes at the last minute and gives them the power to deal the finishing blow. With her dying breath, Shiva transfers the essence of the [Profound Darkness] to the player, causing them to become the original form of the [Profound Darkness], the Primordial Darkness. Xion reaches out to the player and asks them to avert tragedy by traveling back to the beginning of time and becoming the Akashic Record, but the player, choosing to fight the Primordial Darkness, inspires Xion to reach out to Matoi, Hitsugi, and Hariette to unite their powers. The three heroines arrive and use the Ame-no-Murakumo to exorcise the Primordial Darkness from the player, and together they destroy the source of all evil in the universe once and for all, defeating Shiva in the process.

=== New Genesis ===
==== Introduction to Halpha ====
===== Prologue =====
The player lands on the planet of Halpha in an escape pod and are awakened by Aina and Manon, residents of Aelio Town. Aina explains that those like the player who land on the planet in escape pods are referred to as Meteorns and most are missing their memories. The player fights through several mechanical enemies called "DOLLS" before meeting up with Aina's father, Garoa, and head to Aelio Town. Garoa teaches you how to use photons, a special energy source, to fight the DOLLS. After a short while, a large force of DOLLS attack. Garoa tries to fight the largest DOLL unit but is unable to damage it, and is seemingly killed along with everyone in Aelio Town except for the player, Aina and Manon as Garoa orders you to flee to the caves.

===== Chapter 1 =====
The player heads to Central City where you join the ARKS Defenders along with Aina and Manon. Crawford, the leader of the ARKS defenders, informs you that the large DOLLS unit that destroyed Aelio Town is called Dark Falz and they are preparing a plan to use a special cannon to defeat it as it is too heavily armored to defeat via conventional means, which is why Garoa was unable to damage it. Crawford has the player's group train with Instructor Dozer for a while, but Dozer's squad goes missing at a latter date. The player rescues Dozer and help him defeat a powerful DOLLS unit, Nex Aelio.

===== Chapter 2 =====
Crawford sends the player to the desert region of Retem to enlsit the help of the ARKS Defenders there in preparation for the battle against Dark Falz. Retem is plagued by constant attacks from DOLLS led by Renus Retem, and is unable to send help. The player's group eventually helps Nadereh, the leader of the Retem ARKS to discover a special singing power which allows the player to defeat the Renus Retem and its army of DOLLS. Retem is now able to send troops to Central City.

===== Chapter 3 =====
Crawford sends the player to the ice region of Kvaris to contact Illma, a researcher helping to work on the cannon that will be used to fight Dark Falz. The player rescues Illma and defeats the DOLLS unit Ams Kvaris, allowing Illma to retrieve valuable research data from Kvaris's lost central city to help repair the cannon.

===== Chapter 4 =====
The player is sent to the volcanic region of Stia to meet the ARKS Vanguard unit there, where they have discovered several bases producing DOLLS. The player captures the bases and lure out Dark Falz whom was docked at one of the bases. Crawford orders a cannon strike on Dark Falz which damages it, forcing it to retreat. With the bases captured, Dark Falz cannot repair itself, and Crawford informs the player that they will destroy Dark Falz the next time it appears.

===== Chapter 5 =====
The players fights and destroys Dark Falz in the Central Region with the help of the cannon. Afterwards, Manon disappears on her own without saying anything. A new Meteorn, Pharia, lands in Retem. She reveals that she knows that Manon went to Leciel, the floating structure above Halpha, which can only be accessed from a teleport in the Kvaris Lost Central ruins. The player fights their way through Leciel to rescue Manon, who reveals that she knew the whole war between ARKS and DOLLS was Zephetto's experiment, and she was sent to Aelio Town to help gather data. In a way, she is responsible for Aelio Town's destruction and the death of Aina's father.

But Aina forgives her and the player presses on to confront Zephetto, leader of the Resurgent ARKS, who reveals that the war between ARKS and DOLLS was a 300 year old experiment created to force ARKS to improve their photon sensitivity to fight the Starless, an unknown race that almost exterminated humanity 500 years ago. After the events of PSO2 1000 years ago, the long period of peace had caused their photon sensitivity to decline, preventing them from being able to fight against the Starless. Zephetto has been cloning ARKS defenders to send to Halpha as Meteorns to fight against the DOLLS to try and reclaim the power they had 1000 years ago during the events of PSO2. After defeating Zephetto, he is sastified that the experiment succeeded in raising the ARKS photon sensitivity to 100% just in time. However, the Starless chooses this moment to attack Halpha and Zephetto takes off in a giant mech to fight the Starless, leaving the future of humanity to the ARKS defenders on Halpha.

==== Starless Invasion ====
===== Chapter 6 =====
The player is sent to investigate a scout team that has lost contact. While there, the player is attacked by the Starless. After the battle, Crawford decides to make the player a Guardian, a symbol of ARKS to increase morale. He also announces that they will be working together with the remaining members of Resurgent ARKS to fight the Starless. Aina becomes an instructor, while Manon becomes a researcher. Manon becomes sick with photon deficiency because she overused her Overboost power to help ARKS fight the dolls and everyone helps gather a rare medicine to heal her. The player also helps rescue Aina's training squad when they get ambushed by a large number of enemies.

===== Chapter 7 =====
Zephetto takes control of Pharia temporarily and asks for help as he cannot move from his current location. He gives Pharia the information to get to the Resurgent ARKS headquarters which the other members of Resurgent ARKS do not know of. He specifically requests that the player, Aina, Manon and Pharia alone head there. The player heads to the secret orbital facility that used to be the headquarters of Resurgent ARKS and find an abandoned city which they call the Nameless City where Zephetto possess Pharia again. He explains that Resurgent ARKS discovered an ARKS warrior in cold sleep from 1000 years ago, but were unable to thaw them as the pod was too heavily protected. They could only collect some genetic data from them and use it to make the first generation of ARKS. Zephetto is a surviving member of the first generation and his ability to transfer his consciousness was the product of experiments. Unfortunately, most of the first generation died because they could not withstand the genetic code that was injected to create the first generation and that most of the first generation died or became disabled. This caused a civil war to erupt in Resurgent ARKS as one faction no longer believed they were on the right path, and the pod containing the original ARKS warrior went missing and was assumed to have been destroyed in the conflict.

He also reveals that test subject 909 from the third generation of ARKS was discovered to be in storage, and someone had switched out 909 with you before sending you to Halpha. He suspects that the player is in fact, the original ARKS warrior that was discovered to be in cold sleep from 1000 years ago. If the player has obtained the grand ending in PSO2 Episode 6, the player will also see flashbacks of characters from PSO2, proving that the player's character in NGS is the same as the one in PSO2.

The Starless begin attacking the orbital facility. After defeating some of the Starless, Zephetto shows the player the 4th generation ARKS clone that was uploaded with all of the player's battle data, and that he will now transfer his soul to it as he lost his previous body defeating the Starless Vanguard at the end of Episode 1. The Starless attack again, and the player fights them off while Pharia helps to transfer Zephetto's soul to the clone. The transfer succeeds and Zephetto reveals that this body should have the power necessary to defeat the most dangerous Starless that destroyed the most planets in the war 500 years ago, and was also responsible for destroying Zephetto's anti starless squad and his home planet. However, something goes wrong and a Starless named Vael somehow manages to possess the clone body and use it to attack Aina. Zephetto manages to regain some control and stop Vael in time, and tells you to leave while he sends the body into space time.

After returning to Halpha, Zephetto possess Pharia again and reveals that Dark Falz Vael is the leader of the Starless, and he barely managed to transfer a portion of his consciousness back into Pharia. While Vael will consume his soul soon, the fusion with Vael has revealed the truth of the Starless to Zephetto. The Starless have an insatiable hunger for Photons but found the ARKS members 500 years ago to have insufficient photons for their taste. Vael decided to hide himself inside of Zephetto and manipulate him for 500 years to increase the photon sensitivity of ARKS before starting the feeding cycle again, which is why the Starless suddenly stopped their attack 500 years ago. Zephetto believes Vael will soon complete his transformation using the power of the 4th generation clone and attack Halpha, but the current ARKS has the power to defeat him.

After Zephetto's consciousness fades away, Pharia reveals that he told her how to fix the anti-Starless weapon that they have been working on. After some time, Vael is detected in orbit and you head to the Nameless City to fight it. You fight Vael and pursue it into space using the M.A.R.S, the special armament that Zephetto helped Pharia fix. After defeating Vael, he self destructs and the large explosions knocks you far off into space. Unable to get back to orbit, you are about to give up when you hear Zephetto's voice tell you that you will be needed in the future as his damaged mech appears behind you. You are sent flying back to the Nameless City where you land safely. While The Starless's leader, Vael, was defeated, the rest of the Starless still pose a threat but you resolve to continue fighting them.

==== Alter ARKS ====
===== Chapter 8 =====
Crawford informs the player that they have been exploring the Alter Realm that appeared one day, which is connected to Halpha via a dimensional rift. They lost all contact with the last research team. You search for the research team with Aina and Manon, but are find them fighting a mysterious woman. The research team attacks you as well and doesn't respond to attempts at communication. After fighting for a while, you are surrounded but the mysterious woman opens a dimensional rift back to Halpha, allowing all of you to escape. She reveals that she doesn't have any memories. After reporting the situation to Crawford, all of you decide to head back to the Alter Realm to investigate for further clues.

Along the way, the player encounter datapods left by the research team suggesting that they had found someone they knew and were attempting to track them. You lose communications with Crawford, but are contacted by a strange sounding Crawford afterwards urging you to head deeper into the Alter Realm. Eventually, Aina suggests calling the mysterious woman "Lucia" temporarily as she seems distressed by not being able to regain her memory. You discover that the Alter Realm is an alternate version of Halpha and includes the same terrain features as the original Halpha.

The player eventually discover the bodies of the research team and defeat a Starless ambush. Someone resembling Crawford appears, but Lucia reveals that he is a Starless and has the same feeling as the Starless you have fought up till now. The man calls himself "Alter Crawford", announces that the plan is proceeding but the time is not yet right, and leaves.

===== Chapter 9 =====
Crawford and Pharia reveal that there is no record of Lucia in any of ARKS or Resurgent ARKS databases. The player takes Lucia around to the various ARKS camps but nobody there remembers Lucia and Lucia is not able to recall any memories. The player is recalled to the command room when a giant hole in the waters between Aelio and Kvaris has been spotted, which they refer to as the "Abduction Hole" and that it is swalling up the surrounding area.

Alter Crawford enters the command room and challenges ARKS to stop their plan by revealing the existence of several towers which are used to power the Abduction Hole, each of which has a guardian. He tells them to bring Lucia along to the towers as she is important for the game. The player, Lucia, Aina and Manon enter one of the towers and confront Alter Crawford, who reveals that the Abudction Hole will eventually swallow up all of Halpha as part of the new Starless King's plan, but can be stopped if they destroy all three tower cores, but they are guarded by the three Eidolons which were copies of ARKS made to surpass the originals. He also claims Lucia is on their side and is part of the plan. After defeating Alter Crawford, the tower core is destroyed. When everyone else has left, two figures are partially seen approaching the destroyed tower core, one of whom resembles Garou, Aina's father.

== Development ==
According to Sega COO Naoya Tsurumi, Phantasy Star Online 2 took over five years to develop. Sega "pulled out all the stops", believing the game to be a crucial entry point into the growing free-to-play market on multiple devices. A cross-platform strategy involving PC, handhelds, and smartphones was made possible by the sharing of cloud data. Moreover, Tsurumi stated that the game would serve as a model for other intellectual properties as part of Sega's broader strategy "to further develop the whole of Asia as a single market." A pay to win playstyle that was coming out of Korea and China at the time was not something Sega had in mind. They wanted to prove that they had a viable business model without compromising the quality.

On February 5, 2011, at the Phantasy Star Portable 2 Infinity Nationwide Fan Thanks Festival 2011 in Japan, Sega announced that the alpha test for Phantasy Star Online 2 would begin in the summer of 2011, with participants drawn from a lottery entered through codes included with physical copies of Phantasy Star Portable 2 Infinity. On February 7, Sega listed alternate ways for users to enter into the lottery on the PSO2 website. The game was originally planned to have support in Japanese, English (US and UK), French, German, Italian, Spanish, Chinese and Korean with voices in Japanese. On March 9, 2012, Sony announced that Phantasy Star Online 2 would also be released on the PS Vita. On March 26, it was announced that the game would also appear on iOS and Android as Phantasy Star Online 2 es.

Open beta began on June 21, 2012, as free-to-play. Open beta ended on July 2, 2012, in preparation for release on July 4, 2012. Characters created by players during open beta were carried over to the live servers.

Episode 2 of Phantasy Star Online 2 launched on July 17, 2013, which introduced the new Deuman race and the Braver class. EPISODE 3 launched on August 27, 2014, which introduced the new Bouncer class and Casino, new skills for every class, new items, a new planet, and new quests. EPISODE 4 was released on January 27, 2016, and the main theme was revealed to be 'new experience'. It introduced even more advanced customization features, a new planet (Earth), and the brand-new Summoner class, which focuses on combat with pet creatures, as well as Graphic Tier 6, which featured enhanced graphics.

== Release ==
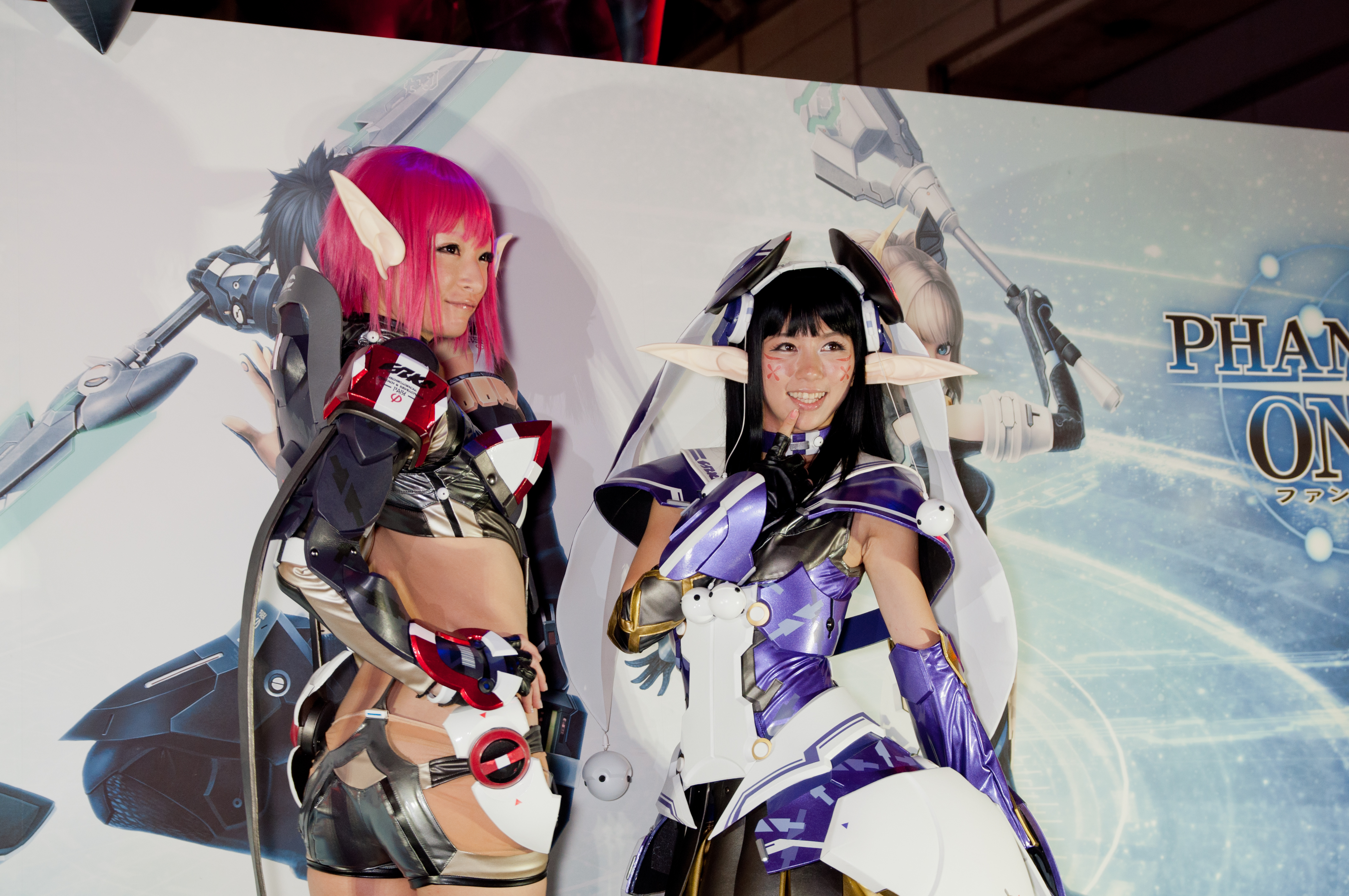
Promotion at TGS in 2012

=== Japanese release ===
The game was launched in Japan on July 4, 2012. The game was free to download and free-to-play, with an optional real money to in-game currency feature known as the "ARKS Cash" system. Sega also has released a retail version of the game on September 13, 2012, along with an installation disc bundled with extra bonuses and in-game items.

=== Southeast Asia release ===
Asiasoft released Phantasy Star Online 2 in Southeast Asia. The game was fully translated to English with huge changes to its menu, items and classes name. This is mainly to make the game much easier to understand for newcomers to the series. They also released a Thai language version of the game for Thailand players only. The closed beta for it began on April 10, 2014, with the official launch on May 29, 2014. Asiasoft announced they would also distribute Episode 2, which was released on March 5, 2015. However, on April 5, 2017, Asiasoft announced they would end servicing Phantasy Star Online 2 to Southeast Asia countries, including Thailand, on May 26, 2017.

There's also a Traditional Chinese version released in Taiwan and Hong Kong by Gamania, which also lasted for three years, before the server closed in early 2017.

=== Western and subsequent global release ===
It was speculated that the western release may have been cancelled in the later half of 2013. In November 2017, the English website for the game was taken down, along with any possibility of the game releasing on the west with it.

However, on June 9, 2019, a North American release was announced at Microsoft's E3 press conference, launching in spring 2020, with no initial plan for a release in Europe, Middle East and Africa. The game features cross-play between Xbox One and PC with Xbox Play Anywhere. On February 7 to 9, 2020, a three-day closed beta test phase was only playable on Xbox One. The reason for the long delay is because Sega did not have right infrastructure in place to operate a North American version.

The game's four week open beta test phase began on March 17, 2020, and concluded on April 14, 2020, to concede the official launch. The PC version launched on the Microsoft Store on May 27, 2020. The Steam version launches alongside EPISODE 4 on August 5, 2020. That same day, the Xbox One and Microsoft Store versions were released in Europe. On September 30, alongside EPISODE 5, the Steam version of the game added more playable regions for the game, with all regions (excluding Antilles, Belgium, Netherlands, China, Japan, and Republic of Korea) able to download and play the game, marking the global release of the game. The Epic Games Store version was released during EPISODE 6 on February 17, 2021. The PlayStation 4 version was released alongside PSO2 New Genesis on August 31, 2022. The global version removed three cutscenes involving three minors in a bathhouse, which was ultimately irrelevant to story or character development. However, later voicelines by the character Xiera commenting on these scenes had not been removed. It also edited a few cutscenes, as in which, Al and Hitsugi were naked in the Japanese version.

The global release features dual audio support with English and Japanese voiceovers, along with brand new English versions of the live concert tracks that are originally sung in Japanese, excluding those from the 3 collaborative live concert events (all of which are English only) (including songs that are sung by Quna (voiced in English by Kayli Mills and in Japanese by Eri Kitamura)). Takenobu Mitsuyoshi voices as himself and performed “We're ARKS!” in both English and Japanese. Furthermore, upon the release of Chapter 2 of PSO2NGS Episode 1 (Chapter 2 of the Main Story), both songs that are performed by Nadereh (voiced in English by Valeria Rodriguez and in Japanese by Azusa Tadokoro) will also feature an English version alongside a Japanese version, with the Manon version performed by Manon (voiced in English by Heather Gonzalez and in Japanese by Yume Miyamoto) as the ending theme of PSO2NGS Episode 1, with the release of Chapter 5 of PSO2NGS Episode 1 (Chapter 5 of the Main Story). The global release also supports Japanese UI text and subtitles with plans of adding the UI text and subtitles in French, German, Italian, Spanish and Russian in the future. However, there were no plans to implement it.

== Anime adaptation ==
- Phantasy Star Online 2
- Genre: Action, fantasy, science fiction
- Created by: Sega
- Anime television series

Phantasy Star Online 2: The Animation
- Directed by: Keiichiro Kawaguchi
- Produced by: Hideki Uchino; Mei Yoshikawa; Yasuhiro Yamaguchi
- Written by: Mitsutaka Hirota
- Music by: Takashi Ōmama
- Studio: Telecom Animation Film
- Licensed by: NA: Sentai Filmworks
- Original network: TBS, CBC, MBS, BS-TBS
- English network: NA: Anime Network
- Original run: January 7, 2016 – March 31, 2016
- Episodes: 12
- Anime television series

Phantasy Star Online 2: Episode Oracle
- Directed by: Masaki Tachibana
- Written by: Hiroshi Ōnogi
- Music by: Takashi Ōmama; Tatsuhiko Saiki
- Studio: Gonzo
- Licensed by: NA: Crunchyroll; SEA: Muse Communication
- Original network: Tokyo MX, BS11
- Original run: October 7, 2019 – March 30, 2020
- Episodes: 25

An anime television series adaptation based on the game aired on TBS from January to March 2016. The adaptation was directed by Keiichiro Kawaguchi at Telecom Animation Film, with scripts written by Mitsutaka Hirota and music composed by Takashi Ōmama. The story is set one year prior to the events of EPISODE 4 and five years after the events of Phantasy Star Online 2 On Stage.

The opening theme is "Zessei Stargate" (絶世スターゲイト) by Shouta Aoi, and the ending theme is "Rare Drop☆KOI☆KOI! One More!" (レアドロ☆KOI☆こい！ワンモア！) by Rina Izumi (Ayaka Suwa) and Aika Suzuki (M.A.O). "Our Fighting" by Quna (Eri Kitamura) was used as the insert song in Episodes 2 and 11. Episode 4 featured three songs: "Endless Story" (終わりなき物語) by Quna (Eri Kitamura), "Try to take me again" by Zeno (Ryōhei Kimura) and "Twin-Star Quality" (双子星クオリティ) by Pati (Kana Asumi) and Tia (Yuka Iguchi).

The anime is licensed by Sentai Filmworks in North America, and was simulcast by Crunchyroll.

A new anime television series titled Phantasy Star Online 2: Episode Oracle premiered on October 7, 2019, on Tokyo MX and BS11. The series recompiled the story of "Episodes 1-3" of the original game, and also included an original story. The 25-episode television series was directed by Masaki Tachibana at Gonzo, with scripts written by Hiroshi Ōnogi, Shigeru Morita, and Bunsei Asanuma, and characters designed by Shinpei Koikawa. Felix Film produces the 3DCG parts, while Studio Kai assists on the animation production.

The opening themes are "Destiny" and "UniVerse", both performed by Aimee Blackschleger, and the ending themes are "Timeless Fortune" by Mika Arisaka, and "Soleli -Dear Destiny-" (それいゆ -Dear Destiny) by Haruko Momoi. All 3 ending themes for all 3 Episodes of the game ("Eternal Encore" (永遠のencore) by Quna (Eri Kitamura) in Episode 1 (also used as the insert song in Episode 9), "Living on like stars" by Mika Arisaka in Episode 2 and "Hello" by Monique Dehaney in Episode 3) are used as ending themes of Episodes 10, 18 and 25, respectively. "Our Fighting" by Quna (Eri Kitamura) was used as the insert song in Episodes 4, 10 and 16.

=== Phantasy Star Online 2: The Animation (2016) ===
No.	Title	Original release date
1	"The RPG That Begins with "Nice to Meet You"" / "The RPG that Starts with "Nice to Meet You"" "`Hajimemashite' kara hajimaru RPG" (「はじめまして」から始まるRPG)	January 7, 2016
2	"The Aloof Warrior" / "The Isolated Warrior" "Kokō no senshi" (孤高の戦士)	January 14, 2016
3	"Roleplay" / "Role-Play" "Rōrupurei" (ロールプレイ)	January 21, 2016
4	"Phantasy Star Offline" "Fantashīsutāofurain" (ファンタシースターオフライン)	January 28, 2016
5	"Aika" "Aika" (アイカ)	February 4, 2016
6	"Forbidden PSO2" / "PSO2 Forbidden" "Kinji rareta PSO2" (禁じられたPSO2)	February 18, 2016
7	"Disappearance" "Shissō" (失踪)	February 25, 2016
8	"Turning Point" "Tāningupointo" (ターニングポイント)	March 3, 2016
9	"Discharge Notice" "Senryokugaitsūkoku" (戦力外通告)	March 10, 2016
10	"Vessel" "Yorishiro" (依代)	March 17, 2016
11	"The Dark Falz" / "Dark Falz" "Dākufarusu" (ダークファルス)	March 24, 2016
12	"The RPG That Crosses Boundaries" / "The RPG That Overcomes Boundries" "Kyōkai o koeru RPG" (境界を超えるRPG)	March 31, 2016

== Reception ==
Registered users for the game exceeded 2.5 million in March 2013. By August 2015, the game had over 3.5 million registered users. As of September 2016, the game has over 4.5 million users. Sega confirmed in 2018 that the PlayStation Vita version had 1.5 million downloads.

Famitsu gave the game a score of 33 out of 40, and the game won the Rookie of the Year 2012 WebMoney Award.

Sega released Phantasy Star Nova in 2014. The game shares similar elements to and is set in the same world as Phantasy Star Online 2, and is also part of the Online series. A novelisation, Phantasy Star Online 2 Side Story, began on June 15, 2014.

The North American release received mixed to positive reviews. IGN gave the game a score of a 7/10, praising the visuals, story, online capabilities, and gameplay, while criticizing the implementation of micro transactions.
