= Mika Arisaka =

Japanese-American singer

Mika Arisaka (有坂美香, Arisaka Mika) (born June 28, 1974, in Kamakura, Japan) is a Japanese-American singer. Due to her upbringing, she is bilingual and has performed in both English and (more commonly) Japanese. She attended Berklee College of Music in Boston, Massachusetts, US. She is a member of Reggae Disco Rockers and has a solo career. She sang both the opening and ending theme songs of Infinite Ryvius, the ending theme for The Twelve Kingdoms and the ending theme songs of Phantasy Star Online 2, "Living on like stars" and "Crying Your Phantasy", from EPISODE 2 and EPISODE 6's normal ending, respectively. With her career taking off, more chances to showcase her singing finally came.

She is the vocalist for the second ending theme for Mobile Suit Gundam SEED Destiny, "Life Goes On". This song was ranked top in Oricon daily single chart on first day of its release, and later ranked fourth in Oricon weekly single chart that same first week.

She was featured on Jazztronik's album GRAND BLUE, on the track "Sanctuary," which came out in June 2007 from Pony Canyon Records, Japan.

She also performed during the opening ceremony of Pride Shockwave 2006, a Mixed Martial Arts event. She led a gospel choir in a rendition of "The Hymn of Joy".
