= Vivian Hsu =

Taiwanese singer and actress

- 徐若瑄
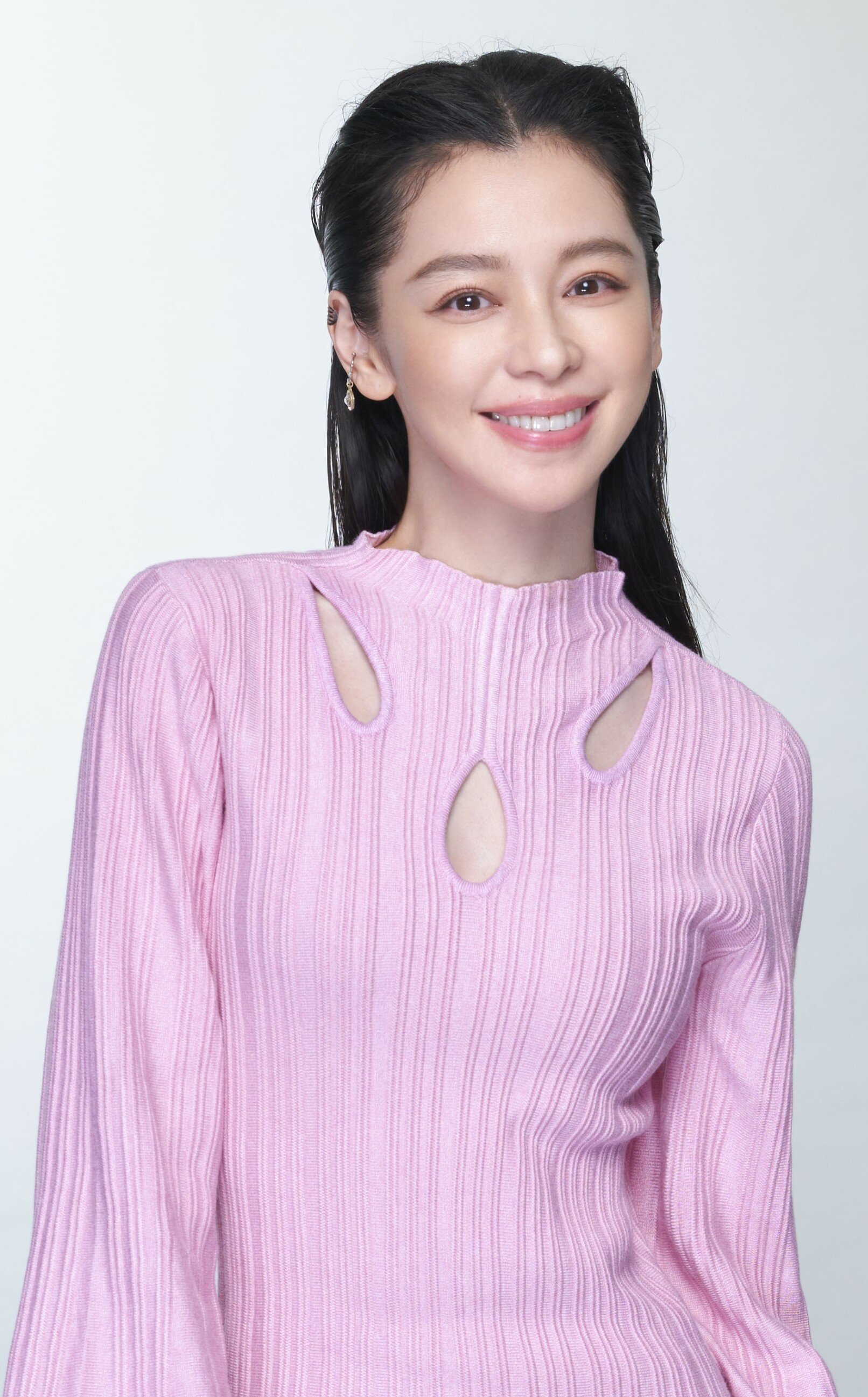
- Hsu in 2023
- Born: Bidai Syulan 徐淑娟 (pinyin: Xú Shújuān; Wade–Giles: Hsu Jo-hsüan); Taichung, Taiwan
- Education: Taipei Shulinguo Junior High School; Shih Hsin University
- Occupations: Actress; model; singer; lyricist
- Years active: 1990–present
- Spouse: Sean Lee Yun Feng (m. 2014; div. 2023)
- Children: 1
- Musical career
- Genre: Pop
- Labels: UFO Record (1991–1992); Eastworld (1995–1996); BMG (1997–2000); Sony Records (2000–2001); Virgin DCT (2001–2002); SME Records (2002–2003); Avex Taiwan (2003–2007); Warner Music Taiwan (2007–2010); Far Eastern Tribe Records (2010–2011); Wonderful Music Co. Ltd. (2014-2015); Rock Records (2018-2019); Sony Music Taiwan (2020-present)

Chinese name
- Traditional Chinese: 徐若瑄
Transcriptions
Standard Mandarin
- Hanyu Pinyin: Xú Ruòxuān
- Wade–Giles: Hsu Jo-hsüan
Southern Min
- Hokkien POJ: Chhî Jio̍k-soan

Japanese name
- Kana: ビビアン・スー

Vivian Hsu (Atayal: Bidai Syulan; Chinese: 徐若瑄) is a Taiwanese actress, model, and singer. In 1990, at 15, she won first place in a talent show in Taiwan and formed Girls' Team (1991–1993). At 19, she moved her career to Japan, where she became active on variety shows and formed the band Black Biscuits. In 1998, she performed on Japan's NHK Kōhaku Uta Gassen. Since 2003, she has refocused her career in Greater China.

== Early life ==
The second of three children, Hsu was born to a Hakka father and Tayal Taiwanese mother as Hsu Su-chuan (Chinese: 徐淑娟; pinyin: Xú Shújuān), and used this name until she began her modeling career. Her parents divorced when she was a young child. She attended Taichung Jianxing Elementary School and Taipei Shulinguo Junior High School.

== Career ==
Hsu's career started after winning first place in a "Talented Beautiful Girl" contest held by Taiwan's CTS in 1990. At that point, she was working by delivering food on her bicycle, and her customers began to recognise her from her television appearances. The same year she joined a musical trio named "Girls' Team" (少女隊). They released two albums, in 1991 and 1992, then broke up. Following this, Hsu started modeling.

=== Modelling ===
As a model, she posed in two photobooks titled Angel (天使心) and Venus. Angel, published in 1995, was shot in Capri and Sicily. Venus, published on July 7, 1996, was shot in Mexico and had separate runs in Taiwan and Japan.

Hsu's success in modeling achieved its zenith in July 1996 when she was featured on the cover of two biography (the Japanese edition, and the comparatively low-distribution Hong Kong edition). Like the photobooks, both these items have become very sought after by collectors and fans.

Hsu has continued to model for designers such as Hang Ten, Gucci and Mode Marie, and has modelled in all three of her brief, autobiographical books: Earth Onigiri (2001), Privacy (2001, ISBN 4-88745-060-5), and Wo Ai Taiwan (2002). In addition, most of her musical albums contain substantial inserts featuring new modelling work.

=== Acting ===
Hsu has appeared in a number of films and television programs both in China and Japan. She appeared in the ambitious 2006 mainland China-Taiwan-Hong Kong collaboration The Knot, a romance film that takes place between the CCP's takeover of mainland China and the present. Her debut film was Shaolin Popey (1994), a comedy film which became a box office hit in Taiwan and Hong Kong. She also has some experience as a voice actress, having voiced Aisha in Gundam SEED for three episodes.

Hsu also starred in three Hong Kong Category III motion pictures, Hunting List, Devil Angel and Angel Heart. She appeared in the 2001 film The Accidental Spy, with Jackie Chan. She played the role of Chao Jiale in Love Storm (2003), alongside Vic Chou and Ken Chu. She also composed and sang the opening theme for this series, Decide to Love You (決定愛你), which was released as a single in 2003. As with many actors and actresses, she appears from time to time in commercials and as spokesperson for various causes. In 2006, Hsu played a role in the film The Shoe Fairy of Do Do, a modern fairy tale.

Since 2010 she has appeared in television commercials for the aesthetic salon Slim Beauty House, and Kao's Essential hair care brand line as one of its three newfaces along with Yuriko Yoshitaka and Nozomi Sasaki.

=== Music ===
Hsu released her first solo single in 1995. She released her first full-length album, Tianshi Xiang (天使想) in Japanese in 1996. Shortly thereafter, she took a crash course in Korean, and released a Korean version of the album titled Cheonsa Misonyeo (天使美少女). Unusually, neither of Hsu's first two albums was sung in her native language.

In 1997, with two Japanese comedians—Kyoya Nanami and Amazan—and later with a second female vocalist known as Keddy, she joined the musical act Black Biscuits. The group was formed primarily as a "rival band" for the Japanese music group Pocket Biscuits, which was the creation of the Japanese variety show Utchan Nanchan no UriNari. Between 1997 and 1999, they released four hit singles and a full-length album, Life. Their single CD Timing recorded 1.5 million sales in 1998. They participated in Kōhaku Uta Gassen in 1998. Towards the end of the group's run, they failed to accomplish one of the challenges set forth by the variety show and the resulting punishment was the disbanding of Black Biscuits.

During this period, Hsu also released two more solo albums: Da Mafan (大麻煩) in 1998, and Bubai de Lianren (不敗の戀人) in 1999. She followed Bubai de Lianren with a Japanese translation, Fuhai no Koibito, in 2000. Later that same year she released another new album, Jiaban de Tianshi (假扮的天使).

In 2001, she formed The d.e.p with Masahide Sakuma, Gota Yashiki, Masami Tsuchiya and Mick Karn. The band was short-lived: by the end of the year they had released all the music they ever would. This amounted to two singles and a full-length album, 地球的病気 -We Are the d.e.p-.

Over the next two years, she released a few more singles, including, alongside Kazuma Endo of Siam Shade, Moment, the second opening theme to Mobile Suit Gundam SEED, followed in 2003 by her next solo album, The Secret to Happiness Is Love. Her last album is Hen Hen Ai (狠狠愛), released in April 2005. Her most recent album is Vivi and..., released in September 2006. For this album, Hsu collaborated with many artists and people including Jay Chou, Wang Leehom, Gary Cao, Nicky Lee and even her little brother and uncle.

Hsu returned to Japan after a seven-year absence to release her new single Beautiful Day on March 3, 2010.

Apart from being a singer, Hsu is also a lyricist, noted for her collaboration with Jay Chou. She also wrote for Leehom Wang, Vanness Wu, Show Lo and Gigi Leung.

== Personal life ==
In January 2014, Hsu got engaged to Indonesian born Singaporean businessman Sean Lee Yun Feng of Marco Polo Marine Limited. They held a wedding ceremony in Bali, Indonesia on June 26. Hsu announced her pregnancy in March 2015 via Facebook calling the pregnancy a "surprise" and "heaven sent" and said it came at a time when the self-professed workaholic promised to clear her work schedule in 2015 to focus on starting a family. On August 13, 2015, she gave birth to a boy, Dalton. The couple divorced on 10 December 2023, nine years after their marriage.

== Filmography ==
Year	English title	Original title	Role	Notes
2001	The Accidental Spy		Yong	
2005	The Shoe Fairy	人魚朵朵	Duo Duo	Nominee - China Film Media Award for Best Actress
2009	The Star and the Sea	星海	Huang Suying	
2010	Hot Summer Days	全城熱戀熱辣辣	Wasabi	
2010	Juliets	茱麗葉	Hsiu-Chu (Segment "Juliet's Choice")	
2010	Dancing Without You	背著你跳舞	Xia Xun	
2011	Warriors of the Rainbow: Seediq Bale	賽德克·巴萊	Obing Tadao aka Hatsuko Takayama	
2011	The Sorcerer and the White Snake	白蛇傳說之法海	Ice Harpy	
2013	Saving Mother Robot	瑪德2號	Cao Yi	
2013	Rhythm of the Rain	聽見下雨的聲音	Sharon	
2018	The Tag-Along: The Devil Fish	人面魚: 紅衣小女孩外傳	Huang Ya-Hui	Nominee - Taipei Film Festival for Best Actress
2020	The Confidence Man JP: Princess	コンフィデンスマンJP プリンセス編	Bridget Fuu	
2020	Little Big Women	孤味	Yu	
2022	Mama Boy	初戀慢半拍	Lele	

== Discography ==
=== Songwriting credits ===
- Adorable Woman, Jay from Jay
- Tornado, Jay Chou from Jay
- Istanbul, Jay Chou from Jay
- Simple Love, Jay Chou Fantasy
- Can't Say Anything, Jay from Fantasy
- The Cliff of Love, Jay Chou from Yeh Hui-Mei
- Want to love you, Jerry Yen "Jerry for you the first time"
- Imagine ten of you, Vanness Wu "Body Can Sing"
- That girl, Vanness Wu "Body Can Sing"
- Fantastic love, Vanness Wu "V.Dubb"
- Reborn, Ken "Never Stop"
- Journey, Fei "Trip EP "
- Paradise, Harlem Yu "Harlem Heaven"
- Emergency Tears, Gigi "Magical Season"
- Hold you tight, Gigi "Sense of Belonging"
- Confessions, Zhang Huichun "Solo"
- Love, Nicholas Tse "Release"
- You say yours I say mine, Show Lo "Show Time"
- Happiness Hunter, Show Lo "SPEShow"
- Love Castle, Cyndi "Honey"
- Go with you Kim Jeong Hoon "Love Strategy"
- If you love, Khalil Fong "Orange Moon"
- Listen to me, Ruby
- Walking together, Kim Jeong Hoon "Love Strategy"
- The Daily Recipes, Wang Leehom "The 18 Martial Arts"
- The Everlasting Happiness, BoBo "Let's BoBo"
- Da Mafan
