= List of Madlax albums =

Madlax is a 26-episode anime television series produced in 2004 by the Bee Train animation studio. Its original soundtrack was created by the well-known composer Yuki Kajiura, partly in collaboration with Yuuka Nanri (as part of FictionJunction Yuuka). Two OST albums and two singles were released by Victor Entertainment in the same year.

== Madlax OST I ==
Madlax Soundtrack

Soundtrack album by FictionJunction Yuuka
- Released: 2004
- Genre: Anime soundtrack
- Length: 59:34
- Label: Geneon
- Producer: Keiichi Nozaki; Yasunori Mori; Yuki Kajiura

FictionJunction Yuuka chronology
Madlax Soundtrack	Madlax OST 2

Track listing

1. Galza (2:55)
2. Nowhere (3:45)
3. Limelda (2:12)
4. Calm Days (3:15)
5. Midnight (2:01)
6. A Pursuit (2:01)
7. Elenore (4:20)
8. The Story Begins (2:59)
9. Vanessa (2:01)
10. To Find Your Flower (2:22)
11. No Man's Land (3:02)
12. The Day, Too Far (2:16)
13. Calm Violence (2:40)
14. Cradle (1:51)
15. Battlefield (2:48)
16. Quanzitta (1:59)
17. Enfant (2:08)
18. In a Foreign Town (3:14)
19. Flame (2:32)
20. Dawnlight (2:02)
21. Peace in Your Mind (1:59)
22. Margaret (3:14)
23. Hitomi no Kakera (4:16)

== Madlax OST II ==
Madlax Soundtrack

Soundtrack album by FictionJunction Yuuka
- Released: 2004
- Genre: Anime soundtrack
- Label: Geneon
- Producer: Keiichi Nozaki; Yasunori Mori; Yuki Kajiura

FictionJunction Yuuka chronology
Madlax OST 1	Madlax Soundtrack

Track listing

1. We Are One (2:02)
2. Your Place (2:22)
3. Open Your Box (2:44)
4. Fall on You (2:12)
5. Lost Command (2:51)
6. Saints (3:52)
7. A Plot (2:41)
8. People Are People (2:54)
9. Complicated (2:03)
10. Cannabinoids (3:33)
11. Friday (3:03)
12. If I Die (2:22)
13. Gazth-Sonika (3:02)
14. Places of the Holy (3:32)
15. A Tropical Night (2:17)
16. Hearts (2:49)
17. Cold (1:59)
18. We're Gonna Groove (3:46)
19. Street Corner (2:15)
20. She's Gotta Go (3:01)
21. Bank on Me (2:20)
22. I Defend You (1:59)
23. Madlax (3:14)
24. Inside Your Heart (3:45)
