= FictionJunction =

Japanese band

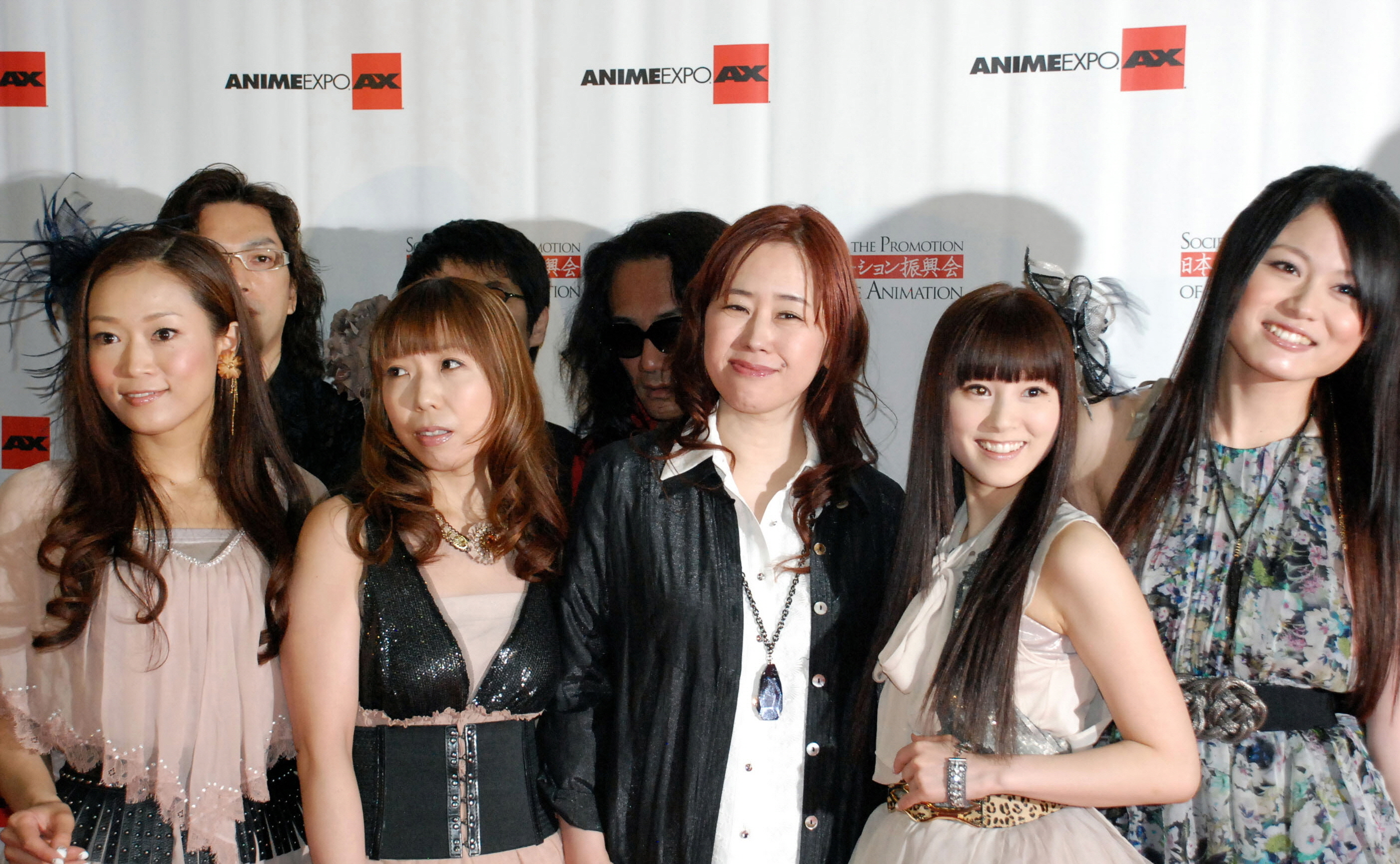
- FictionJunction at Anime Expo 2012, (front row: l-to-r): Wakana, Yuriko Kaida, Yuki Kajiura, Keiko, Kaori

Background information
- Origin: Tokyo, Japan
- Genres: J-pop, Baroque pop
- Years active: 2008–present
- Labels: Space Craft Group (2009-2018); FictionJunction Music (2018-present); FlyingDog (2009-2023); Sacra Music (2023-present)
- Spinoffs: Kalafina
- Members: Yuki Kajiura; Kaori; Yuriko Kaida; Asuka (Aira Yūki); Joelle; Lino Leia; Emiko; Yuuka
- Past members: Wakana (2005-2018); Keiko (2005-2024); Rito (2019-2024)
- Website: www.fictionjunction.com

FictionJunction is the solo project of Japanese composer Yuki Kajiura featuring guests musicians, mainly singers. Historically, works between Kajiura and a vocalist were referenced by adding the singer's name after "FictionJunction". Although both perform under the FJ title and are collaborations with Kajiura, they are separate projects.

== Background ==
Yuki Kajiura had been working on various soundtracks, including one for Mobile Suit Gundam SEED. In 2003, she released the solo album, Fiction. In 2004, she hired vocalist Yuuka Nanri to sing on some of her tracks, including "Chariot of Dawn (暁の車)" which became a hit. In 2005, she added vocalists Kaori Oda, Keiko Kubota, and Wakana Ootaki, who each have their own project.

Kajiura does not consider the group to have "members". At Anime Expo 2012, she said: "To be honest, FictionJunction is not a 'group.' FictionJunction is just me. Well, actually, it depends on the music and the song. We have gathered several members and singers from everywhere. We don't have 'member' members. I *am* FictionJunction. But I am 'collecting' all the singers that are powerful and worthy to be in this group. They are true professionals, each individual here. I respect them, and I do look up to them. They have the most beautiful voices, and that's how they're selected."

== Personnel ==
With the exception of Yuriko Kaida and Joelle, each vocalist has had her own FictionJunction pre-title. Each vocalist's work is considered an individual project. Some of Yuki Kajiura's vocalists now go by a capitalized name (e.g. Kaori Oda went by FictionJunction Kaori, but now goes by KAORI). At Anime Expo 2012, Kajiura brought vocalists Kaori, Keiko, Wakana and Yuriko Kaida to represent FictionJunction.

- FictionJunction YUUKA

Yuuka Nanri (南里 侑香, Nanri Yūka; born March 13, 1984), as FictionJunction Yuuka, is Kajiura's first, longest and best-known collaboration under the FictionJunction name, starting in 2004. The project was originally titled "FictionJunction featuring Yuuka", but the "featuring" part was later dropped to shorten the name. So far, they have released several singles and two full-length albums. Yuuka can also be heard in the soundtrack for Madlax.

- FictionJunction KAORI

Kaori Oda (織田かおり, Oda Kaori; born May 5, 1988) joined the FictionJunction project in 2005. The duo performed two insert songs, "Tsubasa" and "dream scape", which were used in Tsubasa Chronicle. "Calling" was chosen as the ending for the anime series Baccano! and "Hanamori no Oka" (花守の丘, "Hill of the Flower Guardian") "Hanamori no Oka" (花守の丘, "Hill of the Flower Guardian") was used in Hokuto no Ken: Toki Den.

- FictionJunction KEIKO

Keiko Kubota (窪田啓子, Kubota Keiko; born December 5, 1985) joined FictionJunction project in 2005. "Kaze no Machi e" (風の街へ, "To the City of Wind") was used as an insert song in episodes 19 and 21 of Tsubasa Chronicle, and "Nohara" (野原, "Field") was the B-side for the FictionJunction single "Toki no Mukou, Maboroshi no Sora". She was also a member of Kajiura's singing group Kalafina.

- FictionJunction WAKANA

Wakana Ootaki (大滝若奈, Ōtaki Wakana; born December 10, 1984) joined the FictionJunction project in 2005. They performed two songs for the original soundtrack of Fist of the North Star True Saviour Legend: "Hikari no Yukue" (光の行方; "Where the Lights Are") and the Japanese version of "Where the Lights Are" bonus track. She sang "Paradise Regained" (an insert song for El Cazador de la Bruja) and in the Pandora Hearts soundtrack. She was also a member of Kalafina.

- Yuriko Kaida

Yuriko Kaida (貝田由里子, Kaida Yuriko) first collaborated with Kajiura for the Noir anime soundtrack, in which she sang the songs that helped launched Kajiura's career: "canta per me," "salva nos" and "lullaby." Since then Yuriko Kaida has provided vocals for many of Kajiura's works, mainly as background chorus. Kaida became a main FictionJunction vocalist until 2009, upon the release of the album "Everlasting Songs" and the single "Parallel Hearts", lending her voice to "here we stand in the morning dew" and "Himitsu" in "Everlasting Songs" and providing vocals throughout the album. She is the only vocalist in FictionJunction that uses her full name on stage.

- FictionJunction ASUKA

Asuka Kato (加藤あすか, Katō Asuka; born August 28, 1981) performed "Everlasting Song", an insert song from anime series Elemental Gelade. Originally sung in English, "Everlasting Song" was re-recorded in Japanese and released as a single in 2005. It reached No. 53 on the Oricon weekly chart and remained ranked for 3 weeks. She also participated on FictionJunction's 3rd Album "Parade" under her stage name Aira Yuuki.

- Joelle

Joelle Strother (born September 26, 1980) is a singer of Japanese-American ancestry. She joined FictionJunction as a replacement for Wakana (beginning 2019) and has participated in multiple live concerts since 2019 and also recorded studio tracks both as a lead and chorus singer. In her previous work, Joelle sang as a member of Sound Horizon and Linked Horizon, and she has also contributed vocals to Japanese video game soundtracks (including Final Fantasy XIII-2).

=== Other collaborations and groupings ===
- LiSA: She collaborated with the group for the song "From the Edge" under the name FictionJunction feat. LiSA.
- Aimer: She collaborated for the song "Kai" (櫂, "Oar") on FictionJunction's 3rd Album "PARADE". Prior to this, she already worked with Yuki Kajiura for the Fate/stay night: Heaven's Feel movie trilogy theme songs and the ending theme for the second season of anime series Demon Slayer: Kimetsu no Yaiba.
- ASCA: She collaborated with Kajiura for FictionJunction for the songs "Yakō Toryō" (夜光塗料, "Luminous Paint") and "Soukyuu no Fanfāre" (蒼穹のファンファーレ, "Fanfare of the Azure Sky") with Eir Aoi and ReoNa. Prior to this, she already worked with Yuki Kajiura on the theme songs for The Case Files of Lord El-Melloi II.

=== Musicians ===
- Yuki Kajiura – piano, vocals
- Koichi Korenaga (是永巧一, Korenaga Kōichi) – guitar
- Kyoichi Sato (佐藤強一, Sato Kyoichi) – drums
- Tomoharu "Jr" Takahashi (高橋"Jr."知治, Takahashi "Jr." Tomoharu) – bass guitar
- Hitoshi Konno (今野 均, Konno Hitoshi) – violin
- Yoshio Ohira (大平佳男, Ōhira Yoshio) – manipulator (sound engineer)

== Albums ==
=== Everlasting Songs ===
Everlasting Songs

Studio album by FictionJunction
- Released: February 25, 2009 (Japan)
- Label: Victor Entertainment
- Producer: Yuki Kajiura

FictionJunction chronology
''Everlasting Songs'' (2009)	FictionJunction 2008–2010 The Best of Yuki Kajiura Live (2010)

Everlasting Songs, announced November 20, 2008, features all FictionJunction vocalists: Yuuka, Keiko, Wakana, Kaori, Asuka, and Yuriko Kaida. It was released on February 25, 2009.

Track listing

All tracks are written by Yuki Kajiura.

CD (VTCL-60106)
No.	Title	Vocalist(s)	Length
1.	"Hoshikuzu (星屑; Stardust)" (Self cover of "Velvet no Inori" from The Velveteen Rabbit)	Kaori, Keiko; Original: Noriko Ogawa	6:36
2.	"Kioku no Mori (記憶の森; Forest of Memories)" ((Tsubasa Chronicle OAD: Shunraiki))	Yuuka	6:30
3.	"Dream Scape" (Tsubasa: Reservoir Chronicle insert song)	Kaori	5:05
4.	"Gin no Hashi (銀の橋; Silver Bridge)" (Aquarian Age character image song)	Kaori, Keiko, Wakana; Original: Minami Omi	4:27
5.	"Kaze no Machi e (風の街へ; To the Windy City)" (Tsubasa: Reservoir Chronicle insert song)	Keiko	4:58
6.	"Here We Stand in the Morning Dew"	Yuriko Kaida; Original: Saeko Chiba	5:35
7.	"Synchronicity" (Tsubasa Tokyo Revelations song, Arrangement by Koichi Korenaga)	Keiko; Original: Yui Makino	5:20
8.	"Hanamori no Oka (花守の丘; Hill of the Flower Guardian)" (Hokuto no Ken: Toki Den insert song)	Kaori	5:06
9.	"Mizu no Akashi (水の証; Evidence of Water)" (Mobile Suit Gundam Seed insert song)	Wakana; Original: Rie Tanaka	3:59
10.	"Cazador del amor" (El Cazador de la Bruja insert song)	Yuuka	4:50
11.	"Himitsu (秘密; Secret)" (Noir)	Yuriko Kaida; Original: Aya Hisakawa	5:11
12.	"Hōseki (宝石; Jewel)" (Le Portrait de Petit Cossette)	Keiko; Original: Marina Inoue	4:44
13.	"Yume no Tsubasa (ユメノツバサ; Wings of Dream)" (Tsubasa Chronicle)	Kaori; Original: Yui Makino	4:28
14.	"Michiyuki (みちゆき; Going Down the Road)" (Loveless)	Kaori; Original: Kaori Hikita	4:56
15.	"Everlasting Song" (Elemental Gelade)	Asuka	4:34

Charts

Chart	Peak position	Sales	Time in chart
Oricon Weekly Albums	27	10,427	4 weeks

=== FictionJunction 2008–2010 The Best of Yuki Kajiura Live ===
FictionJunction 2008–2010 The Best of Yuki Kajiura Live

Live album by FictionJunction
- Released: May 12, 2010 (Japan)
- Label: Victor Entertainment
- Producer: Yuki Kajiura

FictionJunction chronology
Everlasting Songs (2009)	''FictionJunction 2008–2010 The Best of Yuki Kajiura Live'' (2010)	Elemental (2014)

The album contains recordings from Yuki Kajiura Live Vol.#2: 5. Tracks 1–4 on Disc 1 are from Yuki Kajiura Live Vol.#2. Tracks 5–8 are from Yuki Kajiura LIVE Vol.#3. Tracks 9–11 (FictionJunction Yuuka) and tracks 12–14 (FictionJunction) are from Yuki Kajiura Live Vol.#4: Everlasting Songs Tour 2009. The whole tracks of Disc 2 are new performances that have never been heard on DVDs and are from Yuki Kajiura Live Vol.#5: Japanese Seal SP Live. Hikaru of Kalafina and Yuriko Kaida performed the chorus in tracks 9–11 on Disc 1.

Track listing

Disc 1

All tracks are written by Yuki Kajiura.

CD1 (VTCL-60201)
No.	Title	Length
1.	"The World" (.hack//Sign)
2.	"Vanity"
3.	"Liminality" (.hack//Liminality)
4.	"In the Land of Twilight, Under the Moon" (.hack//Sign)
5.	"Forest" (El Cazador de la Bruja)
6.	"Winter"
7.	"Salva Nos" (Noir)
8.	"Seiya"
9.	"Akatsuki no Kuruma" (Mobile Suit Gundam Seed)
10.	"Nowhere" (Madlax)
11.	"Yakusoku"
12.	"Hanamori no Oka" (Hokuto no Ken: Toki Den)
13.	"Parallel Hearts" (Pandora Hearts)
14.	"Everlasting Song" (Elemental Gelade)

Disc 2

All tracks are written by Yuki Kajiura.

CD2 (VTCL-60201)
No.	Title	Content	Length
1.	"Cynical World" (.hack//Sign)
2.	"The Image Theme of Xenosaga II" (Xenosaga II)
3.	"Voyagers" (Keizai Rashinban)
4.	"Key of the Twilight" (.hack//Sign)
5.	"L.A" (El Cazador de la Bruja)
6.	"Everytime You Kissed Me" (Pandora Hearts)
7.	"Aquarian Age Medley"	1. Darklore; 2. Awake; 3. Zodiacal Sign
8.	"Mai-Hime/Mai Otome Medley"	1. Himeboshi (媛星, Princess Star); 2. Mezame (目覚め, Awaking); 3. Materialise; 4. Sei Otome no Inori (聖乙女の祈り, Prayer of the Holy Maiden)
9.	"I Reach for the Sun" (El Cazador de la Bruja)
10.	"Open Your Heart" (.hack//Sign)
11.	"Farewell Song" (Noir)

Charts

Chart	Peak position	Sales	Time in chart
Oricon Weekly Albums	23	4,211	3 weeks

=== Elemental ===
Elemental

Studio album by FictionJunction
- Released: January 22, 2014 (Japan)
- Label: Victor Entertainment
- Producer: Yuki Kajiura

FictionJunction chronology
FictionJunction 2008–2010 The Best of Yuki Kajiura Live (2010)	''Elemental'' (2014)	Parade (2023)

Elemental, FictionJunction's second studio album, features Yuuka, Keiko, Wakana, Kaori, and Yuriko Kaida. It was released on January 22, 2014.

Track listing

All tracks are written by Yuki Kajiura.

CD (VTCL-60361)
No.	Title	Vocalist(s)	Length
1.	"elemental"	Kaori
2.	"storytelling"	Kaori
3.	"Hitorigoto (ひとりごと; Monologue)"	Wakana, Kaori, Keiko, Yuriko Kaida
4.	"Toki no Mukou Maboroshi no Sora (時の向こう 幻の空; The Sky of Illusions Beyond Time)" (Ookami Kakushi opening theme)	Wakana, Kaori, Keiko, Yuriko Kaida
5.	"Hitomi no Chikara (ひとみのちから; The Power of Our Eyes)"	Yuuka
6.	"storm" (Mai-Otome Zwei OVA 2nd Ending Theme)	Wakana, Keiko; Original: Ami Koshimizu
7.	"eternal blue" (PSP Game Senritsu no Stratus Opening Theme)	Wakana, Kaori, Keiko, Yuriko Kaida
8.	"stone cold" (Sacred Seven opening theme)	Wakana, Kaori, Keiko, Yuriko Kaida
9.	"Nohara (野原; Field)"	Keiko
10.	"Parallel Hearts" (Pandora Hearts opening theme)	Wakana, Kaori, Keiko, Yuriko Kaida
11.	"gaika (凱歌; Victory Song)"	Wakana
12.	"Yakusoku (約束; Promise)"	Yuuka
13.	"Distance" (Mobile Suit Gundam SEED HD ending theme)	Wakana, Kaori, Keiko, Yuriko Kaida

Charts

Chart	Peak position	Sales	Time in chart
Oricon Weekly Albums	12		5 weeks

=== Parade ===
Parade

Studio album by FictionJunction
- Released: April 19, 2023 (Japan)
- Language: Japanese
- Label: SACRA MUSIC
- Producer: Yuki Kajiura

FictionJunction chronology
elemental (2014)	''Parade'' (2023)

Parade (stylized all caps), FictionJunction's third studio album, features ASCA, Keiko, LiSA, Joelle, Aimer, rito, Aira Yūki, Kaori, ReoNa, LINO LEIA, Eir Aoi, and Yuriko Kaida. It was released on April 19, 2023.

Track listing

All tracks are written by Yuki Kajiura.

CD (VTCL-60361)
No.	Title	Vocalist(s)	Length
1.	"Prologue"	Kaori, Keiko, Yuriko Kaida, Joelle	2:11
2.	"Koto no hokka Yawarai (ことのほかやわらかい, Otherwise Soft)"	Kaori, Keiko, Yuriko Kaida, Joelle	5:34
3.	"Yakō Toryō (夜光塗料, Luminous Paint)"	ASCA	4:34
4.	"Beginning"	Kaori, Keiko, Yuriko Kaida, Joelle; Original: Saeko Chiba	5:13
5.	"Mou Kimi no Koto Mitainai (もう君のことを見たくない, I don't want to see you anymore)"	rito	5:12
6.	"Kai (櫂, Paddle)"	Aimer	5:01
7.	"Soukyuu no Fanfare (蒼穹のファンファーレ, Fanfare of the Azure Sky)" (Sword Art Online 10th anniversary Theme Song)	Eir Aoi, ASCA, ReoNa	5:21
8.	"Hachigatsu no Organ (八月のオルガン, The Organ of August)"	LINO LEIA	6:15
9.	"Sore wa Chiisana Hikari no Youna (それは小さな光のような; It's Like a Small Light)" (Erased ending theme)	Keiko; Original: Sayuri	5:30
10.	"from the edge" (Demon Slayer: Kimetsu no Yaiba ending theme)	LiSA	4:40
11.	"moonlight melody" (Princess Principal)	Kaori, Keiko, Yuriko Kaida, Joelle; Original: Yō Taichi and Akari Kageyama	4:38
12.	"Sekai no Hate (世界の果て; The End of the World)"	Aira Yūki; Original: Saeko Chiba	4:19
13.	"Parade"	Kaori, Keiko, Yuriko Kaida, Joelle	5:09

Charts

Chart	Peak position	Sales	Time in chart
Oricon Weekly Albums	7		8 weeks

== Singles ==
=== "Parallel Hearts" ===
Parallel Hearts

Single album by FictionJunction
- Released: April 29, 2009
- Language: Japanese
- Label: FlyingDog

"Parallel Hearts" is a single featuring Yuriko Kaida, Keiko, Kaori and Wakana under the name FictionJunction. The title track was used as opening theme song for the anime television series Pandora Hearts.
Catalog Number

VTCL – 35065

Track listing

All tracks are written by Yuki Kajiura.

CD (VTCL-60361)
No.	Title	Vocalist(s)	Length
1.	"Parallel Hearts"	Wakana, Kaori, Keiko, Yuriko Kaida
2.	"Hitomi no Chikara (ひとみのちから, Power of the Eyes)"	Yuuka, Kaori, Yuriko Kaida
3.	"Parallel Hearts ~Instrumental~"
4.	"Hitomi no Chikara~Instrumental~ (ひとみのちから~Instrumental~)"

Charts

Chart	Peak position	Sales	Time in chart
Oricon Weekly Singles	20	14,546	12 weeks

=== "Toki no Mukou Maboroshi no Sora" ===
"Toki no Mukou Maboroshi no Sora" is FictionJunction's second single. The title track was used as opening theme song for the anime television series Ōkami Kakushi.

Track listing

1. "Toki no Mukou Maboroshi no Sora" (時の向こう 幻の空; "sky of illusions beyond time")
  - Vocalists: Kaori, Keiko, Wakana, Yuriko Kaida
2. "Nohara" (野原; "field")
  - Vocalist: Keiko
3. "Toki no Mukou Maboroshi no Sora: Instrumental"
4. "Nohara: Instrumental"

Charts

Chart	Peak position	Sales	Time in chart
Oricon Weekly Singles	19	9,952	8 weeks

=== "stone cold" ===
"stone cold" is FictionJunction's third single, released August 3, 2011. The title track was used as opening theme song for the anime television series Sacred Seven.

Track listing

1. "stone cold" (Sacred Seven Opening Theme)
  - Vocalists: Kaori, Keiko, Wakana, Yuriko Kaida
2. "Hitorigoto" (ひとりごと; "soliloquy")
  - Vocalists: Kaori, Keiko
3. "stone cold -Instrumental-"
4. "Hitorigoto -Instrumental-"

Charts

Chart	Peak position	Sales	Time in chart
Oricon Weekly Singles	16	12,444	9 weeks

=== "Distance" ===
"Distance" is FictionJunction's fourth single. The title track was used as ending theme song for the HD remastered edition of the anime television series Mobile Suit Gundam SEED. The single was paired with the track "eternal blue", which was used as opening theme song for the PSP game Senritsu no Stratus.

Track listing

1. "Distance"
  - Vocalists: Kaori, Keiko, Wakana, Yuriko Kaida
2. "eternal blue"
  - Vocalists: Kaori, Keiko, Wakana, Yuriko Kaida
3. "Distance -Instrumental-"
4. "eternal blue -Instrumental-"

== Live DVDs ==
=== Yuki Kajiura Live Vol.#2 2008.07.31 ===
Yuki Kajiura Live Vol.#2 2008.07.31

Video by FictionJunction
- Released: December 24, 2008 (Japan)
- Label: Victor Entertainment
- Producer: Yuki Kajiura

FictionJunction chronology
''Yuki Kajiura Live Vol.#2 2008.07.31'' (2008)	FictionJunction Yuuka: Yuki Kajiura Live Vol.#4 Part I: Everlasting Songs Tour 2009 (2009)

Yuki Kajiura Live Vol.#2 is Yuki Kajiura's first live concert released on DVD. It features the vocals of FictionJunction and guest vocalist Eri Itō.

All tracks are written by Yuki Kajiura.

DVD (VTBL-2)
No.	Title	Length
1.	"The World"
2.	"Dream Scape"
3.	"Vanity"
4.	"Liminality"
5.	"In the Land of Twilight, Under the Moon"
6.	"The Main Theme of Petit Cossette"
7.	"Houseki"
8.	"Fake Wings"
9.	"Himeboshi"
10.	"Mezame"
11.	"You Are My Love"
12.	"Godsibb"
13.	"A Song of Storm and Fire"
14.	"Canta Per Me"
15.	"Salva Nos"
16.	"Zodiacal Sign"
17.	"Open Your Heart"
18.	"Everlasting Song"
19.	"Yume no Tsubasa"
20.	"Ring Your Song"

=== FictionJunction Yuuka: Yuki Kajiura Live Vol.#4 Part I: Everlasting Songs Tour 2009 ===
FictionJunction Yuuka: Yuki Kajiura Live Vol.#4 Part I: Everlasting Songs Tour 2009

Video by FictionJunction Yuuka
- Released: October 21, 2009 (Japan)
- Label: Victor Entertainment
- Producer: Yuki Kajiura

FictionJunction Yuuka chronology
Yuki Kajiura Live Vol.#2 (2008)	''FictionJunction Yuuka: Yuki Kajiura Live Vol.#4 Part I: Everlasting Songs Tour 2009'' (2009)	FictionJunction: Yuki Kajiura Live Vol.#4 Part II: Everlasting Songs Tour 2009 (2009)

FictionJunction Yuuka: Yuki Kajiura Live Vol.#4 Part I: Everlasting Songs Tour 2009 features FictionJunction Yuuka (Yuuka Nanri) as main vocalist, and Yuriko Kaida and Hikaru Masai on chorus. The limited edition comes with a photo booklet and PV version of "Nostalgia". The DVD reached No. 49 on the Oricon charts and remained in the rankings for 2 weeks.

All tracks are written by Yuki Kajiura.

DVD (VTBL-7)
No.	Title	Length
1.	"Circus"
2.	"Aikoi"
3.	"Silly-Go-Round"
4.	"Honoo no Tobira"
5.	"Yorokobi"
6.	"Nostalgia"
7.	"Kouya Ruten"
8.	"Piano"
9.	"Akatsuki no Kuruma"
10.	"Cazador del Amor"
11.	"Kioku no Mori"
12.	"Nowhere"
13.	"Yakusoku"
14.	"[BGM] Inside Your Heart"
15.	"Angel Gate"

=== FictionJunction: Yuki Kajiura Live Vol.#4 Part II: Everlasting Songs Tour 2009 ===
FictionJunction: Yuki Kajiura Live Vol.#4 Part II: Everlasting Songs Tour 2009

Video by FictionJunction
- Released: December 23, 2009 (Japan)
- Label: Victor Entertainment
- Producer: Yuki Kajiura

FictionJunction chronology
FictionJunction Yuuka: Yuki Kajiura Live Vol.#4 Part I: Everlasting Songs Tour 2009 (2009)	''FictionJunction: Yuki Kajiura Live Vol.#4 Part II: Everlasting Songs Tour 2009'' (2009)

FictionJunction: Yuki Kajiura Live Vol.#4 Part II: Everlasting Songs Tour 2009 features the vocals of FictionJunction (Wakana Ootaki, Keiko Kubota, Kaori Oda, and Yuriko Kaida). The limited edition comes with a photo booklet and the PV version of "Parallel Hearts".

All tracks are written by Yuki Kajiura.

DVD (VTBL-8)
No.	Title	Length
1.	"Hoshikuzu"
2.	"Here We Stand in the Morning Dew"
3.	"Gin no Hashi"
4.	"Hanamori no Oka"
5.	"Houseki"
6.	"Synchronicity"
7.	"Mizu no Akashi"
8.	"Michiyuki"
9.	"Mezame"
10.	"Salva Nos"
11.	"Zodical Sign"
12.	"Parallel Hearts"
13.	"Everlasting Song" (Encore)
14.	"Yume no Tsubasa"
15.	"Angel Gate" (with Yuuka & Hikaru)
16.	"[BGM] Everlasting Song"

== Others ==
FictionJunction sang a cover of "Gatherway" for the album Harvest, which was arranged by Kajiura and their live guitarist Koichi Korenaga.
