= Circus (FictionJunction Yuuka album) =

Studio album by FictionJunction Yuuka
- Released: July 4, 2007
- Recorded: 2007
- Genre: Japanese pop
- Length: 57:41
- Labels: Victor Entertainment; VICL-62426 (Japan, CD); VIZL-235 (Japan, CD+DVD)
- Producer: Victor Entertainment

FictionJunction Yuuka chronology
Destination (2005)	Circus (2007)

Circus is the second album of J-pop duo FictionJunction Yuuka. It was released on July 4, 2007.

This album includes their last four singles and their b-sides (with the exception of "Yakusoku"), the previously Tsubasa Chronicle Future Soundscape IV exclusive "aikoi", as well as four brand-new songs. There are two versions of this album: the normal edition (with catalog number VICL-62426) and the limited edition (with catalog number VIZL-235). The limited edition includes a DVD with the PVs of Silly-Go-Round, Kōya Ruten and romanesque. The album debuted at #10 on the Oricon Album Charts.

== Track listing ==
All tracks are written by Yuki Kajiura.

CD (VICL-62426)
No.	Title	Length
1.	"Circus"
2.	"Aikoi" (Tsubasa Chronicle insert song)
3.	"Silly-Go-Round" (.hack//Roots opening song)
4.	"Blessing"
5.	"Kōya Ruten: Full Size Mix (荒野流転: Full Size Mix, Wilderness Vicissitude: Full Size Mix)"
6.	"Yorokobi (よろこび, Rejoicing)"
7.	"Hikaru Sabaku (光る砂漠, Shining Desert)"
8.	"Romanesque: Full Size Mix"
9.	"ピアノ (Piano)"
10.	"Rokugatsu wa Kimi no Eien (六月は君の永遠, June Is Your Eternity)"
11.	"Honoh no Tobira (焔の扉, The Door of Flames)" (Mobile Suit Gundam Seed Destiny insert song)
12.	"Angel Gate" (Song from Angel Gate:Haru no Yokan musical)

=== DVD ===
DVD (VIZL-235)
No.	Title	Length
1.	"Silly-Go-Round" (PV)
2.	"Kouya Ruten" (PV)
3.	"romanesque" (PV)
