= Destination (FictionJunction Yuuka album) =

Studio album by FictionJunction Yuuka
- Released: November 23, 2005
- Recorded: 2005
- Genre: Japanese pop
- Length: 49:02
- Labels: Victor Entertainment; VICL-61792 (Japan, CD); VIZL-159 (Japan, CD+DVD)
- Producer: Victor Entertainment

FictionJunction Yuuka chronology
Destination (2005)	Circus (2007)

Destination is the first album of J-pop duo FictionJunction Yuuka. It was released on November 23, 2005.

This album includes their first three singles and their b-sides, as well as five brand-new songs. There are two versions of this album: the normal edition (with catalog number VICL-61792) and the limited edition. The limited edition, with the catalog number VIZL-159, includes a DVD with the PV of Honoh no Tobira, its making of and a commercial for the single (15 seconds and 30 seconds).

The album, at its peak, ranked ninth on the Oricon charts.

== Track listing ==
All tracks are written by Yuki Kajiura.

CD (VICL-61792)
No.	Title	Length
1.	"I'm here" (Madlax insert song)	5:00
2.	"Destination"	4:59
3.	"Nowhere" (Madlax insert song)	3:49
4.	"Akatsuki no Kuruma (暁の車, The Wheels of Dawn)" (Mobile Suit Gundam Seed insert song)	5:04
5.	"Dare mo Inai Basho (誰もいない場所, A Place Where No One Is)"	3:22
6.	"Seiya (聖夜, Holy Night)"	5:13
7.	"Shizuka na Kotoba (しずかなことば, Quiet Words)"	4:43
8.	"Futari (ふたり, Together)"	3:02
9.	"Hitomi no Kakera (瞳の欠片, The Fragments of the Eyes)" (Madlax opening song)	4:05
10.	"Nostalgia"	5:43
11.	"Inside Your Heart" (Madlax ending song)	4:15

=== DVD ===
DVD (VIZL-159)
No.	Title	Length
1.	"Honoo no Tobira PV" (映像特典 焔の扉プロモーション映像, Eizō Tokuten Honoh no Tobira Promotion Eizō)
2.	"Making of Honoo no Tobira" (Eizō Tokuten making of Honoo no Tobira, 映像特典 making of 焔の扉)
3.	"Honoo no Tobira CF (15s and 30s)" (Eizō Tokuten Honoo no Tobira CF 30byō, 15byō, 映像特典 焔の扉CF 30秒、15秒)
