= Mobile Suit Gundam SEED: Special Edition =

2004 anime film series by Mitsuo Fukuda

- The Empty Battlefield cover

機動戦士ガンダムSEED スペシャルエディション (Kidō Senshi Gundam Seed Supesharu Edishon)
- Genre: Mecha, Action, Drama
- Created by: Hajime Yatate; Yoshiyuki Tomino
- Anime television film

The Empty Battlefield
- Directed by: Mitsuo Fukuda
- Produced by: Fumikuni Furusawa; Seiji Takeda
- Written by: Chiaki Morosawa
- Music by: Toshihiko Sahashi
- Studio: Sunrise
- Licensed by: NA: Sunrise
- Released: August 27, 2004
- Runtime: 94 minutes
- Anime television film

The Far-Away Dawn
- Directed by: Mitsuo Fukuda
- Produced by: Fumikuni Furusawa; Seiji Takeda
- Written by: Chiaki Morosawa
- Music by: Toshihiko Sahashi
- Studio: Sunrise
- Licensed by: NA: Sunrise
- Released: September 24, 2004
- Runtime: 94 minutes
- Anime television film

The Rumbling Sky
- Directed by: Mitsuo Fukuda
- Produced by: Fumikuni Furusawa; Seiji Takeda
- Written by: Chiaki Morosawa
- Music by: Toshihiko Sahashi
- Studio: Sunrise
- Licensed by: NA: Sunrise
- Released: October 22, 2004
- Runtime: 94 minutes

Mobile Suit Gundam SEED: Special Edition (機動戦士ガンダムSEED スペシャルエディション, Kidō Senshi Gundam Seed Supesharu Edishon) are three special edition movies that were released following the conclusion of Gundam SEED.

== Overview ==
These movies are a complete recap and alternate re-telling of all 50 episodes of the TV series and were first shown on television in Japan. The Special Edition episodes featured some new scenes and tweaks to previously animated scenes. The first special, The Empty Battlefield, which recapped episodes 1 to 21 of the series, was aired in two parts on Japanese TV in March 2004, followed by the next special, The Far-Away Dawn, which recapped episodes 22 to 40, in July 2004. The final special, The Rumbling Sky, which were episodes 41 to 50 aired in October 2004. While the story is overall unchanged, there are a few minor changes. In addition, several scenes were re-animated and re-dubbed.

All three movies were released on Universal Media Disc in mid-2005. Gundam SEED: Special Edition was licensed for North America by Bandai Entertainment and was released on DVDs in English, between July 11, 2005, and November 22, 2005. On October 11, 2014, at their 2014 New York Comic Con panel, Sunrise announced they will be releasing all of the Gundam franchise, including Gundam SEED: Special Edition in North America though distribution from Right Stuf Inc., beginning in Spring 2015.

In 2019, the first compilation film (The Empty Battlefield) is remastered and released for the GUNDAM "BEYOND the Cinema EXPERIENCE" TOUR, making the first of the Gundam SEED Special Edition movies to receive an HD Remaster treatment for the first time.

== Changes ==
The transition from TV to movies allowed changes to the storyline of the show to be made for the movie versions.

=== Special Edition I – The Empty Battlefield ===
- A brand new 55 second scene showing preparation for the assault on Heliopolis (shows more shots of Miguel and new shots of Rusty)
- Scenes of Kira and his friends before the going off were redone
- Newtype flash added when Mu senses Creuset for the first time
- Footage of GINN's battling with Moebius mobile armors outside the colony, has been removed.
- Debut of Cagalli is retold and a new scene of her conversation with Kira with new footage
- Athrun and Kira's first meeting during the firefight in episode 1 intercuts with scenes when they were kids instead of being shown slowly with negative colors.
- Scene of Flay emerging from the lifepod (ep 4) and hugging Kira is redone and retold. Also a new 30 second scene of Sai and Flay conversing has been added
- The scene with Rau and Athrun discussing the Strike's pilot is reduced to a 10-second flashback and is inserted into the scene where Athrun is lying and thinking about the loss of Rusty and Miguel
- The Archangel's heading to Artemis and the Battle of Artemis footage had been removed.
- Athrun's shower scene (ep 8) is lengthened and intercut with scenes of his parents; and the scene following this (his discovery of Lacus' disappearance) is completely redone and moved to be ahead of hatch opening sequence of Lacus's life pod.
- Backstory from the first clip show is never told.
- New 25 second clip of Lacus trip to the cafeteria on board the Archangel
- The scene of Rau and Mu taking the opportunity to attack during the time that Kira is transferring Lacus to Athrun only for Lacus to order Rau to stand down and withdraw is removed.
- A newly animated sequence of Kira having sex with Flay is shown cut between Strike's first battle in the desert.
- Cagalli's bath sequence is changed from a bath to a shower instead, probably for fanservice.
- The scenes of Dearka and Yzak assisting Andrew Waltfeld during his final attack on the Archangel have been removed.

=== Special Edition II – The Far-Away Dawn ===
- Kira's battles with Marco Morassim are reduced to a few frames
- The scene where Cagalli and Athrun formally introduce themselves to each other has been moved into a flashback scene during the Zala Team's attack on the Archangel.
- There are only a few seconds separating Nicol's death from the next battle between Kira and Athrun.
- Tolle's death scene is redone and is more gruesome than the TV Series version.
- A new scene is added where Kisaka comes to get Cagalli after the Archangel sends a distress signal to Orb after the battle between Kira and Athrun.
- When Athrun meets with Lacus in the theatre, the gunmen attempting to assassinate her are removed.
- The scene where Erica Simmons shows that she has rebuilt the Strike and equipped it with Orb's OS system and Mu's decision to pilot it has been removed, instead it shows Mu piloting the rebuilt Strike during the Orb arc without any explanation of how he received it.
- Most of the Orb arc is shown with battle scenes being spliced together to create enlarged confrontations.
- The footage of the Le Creuset team observing the Battle of Orb has been removed.
- The song "Akatsuki no Kuruma" (暁の車; "Cart of Dawn") by FictionJunction YUUKA is played in full towards the end of the movie instead of the shortened TV edit.

=== Special Edition III – The Rumbling Sky ===
- Rau's face is shown in the laboratory sequence.
- Kira has a talk with Lacus about how he isn't sure if he wasn't meant to be born in the world after he found out the truth from Rau. Lacus responds by telling Kira he belongs to the world as long as he is born and exist in the world and his birth has made her a much happier woman, she then tells him she wants him to stay with her.
- In the final battle at GENESIS, Athrun shoots down a GuAIZ Experimental Firearms Type and a CGUE D.E.E.P. Arms from SEED-MSV.
- Clotho is killed by Dearka instead of Yzak.
- Mu La Flaga's battered helmet is removed from the debris.

== Ending and insert songs ==
Ending songs (in order):

- Anna ni Issho Datta no ni (あんなに一緒だったのに; We used to be so close together) by See-Saw
- Akatsuki no Kuruma (The Wheels of Dawn) by FictionJunction Yuuka
- FIND THE WAY by Mika Nakashima

Insert songs:

- Shizuka na Yoru ni (静かな夜に; In the Quiet Night) by Rie Tanaka (English version by Jillian Michaels)
- Zips by T.M.Revolution
- Meteor by T.M.Revolution
- Akatsuki no Kuruma by FictionJunction Yuuka
- Mizu no Akashi (水の証; Token of Water) by Rie Tanaka (English version by Jillian Michaels)
- INVOKE by T.M.Revolution
