= Nancy Novotny =

American actress

- Born: Baltimore, Maryland
- Occupation: Voice Actress/Radio DJ/Script Writer

Nancy Novotny is an American radio personality and voice actress working with ADV Films and Seraphim Digital, known for her roles in English-language dubbed anime, such as Yomi in Azumanga Daioh, Yuka in Elfen Lied and Madlax in Madlax. She co-hosts a weekly show on Rice Radio in Houston, Texas.

== History ==
She got into the voice acting industry after being influenced by Ranma ½, which resulted in auditions for A.D. Vision before being accepted for her first role in Azumanga Daioh as Yomi.

== Filmography ==
=== Anime ===
- 009-1 - Freya
- Air Gear - Mari Tomita (a.k.a. Ton-chan)
- AKB0048 - Haruna Kojima the 8th, Mother Motomiya
- Area 88 (TV) - Kitri Parveneh
- Azumanga Daioh - Koyomi "Yomi" Mizuhara (debut)
- Best Student Council - Sayuri Hida
- Blade of the Phantom Master - Sando/Chun Hyang
- Brynhildr in the Darkness - Kashiwagi
- Coyote Ragtime Show - July
- D.N.Angel - Ritsuko Fukuda
- Dog & Scissors - Sakura Honda
- Elfen Lied - Yuka
- From the New World - Masayo Komatsuzaki
- Full Metal Panic? Fumoffu - Ren Mikihara
- Girls und Panzer - Oryo/Takeko Nogami
- Godannar - Sakura
- Hakkenden: Eight Dogs of the East - Ayane Saiki, Yukihime (Snow Princess)
- Hamatora - Koneko
- Kaleido Star - Mia Guillem
- Little Busters! - Miyuki Koshiki (Ep. 25), Rei Kawagoe, Ami (Ep. 24)
- Maburaho - Raika Nario
- Madlax - Madlax
- Magical Warfare - Momoka Shijou
- Majestic Prince - Mayu
- Maria Holic - Ayari Shiki
- Moeyo Ken (TV) - Kaoru Okita
- Momo: The Girl God of Death - Daniel
- Nanaka 6/17 - Chie Kazamatsuri
- Peacemaker - Hana
- Phi Brain: Puzzle of God - Eve Gram
- Problem Children are Coming from Another World, aren't they? - Asuka Kudou
- Rozen Maiden Zurücksplen - Nori Sakurada
- Sister Princess - Rin Rin
- Tactics - Reiko
- Tamako Market - Hinako Kitashirakawa
- The Super Dimension Fortress Macross - Vanessa Laird
- The World God Only Knows - Miyako Terada
- Tokyo Magnitude 8.0 - Mayu, Hina Kusakabe (Ep. 6)
- Tsuritama - Sakura Usami
- UFO Ultramaiden Valkyrie - Hydra, Akidora (Akidra)
- Upotte!! - L85A1 (Elle)
- Utawarerumono - Gura
- Wandaba Style - Ayame Akimo
- Venus Versus Virus - Shizu
- Yugo the Negotiator - Mariko
- Yumeria - Nanase Senjou

== Production credits ==
=== ADR Script ===
- Muv-Luv Alternative: Total Eclipse
- Tamako Market
