= Yū Mizushima =

Japanese actor and narrator (born 1956)

- 水島 裕
- Born: Kenji Noda; January 18, 1956 (age 70); Tokyo, Japan
- Education: Nihon University
- Occupations: Actor; voice actor; narrator
- Years active: 1970–present
- Agent: 81 Produce

Yū Mizushima (水島 裕, Mizushima Yū; born Kenji Noda (野田 憲司, Noda Kenji) on January 18, 1956) is a Japanese actor, voice actor and narrator.

He is known for being the Japanese dubbing voice for Sammo Hung, and is also the Japanese dub voice of Wakko Warner.

In the 1980s, He proved to be a popular choice for many Japanese animation studios for the roles of male heart-throbs in many shojo anime.

In May 2020, Mizushima announced he would take a hiatus in order to undergo vocal cord polyp surgery.

== Filmography ==
=== Television animation ===
1970s

- Chojin Sentai Barattack (1977) – Mac
- Choudenji Machine Voltes V (1977) – Young Ragooru
- Galaxy Express 999 (1978) – Beethoven
- Dokaben (1979) – Tomoaki Takashiro
- Hana no Ko Lunlun (1979) – Serge Flora (Selge)

1980s

- Space Emperor God Sigma (1980) – Kajio
- Beast King GoLion (1981) – Isamu Kurogane ("Lance")
- Six God Combination Godmars (1981) – Mars/Takeru Myoujin
- Tokimeki Tonight (1982-1983) – Shun Makabe
- Creamy Mami, the Magic Angel (1983) – Toshio Otomo
- Persia, the Magic Fairy (1984) – Riki Muroi
- Magical Emi, the Magic Star (1985) as Shou Yuuki
- Obake no Q-Taro (1985) – Shinichi
- Pastel Yumi, the Magic Idol (1986) as Kyouhei Misawa
- Saint Seiya (1986) – Lizard Misty, Sid, Bud
- Tekken Chinmi (1988) – Raochu
- Ulysses 31 (1988) – Telemachos

1990s

- Akazukin Chacha (1994) – Franken-chan
- Detective Conan (1996) – Toshihiko Takasugi (ep 18)
- Hakugei: Legend of the Moby Dick (1997) – General Ho
- Kindaichi Case Files (1999) – Akashi Sudo (ep 100)

2000s

- .hack//Intermezzo (2002) – Male Heavyblade
- L/R: Licensed by Royalty (2003) – Rocky
- Requiem from the Darkness (2003) – Gunhachirou (Momosuke's brother)
- Submarine Super 99 (2003) – Gorô Oki
- Fullmetal Alchemist (2004) – Scar's Brother
- Kaiketsu Zorori (2004) – Goburu
- Madlax (2004) – Luciano
- Yu-Gi-Oh! Duel Monsters (2004) – Rare Hunter (ep 68); Light Mask (ep 70–74); Bobasa
- Naruto (2005) – Mondai (ep 161)
- Tsubasa Chronicle (2005) – Sakura's Father
- Black Cat (2006) – Doctor (Kanzaki)
- Pocket Monsters: Diamond and Pearl (2009) – Gen/Riley

2010s

- Saint Seiya Omega (2013) – Equuleus Subaru
- Parasyte (2014) – Takeshi Hirokawa
- Kirakira PreCure a la Mode (2017) – Elder
- One Piece (2017) – Napoleon, Zeus, Prometheus, Kawamatsu,Misery

2020s

- Oda Cinnamon Nobunaga (2020) – Ichiko's father
- Dragon Quest: The Adventure of Dai (2021) – Brokeena

=== OVA ===
- Fire Tripper (1986) – Shukomaru
- Guyver: Out of Control (1986) – Sho Fukamachi/Guyver
- Black Magic M-66 (1987) – Leakey
- Devilman (1987) – Ryo Asuka
- Digital Devil Story (1987) – Akemi Nakajima
- Spirit Warrior (1988) – Tenshu
- Legend of the Galactic Heroes (1989) – Neithardt Müller
- Super Mario World: Mario to Yoshi no Bōken Land (1991) – Luigi
- Black Jack (1998) – Yasuhiko Shirabyoshi

=== Theatrical animation ===
- Kimagure Orange Road (1985) – Kyōsuke Kasuga
- Super Mario Bros.: The Great Mission to Rescue Princess Peach! (1986) – Luigi
- The Rose of Versailles: I'll Love You – Long – I Live (1987) – Andre
- Saint Seiya: The Movie (1987) – Orion Jäger
- Neo Tokyo (1987) – Tsutomo Sugioka
- Cyborg 009 Vs. Devilman (2015) – Chang Changku/006
- Crayon Shin-chan: Burst Serving! Kung Fu Boys ~Ramen Rebellion~ (2018)

=== Tokusatsu ===
- Juken Sentai Gekiranger (2007) – Master Elehung Kam Po (eps. 10 - 12, 18, 23, 28, 32, 36, 49)
- Zyuden Sentai Kyoryuger (2013) – Sorrowful Knight Aigaron (eps. 1 - 11, 13, 16 - 17, 19, 21 - 26, 28 - 30, 32 - 34, 36 - 39, 42 - 46) (voice), President (ep. 28, 44) (actor)
- Zyuden Sentai Kyoryuger vs. Go-Busters: The Great Dinosaur Battle! Farewell Our Eternal Friends (2014) – Sorrowful Knight Aigaron
- Kaettekita Zyuden Sentai Kyoryuger 100 Years After (2014) – Jealousy Knight Hoshigaron

=== Dubbing ===
==== Live-action ====
- Sammo Hung
  - Enter the Fat Dragon – Ah Lung
  - By Hook or by Crook – Fatso
  - Encounters of the Spooky Kind – Bold Cheung
  - Project A – Fei
  - Winners and Sinners – "Teapot"
  - Wheels on Meals – Moby
  - Heart of Dragon – Danny / Dodo Fung
  - My Lucky Stars – "Eric" / "Kidstuff" / "Fastbuck" / "Chi Koo Choi"
  - Twinkle, Twinkle Lucky Stars – "Eric" / "Kidstuff" / "Fastbuck" / "Chi Koo-choi"
  - Lucky Stars Go Places – "Eric" / "Kidstuff" / "Fastbuck" / "Chi Koo-choi"
  - Millionaires Express – Ching Fong-Tin
  - Eastern Condors – Tung Ming-sun
  - Mr. Vampire III – Hung
  - Dragons Forever – Wong Fei-Hung / Luke Wang
  - Lai Shi, China's Last Eunuch – Liu Lai Shi's teacher
  - Island of Fire – Fatty John Liu Hsi Chia
  - Martial Law – Sammo Law
  - The Legend of Zu – Grandmaster White Brows
  - Around the World in 80 Days (2008 TV Tokyo edition) – Wong Fei Hung / Tiger #2
  - Dragon Squad – Kong Long
  - SPL: Sha Po Lang – Wong Po
  - Three Kingdoms: Resurrection of the Dragon – Luo Ping'an
  - Ip Man 2 – Hung Chun-nam
  - A Simple Life – Director Hung
  - The Last Tycoon – Huang Jinrong
  - The Bodyguard – Ding Hu
- Matthew Perry
  - Friends – Chandler Bing
  - Three to Tango – Oscar Novak
  - The Whole Nine Yards – Nicholas "Oz" Oseransky
  - The Whole Ten Yards – Nicholas "Oz" Oseransky
- Mark Hamill
  - Star Wars Episode IV: A New Hope (1985 NTV edition) – Luke Skywalker
  - Star Wars Episode V: The Empire Strikes Back (1986 NTV edition) – Luke Skywalker
  - Star Wars Episode VI: Return of the Jedi (1988 NTV edition) – Luke Skywalker
  - Jay and Silent Bob Strike Back – Cocknocker
- 3 Idiots – Chatur Ramalingam (Omi Vaidya)
- 8 Simple Rules – Paul Hennessy (John Ritter)
- Bewitched – Ritchie (Jason Schwartzman)
- Big Trouble in Little China – Wang Chi (Dennis Dun)
- Casualties of War – Private Max Eriksson (Michael J. Fox)
- Enter the Fat Dragon – Thor (Wong Jing)
- Everything Everywhere All at Once – Waymond Wang (Ke Huy Quan)
- Good Morning, Vietnam – Edward Garlick (Forest Whitaker)
- The Karate Kid (1988 TV Asahi edition) – Daniel LaRusso (Ralph Macchio)
- Mars Attacks! – Jason Stone (Michael J. Fox)
- Spider-Man 2 – Mr. Aziz (Aasif Mandvi)
- T. J. Hooker – Officer Vince Romano (Adrian Zmed)

==== Animation ====
- Animaniacs – Wakko Warner
- Johnny Test – Johnny Test
- The Little Mermaid – Harold the Seahorse
- Mighty Orbots - Rob Simmons
- Sitting Ducks – Bill

== Singing ==
- Warrior of Love Rainbowman both 1972 and 1982 openings, 1972 first ending (as Kenji Yasunaga)

== Awards ==
Year	Award ceremony	Award	Result
2020	14th Seiyu Awards	Kei Tomiyama Memorial Award	Won
