= Sacred Seven =

2011 Japanese anime series

- セイクリッドセブン
- Genre: Action, Science fiction
- Created by: Hajime Yatate
- Developed by: Shin Yoshida
- Directed by: Yoshimitsu Ōhashi
- Music by: Toshihiko Sahashi
- Country of origin: Japan
- Original language: Japanese
- No. of episodes: 12

Production
- Producers: Keiichi Matsumura; Hiroko Kuwazono; Toshihiro Maeda
- Production companies: Sunrise; Bandai Visual; Hakuhodo DY Media Partners; Mainichi Broadcasting System

Original release
- Network: MBS, TV Kanagawa, TV Aichi, Tokyo MX, Teletama
- Release: July 3 – September 18, 2011

Related
- Manga
- Written by: Kyōtarō Azuma
- Published by: Kodansha
- Magazine: Monthly Shōnen Sirius
- Original run: July 26, 2011 – August 25, 2012
- Volumes: 4
- Anime film

Sacred Seven: Shirogane no Tsubasa
- Directed by: Yoshimitsu Ōhashi
- Written by: Yuniko Ayana
- Music by: Toshihiko Sahashi
- Studio: Sunrise
- Released: January 7, 2012
- Runtime: 60 minutes

Sacred Seven (セイクリッドセブン, Seikuriddo Sebun), is a 2011 Japanese science fiction anime television series produced by Sunrise under the direction of Yoshimitsu Ōhashi. Script supervisor is Shin Yoshida with mechanical designs by Ippei Gyōbu. The series began broadcasting in Japan starting July 3, 2011, on the Mainichi Broadcasting System and later will be rebroadcast by TV Kanagawa, TV Aichi, Tokyo MX, and Teletama. The anime was originally licensed by Bandai Entertainment for streaming, but they shut down in 2012. Following the 2012 closure of Bandai Entertainment, Sunrise announced at Otakon 2013, that Sentai Filmworks has rescued Sacred Seven, along with a handful of other former BEI titles.

== Plot ==
Alma Tandōji lives a lonely and solitary life in a certain port city within the Kantō region. One day, he is approached by Ruri Aiba who asks for his help, for the power of the Sacred Seven which resides within Alma. However, Alma turns her away as in the past, Alma had hurt people with that very power. Since that moment, he had foresworn it. But when the peaceful city is attacked by a monster, Alma reluctantly decides to use the Sacred Seven. However, his powers go berserk and the situation becomes even more dire. At that moment, Ruri comes to his aid by inserting a sacred stone made using her jewel necklace and transforms him to his true form.

== Characters ==
Alma Tandōji (丹童子 アルマ, Tandōji Aruma)
Voiced by: Takuma Terashima
The main protagonist of Sacred Seven. He was born with the power of Sacred Seven from his mother's exposure. A few years ago before the series, he lost control of his powers and harmed a lot of people. Therefore, he has been living in solitude ever since. Alma can only control his true powers if Ruri inserts a special Lightstone in him. He has access to all seven powers (hence the name 'Sacred Seven'). It has also been stated that he has the highest level of Sacred Seven that even surpasses Kijima. Alma used to have a crystal that belonged to his mother that was supposed to suppress his powers, but it was thrown into the river by a bully which caused the incident. He has been looking for it ever since, hence developed a habit of looking for rocks. He became a member of the Geology Club at the same time Kagami and Ruri did. In episode 11, it was revealed that Kenmi caused the incident to test Alma's powers. Also the revelation that he met Ruri when he was little and realizes how important she is to him.
Ruri Aiba (藍羽 ルリ, Aiba Ruri)
Voiced by: Megumi Nakajima
The main heroine of Sacred Seven. She is the daughter of a billionaire noble family who were killed by a Darkstone. She created Aiba Foundation to combat against the Darkstones. She is a Lightstone that has the ability to turn a gem into a Lightstone and insert it into Alma to control his true powers. She became the chairman of Alma's school (where she heavily renovated the school) and a member of the Geology Club to keep in contact with Alma. She has a twin sister named Aoi who also survived the Darkstone aftermath, but was crystallized. Her whole foundation is occupied with female maids. She has feelings for Alma which is shown throughout the series.
Aoi Aiba (藍羽 葵, Aiba Aoi)
Voiced by: Sayuri Yahagi
Ruri's sister, she had protected herself with a Crystal like stone when Kenmi killed her parents, since then she had been sleeping inside this crystal. It seems she has feelings for Kagami. In episode 12 she is shown her waking up and alive.
Makoto Kagami (鏡 誠, Kagami Makoto)
Voiced by: Miyu Irino
Ruri's personal butler and field commander for the Aiba Foundation. At 18, he graduated from Harvard and is enrolled in Alma's school for his convenience. He became class president and a member of the Geology Club when he enrolled. He has his own personal mech to fight Darkstones called the Engagement Suit.
Wakana Itō (伊藤 若菜, Itō Wakana)
Voiced by: Kanae Itō
A childhood friend of Alma after the incident. She is the only person that is not afraid of Alma despite the rumors. She's the head of the Geology Club. She has an obsession of finding good rocks, a trait that she passed on to Alma.
Naito Kijima (輝島 ナイト, Kijima Naito)
Voiced by: Nobuhiko Okamoto
He is the main rival and sub-antagonist of Alma. He is the same being as Alma except that he overuses his power, causing his condition to deteriorate unless it is treated with a vaccine. He can alter objects around his surroundings and Darkstones into his weapons. He truly wants to be free even if he has to fight the Aiba Foundation for it. He has a bitter grudge against his former superior, Kenmi. He considers Alma as a higher class than himself. His companion, Feicui, takes care of him.
Liu Feicui (劉 翡翠, Rau Fei Zōi)
Voiced by: Iori Nomizu
Another lightstone like Ruri who escaped with Kijima from Kenmi. 12 years old. He uses his blood to create vaccines for Kijima due to the overuse of his powers. He had a brother named Zero who lost control of himself, until he and Kijima saved his sanity. However, his brother was killed by Kenmi shortly after, causing Feicui to go on a rampage.
Yūji Kenmi (研美 悠士, Kenmi Yūji)
Voiced by: Katsuyuki Konishi
The main antagonist of the series. He is a scientist for a private organization, Kenmi Group, that researches the capabilities of Sacred Seven. He was the one that experimented on Naito and was his former superior. He created a way to utilize the Sacred Seven power with an artificial crystal. However, its powers are limited to a certain extent. After Alma and Ruri's confrontation with Naito, it is revealed that he's performing illegal experiments on humans with the Seven's powers in secret. In episode 11, it was revealed that he caused the incident with Alma. With Zero's lightstone, he was able to become stronger. His armor is called Cyclops.
Arachne (Sacred Parser)
Voiced by: Ai Takabe
Kenmi's personal secretary and possesses an artificial crystal to transform into an armor called Rabbit. She has a tendency to complain due to her lackadaisical nature and behaves in a manner akin to a child, however she is a very skilled operative. This is demonstrated aptly in her encounters with Naito, who she has fought to standstill on two separate occasions.
Liu Hongyu (劉 紅玉, Rau Hon Yū)
Voiced by: Hirofumi Nojima
Feicui's older brother and another Darkstone victim of Kenmi. He was the one responsible for the death of Ruri's parents and Kagami Sr. Kenmi altered body with armor and try to control his mind, which was unsuccessful at points, and turned him in to the Darkstone monster Zero, an armored fiery melting Balrog of ash. In episode 11, Feicui cured him, only to be killed by Kenmi.

Other Darkstones

The Darkstones are creatures that base their bodies on various mythological figures. In episode 10 it is revealed that they were formed from hearts sacrificed to the Aztec god Quetzalcoatl.

- Perseus: Appears in episode 1. Powers include a hooked sword, stone lasers from the Medusa head for the left hand, super speed, and a torso mouth.
- Medusa: Appears in episode 1. Powers include high jumping, a scorpion tail, head lasers, and snake tentacles.
- Orochi: Appears in episode 2. Powers include wind manipulation, flight, and six dragon tentacles that launch cyclones and fire balls from the mouths.
- Centipedes: Appear in episodes 2 and 3. Powers include flight, sharp teeth, burrowing, and self destruction.
- Basilisk: Appears in episode 4. Powers include stone touch conversion, speed, and dividing.
- Balor: Appears in episode 4. Powers include levitation, body spikes and self destruction.
- Tsuchigumo: Appears in episode 5. Powers include summoning fast lice, earth manipulation, and eight jaws.
- Zero: Appears in episodes 6, 7, and 11. Powers include speed, a high body temperature, flames from the head, and a whip tail.
- Fujin: Appears in episode 9. Powers include speed, foot oriented martial arts, and high jumping.
- Raijin: Appears in episode 9. Powers include a whip tongue, absorbing mouth, mouth flames and lasers, and a mouth in each foot.
- Pyramid: Appears in episode 12. Powers include levitation, body lasers, and gravity manipulation.
- Kappa: Appears in the movie. Its only known power is water manipulation.

== Media ==
=== CDs ===
The music for Sacred Seven is composed by Toshihiko Sahashi. An original studio album, Hand Made Soulmate (はんどめいど☆そうるめいと, Hando Meido Sourumeito), was released July 20, 2011. The album features eight songs all which are sung by Aiba Maid Group S7 (藍羽メイド隊S7, Aiba Meido-tai S7). The album was released on October 5, 2011, Flying Dog will release the soundtrack for the series titled Sacred Seven Original Soundtrack. The soundtrack includes the TV version of the opening and ending theme song, as well as insert songs and background music. A drama character album was released on September 7, 2011, titled Fragment of S7 Alma Tandouji × Ruri Aiba, which features songs sung by Alma Tandouji (Takuma Terashima) and Ruri Aiba (Megumi Nakajima) and a short audio drama. On October 5, another drama character album will be released featuring Makoto Kagami (Miyu Irino) and Aiba Maid Tai S7.

The anime's opening theme song, "stone cold", was performed by FictionJunction. It reached number 16 on the Oricon charts.

== Episode list ==
No.	Title	Directed by	Written by	Original air date
1	"Awakening of the Stone"; Transliteration: "Ishi no Mezame" (Japanese: イシの目覚め)	Kazuo Miyake	Shin Yoshida	July 3, 2011
A massive stone abomination is seen destroying a ship off the coast of a Japanese city. The event is witnessed from afar by a young man named Alma Tandoji, who goes into violent convulsions after being exposed to a mysterious light. Later that day, after some odd events at school Alma is approached by a young girl named Ruri. She begs Alma to help her stop the creature that tore up the ship and others like it, calling them "Dark Stones". However, when her butler begins revealing the info he has on Alma he snaps. In particular it was revealed at the age of 14, Alma was attacked by a group of thugs looking to make a victim of him. However, Alma snapped and brutally beat them all to near-death states requiring an eight month recovery for each victim. For this reason he was suspended for a number of years. Alma promptly scares off Ruri and her butler with his sheer power after this is revealed. Meanwhile, the abomination from before begins attacking the city. Alma decides to investigate when he realizes the creature is making his way towards the location of a young woman who had invited him to go on a trip to a museum (which he planned to decline). Alma tracks down the beast and encounters it just as it is about to devour Ruri. In a fit of rage, Alma yanks the Dark Stone off Ruri and transforms into a Dark Stone himself. Violently, Alma begins beating the creature to death, even throwing it clean over several city blocks. As he finishes killing the creature, Ruri's butler shows and attempts to execute the "uncontrollable" Alma. However Ruri defends him and attempts to reason with Alma. Nearly being beaten in the process, Ruri succeeds and gets Alma to undo his form. Unfortunately the other head of the beast that Alma destroyed tracks down and devours a precious gem giving it vast amounts of power while Alma was preoccupied. This leads Ruri to perform an unusual ritual causing Alma's power to activate in a different form. Using his newfound power, Alma destroys the second head.
2	"Ruri's Sky-Blue Bond"; Transliteration: "Ruri-iro no Kizuna" (Japanese: ルリ色の絆)	Kōichirō Sōtome	Shin Yoshida	July 10, 2011
Kagami reveals to Alma the reason why Ruri fights the Darkstones. Wakana reveals how she first met Alma. Meanwhile, a Darkstone carried by the US Army creates a storm in the Pacific Ocean to cause havoc and is heading to Japan.
3	"Crazy Night"; Transliteration: "Kureijī Naito" (Japanese: クレイジーナイト)	Akira Toba	Shin Yoshida	July 17, 2011
Ruri returns from London after buying a fine grade gemstone for Alma to use. During trip a routine trip home, she and her convoy is attacked by Naito, the one who caused the Darkstone incidents. Kenmi reveals his reasons of his research on the Sacred Seven and information on his history on Naito.
4	"Oni at the School Festival"; Transliteration: "Gakuen-sai no Oni" (Japanese: 学園祭のオニ)	Naotaka Hayashi	Masahiro Hikokubo	July 24, 2011
Ruri and Alma participate for the school fair. However, things turn worse when a few of Naito's Darkstone snakes cause problems. Wakana converses with Ruri to know her a little more.
5	"The Mirror in Kagami's Heart"; Transliteration: "Kokoro no Kagami" (Japanese: 心のカガミ)	Yasuo Muroi	Kiyoko Yoshimura	July 31, 2011
Tandoji and the Geology Club went to a camp. There, Kagami and Tandoji found a darkstone and informed Ruri about it. They managed to defeat it without the geology club members knowing.
6	"One More Night, One More Naito"; Transliteration: "Wan Moa Naito" (Japanese: ワンモアナイト)	Yū Nobuta	Shin Yoshida	August 7, 2011
Ruri invites Alma to eat lunch with her. Alma feels very annoyed by Ruri. Naito kidnapped Ruri to get a serum that will help him control the darkstone in him.
7	"A Dark Side of the Truth"; Transliteration: "Shinjitsu no Yoshiashi" (Japanese: 真実のヨシアシ)	Akira Toba	Shin Yoshida	August 14, 2011
Alma and Ruri hears the dark truth of Kenmi's so-called research from Naito.
8	"With All My Heart"; Transliteration: "Magokoro o Komete" (Japanese: マゴコロを込めて)	Kōichirō Sōtome	Yuniko Ayana	August 21, 2011
Confused as to whose side tells the truth, Ruri and Alma reflects on how they've become ignorant with what's really happening. Kagami visits an old acquaintance to look for further evidence concerning Kenmi's research facility, he was advised about the danger of trying to investigate Kenmi as he can eliminate them if they tried to get into his way. Ruri visits Alma in his house and asked him to form a contract but Alma rejects it, Seeing the relationship between the two in turmoil, A partially fixed Hellbrick asked the two to go to Kamakura to retrieve a stone needed to completely fix him or he will die within 3 days but for the stone to glow Ruri and Alma must join hands. The two went to a ramen shop and conflict arises when Ruri becomes frustrated of Alma's carefree attitude, Ruri finally manages to tell Alma her worries which later cools down the tension. Alma proceeds to take Ruri to his hometown where he used to live with his mother and has told her the pain he endured as a result of having his powers, Ruri told him their prior meeting when they were young after Alma saved her from a falling construction material on their school which he no longer remember. With the stone still not glowing, the two spent their time on the beach and then went back to Ruri's Mansion only to find out that Hellbrick has already been fixed and that the date was just set to improve their relationship.
9	"The Soul of a Rolling Stone"; Transliteration: "Tenseki Suruishi" (Japanese: 転石するイシ)	Yasuo Muroi	Kiyoko Yoshimura	August 29, 2011
10	"Memory of Aoi"; Transliteration: "Aoi Kioku" (Japanese: アオイ記憶)	Kazuo Miyake	Kiyoko Yoshimura	September 3, 2011
Ruri's sister is released from her crystal shell in a false death state. Ruri explained what happened to Aoi 5 years ago on Christmas to Alma.
11	"Kenmi's Sharpened Blade"; Transliteration: "Toga Reta Yaiba" (Japanese: 研がれたヤイバ)	Akira Toba	Kiyoko Yoshimura	September 10, 2011
Ruri was taken in to custody by Kenmi. Alma, Kagami and the entire Aiba Foundation declared war against Kenmi Group and rescued Ruri. Naito and Fei plans to use the vaccine on Zero to retain his mind and control over his Darkstone powers.
12	"Sacred Seven"; Transliteration: "Seikuriddo Sebun" (Japanese: セイクリッドセブン)	Yoshimitsu Ōhashi	Kiyoko Yoshimura	September 17, 2011
