= List of Madlax characters =

Madlax (マドラックス, Madorakkusu) is a 26-episode anime television series that was produced in 2004 by the Bee Train animation studio. According to the composer of the series, Yuki Kajiura, the director Kōichi Mashimo created a list of brief descriptions of every recurring character for her to base their respective musical themes upon. She refers to this list as "Mashimo Menu" and commented that the director's descriptions provide deeper insight into the characters.

== Main characters ==
=== Margaret Burton ===
Margaret Burton (マーガレット・バートン, Māgaretto Bāton), born on 14 July 1992, is a clumsy, absent-minded 19-year-old girl who attends an elite college for aristocratic families' children in Nafrece. Her memories of her own life are limited to its last twelve years, the word "Madlax", and vague recollections of something important connected to an unusual "picture book" she possesses.

Margaret is ultimately the central character of the story, as she is the person who has the Gift, a mysterious ability to alter the reality. Twelve years ago, she and the person who later became known as Carrossea Doon, survived a plane crash in Gazth-Sonika and interrupted the stand-off between Friday Monday, who unintentionally caused the accident while accessing the Sanctuary (see Terminology), and Colonel Richard Burton, Margaret's father. Although Burton was victorious, Monday, with his last strength, chanted the Words of Awakening and put him into trance, forcing to shoot his own daughter. Protecting herself, Margaret shot her father and, to flee from the guilt, used her Gift to split herself into three personae: one who retained the Gift (Margaret herself), one who took the sin of patricide upon herself (Madlax), and one who kept the memories of this (Laetitia). Since that moment, the person known as Margaret Burton became but a third of her former self, still possessing the Gift, but having lost all memories.

The "picture book" she has is Secondari, the second of the Holy Books instrumental for using the Gift. Margaret believes that it was given to her by her father, though she cannot understand the language it is written in, or the reason for some of its pages being covered with blood. The red shoes that help her remember about Secondari are an obvious homage to Noir, where a similar pair is worn by Kirika Yuumura.

- Mashimo Menu musical theme title: Picture Book, Blood, and Deep-Sea Fish
- Voiced by: Houko Kuwashima (Japanese); Luci Christian (English)

=== Madlax ===
Madlax (マドラックス, Madorakkusu) is an exceptionally charismatic and attractive young woman, who is at the same time the best mercenary agent in Gazth-Sonika with 98% mission success rate. Like Margaret, she does not remember anything before twelve years ago (though she has not lost her language knowledge), except for the word "Madlax", which she has adopted as her code name, and a brief flashback of a gun in her hands and her father walking away—Madlax believes that her father is still alive and fighting somewhere in Gazth-Sonika.

While she is the best fighter in the country, easily able to dodge bullets with her Gun Kata fighting style and take down a small army all by herself. She fights only to bring a rapid end to all fighting and, when Vanessa Rene shows her that Enfant is behind the war, Madlax immediately seeks to destroy it, no matter the personal cost.

Madlax is the second persona of the former Margaret Burton, the one who took upon herself the sin of patricide, and her supernatural fighting powers may have been influenced by this. Her non-human nature becomes apparent towards the end of the series, when her left lung completely heals overnight after being pierced by a bullet. Madlax has the missing page from Margaret's Secondari.

- Mashimo Menu title: The Gatekeeper of Hell is All Alone
- Voiced by: Sanae Kobayashi (Japanese); Nancy Novotny (English)

=== Vanessa Rene ===
Vanessa Rene (ヴァネッサ・レネ) is Margaret's former neighbor and tutor, who has received a university education in IT and is currently a manager for Bookwald Industries. Some reviewers have estimated her age as early thirties.

Her parents got mixed up with Gazth-Sonikan politics when the war broke out and were subsequently executed, therefore Vanessa's goal is to uncover the real reasons of the conflict.

Being a strong-willed and self-confident woman, Vanessa travels directly to Gazth-Sonika after she discovers that Bookwald not only invests into its demilitarized zone but also sells weapons to both warring factions and, moreover, is a part of Enfant syndicate itself. In Gazth-Sonika, Madlax is appointed as her bodyguard so it is Vanessa who links the two personae of the original Margaret Burton back together.

She is shot by Limelda after protecting Madlax, and dies from her injuries.

- Mashimo Menu title: Gatekeeper of Happiness
- Voiced by: Satsuki Yukino (Japanese); Kelly Manison (English)

=== Elenore Baker ===
Elenore Baker (エリノア・ベイカー, Erinoa Beikā) is Margaret's maidservant, wholly devoted to caring for her "miss". Elenore's family has served the Burtons for generations, so she considers it her duty to protect the absent-minded and clumsy Margaret from anything remotely dangerous—to the point of researching all her classmates' backgrounds. Her devotion and persistence helped her to graduate from school years ahead of the rest and later, become an expert in hand to hand combat.

In the final arc of the series, she is shot by soldiers while trying to rescue Margaret. While, with determination, she gets to reunite with her "miss", she eventually dies of her wounds.

Elenore holds the distinction of being one of the final 8 in 2004 Anime Saimoe Tournament.

- Mashimo Menu title: Everyday Gatekeeper
- Voiced by: Ai Uchikawa (Japanese); Kira Vincent-Davis (English)

=== Friday Monday ===
Friday Monday (フライデー・マンデー, Furaidē Mandē) is the enigmatic founder and head of the Enfant organization. Very little is known about his past before 1999, when he used his Gift to open the Door of Truth in a failed attempt to plunge the world into a total war, which, as he believes, is its natural state.

His attempt was foiled by Colonel Richard Burton, so the conflict only broke out locally, in the country where the ritual was held and where the Enfant HQ was later situated—in Gazth-Sonika. To repeat the ritual and complete what he has started, Monday has been ever since searching for the two missing Holy Books (he managed to keep Firstari) and another person with a strong Gift, as he is no longer able to use his own, allegedly, because the right half of his face (which he always hides it behind a mask) is disfigured by Burton's bullet. Although it is not stated explicitly within the series, according to Kōichi Mashimo's vision, Monday was once a talented artist.

- Mashimo Menu title: The Gatekeeper of Heaven Smiles
- Voiced by: Masashi Ebara (Japanese); Mike Kleinhenz (English)

=== Carrossea Doon ===
Carrossea Doon (カロッスア・ドゥーン, Karossua Dōn) is officially an independent contract worker for Bookwald Industries, although, in reality, he is one of Enfant's best operatives and the right-hand man of Friday Monday himself. Carrossea is smart and resourceful and he often exploits his position and powers in order to search for clues about his past, for he, just like Madlax and Margaret, doesn't remember anything before twelve years ago.

During the incident in Gazth-Sonika, Carrossea, then known as Poupee, and Margaret were the sole survivors of the plane crash (maybe because both possessed the Gift). He rapidly fell in love with and vowed to protect her, therefore, when Margaret interrupted the stand-off between her father and Monday, Carrossea-Poupee has to cover her with his own body from a stray bullet and died on the spot. However, his rather weak Gift, the power of the Sanctuary and his will to protect Margaret sufficed to partly resurrect him at expense of his memories. Friday Monday has found his amnesiac persona, named him "Carrossea" and made his personal assistant, whereas his memories remained confined to the Sanctuary with the entity named "Poupee". Common past is probably the reason of the rapid mutual trust that appeared between Carrossea and Margaret upon their "first" meeting as personae.

Once he discovers the truth about his past, Carrossea vanishes.

- Voiced by: Toshiyuki Morikawa (Japanese); Vic Mignogna (English)

=== Limelda Jorg ===
Limelda Jorg (リメルダ・ユルグ, Rimeruda Yurugu) is a second lieutenant of the Gazth-Sonikan Royal Guard and the most prolific sniper in the country with the exception of Madlax. After the latter has assassinated the Commander-in-Chief of the Royalist Army, whom Limelda was assigned to protect, she has made it her duty to hunt down Madlax.

Despite multiple chances to kill Limelda, Madlax has always let her go and eventually shared with her the data she discovered on Enfant's involvement with Gazth-Sonikan war. This revelation shattered Limelda's world view and made her quit the Army and renew the attempts to kill Madlax in a crazy hope that once she is dead, everything will return to "normal". Limelda initially enlisted after her relatives were killed by Galza.

- Voiced by: Aya Hisakawa (Japanese); Christine Auten (English)

== Recurring characters ==
=== SSS ===
SSS (pronounced: Three-Speed (スリー・スピード, Surī Supīdo)) is Madlax's mysterious male contact, who acts as a liaison between her and the clients. Very little is known about him, except that he was the one who adopted and raised Madlax as an agent after 1999, and that he is likely not connected to Enfant and, in a way, opposes them. His face is never shown in the series, only its lower half, when he is talking via a mobile phone.

The DVD release of Madlax by ADV Films include multiple extras called "Conversations with SSS", which are a series of short clips following SSS's absurd dialogues with the rest of the cast.

- Voiced by: Jin Urayama (Japanese); Jay Hickman (English)

=== Quanzitta Marison ===
Quanzitta Marison (クアンジッタ・マリスン, Kuanjitta Marisun) is a mystic of a native village deep within the Gazth-Sonikan combat zone. Quanzitta is the owner of the third Holy Book, Thirstari, and one of the few who can read the Elies script and Saruon language that the Books are written in. She guards the Door of Truth and can communicate with the residents of the Sanctuary behind it. She sacrifices herself when Margaret ready to open the Door and is returned as a spirit.

- Voiced by: Mako Hyōdō (Japanese); Allison Sumrall (English)
- Mashimo Menu title: Deep-Sea Gatekeeper

=== Nakhl ===
Nakhl (ナハル, Naharu) is Lady Quanzitta's servant and agent. She is the most capable hand to hand and bladed weapons fighter in Gazth-Sonika and, effectively, the only one to ever defeat Madlax in combat. She follows Carrossea and tries to take Secondari from Margaret but fails. Eventually, she accompanies both Madlax and Elenore in addition to rescue Margaret. She is last seen praying next to her master's corpse.

- Voiced by: Chikayo Nakano (Japanese); Brittney Karbowski (English)

=== Laetitia ===
Laetitia (レティシア, Retishia) is the third persona of the former Margaret Burton and her memory keeper, who is unable to leave the Sanctuary behind the Door of Truth. The name "Laetitia" originally belonged to Margaret's favorite doll, and Madlax later used a forged Nafrecian passport with the name "Laetitia Luna" in it. Once everything is said and done, Margaret adopts Laetitia as her younger sister, finally allowing her to leave the place she's been stuck into.

According to Shigeru Kitayama, this character was named after the protagonist of the French film Les Aventuriers, which Kōichi Mashimo is particularly fond of, rather than after the Roman goddess of gaiety.

- Voiced by: Tomoko Kaneda (Japanese); Cynthia Martinez (English)

=== Poupée ===
Poupée (プーペ, Pūpe) is Carrossea Doon's memory keeper, just as Laetitia is Margaret's. He cannot leave the Sanctuary, either, nor even communicate with anyone except Laetitia. The name "Poupée" originally belonged to the boy who was killed by Colonel Burton, whereas "Carrossea Doon" was adopted by the persona who returned to the material world.

- Voiced by: N/A (Japanese); Ben Estus (English)

=== Richard Burton ===
Richard Burton (リチャード・バートン, Richādo Bāton) was Margaret's father and a colonel of the Nafrecian Army. During the ritual performed by Friday Monday in 1999, he was in Gazth-Sonika and attempted to stop it. Although Burton defeated Monday, the latter used the Words of Awakening from Firstari to force him to shoot his own daughter. Defending herself, Margaret shot her father instead. During their stand-off, Friday Monday addressed Colonel Burton only by his code name, which was "Madlax", and that was also the only word that two of Margaret's split personae later remembered.

Colonel Burton's face is partly shown very early in the series, but he is not addressed by name until much later on. Moreover, he is never addressed by his given name, but since the first letters on his damaged dog tag (now in Madlax's possession) are "Rich", it is safe to assume that he was named "Richard" because it is the only European given name that starts with them.

- Voiced by: Toru Ohkawa (Japanese); Ben Hamby (English)

== Minor characters ==
=== Pete Anyan ===
Pete Anyan (ピート, Pīto) is a young Galza freedom fighter whom Madlax rescues after his cell is wiped out by the Royalist forces. Pete was entrusted with some sensitive data by his superiors, which Madlax is assigned to retrieve from him. After going through several firefights together, Pete willingly hands the data over to Madlax and even invites her to a date, which, as she realizes, would be a blind one since they don't know each other's names. Pete tells his, however, Madlax only manages to tell a half of hers when Pete dies from a gunshot wound he suffered in the previous fight.

- Voiced by: Daisuke Namikawa (Japanese); Brandon Scott Peters (English)

=== Badgis ===
Badgis (バジス, Bajisu) is a friend of Vannessa Rene and an expert computer technician, in other words, a hacker. He has an unlimited access to a supercomputer he and his students built for scientific purposes and lends a hand in Vanessa search for evidence of Bookwald's involvement with the Gazth-Sonikan war. Using his machine, the two of them slice into the Bookwald mainframe and retrieve the necessary data, however, Friday Monday intercepts their attack and Badgis is forced to shut down his system. Later, in Episode 17, he meets with Margaret and Elenore to inform them about Enfant. What happens to him afterwards is unknown, but it is assumed that he survived. Apparently, Badgis has some romantic interest in Vanessa.

- Voiced by: Nozomu Sasaki (Japanese); Chris Patton (English)

=== Charlie Winston ===
Charlie (チャーリー, Chārī) is Vanessa Rene's colleague at Bookwald Industries. He seems to have personal feelings towards Vanessa, and even goes to look for her in Gazth-Sonika, when she is declared a fugitive. He is seen being shot by a policeman in the anarchy attending the series' climax, though he is shown have regained consciousness in the last episode. In the Series Bible, screenwriter Yōsuke Kuroda confirms that he survives. He has a rather small role in the series, but his character was much more important in the original draft of the series' screenplay.

- Voiced by: Tokuyoshi Kawashima (Japanese); John Gremillion (English)

=== Chris Krana ===
Chris Krana (クリス・クラナ, Kurisu Kurana) is an alleged teenage son of Galza's leader Min Durk and a Nafrecian woman, whose maiden name he adopted. After his mother's death, Chris tried to travel to Gazth-Sonika to meet with his father (whom he never knew personally), but Enfant prevented him from entering the country. In the end, a Nafrecian civil servant Piederico Moré secretly "smuggled" Chris into the country and hired Madlax as his bodyguard.

With Madlax's help, Chris reached Galza's headquarters, but hasn't found his father there. Instead, Friday Monday explained to him, that Min Durk was just a red herring created by Enfant, and that he, Chris Krana, thus, cannot exist. Krana's ultimate fate is unknown.

In episode 21, while Carrossea and Margaret perform the ritual, a young Chris Krana appeared with Margaret and Poupée during the plane crash in 1999, He most likely died with the other victims of the crash.

- Voiced by: Miyu Irino (Japanese); Braden Hunt (English)

=== Min Durk ===
Min Durk (ミュン・デルク, Myun Deruku) is the alleged leader of Galza religious group. In fact, he never existed, and all his appearances were orchestrated by Enfant in order to continue the Gazth-Sonikan civil war.

=== Eric Gillian ===
Eric Gillian (エリック・ジラン, Erikku Jiran) is a Nafrecian "bibliodetective", whose job is to locate rare books for his customers. Margaret hires him to find the second copy of her Secondari, and he soon travels to Gazth-Sonika, where he believes that he can find some clues. Madlax is assigned to protect Gillian and eventually brings him to Quanzitta Marison, who tells him about a cave where the walls are covered by Elies letters similar to those found in the book he looks for. In the cave, Gillian is subjected to the effects of the Words of Awakening and remembers an episode of his past that he has forgotten: in his youth, he has shot three men who had raped and murdered his sister. Unable to live with this guilt, Gillian throws himself off a cliff.

- Voiced by: Hiroaki Hirata (Japanese); Andy McAvin (English)

=== Luciano ===
Luciano (ルチアーノ, Ruchiāno) is Madlax's colleague and friend in Gazth-Sonika. The first time we see him, he decides to leave Gazth-Sonika for good, but must first finish the last mission in Nafrece. On the way there, he meets Margaret, Vanessa, and Elenore and is immediately attracted to the former, however, she becomes an unfortunate distraction for him and he fails to assassinate his target, Carrossea Doon, and is taken down by Limelda Jorg.

- Voiced by: Yū Mizushima (Japanese); Illich Guardiola (English)

=== Guen McNichol ===
Guen McNichol (グエン・マクニコル, Guen Makunikoru) is the Commander-in-Chief of the Gazth-Sonikan Royal Army, whose family was killed by Galza shortly after the war started. He has been fighting Galza ever since, and being a distant relative of the King, raised through the ranks quickly. Lately, however, he has become aware that despite his efforts, nothing changes in the country and concluded that someone (Enfant) manipulates the entire war. To express his protest, he hires Madlax to assassinate him right in the middle of the demilitarized zone, which she carries out precisely.

Guen McNichol's assassination makes Limelda Jorg, who was in charge of his safety, start hunting down Madlax, which eventually leads to Vanessa Rene's death.

- Voiced by: Kinryu Arimoto (Japanese); Rick Piersall (English)

=== Maclay Marini ===
Maclay Marini (マクレイ・マリニ, Makurei Marini) is a Nafrecian detective who investigates the Moré case. He soon realizes that Enfant must be behind it, but gets assigned to another case by his superiors. After he refuses to stop his investigation, Enfant systematically destroys every evidence that he has ever existed and, eventually, his very identity. The last time we see him, he doesn't recognize his former name.

- Voiced by: Masaki Terasoma (Japanese); Jason Douglas (English)

=== Anne Moré ===
Anne Moré (アンヌ・モレイ, Annu Morei) is Margaret Burton's classmate and Piederico Moré's daughter. According to Margaret, Anne was very kind, however, after Enfant subjected her to the Words of Awakening, she killed her own father and then threw herself out of the window.

- Voiced by: Kaori Nazuka (Japanese); Mariela Ortiz (English)

=== Piederico Moré ===
Piederico Moré (ピエデリカ・モレイ, Piederika Morei) is a Nafrecian civil servant who smuggles Chris Krana to Gazth-Sonika and hires Madlax as his bodyguard. In return, Moré asks him to convince his father, Min Durk, to cease hostilities with the Royal Army. However, by helping Krana, Moré displeases Enfant and Friday Monday personally sends the Words of Awakening to his daughter Anne with an e-mail. Affected by the Words of Saruon, Anne first strangles Piederico, then commits suicide herself.

- Voiced by: N/A (Japanese); Ty Mahany (English)
