= Keiichi Nozaki =

Japanese anime music producer (born 1961)

Keiichi Nozaki (野崎 圭一, Nozaki Keiichi, born 11 June 1961) is a Japanese anime music producer currently affiliated with Victor Entertainment. His hired works include Savage Genius and Yuki Kajiura.

== Staff in ==
- .hack//Liminality (music producer)
- .hack//SIGN (music producer)
- Aquarian Age: Sign for Evolution (music producer, ending theme arrangement)
- The Big O (music producer)
- Bakumatsu Kikansetsu Irohanihoheto (music producer)
- Bubblegum Crisis Tokyo 2040 (music producer)
- Burst Angel (music producer)
- Chocotto Sister (music producer)
- Excel Saga (music producer)
- Gear Fighter Dendoh (music producer)
- Hand Maid May (music producer)
- Jubei-chan (music producer)
- L/R: Licensed by Royalty (music producer, opening theme arrangement)
- Madlax (music producer)
- Mobile Suit Gundam MS IGLOO (music producer)
- Mobile Suit Gundam SEED (music producer)
- Mobile Suit Gundam SEED C.E. 73: Stargazer (music producer)
- Mobile Suit Gundam SEED Destiny (music producer)
- Pandora Hearts (music producer)
- Simoun (music producer)
- The SoulTaker (music producer)
- Uta Kata (music producer, opening and ending theme arrangement)
- Witch Hunter Robin (music producer)
- You're Under Arrest (music producer)
