= Synchronicity (Yui Makino song) =

2007 song by Yui Makino

- Cover art for the regular version

Single by Yui Makino
- B-side: "Amrita: Hikigatari"
- Released: November 21, 2007
- Genre: J-pop
- Composer: Yuki Kajiura
- Lyricist: Yui Makino

Music video

"Synchronicity" is a maxi single performed by Yui Makino first released on November 21, 2007, by Victor Entertainment under the catalog number VTCL-35007.

== Production ==
The lyrics, composition, and arrangement for the single are provided by Yuki Kajiura, Makino Yui, Caoli Cano and Shunsuke Takizawa. It contains 3 tracks in both regular and instrumental versions.

== Use in media ==
The track "Synchronicity" was featured as the opening theme to the OVA adaptation Tsubasa Tokyo Revelations.

== B-sides ==
Its B-side is titled "Amrita: Hikigatari" (アムリタ -弾き語り-; lit. Amurita: Self-Accompaniment).

== Reception ==
It peaked at number 49 on the Oricon singles chart and remained on the chart for three weeks. Makino was the voice actress for Sakura in the anime TV series and films.

== Sales ==
- Oricon peak position: No. 49
- Weeks on chart: 3
- 4,158 copies sold

== Track listing ==
1. Synchronicity
2. アムリタ -弾き語り-
3. Synchronicity (Instrumental)

== Covers and renditions ==
For Kajiura's FictionJunction album Everlasting Songs, the song was performed by Keiko and arranged by Koichi Korenaga.
