= Romanesque (song) =

Single by FictionJunction Yuuka
- Released: April 18, 2007 (JP)
- Recorded: 2007
- Genre: J-pop
- Label: Victor Entertainment
- Producer: Victor Entertainment

FictionJunction Yuuka singles chronology
"Kōya Ruten" (2006)	"Romanesque" (2007)

"Romanesque" is a maxi single composed and performed by J-pop duo FictionJunction Yuuka. It was released on April 18, 2007, and manufactured and distributed by Victor Entertainment

The lead single, Romanesque, was the ending song of the anime El Cazador de la Bruja and was composed by Yuki Kajiura.

The maxi-single peaked at #23 on the Oricon weekly charts.

== Track listing ==
All tracks are written by Yuki Kajiura.

No.	Title	Length
1.	"Romanesque"	4:25
2.	"Yakusoku" (約束 / promise)	5:39
3.	"Romanesque (instrumental)"	4:25
4.	"Yakusoku (instrumental)" (約束 (オリジナル・カラオケ))	5:35
Total length:		20:04

== Charts ==
Oricon Sales Chart (Japan)

Release	Chart	Peak position	First week sales	Sales total	Chart run
April 18, 2007	Oricon Weekly Singles Chart	24	6,028	6,028*	5 weeks

(*): Sales after 2 weeks

== Personnel ==
Credits are adapted from Discogs

- Vocals – FictionJunction Yuuka
- Art Direction, Design – Riichiro Yoshida
- Coordinator – Fumio Takano
- Engineer [Assistant] – Sayuri Taguchi, Yoshio Ohira
- Executive-Producer – Ikko Onishi, Shiro Sasaki
- Keyboards, Programmed By – Yuki Kajiura
- Management – Maki Fukuda
- Mastered By – Kazushige Yamazaki
- Photography By – Hideo Kanno
- Producer – Keiichi Nozaki, Yasutsu Mori
- Recorded By, Mixed By – Takashi Koiwa
- Supervised By – Koichi Mashimo, Shigeru Kitayama
