= Hitomi no Kakera =

Single by FictionJunction Yuuka

from the album Destination
- B-side: "nowhere"
- Released: May 8, 2004 (JP)
- Recorded: 2004
- Genre: Japanese Pop
- Length: 15:37
- Label: Victor Entertainment; VICL-35627 (Japan, CD)
- Songwriter(s): Yuki Kajiura
- Producer(s): Victor Entertainment

FictionJunction Yuuka singles chronology
"Hitomi no Kakera" (2004)	"Inside Your Heart" (2004)

"Hitomi no Kakera" (瞳の欠片, Fragments of a Gaze) is the debut single of J-pop duo FictionJunction Yuuka, from their debut album Destination. It was composed by Yuki Kajiura and released on May 8, 2004. The single debuted at #22 on the Oricon Weekly Charts and had 20 weeks on chart. Both Hitomi no Kakera and its B-side, nowhere, featured in the Bee Train anime series Madlax.

== Track listing ==
1. Hitomi no Kakera (瞳の欠片, Fragments of a Gaze)
2. nowhere
3. Hitomi no Kakera (original karaoke) (瞳の欠片（オリジナル・カラオケ)
4. nowhere (original karaoke) (nowhere（オリジナル・カラオケ)

== Madlax Soundtrack ==
Hitomi no Kakera was originally composed by FictionJunction Yuuka as a theme song for the anime Madlax. The song originally featured on the OST for the series before it was released as a single, which gained the band significant fame on the J-pop scene. Both Hitomi no Kakera and its B-side track nowhere were used throughout the anime, Hitomi no Kakera being opening theme for the series, and nowhere being used mainly during the fights and action scenes. Both songs feature on the series' OST as well as on FictionJunction Yuuka's album.
