= Silly-Go-Round =

Single by FictionJunction Yuuka
- B-side: "Angel Gate"
- Released: May 10, 2006 (JP)
- Recorded: 2006
- Genre: J-pop
- Label: Victor Entertainment; VICL-35889 (Japan, CD)
- Producer: Victor Entertainment

FictionJunction Yuuka singles chronology
"Honoh no Tobira" (2005)	"Silly-Go-Round" (2006)	"Kōya Ruten" (2006)

"Silly-Go-Round" is the fifth single of J-pop duo FictionJunction Yuuka. It was released on May 10, 2006.

This single includes the opening theme song for the anime series .hack//Roots, as well as "angel gate", a song from the musical Angel Gate: Haru no Yokan (Angel Gate: 春の予感) in which Yuuka Nanri, the vocalist of FictionJunction Yuuka, stars. Both songs were composed by Yuki Kajiura. Its catalog number is VICL-35889.

== Track listing ==
From FlyingDog.

Silly-Go-Round track list
No.	Title	Lyrics	Music	Length
1.	"Silly-Go-Round" (Opening theme)	Yuki Kajiura	Yuki Kajiura
2.	"Angel Gate"
3.	"Silly-Go-Round (instrumental)"
4.	"Angel Gate (instrumental)"
Total length:				20:50

== Charts ==
Oricon Sales Chart (Japan)

Release	Chart	Peak position	First week sales	Sales total	Chart run
May 10, 2006	Oricon Weekly Singles Chart	12	16,125	25,932*	10 weeks

* Sales after 3 weeks
