= Inside Your Heart =

Single by FictionJunction Yuuka

from the album Destination
- B-side: "I'm Here"
- Released: July 7, 2004 (JP)
- Recorded: 2004
- Genre: Japanese Pop
- Label: Victor Entertainment; VICL-35646 (Japan, CD)
- Songwriter(s): Yuki Kajiura
- Producer(s): Victor Entertainment

FictionJunction Yuuka singles chronology
"Hitomi no Kakera" (2004)	"Inside Your Heart" (2004)	"Akatsuki no Kuruma" (2004)

"Inside Your Heart" is the second single of J-pop duo FictionJunction Yuuka. It was released on July 27, 2004.

This single included the ending and one of the two insert songs for the anime Madlax, both composed by Yuki Kajiura. Its catalog number is VICL-35646.

This single debuted at #22 on the Oricon Weekly Charts and had 6 weeks on charts.

== Track listing ==
1. Inside Your Heart
2. I'm Here
3. Inside Your Heart (original karaoke) (Inside Your Heart（オリジナル・カラオケ)
4. I'm Here (original karaoke) (I'm here（オリジナル・カラオケ)
