= Kōya Ruten =

Single by FictionJunction Yuuka
- B-side: "Blessing"
- Released: November 22, 2006 (JP)
- Recorded: 2006
- Genre: J-pop
- Label: Victor Entertainment; VICL-36177 (Japan, CD)
- Songwriter(s): Yuki Kajiura
- Producer(s): Victor Entertainment

FictionJunction Yuuka singles chronology
"Silly-Go-Round" (2005)	"Kōya Ruten" (2006)	"Romanesque" (2007)

"Kōya Ruten" (荒野流転, Wilderness Vicissitudes) is the sixth single of J-pop duo FictionJunction Yuuka. It was released on November 22, 2006.

This single included opening song of the anime Bakumatsu Kikansetsu Irohanihoheto, as well a song from the musical Angel Gate: Haru no Yokan (Angel Gate: 春の予感～) in which Yuuka Nanri, the vocalist of FictionJunction Yuuka, stars in. Both songs were composed by Yuki Kajiura. Its catalog number is VICL-36177.

This single peaked at #13 on the Oricon weekly charts.

== Track listing ==
From Flying Dog.

1. Kōya Ruten (荒野流転, Wilderness Vicissitudes)
2. Blessing
3. Kōya Ruten (without vocal) (荒野流転 (without vocal))
4. Blessing (without vocal)

== Charts ==
Oricon Sales Chart (Japan)

Release	Chart	Peak position	First week sales	Sales total
November 22, 2006	Oricon Weekly Singles Chart	13	9,396	11,800*

(*): Sales after 2 weeks
