= FictionJunction Yuuka =

Japanese pop duo

- Origin: Japan
- Genre: Pop
- Years active: 2003–2014, 2019
- Label: FlyingDog
- Spinoff of: FictionJunction
- Past members: Yuki Kajiura; Yuuka Nanri
- Website: www.jvcmusic.co.jp/fj_yuuka/

FictionJunction Yuuka (フィクションジャンクション・ユウカ, Fikushon Jankushon Yūka; stylized as FictionJunction YUUKA) is a pop duo from Japan consisting of Yuuka Nanri (vocals) and composer Yuki Kajiura (composition, lyrics and keyboards). It is part of Kajiura's solo project FictionJunction.

== Biography ==
The pair first met at Minami Aoyama Shōjo Kagekidan (南青山少女歌劇団, South Aoyama Female Opera Group; also called Nanshō), a stage group for teenage girls where Kajiura wrote music for some of the plays and Nanri was a performer.

Their first recording was "Akatsuki no Kuruma" (暁の車; "Wheel of Dawn"), an insert song in the popular mecha anime Mobile Suit Gundam SEED, though their debut single was the opening of Madlax, "Hitomi no Kakera" (瞳の欠片; "Fragments of the Eyes"), released on May 8, 2004. On July 27, 2004, the ending theme to Madlax, "Inside Your Heart", was released. In the same year, because of its popularity and the fact that it was Gundam SEED's one-year anniversary, "Akatsuki no Kuruma" was released as a single, which at its peak placed at #10 on the Oricon weekly rankings and sold over 19,481 copies in the first week.

After a hiatus of exactly a year, "Honoh no Tobira" (焔の扉, Honō no Tobira; "Door of Flames") an insert song for Mobile Suit Gundam SEED Destiny, was released, becoming the first voice actor single to hit #1 on Oricon daily rankings.

On November 23, 2005, the duo released their debut album, Destination, which placed on the Oricon weekly rankings at #9.

On May 10, 2006, FictionJunction Yuuka released their fifth single after approximately eight months. That year, they also recorded a song, "Aikoi", for the Tsubasa Chronicle anime series, which was not released as a single but instead included in the anime's fourth original soundtrack. In November of that same year, they released the opening theme for Sunrise's Bakumatsu Kikansetsu Irohanihoheto, "Kōya Ruten" (荒野流転; "Wilderness Vicissitudes").

FictionJunction Yuuka held their first live concert entitled Premium Live 2007 on February 8 and February 15 of 2007. A new album, Circus was announced and it was released on July 4 of the same year.. As Kajiura is handling the music for upcoming anime El Cazador de la Bruja, their seventh single, "Romanesque", became the ending theme of the anime above. El Cazador de la Bruja was produced by Bee Train, whose anime productions FictionJunction Yuuka has also done songs for previously.

== Discography ==
=== Singles ===
#	Information
1	Hitomi no Kakera (瞳の欠片; "The Fragments of the Eyes"): Released: May 8, 2004; Opening song and insert song for the anime Madlax.
2	Inside Your Heart: Released: July 27, 2004; Ending song and insert song for the anime Madlax.
3	Akatsuki no Kuruma (暁の車; "The Wheels of Dawn"): Released: September 22, 2004 (May 8 2013 re-released); Insert song for the anime Gundam SEED, which was at first released in SUIT CD vol. 4 Miguel Ayman × Nicol Amarfi, but because of the song's popularity and the fact that it September 2004 was Gundam SEED's one-year anniversary, it was later released as a single.
4	Honoh no Tobira (焔の扉, The Door of Flames): Released: September 22, 2005 (May 8 2013 re-released); Insert song for the anime Mobile Suit Gundam SEED Destiny.; First voice actor single in Oricon history to become #1 on the daily rankings.
5	Silly-Go-Round: Released: May 10, 2006; Opening song for the anime .hack//Roots.
6	Kōya Ruten (荒野流転; "Wilderness Vicissitudes"): Released: November 22, 2006; Opening song for the anime Bakumatsu Kikansetsu Irohanihoheto.
7	Romanesque: Released: April 18, 2007; Ending song for the anime El Cazador de la Bruja.

=== Albums ===
#	Information
1	Destination: Released: November 23, 2005 (re-released May 8, 2013)
2	Circus: Released: July 4, 2007 (re-released May 8, 2013)

=== DVD & Blu-ray Releases ===
Year	Title	Information
2009	FictionJunction YUUKA ~Yuki Kajiura Live Vol. 4 Part I~ Everlasting Songs Tour 2009	The limited edition came with a photo booklet, the PV for "Nostalgia", and an exclusive case.
2014	Yuki Kajiura LIVE vol.#11 FictionJunction YUUKA 2days Special 2014.02.08~09 Nakano Sunplaza	

== FictionJunction ==
FictionJunction Yuuka performed alongside her fellow FJ peers in Yuki Kajiura LIVE Vol. #4 Everlasting Songs Tour 2009. She is credited as a vocalist for the FictionJunction Club single "sing a song" which was released on March 16, 2012.

=== Singles/Albums ===
#	Information
1	Everlasting Songs (FictionJunction Album): Released: February 25, 2009; Yuuka Nanri performed the Ending Song of Tsubasa Shunraiki "Kioku no Mori" (Forest Of Memories) in this album as FictionJunction (YUUKA, WAKANA, KEIKO, KAORI, YURIKO KAIDA, and ASUKA), And Cazador del amor from El Cazador de la Bruja.
2	Parallel Hearts (FictionJunction Single): Release: April 29, 2009; FictionJunction YUUKA performed the second track in the album titled "Hitomi no Chikara"
3	Sing A Song / Silent Moon (FictionJunction Club Limited Single): Release: June 16, 2012; FictionJunction YUUKA performed the second track in the album titled "Silent Moon"

== Appearances ==
=== TV ===
- NHK – Pop Joins the World
- NHK – PopJam

=== Concerts ===
- Victor Dreamin' Xmas ☆ 2006 in Omotesandō (Victor Dreamin' Xmas ☆ 2006 in 表参道) – (December 23, 24, and 25, 2006 – Year-end concert for Victor Entertainment artists.
- Premium Live 2007 (February 8 and 15, 2007) – First solo concert.
- Yuki Kajiura Live Vol. #4 Everlasting Songs Tour 2009 – Part 1 of 2 part performance (July 7–12, 2009)
- Yuki Kajiura Live Vol.#10 "Kaji Fes.2013″ (May 13, 2013)
- Yuki Kajiura Live Vol.#11 "elemental" FictionJunction Yuuka 2Days Special (February 8–9, 2014)
- FlyingDog 10th Anniversary Live "Inu Fes." (February 2, 2019)
