= Honō no Tobira =

Single by FictionJunction Yuuka
- Released: September 22, 2005
- Recorded: 2005
- Genre: J-pop
- Label: Victor Entertainment

FictionJunction Yuuka singles chronology
"Akatsuki no Kuruma" (2004)	"Honō no Tobira" (2005)	"Silly-Go-Round" (2006)

"Honō no Tobira" (焔の扉, Honō no Tobira), translated as "Door of Flames", is the fourth single of J-pop duo FictionJunction Yuuka. It was released on September 22, 2005.

This single includes an insert song of the anime Mobile Suit Gundam SEED Destiny, composed by Yuki Kajiura. There are two other versions of the song on the single (hearty and instrumental), along with its karaoke version. Its catalog number is VICL-35883. Coincidentally, the insert song of Gundam SEED (Gundam SEED Destiny's prequel), "Akatsuki no Kuruma", was released exactly one year before this single.

This single peaked at number 5 on the Oricon weekly chart, but is the first single in voice acting history to reach number 1 on the Oricon daily ranking.

== Track listing ==
1. Honō no Tobira (焔の扉, Door of Flames)
2. Honō no Tobira: hearty edition (焔の扉: hearty edition)
3. Honō no Tobira: instrumental edition (焔の扉: instrumental edition)
4. Honō no Tobira (original karaoke) (焔の扉（オリジナル・カラオケ）)

== Charts ==
Oricon Sales Chart (Japan)

Release	Chart	Peak position	First week sales	Sales total
September 22, 2005	Oricon Weekly Singles Chart	5	45,064	97,179 copies
