= Akatsuki no Kuruma =

Single by FictionJunction Yuuka
- Released: September 22, 2004
- Recorded: 2003
- Genre: J-pop
- Label: Victor Entertainment

FictionJunction Yuuka singles chronology
"Inside Your Heart" (2004)	"Akatsuki no Kuruma" (2004)	"Honoh no Tobira" (2005)

"Akatsuki no Kuruma" (暁の車, /Chariots of Dawn) is the third single of J-pop duo FictionJunction Yuuka. It was released on September 22, 2004.

This single includes an insert song of the anime Gundam SEED, composed by Yuki Kajiura. There are two other versions of the song on the single (piano and acoustic), along with its karaoke version. Its catalog number is VICL-35646. Coincidentally, the insert song of Mobile Suit Gundam SEED Destiny (Gundam SEED's sequel), "Honoh no Tobira", was released exactly one year after this single.

Originally, this song was released on "Suit CD vol.4 Miguel Ayman x Nicol Amarfi", an EP from Gundam SEED, under the name "FictionJunction featuring Yuuka". Due to the song's popularity and the fact that September 2004 was Gundam SEED's one-year anniversary, it was later released as a single obtaining the twelfth place on the Oricon charts, which later rose to the tenth. The song has been FictionJunction YUUKA's best-selling single.

== Track listing ==
From Flying Dog.

1. Akatsuki no Kuruma (暁の車, Wheels of Dawn / Trains of Dawn)
2. Akatsuki no Kuruma: piano version / Yuki Kajiura (暁の車: piano version / 梶浦 由記)
3. Akatsuki no Kuruma: acoustic version (暁の車: acoustic version)
4. Akatsuki no Kuruma: without vocal (暁の車: without vocal)

== Charts ==
Oricon Sales Chart (Japan)

Release	Chart	Peak position	First week sales	Sales total
September 22, 2004	Oricon Weekly Singles Chart	10	19,481	109,777

== Cover versions ==
The song was covered by Hiroko Moriguchi in 2019 as an Amazon Music exclusive single. It was added as a bonus track in Moriguchi's 2020 album Gundam Song Covers 2.
