= Madlax =

2004 Japanese anime television series

- The central characters of the series

マドラックス (Madorakkusu)
- Genre: Girls with guns, mystery, supernatural
- Anime television series
- Directed by: Kōichi Mashimo
- Produced by: Shigeru Kitayama; Tatsuya Hamamoto
- Written by: Yōsuke Kuroda
- Music by: Yuki Kajiura
- Studio: Bee Train
- Licensed by: AUS: Madman Entertainment; NA: AEsir Holdings
- Original network: TV Tokyo
- English network: US: Anime Network
- Original run: 5 April 2004 – 27 September 2004
- Episodes: 26
- Light novel

Tabi Suru Shoujo to Shakunetsu no Kuni
- Written by: Seiya Fujiwara
- Illustrated by: Shunsuke Tagami
- Published by: Hobby Japan
- Imprint: HJ Bunko
- Published: 1 June 2011

Madlax (マドラックス, Madorakkusu) is a 26-episode Japanese anime television series produced in 2004 by the Bee Train animation studio. Kōichi Mashimo directed Madlax and the soundtrack was composed by Yuki Kajiura. The DVD version was released by ADV Films in North America and the United Kingdom and by Madman Entertainment in Australia and New Zealand.

The story revolves around the two young women Margaret and Madlax, who seemingly have little in common and do not know of the other's existence at the beginning. Madlax is a legendary mercenary and assassin in the fictional civil war-torn country of Gazth-Sonika, who cannot remember her past or indeed her real name before twelve years ago, when the war started. The other main character is Margaret Burton, the sole heir of a wealthy aristocratic family in the peaceful European country Nafrece. Twelve years before the story begins, an airliner Margaret and her mother were on crashed over Gazth-Sonika, and its passengers, as well as Margaret's father who led the rescuers, have been missing ever since. Margaret, however, mysteriously traveled back to Nafrece on her own, losing her memories prior to her return; the only thing she recalls is a single word, "Madlax". With this thread linking the two girls, they both independently start investigating the powerful crime syndicate Enfant after its enigmatic mastermind shows interest in both of them.

Madlax was produced as a spiritual successor to the studio's earlier project, Noir, and together with El Cazador de la Bruja, these series constitute a trilogy exploring the "girls-with-guns" genre. The production of Madlax began in 2002 but it was not until Yōsuke Kuroda joined the project that the series took its final form. While the critics noted the resulting similarities between Noir and Madlax, they also acknowledged the differences, such as the latter's less episodic and more plot-driven style and, in particular contrast to the predominantly realistic Noir, incorporation of many supernatural elements, which the audience must often interpret without further explanation.

== Plot ==
The first half of the series alternates between the two leads. Madlax is one of the most efficient special ops agents for hire in the war-torn Gazth-Sonika, while Margaret Burton is a sleepy, clumsy amnesiac living in Nafrece, a country styled after France. When a "picture book", presumably given to Margaret by her late father, attracts the attention of international criminal network Enfant, she discovers that the origins of the book lie in Gazth-Sonika. Enfant's top operative, Carrossea Doon, tracks Margaret down but tips off his superiors in the wrong direction, towards Madlax, who has been causing Enfant trouble for some time. Meanwhile, Vanessa Rene, Margaret's former tutor whose parents died because of Gazth-Sonikan war, discovers that her current employer, Bookwald Industries, covertly supports the war by supplying both sides with firearms and starts investigating its true cause. Her investigation brings her to Gazth-Sonika, where Madlax is hired as her bodyguard, and together, they uncover data that proves Enfant orchestrated the entire conflict. Enfant eventually intercepts them and they are forced into hiding. Back in Nafrece, Margaret decides to help Vanessa and travels to Gazth-Sonika, accompanied by her devoted and sometimes overprotective maid Elenore Baker and Carrossea Doon.

Eventually, Madlax and Margaret meet and embark on a search for Quanzitta Marison, a Gazth-Sonikan mystic who supposedly knows about Margaret's book, Enfant's involvement with it, and Enfant itself. Lady Quanzitta does indeed tell them about Enfant and its plans to plunge the entire world into a total war, starting with Gazth-Sonika. She reveals that Enfant's leader Friday Monday possesses supernatural powers connected to the three ancient books, one of which belongs to Margaret. Margaret uses her own supernatural abilities and that of her book to return her lost memories. Carrossea, who has been aiding Margaret, requests that his memories be restored as well despite warnings not to do so; he discovers that he, in fact, died 12 years ago and held on to life only by sheer force of will to protect Margaret. Carrossea disappears, and Margaret is captured by Monday who intends to use her abilities to advance his own plans.

Unable to shoot her father in self-defence, Margaret expelled her wish to survive from herself, creating Madlax, who pulled the trigger for her. Laetitia (originally her doll) was created to seal off the memory of this event, preventing the two from merging.

While Margaret and Carrossea perform the ritual, Madlax is attacked by Limelda Jorg, a Gazth-Sonikan sniper who holds a grudge against Madlax ever since she failed to stop an assassination by Madlax earlier in the show. Limelda kills Vanessa while targeting Madlax, sending the latter into clinical depression. Elenore and Lady Quanzitta's servant Nakhl manage to restore Madlax's will to live and persuade her to save Margaret, and the three storm Enfant's headquarters together. During the assault, Elenore is killed and Margaret, now under Monday's control, shoots Madlax.

Believing Madlax to be dead, Monday commences a ritual to unleash people's inhibitions and trigger worldwide anarchy; but Margaret's memories return and she snaps out of his mind control. Only now does the audience learn the back-story: back in 1999, Monday drove Margaret's father insane with his powers and she was forced to kill her own father. To escape the horrible truth of her patricide, Margaret split herself into three personae: the "memory keeper" Laetitia, the sinful Madlax, and the innocent Margaret herself. Margaret then fuses her three personae back together to undo the ritual she previously performed with Monday, saving the world from insanity. Madlax, who should no longer exist after the fusion, appears and guns down Monday. It becomes apparent that Margaret has once again split herself into three, judging that after twelve years, she no longer has the right to make decisions for her other personae.

When everything is said and done, Margaret fully releases Madlax so she can live her life freely and also adopts Laetitia as her younger sister so she will not be alone. Madlax ultimately makes peace with Limelda and they travel together.

== Themes ==
Madlax is set against the backdrop of Gazth-Sonikan war and the first episodes contrast the tranquil Nafrece with the war-torn Gazth-Sonika; later, the story moves completely to the combat zone, focusing on the central characters, such as Limelda Jorg, and their suffering. In an interview, the director Mashimo stated that "[t]he story is about portraying inner struggles of people, while showing what life is like in this place of madness and this other place of peace". Accordingly, the series' title is a portmanteau of two English words, "mad" and "relaxed", mirroring the authors' intention to portray the two extremes of human being.

Madlax also plays as the story of Margaret Burton's search for her psychological identity. Based on the Mashimo Menu theme titles available to her, Yuki Kajiura has suggested an interpretation that while searching for her memories, Margaret meets the other characters ("Gatekeepers") one after another and learns about the lifestyles ("Gates") they represent. In the end, she finds her own "Gate", which is the new identity that finally replaces the one she lost twelve years ago.

== Production ==
=== Writing ===
According to the director Kōichi Mashimo, he envisioned Noir and Madlax as part of a trilogy exploring the girls-with-guns genre, and soon after the release of the latter, he confirmed having plans to produce the third installment, which would later become El Cazador de la Bruja. In late 2002, Mashimo invited Shigeru Kitayama, the producer of Noir who once came up with its original idea, to discuss a new series entitled Madlax. Kitayama greatly expanded Mashimo's original screenplay plan, but it was not until Yōsuke Kuroda was put in charge of the script that the series took its final appearance. It took Kuroda around one year to finish the screenplays for all 26 episodes, during which he was constantly encouraged by Mashimo to add his own original ideas to their initial plan. Kuroda has admitted that at the time he received Mashimo's invitation, he felt frustrated after his first project has been canceled by the publisher, so he decided to make Madlax "really extravagant", blending as many genres at once as he could. Kōichi Mashimo, furthermore, admitted that the most unusual plot twists, like Margaret and Madlax's connection to each other, were invented by Kuroda and him while drunk.

=== Character design ===
By comparison with Noir, Madlax features a much larger primary cast, including multiple recurring male characters, an element nearly absent in the former. It was not so in the original screenplay draft written by Mashimo and Kitayama: for example, "Madlax" was Margaret's own nickname and Charlie (Vanessa's colleague at Bookwald Industries) had one of the central roles similar to Speedy's in Avenger. Only the "draft" characters' names remained of them when Kuroda has rewritten the script. A total of three character designers collaborated on Madlax cast: Satoshi Ohsawa (who also worked on Noir cast) created the central heroines Margaret and Madlax; Minako Shiba drew Friday Monday and Carrossea Doon; and Satoko Miyachi was entrusted with the "mysterious" characters, Laetitia and Poupee.

=== Music ===
As with many of studio Bee Train's other works, the entire Madlax soundtrack was composed by the acclaimed Yuki Kajiura, making it her and Kōichi Mashimo's fifth project together. In an interview Kajiura recalls having written the score in a hotel high-rise to save studio costs, and that this change in location helped her to explore different styles of music.

Kajiura and Yuuka Nanri's duo FictionJunction Yuuka recorded the series' opening and ending themes, "Fragments of an Eye" (瞳の欠片, Hitomi no Kakera) and "Inside Your Heart", respectively, as well as two insert songs: "nowhere" and "I'm here". Aside from the opening sequence, "Fragments of an Eye" is featured in the series itself: at the end of episode 18 and in the episode 24, when Margaret is humming its tune to herself in the flower field.

In the insert song "nowhere", there is a frequently repeated background refrain "Yanmaani" (ヤンマーニ, Yanmāni). It does not have any particular meaning but since the song usually plays when Madlax is fighting, "Yanmaani" has become something of a joke to Japanese fans, claiming that it apparently gives her superpowers.

== Media ==
=== Television series ===
Originally, Madlax was broadcast in Japan by TV Tokyo from 5 April to 27 September 2004, from 1:30 to 2:00 a.m. every Tuesday (formally, Monday night). Shortly before the series finished airing, it has been licensed in North America and Europe by ADV Films, which has previously acquired distribution rights for Noir and has long had plans to license its successor, as well. The official English dub has been released in the United States under the trademark MADLAX on a total of seven DVDs from 12 April 2005 to 28 March 2006. A complete collection was released by ADV on 17 July 2007. Madlax has become the first series on which ADV Films' director and producer David Williams tested the technology of distributing promotional materials via P2P network BitTorrent. As of September 1, 2009, all the titles from ADV's catalog, including Madlax, were transferred to AEsir Holdings, with distribution from Section23 Films.

The North-American DVD release contains extras available in English only, such the controversial self-parody Conversations with SSS and Sock Puppet Theater, an Easter egg live action about Madlax going after Chris Patton, Badgis' voice actor and an annoying womanizer.

On 7 February 2006, the first episode of Madlax aired on Anime Network (which was, like ADV Films, a subsidiary of A.D. Vision at the time). On 4 April, shortly after the last DVD volume has been released, the consequent broadcast was put on halt and until 27 June, only the first 8 episodes were repeated. Since then, the series has been relaunched multiple times. Madman Entertainment, who previously licensed Noir in its region, has acquired rights for distribution of Madlax in Australia and New Zealand and released it on seven DVD volumes between 20 July 2005 and 26 July 2006. A complete collection was released on 4 April 2007.

=== Soundtrack ===
The series' original soundtrack was released on two albums on 21 July and 22 September 2004 by Victor Entertainment. Two singles, Hitomi no Kakera and Inside Your Heart, were published in the same year by FictionJunction Yuuka, each containing an opening/ending theme and one insert song, as well as their respective karaoke versions.

=== Artbook ===
MADLAX the Bible is a 95-page artbook that was published in Japan on 21 May 2005 by Hobby Japan. Aside from illustrations and artworks for the series, it contains interviews with its authors and voice actors, as well as diverse additional information about the show in Japanese. The artbook has never been published outside Japan. Since the word "Bible" is derived from Ancient Greek: τὰ βιβλία τὰ ἅγια, meaning "holy books", it is likely that the artbook's title is a reference to the Holy Books that play an important role in the series' plot.

=== Merchandise ===
A resin model kit known as "Madlax with Guns" has been produced, featuring a figurine of Madlax dual wielding her signature SIG P210s. A polystone figurine entitled simply "Madlax", was launched in August 2007. In Japan, a T-shirt with Madlax logo has been added to the limited edition of the first DVD volume, and the "first press" of the OST albums came with logotype mousepads.

=== Light novel ===
A light novel spin-off of the series, titled A Traveling Girl and the Land of Ignorance (旅する少女と灼熱の国, Tabi Suru Shoujo to Shakunetsu no Kuni), has been published on 1 June 2011 by Hobby Japan. Written by Seiya Fujiwara and illustrated by Shunsuke Tagami (neither of whom had been involved in the production of the original TV series), the book focuses on Elenore Baker as the main character in a setting somewhat different from that of the anime. In this continuity, Elenore is a combat-trained maid traveling across the war-torn Gazth-Sonika, looking for the lost Margaret and, along the way, helping the weary locals with their struggles.

== Reception ==
Madlax was often accused of being secondary and reusing Noir's stylistic solutions, such as the story premise, the two heroines' appearance, and the musical style. Nevertheless, some sources praised the story for being more monolithic and consequent than its predecessor's, owing to all its episodes and subplots being tightly intertwined and held together by the primary plot.

The majority of reviewers perceived the early episodes of Madlax as boring and too slow-paced, but some of the same critics later remarked that the prolonged exposition is crucial to the unusual finale of the series, which fully establishes the series' own identity and sets it apart from other works. According to them, after the initial volume, the story gets better and better with every new episode, though some have been dissatisfied with its "pseudo-existentialistic" ending. Erica Friedman, the president of Yuricon, highly praised Kuroda's script, naming it "the best writing that Bee Train has done". Professional reviewers welcomed the increased number of sympathetic characters, especially the distinguishable male ones (Friday, Carrossea, Colonel Burton), as opposed to stormtrooper-like operatives of Soldats in Noir, but the female character designs were still said to be much more detailed (to the point of fanservice in the case of Madlax) than the more generic male characters.

The high quality of the animation in Madlax was generally acknowledged. On the negative side, the episodes that involve computer use and hacking received criticism for their lack of realism. In terms of soundtrack, Madlax has not become as innovative as Noir, with critics suggesting its OST to be a blend of Noir and .hack//Sign styles. Nevertheless, the reviewers acknowledged its superiority over the majority of contemporary works. The English translation released by ADV Films was praised for preserving most of the series' original stylistic aspects and inviting veteran voice actors for the dub. Reviewers went as far as to suggest that several English voices (especially Mike Kleinhenz's) match the characters better than the Japanese ones. Others, however, criticized the dub, e.g. Carl Kimlinger of Anime News Network in his 2009 review of the series rated the performance as "wildly uneven, ranging from good ... to plain amateurish", citing "delivery issues" as main problem of the dub.

The initial slow pacing, especially compared to the first episodes of Noir, became a main reason why the audience often dropped watching Madlax before it could present its later story turns which eventually resulted in the moderate success of the series. Among other suggested reasons behind the mediocre popularity of the show were: the market saturation, which resulted from other anime series attempting to repeat the success of Noir since 2001; the expectable disinterest against a "Noir remake", found among the fans of the first series; the over-the-top action scenes that some felt to be ridiculous; and its unconventional genre, which straddled Madlax uncomfortably between fans of mystical science fiction and those who prefer Noir's strict realism.
