= Music of Heat Guy J =

This article lists the albums and singles attributed to the anime series Heat Guy J.

== Soundtrack albums ==
=== Heat Guy J: Original Soundtrack – Burn ===
Heat Guy J: Original Soundtrack – Burn

Soundtrack album by Try Force
- Released: December 25, 2002; August 19, 2003 (U.S.)
- Recorded: 2002
- Studios: Sound Valley Studio; Landmark Studio; Studio Greenbird
- Genres: Anime soundtrack; hard rock
- Length: 57:47; 57:48 (U.S.)
- Labels: Lantis; Pioneer Entertainment (U.S.)
- Producers: Try Force; WYSE; Yuki Kajiura

Heat Guy J: Original Soundtrack – Burn is the sole soundtrack album of Heat Guy J, released by Lantis on December 25, 2002, and by Pioneer Entertainment in the U.S. on August 19, 2003. It contains the background music composed and performed by Try Force, a side project of Japanese singer-songwriter Hironobu Kageyama. The U.S. version replaces the first ending theme "Kokoro no Sukima" by WYSE with the second ending theme "Hikari" by Saeko Chiba.

==== Track listing ====
All music is composed by Try Force, except where indicated.

No.	Title	Lyrics	Music	Artist	Length
1.	"Tribe" (Main Theme of HGJ)				3:10
2.	"Face" (90 Sec. Edit)				1:35
3.	"Rainbow Gate Park"				4:00
4.	"Bay Side Slider"				3:10
5.	"Smoke"				2:30
6.	"Plastic Cowboy"				2:37
7.	"Death Metal Riot"				3:16
8.	"Mad City Sunset" (Type 1)				2:18
9.	"Backstreet Guys"				3:13
10.	"Interchange"				2:17
11.	"God Never Knows"				3:30
12.	"Fragmentation"				3:38
13.	"Slow Dance"				1:31
14.	"Shadow Hunter"				2:47
15.	"Black Box"				2:45
16.	"Mad City Sunset" (Type 2)				4:07
17.	"Full Moon Serenade (Note: Misspelled "Full Moon Selenade" on the Japanese release.)"				3:05
18.	"Omerta (Family Affair)"				4:25
19.	"Rock and Roll Hard"				2:21
20.	"Kokoro no Sukima (心の隙間; "Gap in the Heart")" (90 Sec. Edit)	Takuma	Takuma	WYSE	1:32
Total length:					57:47

U.S. version
No.	Title	Lyrics	Music	Artist	Length
20.	"Hikari (ひかり; "Light")" (90 Sec. Edit)	Yuki Kajiura	Kajiura	Saeko Chiba	1:33
Total length:					57:48

==== Personnel ====
Try Force

- Hironobu Kageyama – lead vocals, guitar
- Kenichi Sudoh – keyboards, backing vocals
- Yohgo Kohno – guitar, keyboards, backing vocals
- Yoshichika Kuriyama – synthesizers

WYSE

- Tsukimori – lead vocals
- Takuma – bass, backing vocals
- Hiro – guitar
- Mori – guitar
- Kenji – drums

== Singles ==
=== "Face" ===
"Face"

Single by Try Force

from the album Heat Guy J: Original Soundtrack – Burn
- Language: Japanese
- B-side: "Inside Touch"
- Released: October 23, 2002
- Recorded: 2002
- Genre: J-pop; hard rock; anison
- Length: 18:39
- Label: Lantis
- Songwriter: Try Force
- Producer: Try Force

"Face" is the first single for Heat Guy J by Try Force, released by Lantis on October 23, 2002. It features the series opening theme, plus the image song "Inside Touch".

==== Track listing ====
All tracks are written by Try Force.

No.	Title	Length
1.	"Face"	5:04
2.	"Inside Touch"	4:17
3.	"Face" (Instrumental)	5:04
4.	"Inside Touch" (Instrumental)	4:14
Total length:		18:39

=== "Hikari" ===
"Hikari"

Single by Saeko Chiba

from the album Melody
- Language: Japanese
- B-side: "Hello Goodbye"
- Released: January 22, 2003
- Recorded: 2002
- Genre: J-pop; anison
- Length: 18:40
- Label: Lantis
- Songwriter: Yuki Kajiura
- Producer: Yuki Kajiura

Saeko Chiba singles chronology
"Sayonara" (2002)	"Hikari" (2003)	"Ice Cream" (2003)

"Hikari" (ひかり; lit. 'Light') is the second single for Heat Guy J and the sixth single by Japanese voice actress and singer Saeko Chiba, released by Lantis on January 22, 2003. Written and produced by Yuki Kajiura, the song was the series' ending theme from episodes 14 to 25. Chiba also voiced Kyoko Milchan in the series.

The single peaked at No. 163 on Oricon's weekly singles chart.

==== Track listing ====
All tracks are written by Yuki Kajiura.

No.	Title	Length
1.	""Hikari" (ひかり; "Light")"	4:56
2.	"Hello Goodbye"	4:26
3.	"Hikari" (Off Vocal)	4:55
4.	"Hello Goodbye" (Off Vocal)	4:23
Total length:		18:40

=== Charts ===
Chart (2003)	Peak position
Japan (Oricon)	163
