= W Wish =

Japanese anime series

- Promotional image of the series

W〜ウイッシュ〜
- Genre: Comedy, Drama, Fantasy, Harem, Mystery
- Video game
- Developer: Princess Soft
- Platform: PlayStation 2
- Released: September 30, 2004
- Anime television series
- Directed by: Osamu Sekita
- Produced by: Saburo Omiya; Takashi Nakanishi
- Written by: Katsumi Hasegawa
- Music by: Ryo Sakai
- Studio: Picture Magic; Trinet Entertainment
- Original network: KIDS Station
- Original run: 3 October 2004 – 26 December 2004
- Episodes: 13

W Wish (W〜ウイッシュ〜, pronounced Double Wish) is a Japanese anime television series which aired as half of the Princess Hour with Final Approach as its second feature. It aired between October and December 2004. Like Final Approach, the show was based on a video game by the same name published by Trinet Entertainment.

== Summary ==
Junna Tōno has a twin sister named Senna. He is an ordinary student at Sakurahama Private High School. However, in the past, a traffic accident deprived him of his parents and his memory. Junna survived the accident and since then, he lived only with his sister, though he's been looked after by his relatives.

His present life with Senna at the same high school is so pleasant that he can forget his severe past. However, Junna begins to recall the memories he lost in the accident. He enjoys the happy and pleasant days, but he is tossed by his past, his present, and his future. What is the truth hidden in his memory?

== Characters ==
Junna Tōno (遠野潤和, Tōno Junna) Voiced by: Jun Fukuyama

The male protagonist of the anime. He is a very popular boy with both his female classmates and some of his male peers. However, things were not what they seem to be just because of him and Senna. He was forced to make a difficult decision in the end, to choose to live in a world with Senna, or a world with his parents and Haruhi as his sister.

Senna Tōno (遠野泉奈, Tōno Senna) Voiced by: Ai Shimizu

The twin sister to Junna. Because their parents died in a car crash, Senna and her brother live together alone in a house. Senna and Junna support and rely on each other, and due to this Senna is very fond of her Onii-chan. However, Senna's existence is doubted as she does not exist in the real world, only in a world which she and Junna had created by their wish, they both wished that Senna will exist, thus, creating a world where she existed. Sadly, a compensation is required to make up for the wish, so their parents had ceased to exist in the created world as well as Haruhi, who was her sister, had become Junna's childhood friend instead. She was supposed to be Junna's twin sister in the real world too, but she was not born, which is the reason she did not exist in the original world and make the wish.

Sana Fujie (藤枝彩夏, Fujie Sana) Voiced by: Tomoko Kaneda

First grade of the middle school division. She is in the Help & Literature club. She has a bright attitude and is always trying to help but always ended up making things worse instead.

Akino Iida (飯田秋乃, Iida Akino) Voiced by: Yuuka Nanri

Class representative of Junna's class. Although she loves supernatural things, she is also very scared of them.

Haruhi Inohara (井ノ原春陽, Inohara Haruhi) Voiced by: Ryōko Shintani

She just transferred to Junna's school (Sakurahama Private School). A childhood friend of Junna, who calls Junna her "Onii-chan". She's quite attached to Junna. She is actually Junna's sister in the original world but became a childhood friend in the created world. She was also not supposed to exist in the created world but came to search for Junna, who had disappeared suddenly in the original world.

Tomokazu Kishida (岸田智一, Kishida Tomokazu) Voiced by: Yoshinori Fujita

Junna's friend, Tomo's twin brother. He looks like he's sexually attracted towards Junna.

Tomo Kishida (岸田智, Kishida Tomo) Voiced by: Miyu Matsuki

Twin sister of Junna's friend Tomokazu-kun. She seems to have a serious personality and stoic expressions. She is also the Keeper of Time.

Tsubasa Ōtori (鳳つばさ, Ōtori Tsubasa) Voiced by: Saeko Chiba

The school's "idol girl"; rich, intelligent, and attractive. She belongs to the Help & Literature club.

== Episode list ==
No.	Title	Original release date
1	"Junna and Senna" "Junna to Senna" (潤和と泉奈)	October 3, 2004
Junna and Senna are twin siblings that live alone. Shortly after the exams, there will be a Cherry Blossom Summer Festival at school, and Senna is excited to create memories with a reluctant Junna. Junna's homeroom teacher calls the twins over to the office to propose that they could live at the school because she is concerned about their situation. Junna doesn't recall the memories of the accident in which his parents died, but he refuses saying that he is encouraged to work hard to support his living because of Senna's existence.
2	"The Help Club" "Tasukete, O tasuke Kurabu" (助けて お助けクラブ)	October 10, 2004
Akino, the class representative of Junna's class, has decided that the theme of their activity for the Cherry Blossom Summer Festival is a haunted house. While the class groans, a student named Sana appears at Junna's class and asks him to come with her to the Helpers Club (formerly the Literature Club). It turns out that the president of the club is the most popular girl at the school, Tsubasa. Tsubasa explains the purpose of the club was to help others, and with the preparations for the Cherry Blossom Summer Festival, she believes that this is a good opportunity to get more members. She requests for Junna's help, knowing him to be very hard-working to support himself and his sister. Flattered, Junna accepts, and is given the job to collect news on the all activities in the festival. Meanwhile, Senna, who had spotted Sana dragging Junna, had eavesdropped on the conversation and is slightly bothered by it.
3	"Another Sister" "Mou Ichinin no Imouto" (もう一人の妹)	October 17, 2004
Junna runs into Tomo, an anti-social classmate of his who refuses to participate in the class activity. In response to this, Junna encourages her to assist and manages to help land her in a suitable role for the haunted house. Junna goes to report the Cooking Club's activity, where Tomokazu, Tomo's identical twin brother, embraces him. When Junna pushes away Tomokazu, Tomokazu's apron is accidentally soaked with soy sauce. Both Tomokazu and Senna are disappointed by this because they have to make more aprons for the rest of the club members. At the sound of trouble, Sana quickly arrives to help, but she ends up causing a fire, resulting in the arrival of the police. The officer, Yuuko, scolds the group, but also tells Junna that she had brought along his childhood friend. Junna and Senna are led outside to meet this new girl, and in turn, she addresses Junna as her older brother and hugs him. Although Junna does not remember who she is, he remembers her name, and this worries Senna.
4	"Pressing Anxiety" "oshiyoseru fuan" (押し寄せる不安)	October 24, 2004
Senna is disquieted at how much time Junna and Haruhi are spending together. Akino asks Senna for assistance because she cannot locate Junna to ask for his. She explains that the haunted house is short on decorations, and since Junna and Senna's parents are archaeologists, they might have materials that they could use. Senna leads Akino and Tomokazu to the mansion-like home she and Junna live in, and reluctantly gives Akino permission to borrow artifacts. When Tomokazu brings up the topic of club members staying at school overnight to finish constructing their club activities, Senna decides to go, despite the Cooking Club being ready. Meanwhile, Haruhi asks Junna to be her date for the Cherry Blossom Summer Festival, but Junna declines because he doesn't remember too much about her.
5	"Night before the Cherry Blossom Summer Festival..." "sakura natsu giwa zenya..." (桜夏際前夜...)	October 31, 2004
While making the last touches to the haunted house at night, Akino suddenly injures her leg and Junna carries her away. Haruhi becomes jealous and tries to hurt herself so Junna will carry her as well. Senna is angry that Haruhi is causing so much trouble and confronts her, and before their argument escalates, Yuuko arrives and orders Haruhi to go home. Relieved, Junna takes a break at the school roof from his work, where he sees Tomo. As the two stargaze, Tomo sagely tells Junna not to be afraid because she will always watch over him. Senna comes to the school roof, causing Junna to end his break, and she asks him if they'll be together as siblings. Junna agrees, and the two help finish the haunted house.
6	"A Memory Amidst The Shadows" "yami no naka no kioku" (闇の中の記憶)	November 7, 2004
Senna wakes Junna up for the Cherry Blossom Summer Festival. Just as Junna promised, the two spend the entire festival together. When Haruhi shows up, she cannot locate Junna, and Junna does not hear her calling for him. When night falls, Senna tells Junna that she's happy he kept their promise, but an image of Haruhi flashes through his mind. Junna is suddenly concerned about Haruhi and his past, but Senna tries to reassure him that he doesn't need to remember everything. Just as the fireworks begin, Junna's memory suddenly flashes before his eyes, causing him to pass out.
7	"Summer! Ocean! Swimsuits!!" "Natsu da! Umi da! Mizugi da!" (夏だ!海だ!水着だ!!)	November 14, 2004
Tsubasa invites everyone to her beach resort for summer vacation. She decides to form a beach volleyball competition, and Haruhi suggests that the winner shall have one request. Haruhi and Senna end up being stuck together as a team for the competition, but easily win, fueled by the determination to have Junna. Haruhi immediately requests that Junna should have a date with her, and hurriedly drags him away. During their date, Junna suddenly gets a flash of his mysterious dreams and ends up fainting. When Junna wakes up, Senna uses her wish from the volleyball game to request that Junna shouldn not force himself. Inwardly, Junna is still thinking about his lost memories, but is troubled with that if he does get them back, things will change.
8	"Photo Album of Memories" "omoide no arubamu" (思い出のアルバム)	November 21, 2004
Sana brings photos from their beach vacation to Junna and Senna's house. Senna excitedly wants to put them in photo albums immediately, and hearing this, Junna believes that if he sees the old photo albums, he may be able to recover his memory. However, Senna claims to have thrown them out by accident, but decides that they should buy one to create memories. At the bookstore, Junna notices Tomo walking by and follows her, but she mysteriously vanishes. While walking home with Senna, Junna still wonders where Tomo went. They encounter a man named Koutarou Ryuuoku, who had participated in a study with the twins' father. He tells them about a dial that their father found at an excavation site, and because the twins were present at the time, he asks them if they remembered anything from it. While Junna tries to remember, Senna tearfully exclaims that she doesn't know anything and retreats to her room.
9	"Hidden Past" "kakusa re ta kako" (隠された過去)	November 28, 2004
Senna refuses to come out of her room, leaving Junna troubled as he realizes he does not know too much about her. Junna finds the dial Koutarou was talking about in his room, along with old photo albums. The photo albums have no photos of Senna, but have pictures of Haruhi instead. Shocked, Junna takes a walk outside, confused as to why this is so. He happens to meet Haruhi by chance, and the two head out to a café. Junna feels that Haruhi understands why Senna was not in the photo albums and asks her why. Haruhi sadly responds that Senna was not supposed to exist at all. Tomo appears behind Junna explains that like Junna, Senna doesn't have a past, but she does not have a future as well. As Senna emerges from her room, she notices the photo albums and realizes that Junna is coming close to knowing the truth.
10	"Distorted World" "igami yuku sekai" (歪みゆく世界)	December 5, 2004
Haruhi apologetically tells Junna that she cannot explain everything to him and he must be the one to choose his future, but she'll accept whatever he decides. No later, the town is suddenly engulfed in a fog, and because of this, everyone is instructed to stay home. Junna sees Tomo again and follows her down an alley, remembering that she told him that she'll watch over him. On his way, he does not see Senna, who has come to talk to Junna with the dial. Junna ends up on the school roof, and Tomo reveals herself as the Keeper of Time. She says that only Junna can decide what he want, and takes him back to the time of his childhood, on the day he was separated from his parents and Haruhi.
11	"Senna's Truth" "Senna no Shinjitsu" (泉奈の真実)	December 12, 2004
On the day Junna was separated by his real family, they were at an excavation site. Junna's father had shown him a dial he found and told him that the dial can grant a person's one strongest desire. Junna had wished to meet Senna, and Senna shared the same wish; as a result, the current world Junna lived in was born. In the present, Senna finds Junna at the park and reveals that when she and Junna were conceived, she died, but existed as a soul. Junna has always felt her presence, so that was why he knew of her existence. Tomo explains that since Junna and Senna's wish was granted, the dial has to take a compensation to create the world, which was the death of his parents and Haruhi living in Junna's dreams. Surprisingly, Haruhi was not supposed to exist in this new world, but because Junna had abandoned her in his dream world, she came searching for him, becoming his childhood friend in this world. Tomo informs Junna that because Haruhi and Senna cannot co-exist in the same plane, the balance between the worlds are starting to collapse, explaining the fog that has emerged in the city. She gives Junna two choices: stay with his current lifestyle with Senna or return to his old one with his parents and Haruhi.
12	"Imminent Decision" "semara reru sentaku" (迫られる選択)	December 19, 2004
The next morning, Senna resumes life pretending as though nothing has happened, but Junna is fed up with it. He is pressured to quickly make his decision as the world is slowly being destroyed. He is angry that his selfish wish with Senna caused his parents to die and lashes out at her for her indifferent attitude. Unmasking herself in tears, Senna says that she knew the truth from the beginning and had hidden it for so long because she didn't want Junna to be in pain. Junna expresses his desire to be with Senna together, but he wants Haruhi and his parents to be exist as his family as well. He realizes that perhaps the dial can grant his wish and goes to ask it, only to no avail. Meanwhile, Senna walks outside, where she meets Haruhi, and the two sisters walk off together.
13	"Three Desires" "Mitsu no Omoi" (三つの思い)	December 26, 2004
Junna recalls that there is something more to than asking the dial one wish and forces himself to remember how it granted his wish before. Slowly, he understands that the dial will grant only wishes that more than one people share. Desperately, he looks for Senna to help him before the world is destroyed. He finds Haruhi and Senna in the park and instructs them to wish with him on the dial. In the end, Haruhi stayed as Junna's childhood friend while Senna turned out to be his future little sister.

== Music ==
- Opening Theme: "KIZUNA" by Ayane
- Ending Theme: "Omoide good night" by tiaraway
