= List of Blood Lad episodes =

Blood Lad
- Cover of the first Blu-ray volume released by Kadokawa Shoten in Japan on September 27, 2013.
- No. of episodes: 10 + OVA

Release
- Original network: tvk
- Original release: July 7 – September 8, 2013

Blood Lad is a 2013 Japanese anime series based on the manga written and illustrated by Yuuki Kodama. In another dimension, otaku vampire, Staz Charlie Blood and his gang stumble upon Fuyumi Yanagi—a high school girl who somehow finds her way into their dimension from the human world. Fuyumi's presence induces a vampiric infatuation from Staz, but his time with her is cut short after she is killed by a rogue carnivorous demon plant and turns into a ghost, leaving Staz determined to resurrect her as a living human.

The anime is produced by Brain's Base and directed by Shigeyuki Miya, with script writing by Takeshi Konuta and character designs by Kenji Fujisaki. The series premiered on tvk on July 7, 2013, with later airings on Tokyo MX, Sun TV and BS11. The series ran for ten episodes, ending on September 8, 2013, and was followed by an original video animation on December 1, 2013. Kadokawa Shoten released the series in Japan on 5 Blu-ray and DVD volumes between September 27, 2013 and January 31, 2014. The series was licensed by Viz Media in North America and was streamed with English subtitles on Viz Anime and in an English dub on Neon Alley. Anime Limited also licensed the series for a home media release in the United Kingdom. Hanabee Entertainment later obtained the series for release in Australia and New Zealand.

The opening theme is "ViViD" by May'n while the ending theme is "Bloody Holic" by Yuuka Nanri.

== Episode list ==
No.	Official English title (Note: All English titles are taken from Viz Media.) Original Japanese title	Original air date (Note: As Blood Lad premiered in tvk's Sunday 24:30 (00:30 JST) time slot, the episodes technically aired the days following the ones listed.)	Refs.
1	"She's a Skeleton Now"; Transliteration: "Hone Deshita." (Japanese: 骨でした。)	July 7, 2013	
In another dimension, vampire and boss of the Demon World's Eastern District, Staz Charlie Blood lives as a normal otaku. Staz's second-in-command, Deku, informs him of their capture of a living human girl, Fuyumi Yanagi, and brings her over to Staz's apartment. Upon meeting Fuyumi, Staz becomes infatuated and engages her in an otaku discussion. Meanwhile, Deku and the other gang members get into a fight with a challenger to Staz's leadership who wields demon plants. Deku calls Staz for help, who aids them after suppressing his vampiric urges from Fuyumi. Staz easily kills the challenger and when he and Deku return to the apartment they horrifically discover that Fuyumi had been killed by one of the rogue demon plants. After finding her bones and strangely enough, Fuyumi herself on Staz's bed, Deku deduces that she became a ghost and Starz resolves to resurrect her. Fuyumi later remembers how she stumbled into the Demon World and takes Staz to a back alley where they discover a rare dimensional portal known as the "Black Curtain". Staz stops Fuyumi from entering the portal, explaining its strange nature, before expressing a desire to visit the Human World himself. Staz then takes Fuyumi to a local cafe where he has the owners, Saty and Mamejirō, determine the nature of her existence via their Third Eye magic. As Staz reveals his intention of going to the human world to a panicked Mamejirō, Deku enters with a new gang recruit, Mimic Yoshida. Mamejirō outlines the repercussions of Staz's departure but he compensates by making Mimic the new boss, who subsequently transforms into Staz's own likeness and they decide to use him as a body double in Staz's absence. Afterwards, at a welcoming party for Mimic, Fuyumi wonders if Staz can really resurrect her but Deku reassures that Staz sees his goals through. In the epilogue, Staz and Fuyumi step through the Black Curtain.
2	"Back Home, But Not Really"; Transliteration: "Tadaima wa Iwanai" (Japanese: ただいまは言わない)	July 14, 2013	
The Black Curtain exits inside Fuyumi's room and Staz immediately begins criticizing her plain lifestyle. Afterwards, Staz suggests that he enroll as a transfer student at Fuyumi's high school and they run into her upset father but Staz sprays him with his diluted saliva altering his behavior and explaining that it possesses the property of controlling humans. Later, Staz enters into a fit of excitement while marveling at the human world, and upon arriving at Fuyumi's school, sprays its entire population with his saliva thus allowing her to fit in as if she never left. Fuyumi soon learns that the chemical only creates false memories, at which point, her body starts disappearing much to her shock. Staz has her suck some of his blood, which restores her demon existence. Afterwards, Staz finds himself strangely uninterested in sucking the blood of humans other than Fuyumi. Later they return to Fuyumi's house to discover a woman calling herself Bell Hydra. Bell reveals that she didn't leave the Black Curtain out by choice and that she had known about Staz's doppelganger to which Staz wrongly deduces that she intends to blackmail him into giving up his territory, before she uses spatial magic to transport him to point in the human world and threatens to kill Fuyumi if he doesn't get an item from a demon clothing store for her. Afterwards, Bell explains that she had been looking for the person who stole the Black Curtain from her. Meanwhile, Staz enters into a pointless fight with the store owner, until Bell and Fuyumi show up with the latter explaining that Bell had only been testing Staz in her search for someone with powerful magic. Finally Bell reveals that the only thing capable of bringing Fuyumi back to life is "The Book of Human Resurrection" which she had sold to the boss of the Demon World's Western District—Wolf. In the epilogue, a shocked Staz reveals that Wolf is his old friend and rival.
3	"You Had It All Along"; Transliteration: "Motten jan" (Japanese: 持ってんじゃん)	July 21, 2013	
Wolf continues to expand his territory within the Demon World while Staz enlists Mamejirō along with Fuyumi to help track him down. Meanwhile, Bell still suspicious of Staz, continues to observe him. Staz and co. board a special demon carriage and end up meeting Wolf en route to another territorial battle. After a bit of casual rivalry, Staz tries to get Wolf to help him in obtaining the book which the latter deems too frivolous an exploit of his time. Seeing no other alternative, Staz proposes that they have a competition, with Wolf wagering to help Staz find the book should Staz win, and Staz wagering Fuyumi herself should Wolf win. Afterwards Staz starts preparing for a bowling competition, elaborating to Fuyumi, a plan to cheat using his manipulative magic although Wolf has a boxing match prepared instead. As they both step into the ring, Staz begins the fight with a clinch tactic but Wolf ends up dominating the rest of the match, believing that Staz would use up all of his magic healing his wounds. However in a dramatic turn of events, Wolf ends up being the one whose magic depletes since Staz had bitten him during their clinch and had been absorbing his magic ever since. As Staz starts gaining the upper hand, Wolf enters a partial werewolf transformation and begins patronizing Staz's motives of helping Fuyumi, claiming that Staz only uses his vampiric powers when it benefits him. This angers Staz to the point of almost killing Wolf with his ZIP spell, although the match is stopped by a tearful Fuyumi along with Bell who transports them all to another building. Here Bell reveals that she had the book all along and was merely toying with the group. Finally obtaining the book, Staz and co. try and fail to read its anagrammatic text, with the only person capable of deciphering it being the book's author which shocks Staz when he turns back to the first page. In the epilogue, Staz grows terrified when he learns that the book's author is non other than his older brother and resident of the Demon World Acropolis—Braz D. Blood.
4	"To Demon World Acropolis"; Transliteration: "Dendō Makai e" (Japanese: 殿堂魔界へ)	July 28, 2013	
Staz's reluctance to visit Braz in Acropolis enrages Wolf who forces him to finish that which he had started while also threatening Bell to use her Spatial Magic to take Staz to Acropolis. Wolf then kicks Staz into a newly opened portal where he ends up in Bell's bedroom. Here Bell once again tries testing Staz but he instead questions her true motive. Bell reveals that Staz's magic acts as though it leaks out of a seal prompting him to explain his history with Braz. Staz explains that when he was younger, Braz conducted numerous torturous experiments on him for the purpose of sealing away his magic, which Braz had managed by shooting a bullet directly into his heart thus creating a seal that only he can remove. Upon learning this, Bell finally confirms that Staz isn't the magic thief since he simply wasn't powerful enough to steal her Black Curtain, but this only makes her more curious about Staz's true power. Bell then tries to provoke Staz by locking him in her spatial grid room until he promises to have Braz remove the seal. Staz agrees and states that when his seal is removed he will use his full magic power and actually steal her spatial magic. Afterwards Bell treats Staz to sushi and begins falling for him against her better judgement. Meanwhile, back in the Demon World, Fuyumi's body starts vanishing once more, prompting Wolf to hurriedly take her to the mad-scientist: Franken Stein. Finally Bell takes Staz to Acropolis and decides to cause some trouble to force him into breaking the magical seal. Staz decides to sneak into Braz's castle but ends up being caught by his little sister and Warden of the Demon World—Liz T. Blood who had disowned him because of his betrayal and imprisons him in the prison known as "Liz's Toy Box". Staz's fellow inmates then trick him into pushing a suspicious button in his cell which opens to a corridor. In the epilogue, after being led to another room, Staz once again encounters Liz who explains that a prisoner can leave at any time they wish, providing they can defeat her zombie subordinates in battle; a feat which not a single inmate has yet to accomplish.
5	"Unidentified Demon Object"; Transliteration: "Mikakunin Majin Buttai" (Japanese: 未確認魔人物体)	August 4, 2013	
Liz's zombies easily defeat Staz although he repeatedly challenges them with the same result. Meanwhile Franken deduces that Fuyumi's condition can be stabilized with a dose of Staz's blood. He further explains to Wolf that ghosts have the unique ability of becoming a single demon species by absorbing their magic; digressing that if Fuyumi absorbs all of Staz's magic she may be able to rival another demon. Back in Acropolis, Braz learns of Staz's arrival and the Blood family reunites, with the former refusing to help Staz. After a little sibling rivalry involving Liz's envy of Braz's preference to Staz, Braz proposes Staz with a deal. Meanwhile, Bell reveals to an angered Wolf of Franken's hidden intention of using Fuyumi to combat a failed experiment called Artificial Demon No. 9: Akim Papradon, a monstrosity he created using bodily pieces of other demons. Seeking stronger parts however, Akim escaped from Franken's laboratory and began hunting demons. Wolf makes a deal with Franken that should he defeat Akim, he would return Fuyumi to being a regular ghost. Simultaneously, Braz explains the same matter to Staz, proposing to teach him the resurrection spell should he help defeat Akim, which the latter refuses. Braz continues that after unlocking Staz's tremendous magic power via his experiments, he was forced to seal it until a time when Staz could properly wield it. Refusing to have the seal removed, Braz has Liz's zombies beat Staz to the point of having to use his true power. Meanwhile, with Bell's help, Wolf arrives at the North District in his search for Akim and engages in a battle with the territory's boss. However, much to Wolf's horror, Akim suddenly appears by grotesquely ripping through the boss. Finally, as the zombies overwhelm Staz, Braz removes the bullet seal, awakening Staz's true power and thus allowing him to easily eradicate the zombies. In the epilogue, Braz picks up the crushed boulder from the ground after telling Liz not to lose it, being a reminder of Staz's true power.
6	"That's Friendship"; Transliteration: "Sore ga Dachi" (Japanese: それがダチ)	August 11, 2013	
With his power now unlocked, Staz reluctantly leaves Acropolis to face Akim as per Braz's deal with him. Meanwhile, Wolf and Akim begin their battle with the latter specializing in spatial magic. Much to Wolf's shock, Akim reveals that he is merely demon phantom manipulating the dead pieces of a physical body via magic. Wolf then releases the magic stored in his pipe and enters into a full werewolf transformation. Meanwhile, Bell traps Franken in the grid room, forcing him to reveal everything about Akim's spatial magic. Meanwhile, Wolf and Akim engage in fierce hand to hand combat, with the former supposedly emerging victorious after using his claws to slice Akim to pieces. At the same time, Staz shows up just as Akim starts putting his body back together and enters the battle by knocking Akim into the northern wasteland before switching with Wolf, whose magic completely depletes. Staz unleashes a barrage of magical punches against Akim, none of which connect due to the latter realizing Staz's reckless fighting style. Insulted, Staz releases his magic which takes the form of a large golden hand and annihilates Akim in one powerful attack. In the attack's wake, Staz allows Akim to piece himself back together, admitting that his power is a burden before seemingly killing Akim with his ZIP spell. Afterwards, Wolf approaches Staz and challenges him to a battle. Meanwhile, Bell delivers the pieces of Akim to Franken after having captured him whilst attempting to escape Staz's ZIP and questions them on Akim's spatial magic, learning that Franken had obtained Akim's core body with the spatial magic stolen from her by an unknown third party. Braz and Liz then show up and imprison Franken and Akim in the Toy Box before approaching Staz, who refuses to fight his friend Wolf with his full power. Finally, Braz asks to meet the girl whom Staz wishes to resurrect. In the epilogue, Wolf loses his sense of direction on his way back to the West District.
7	"Liz, For the First Time"; Transliteration: "Hajimete no Rizu" (Japanese: はじめてのリズ)	August 18, 2013	
Bell delivers Braz and co. back to Franken's examination room where Fuyumi and Mamejirō wait. As Braz meets Fuyumi for the first time, his initial interaction with her angers Staz, prompting him to reject Braz's help and uses his temporary method of restoring Fuyumi with his own blood. Afterwards the group heads back to the Third Eye Cafe after Braz makes a request to see Fuyumi's original body. Bell also reveals her suspicion of Braz to Staz and gives him a magical bell which would summon her when Fuyumi requires assistance. Eventually Braz takes a sample of magic from Fuyumi and explains that he should be able to resurrect her by converting her magic into a soul and replacing it inside a replicated body. Having obtained all he needs, Braz leaves for Acropolis while leaving Liz behind and unbeknownst to Staz, plans on extracting Staz's magic from Fuyumi's sample for his own experiments. Afterwards Staz shows Liz around the Eastern District and buys her a stuffed animal before returning to the cafe for a bite to eat made by Fuyumi. Some time later, Staz deduces that Braz had forbidden Liz from returning to Acropolis until his experiments are complete and allows her to stay at his place whilst introducing her to his otaku collection. Meanwhile, a strange blond man observed the group. Afterwards Fuyumi and Liz start bonding by taking a bath and even sleeping together. The next day, Liz wakes up to a note explaining that Fuyumi seems to have left and asks that they not follow her, but Staz and co. deduce that she had probably been kidnapped and set out to search for clues. Liz reveals that Braz had planted a tracker on Fuyumi and Staz pleads with her to return to Acropolis and get Braz's help. Meanwhile, Mamejirō, Saty, Yoshida and Deku obtain a lead on the blond suspect who was last seen heading towards the southern part of the Demon World. In the epilogue, with his magic now granting him the ability of flight, Staz takes off in search of Fuyumi.
8	"Two is a Treasure"; Transliteration: "Futari wa Torejā" (Japanese: ふたりはトレジャー)	August 25, 2013	
Liz arrives in Acropolis and is immediately confronted by Acropolis Policewoman, Constable Beros. Beros allows her re-entry into the district on the condition that she take her to Braz so that he can be arrested for illegally leaving Acropolis. Afterwards, Liz informs Staz that she had failed to locate Fuyumi using Braz's equipment while he is simultaneously approached by a member of the Southern District's tropical territory who takes him to the territory's snowman boss. Here Staz learns that the blond hairred-man called Knell Hydra lives in the inaccessible Dimensional Highway. Meanwhile, as Knell stops off at a ramen restaurant Fuyumi gains the opportunity to signal Bell using the bell she had given her. Meanwhile, Liz acquires Fuyumi's position and relays this to Staz. As Knell flees in response to Fuyumi's signal, he is intercepted by Bell where she learns that he was simply running an errand for their mother. Just then Staz appears and angrily demands that they return Fuyumi prompting Bell to aid her brother and imprisons Staz in her Grid Room hence allowing Knell to escape using spatial magic. Here, Staz tries and fails to reason with Bell, angering her to the point of goading him into a battle when he prioritizes Fuyumi above herself. Bell then materializes her spatial magic and seems to gain the upper hand on Staz until he traps her in his own magic causing her to escape by abandoning her lower body clothes including her carrying bag. However, when Staz begins to investigate the bag and happens upon her diary, Bell immediately surrenders to prevent him from seeing its contents. Afterwards, as Bell takes Staz to Fuyumi, she laments that he still hasn't noticed her feelings for him. However Staz surprises her by realizing that however good his intentions initially seem they always invite unforeseen consequences and allows Bell to vent her frustration on him. In the epilogue, as Staz and Bell cross the portal into the Dimensional Highway, the latter almost reveals her feelings for Staz due to his sincerity.
9	"Sins of the Eye Glasses"; Transliteration: "Megane no Tsumi" (Japanese: メガネの罪)	September 1, 2013	
Upon arriving at the Acropolis Palace, Braz has a flashback whereby he witnessed the death of his father, the previous king, at the hand of present Acropolis King: Wolf-Daddy. Meanwhile Knell and Fuyumi meet Bell and Staz at the Hydra Palace and realize that they know nothing about the Hydra siblings' mother: Neyn's intentions. Afterwards, Neyn has a rather heartfelt reunion with Fuyumi much to the latter's confusion while the Hydra butler explains that Braz and Neyn are acquaintances. Elsewhere, Wolf-Daddy commends Braz on his observational duties of Lower Demon World and in aiding the capture of Akim Papradon, but finds it suspicious that Akim shares the same appearance of his missing subordinate: Pantomime. Braz nonchalantly admits that he orchestrated the creation of Akim as a declaration of war against Wolf-Daddy's reign. Unbeknownst to Wolf-Daddy, Braz has Franken working on a more powerful body for Akim. Wolf-Daddy gives Braz three days by which to present his king-candidate, after which he will kill them both. Afterwards, Braz manages to escape from Beros' custody but ends up being pursued by Goyle. Meanwhile, Neyn explains the existence of doppelgängers within the Human and Demon Worlds to Staz and co. and that she encountered and fused with her own doppelgänger: Fuyumi's mother while on a trip to the Human World with a young Bell hence making the girls sisters. Elsewhere, Goyle manages to corner Braz with his Angry Spear magic and demands to know his intentions towards Wolf-Daddy. However, after deducing the nature of Goyle's magic, Braz activates his Blood Stalker magic and is able to remotely control his own blood to threaten Beros' life, prompting Goyle to back down. Finally, as Fuyumi tries to come to terms with everything that has happened to her thus far, Bell assures that once she is resurrected her memory will be erased. In the epilogue, after having been teleported to a randomly floating island within the Highway, Staz tries to determine what he really intends to do with Fuyumi before he is approached by an unknown figure. Meanwhile, after stopping Goyle's attack, Braz treats him to ice cream.
10	"The Dark Hero Rises"; Transliteration: "Dāku Hīrō Raijingu" (Japanese: ダークヒーロー・ライジング)	September 8, 2013	
Heads Hydra—master of the Hydra Territory confronts Staz. Meanwhile Deku, Yoshida and Mamejirō face the Tropical Territory who intend to conquer Staz's territory in his absence. Heads explains that after Neyn was formed, she along with himself and Fuyumi's father—Yanagi met to discuss their circumstances. Eventually Yanagi gave up Neyn to Heads in exchange that he raise Fuyumi as a normal human on his own. As Heads demands Staz's motive for resurrecting Fuyumi, the latter sincerely claims that he won't know his true feelings for her until she is resurrected. This prompts Heads to sever Neyn's eavesdrop on their interaction and tricks Staz into making a false pledge that would kill him should he go against Fuyumi's choices. Afterwards, Staz wakes up near the Hydra Territory's entrance along with Fuyumi as Heads tries to convince Neyn of his intention to allow Fuyumi to make her own choices. Meanwhile as Goyle traps Braz in his Cool Decision spell, he is rescued by Liz's arrival and they both escape using her teleportation magic. Unable to agree with Heads' gamble on Staz, Neyn starts debating with his motives in that they should protect her but he rebuffs that Yanagi is her true father. Meanwhile, back in the Eastern District, Deku, Yoshida and Mamejirō valiantly repel their would-be conquerors, while Wolf receives a letter from Acropolis. Elsewhere, Staz laments the fact that his promise to resurrect Fuyumi had done more harm to her than good, but again promises to resurrect her in addition to leaving the Hydra Territory should they both be her desire, which she accepts. As Neyn and Heads watch Fuyumi and Staz's decision, Heads ponders that Staz will have to become a true hero to face the trials that lie ahead. Meanwhile, a mysterious group of individuals fly to an unknown location aboard a blimp. In the epilogue, Braz arrives in the covert lab where Franken had been working on a new body for Akim which turns out to be his father whom he welcomes back to life.
OVA	"I'm Not a Cat"; Transliteration: "Wagahai wa Neko de wa Nai" (Japanese: 我輩は猫ではない)	December 1, 2013	
As Staz and Fuyumi are in their journey, Fuyumi has to consume Staz's blood once again to avoid disappearing and starts to become addicted to it. Meanwhile, a vampire hunter group targets Staz. While the vampire initially fights against them equally, he is weakened by a weapon made of silver and Fuyumi is kidnapped. Regardless of his weakened state, Staz heads to their headquarters where they attempt to kill him. Staz consumes their magic, leaving the leader to give up and let Staz and Fuyumi use his blimp.

== Home media ==
Kadokawa Shoten released the series in Japan on five Blu-ray and DVD volumes between September 27, 2013 and January 31, 2014. Original manga creator, Yuuki Kodama drew the box artwork of each volume. The complete series was released by Viz Media in North America on Blu-ray and DVD format on September 2, 2014. This was followed by releases by Hanabee Entertainment on January 7, 2015. and by Anime Limited on January 26, 2015. These releases contained English and Japanese audio options and English subtitles.

Kadokawa Shoten (Region 2 - Japan)
Vol.	Episodes	Artwork		Bonus disc	Release date	Ref.
Vol.	Episodes	Blu-ray	DVD	Bonus disc	Release date	Ref.
1	1, 2	Staz Charlie Blood	Staz Charlie Blood	Drama CD	September 27, 2013	
2	3, 4	Wolf	Wolf & Staz	Drama CD	October 25, 2013	
3	5, 6	Braz D. Blood & Liz T. Blood	Liz, Braz & Staz	Drama CD	November 29, 2013	
4	7, 8	Bell Hydra	Knell, Bell & Staz	Drama CD	December 27, 2013	
5	9, 10	Fuyumi Yanagi	Bell, Wolf, Fuyumi and Staz	—	January 31, 2014	

Viz Media (Region 1 - North America)
Vol.	Episodes	Blu-ray / DVD artwork	BD / DVD Release date	BD Ref.	DVD Ref.
1	1–10	Staz, Fuyumi & Wolf	September 2, 2014		

Hanabee Entertainment (Region 4 - Australia / New Zealand)
Vol.	Episodes	BD / DVD Release date	BD Ref.	DVD Ref.
1	1-10 + OVA	January 7, 2015		

Anime Limited (Region 2 - United Kingdom)
Vol.	Episodes	BD / DVD Release date	BD Ref.	DVD Ref.
1	1-10 + OVA	January 26, 2015		
