= Tamaki Nakanishi =

Japanese actress and singer (1976–2020)

- 仲西 環
- Born: February 13, 1976; Urasoe, Okinawa, Japan
- Died: March 14, 2020 (aged 44)
- Occupations: Actress; singer
- Years active: 2000–2015
- Employer: 81 Produce
- Notable work: Prétear as Shin; I"s as Itsuki Akiba; Memories Off 2nd as Tomoe Tobise; Happy Lesson as Nagatsuki Kuron; Fafner in the Azure as Tsubaki Minashiro; Yumeria as Neneko

Tamaki Nakanishi (仲西 環, Nakanishi Tamaki; February 13, 1976 – March 14, 2020) was a Japanese actress and singer from Okinawa Prefecture, affiliated with 81 Produce. She starred as Shin in Prétear, Itsuki Akiba in I"s, Tomoe Tobise in Memories Off 2nd, Nagatsuki Kuron in Happy Lesson, Tsubaki Minashiro in Fafner in the Azure, and Neneko in Yumeria, and she was one of the singers of Yumeria's opening song, "24-Jikan Aishiteru".

== Biography ==
Tamaki Nakanishi, a native of Okinawa Prefecture, was born on February 13, 1976. After voicing characters in Gravitation, Hamtaro and Bōken Jidai Katsugeki Goemon in 2000, she starred as Shin in Prétear (2001) and Itsuki Akiba in I"s (2002). She starred as Tomoe Tobise in the 2001 visual novel Memories Off 2nd, reprising her role in the 2003 anime, in Memories Off Mix, and Memories Off After Rain. She starred as Nagatsuki Kuron in Happy Lesson Advanced, Tsubaki Minashiro in Fafner in the Azure, and as Neneko in Yumeria, and she was one of the singers of the latter's opening song, "24-Jikan Aishiteru". She voiced Carbuncle and Yu in Puyo Pop Fever, Puyo Puyo! 15th Anniversary, and Puyo Puyo 7.

Nakanishi reprised her role as Tsubaki Minashiro in the 2010 film Fafner in the Azure: Dead Aggressor: Heaven and Earth and the 2015 anime sequel Fafner in the Azure: Dead Aggressor: Exodus, also voicing Orihime Minashiro in the latter. She reprised her role as Neneko in the 2012 crossover game Project X Zone. In addition to voicing Razania in Kyo Kara Maoh!, Kuroko Tetsuyanagi in Love Get Chu, Ete in Prism Ark, Ai Nanao in Kanokon, and Asato Luca in Accel World, she also voiced minor characters in Paranoia Agent, IGPX, Loveless, D.Gray-man, Powerpuff Girls Z, and Renkin 3-kyū Magical? Pokān. Nakanishi also worked in stage acting; she was part of the theatrical trio Carne, which had its first performance at Akashi Studio, Kōenji, in October 2008.

Nakanishi listed illustration as a hobby and skill.

Nakanishi died under medical care on March 14, 2020. Her funeral services were privately held and attended only by her family.

== Filmography ==
Year	Title	Role(s)	Ref
2000	Gravitation	High school girl	
2000	Hamtaro	Niki	
2001	Prétear	Shin	
2002	I"s	Itsuki Akiba	
2003	.hack//Legend of the Twilight	Hayato	
2003	Gad Guard	Satsuki Sanada	
2003	Happy Lesson Advanced	Nagatsuki Kuron	
2004	Beet the Vandel Buster	Luisa	
2004	Fafner in the Azure	Tsubaki Minashiro	
2004–2008	Kyo Kara Maoh!	Razania	
2004	Paranoia Agent	High school girl	
2004	Tactics	Shadow Lady	
2004	Yumeria	Neneko	
2005	Glass Mask	Okui	
2005	IGPX	Fangirl	
2005	Loveless	Female student	
2006	D.Gray-man	Boy	
2006	Love Get Chu	Kuroko Tetsuyanagi	
2006	Pokapoka Mori no Rascal	Rascal	
2006	Powerpuff Girls Z	Ice cream shop girl	
2006	Renkin 3-kyū Magical? Pokān	Landlady	
2007	Prism Ark	Ete	
2008	Kanokon	Ai Nanao	
2012	Accel World	Asato Luca	
2012	Project X Zone	Neneko	
2015	Fafner in the Azure: Dead Aggressor: Exodus	Tsubaki Minashiro, Orihime Minashiro	

=== Video games ===
Year	Title	Role(s)	Ref
2000	Bōken Jidai Katsugeki Goemon	Tongari	
2001	Memories Off 2nd	Tomoe Tobise	
2002	Evolution Worlds	Linear Cannon	
2003	Memories Off Mix	Tomoe Tobise	
2004	Puyo Pop Fever	Carbuncle, Yu	
2005	Memories Off After Rain	Tomoe Tobise	
2006	Puyo Puyo! 15th Anniversary	Carbuncle, Yu	
2008	Kanokon Esuii	Ai Nanao	
2009	Puyo Puyo 7	Carbuncle, Yu	

=== Animated film ===
Year	Title	Role(s)	Ref
2010	Fafner in the Azure: Dead Aggressor: Heaven and Earth	Tsubaki Minashiro	

=== OVA ===
Year	Title	Role(s)	Ref
2003	Memories Off 2nd	Tomoe Tobise	
