= Memories Off After Rain =

Set of Japanese visual novels

- Cover of Volume 1: Orizuru

メモリーズオフ After Rain (Memorīzu Obu Afuta Raenu)
- Genre: Drama, Romance
- Video game
- Developer: KID
- Genre: Visual novel
- Platform: PlayStation 2, PlayStation Portable, Microsoft Windows
- Released: JP: January 27, 2005 (Vol. 1); JP: February 24, 2005 (Vol. 2); JP: March 31, 2005 (Vol. 3)

Memories Off After Rain (メモリーズオフ After Rain, Memorīzu Obu Afuta Raenu) is a set of three Japanese romance visual novels developed by KID for the PlayStation 2. They are the sequels to Memories Off and Memories Off 2nd. The game volumes were released for the PlayStation 2 on January 27, 2005.

== Characters ==
=== After Rain Volume 1: Orizuru ===
Tomoya Mikami (三上 智也, Mikami Tomoya)
Ayaka Hizuki (桧月 彩花, Hizuki Ayaka)
Yue Imasaka (今坂 唯笑, Imasaka Yue)
Kaoru Otawa (音羽 かおる, Otawa Kaoru)
Minamo Ibuki (伊吹 みなも, Ibuki Minamo)
Koyomi Kirishima (霧島 小夜美, Kirishima Koyomi)
Shion Futami (双海 詩音, Futami Shion)
Tomoe Tobise (飛世 巴, Tobise Tomoe)
Shin Inaho (稲穂 信, Inaho Shin)

=== After Rain Volume 2: Souen ===
Ken Inami (伊波 健, Inami Ken)
Hotaru Shirakawa (白河 ほたる, Shirakawa Hotaru)
Tsubame Minami (南 つばめ, Minami Tsubame)
Takano Suzuna (寿々奈 鷹乃, Suzuna Takano)
Shizuru Shirakawa (白河 静流, Shirakawa Shizuru)
Megumi Souma (相摩 希, Souma Megumi)
Kana Maikata (舞方 香菜, Maikata Kana)
Shōta Nakamori (中森翔 太, Nakamori Shōta)
Shin Inaho (稲穂 信, Inaho Shin)

== Media ==
=== Music ===
The opening for the game is Ribbon and the ending song is After Rain, both sung by Ayane.
