= Happy Lesson =

Japanese manga series

- The Happy Lesson Region 1 DVD cover art, from the ADV Films release.
- Genre: Comedy, Drama, Harem, Slice of life
- Manga
- Written by: Mutsumi Sasaki
- Illustrated by: Shinnosuke Mori
- Published by: MediaWorks
- English publisher: NA: ADV Manga (defunct)
- Magazine: Dengeki G's Magazine
- Original run: April 1999 – September 2002
- Volumes: 2
- Original video animation
- Directed by: Takeshi Yamaguchi (#1–2); Hideki Tonokatsu (#3); Ikkō Toshida (#4); Hiroaki Shimura (#5)
- Produced by: Saburō Ōmiya; Yoshihiro Shintani (#1–3); Satoshi Hasegawa (#4); Satoshi Kodama (#5)
- Written by: Takao Yoshioka
- Music by: Yasunori Iwasaki; Kazuhiko Sawaguchi (#1–3)
- Studio: VENET (#1–3); Chaos Project (#4); Studio Kyūma (#5)
- Released: 19 July 2001 – 23 May 2003
- Episodes: 5
- Anime television series
- Directed by: Iku Suzuki
- Produced by: Saburō Ōmiya
- Written by: Takao Yoshioka
- Music by: Yasunori Iwasaki; Yūsuke Takahama; Yōichi Sakai
- Studio: Studio Hibari
- Original network: Kids Station
- Original run: 1 April 2002 – 30 June 2002
- Episodes: 13
- Anime television series

Happy Lesson Advance
- Directed by: Iku Suzuki
- Produced by: Saburō Ōmiya
- Written by: Takao Yoshioka
- Music by: Nobuya Usui; Yasunori Iwasaki; Yusuke Takahama; Yōichi Sakai
- Studio: Studio Hibari
- Original network: Kids Station
- Original run: 3 July 2003 – 28 September 2003
- Episodes: 13
- Original video animation

Happy Lesson: The Final
- Directed by: Saburō Ōmiya (Chief); Toshihiro Ishikawa
- Produced by: Toshirō Sakuma; Yūko Sakai (#1–2); Akihiko Hashimoto (#3)
- Written by: Saburō Ōmiya
- Music by: Yasunori Iwasaki
- Studio: Studio Ranmaru
- Released: 28 May 2004 – 22 October 2004
- Episodes: 3

Happy Lesson (stylized as HAPPY★LESSON) is a manga series, written by Mutsumi Sasaki and illustrated by Shinnosuke Mori, which was serialized in Dengeki G's Magazine from April 1999 to September 2002, featuring a high school student who is adopted by five of his teachers. It was adapted into a five-part OVA series in 2001; a thirteen-episode animated television series in 2002; a sequel television series, called Happy Lesson Advance, in 2003; and a second OVA series, Happy Lesson: The Final, in 2004. The series has also been adapted into a series of drama CDs and a Dreamcast game.

The first volume of the manga was licensed and released by A.D. Vision's ADV Manga label in the United States; the first three episodes of the OVA and the first TV series were licensed by the ADV Films label for Region 1 distribution.

== Plot ==
The plot of Happy Lesson is based on five teachers who end up living with a troubled and indifferent orphan and their unusual plan to become mother figures in an effort to make him a productive student. To achieve their plan, they employ various methods, such as science experiments, spiritual cleansing, physical training, and hijinks.

== Characters ==
Aside from the male lead, the main female characters follow a distinct scheme in their names. Their surnames are listed off in numbers, from 1 to 10. Furthermore, those characters have the archaic names of the months as their given names; for example, Mutsuki means "January", Kisaragi means "February", and so on.

=== Main characters ===
Chitose Hitotose (仁歳 チトセ, Hitotose Chitose)
Voiced by: Daisuke Kishio (Japanese), Josh Meyer (English)
A high school orphan who has moved into his deceased parents' house by himself, but not for long as each of his teachers recognizes his slipping grades and decide to secretly move in with him, becoming his "Mothers".
In the beginning of the series, it is shown that Hitotose is very good at fighting, as seen when he beats up two guys who were making fun of him because he has no parents; later on, in Happy Lesson Advance, we see his ability to fight numerous times during his conflicts with Nagatsuki Kuron. Hitotose's true feelings about the family are also revealed in Happy Lesson Advance. He realized that he was in love with Mutsuki at the final season and they kissed in the final episode. In the anime version he replaces the original male protagonist, Susumu Arisaka.
Susumu Arisaka (有坂 ススム, Arisaka Susumu)
The male protagonist in the manga version of the story. He was actually the original male protagonist in the story but his circumstances with Chitose are the exactly the same, but unlike the anime version, he actually converted his private home into a boarding house to earn a living, where much to his chagrin it was his teachers who became his tenants, whom later on become his "Mama's" . He differs in personality from Chitose, being more studious, less irritable and generally nicer to those around him.

=== Teachers ===
Mutsuki Ichimonji (一文字 むつき, Ichimonji Mutsuki)
Voiced by: Ruri Asano (Japanese), Shaneye Ferrell (English)
Chitose's homeroom teacher and a teacher of Japanese Classics, she is the first to move in with him. She is gentle until Chitose slacks off on studying. She is seen cooking or cleaning the house. At the end of the series, she realizes she's actually in love with Chitose, and the two become a couple.
Kisaragi Ninomai (二ノ舞 きさらぎ, Ninomai Kisaragi)
Voiced by: Akiko Kimura (Japanese), Peyton Hayslip (English)
The introverted science teacher who acts like a cultist. She is far interested in science and things that can be explained through science. Though she usually comes across as 'emotionless', Kisaragi is an incredibly warm, loving, sweet and kind-hearted person who is fond of cute things (such as baby animals, pink pajamas and her son), and cares deeply for the people around her. She is actually an alien, which explains her high technological skills.
She once performs a magic show, with Chitose as the assistant, and when asked, she states it will be a "Black magic show."
Yayoi Sanzenin (三世院 やよい, Sanzen'in Yayoi)
Voiced by: Kikuko Inoue (Japanese), Lana Lesley (English)
The school nurse and miko (meaning priestess), Yayoi can be calm and spiritual unless she feels Chitose is in danger, when she may put her sword fighting skills to work. She is seen wearing a Japanese priest dress and puts her sword against Chitose's neck in order to attain a positive response. She is also very popular at school, with many of the male students faking injury or sickness so she could "treat" them.
Uzuki Shitenno (四天王 うづき, Shitenno Uzuki)
Voiced by: Kimiko Koyama (Japanese), Larissa Wolcott (English)
The creative arts teacher, Uzuki acts like a small girl and is very happy-go-lucky. She gets into many arguments with Satsuki and is often seen wearing angel-like wings due to her obsession with cosplay.
Satsuki Gokajo (五箇条 さつき, Gokajō Satsuki)
Voiced by: Kahoru Sasajima (Japanese), Lee Eddy (English)
The athletics coach, Satsuki prefers brawn over brains and has a loud personality. A tomboy, she is seen as very aggressive and violent, acting or speaking without thinking things through, but with a very sweet personality underneath. She is often referred to as "The Bear-Woman" for she is prone to wear pajamas with bears on them and acts like an animal.

=== Heroines ===
Minazuki Rokumatsuri (六祭 みなづき, Rokumatsuri Minazuki)
Voiced by: Nana Mizuki (Japanese), Leigh Anderson Fisher (English)
Chitose's adopted younger sister. Mina currently attends the middle school section of the same campus as Chitose. She lives with her sister Hazuki (whenever she is not touring) in an apartment building not far from Chitose's house. Mina loves Chitose like a real brother, but also harbors a bit of a deep crush for him and helps Chitose whenever she can. She plans to marry Chitose when she is old enough.
Fumitsuki Nanakorobi (七転 ふみつき, Nanakorobi Fumitsuki)
Voiced by: Ryōka Shima (Japanese), Shawn Sides (English)
Chitose's class president. Fumitsuki has a deep crush for Chitose, though he is oblivious to it. She has excellent marks and continuously tries to win Chitose's heart. At times she is very aggressive, seen punching people with great force in a comical manner in order to silence students B and C or to get back at Chitose. She finally confessed her feelings to Chitose in the final season.
Hazuki Yazakura (八桜 はづき, Yazakura Hazuki)
Voiced by: Mie Sonozaki (Japanese), Allison Keith (English)
Chitose's adopted elder sister. Hazuki is a pop idol in Japan; because of this, she is usually touring different cities across Japan. Her singing is very popular and has won the hearts of people across the country. A major characteristic is her ability to eat, being able to eat extremely large amounts of food in very little time. This is known as 'Okadu' a fictional technique that begins at level ten and gets harder each level down from nine to one. Hazuki is a sub-instructor of this style who has achieved the top level and the title of Obakyu. (Ep. 4) Based on the costume that seems to come with this title, (seen in Chitose's flashback.) this may be a cameo reference to Obake no Q-Tarō.
Nagatsuki Kuron (九龍 ながつき, Kuron Nagatsuki)
Voiced by: Tamaki Nakanishi
A mysterious kid from China who claims to be the rightful child of Mutsuki. She first appears in Happy Lesson Advance. She is versed in Kung Fu, and contends with Chitose at every chance possible. Although she is first introduced wearing a red China dress, she prefers to dress like a boy. In the end of Happy Lesson Advance she admits that she likes Chitose.
Kanna Togakushi (十隠 カンナ, Togakushi Kanna)
Voiced by: Akiko Nakagawa (Japanese), Carla Witt (English)
Kisaragi's childhood friend. She is first introduced as a highly skilled technician bent on taking over the world, with her technical skills being only second to Kisaragi. After meeting Chitose, she immediately develops a crush towards him and has been seeking to 'capture' him using both casual talking and technological force.

=== Other characters ===
Student B and C
Student B Voiced by: Syuya Hashiba (Japanese), Resif Trebor (English)
Student C voiced by: Takuro Nakagumi (Japanese), Jeffery Sands(English)
Two male students at Chitose's school who pop up every now and then. As their name suggest they each have a letter on their forehead. They seem to exist only to make Fumitsuki miserable as they constantly follow her around with a video camera and make sarcastic comments, often breaking the fourth wall. They were the only members of her poetry club until she kicked them out. They regard Fumitsuki as the A member.

== Anime adaptations ==
=== Happy Lesson OVA ===
The manga was first adapted into an animated format in 2001, replacing the original male lead, Susumu Arisaka, with Chitose Hitotose. This first adaptation took the form of a five-part OVA, featuring how the main character meets with the teachers, as well as how he is reunited with his childhood friends, Hazuki Yazakura and Minazuki Rokumatsuri, from the orphanage. It was published from June 2001 to May 2003 by Studio KSS; English adaptations of the first three episodes were licensed and distributed in the United States by ADV Films.

==== List of episodes ====
No.	Title	Directed by	Written by	Release date
1	"Exciting - Mama Teachers"; Transliteration: "Doki Doki - Mama Tīchā" (Japanese: どきどき☆ママティーチャー)	Akira Koizumi	Takao Yoshioka	July 19, 2001
2	"Exciting - Vacation!"; Transliteration: "Waku Waku - Vakēshon" (Japanese: わくわく☆ヴァケーション)	Akira Koizumi	Takao Yoshioka	December 21, 2001
3	"Unsettling - Happy Mamas!"; Transliteration: "Hara Hara - Happī Mama" (Japanese: はらはら☆ハッピーママ)	Hideki Tonokatsu	Takao Yoshioka	April 26, 2002
4	"Cheerful - Koyomi On Stage"; Transliteration: "Uki Uki - Koyomi On Sutēji" (Japanese: うきうき☆こよみオンステージ)	Ichika Doshida	Takao Yoshioka	March 28, 2003
5	"Sparkling - Shrine Maiden Teacher"; Transliteration: "Kira Kira - Miko Tīchā" (Japanese: きらきら☆巫女ティーチャー)	Koyomi Ōgiri	Takao Yoshioka	May 23, 2003

=== Happy Lesson ===
==== List of episodes ====
No.	Title	Directed by	Written by	Original release date
1	"Exciting - Teacher Moms"; Transliteration: "Doki Doki - Mama Tīchā" (Japanese: ドキドキ☆ママティーチャー)	Akira Koizumi	Takao Yoshioka	April 1, 2002
2	"Happy - Let's Study"; Transliteration: "Run Run - Obenkyō Shimasho!" (Japanese: ルンルン☆お勉強しましょ!)	Iku Suzuki	Takao Yoshioka	April 8, 2002
3	"Bye-Bye - Adieu Spirit of Misfortune"; Transliteration: "Bai Bai - Saraba Fukōshin" (Japanese: バイバイ☆さらば不幸神)	Noriyuki Nakamura	Takao Yoshioka	April 15, 2002
4	"Unsteady - Which Place is Big Brother's?"; Transliteration: "Fura Fura - Onii-chan wa Dotchi?" (Japanese: フラフラ☆お兄ちゃんはどっち?)	Nobuaki Nakanishi	Takao Yoshioka	April 22, 2002
5	"Freezing - One Night In A Blizzard"; Transliteration: "Gan Gan - Fubuki no Ichiya" (Japanese: ガンガン☆吹雪の一夜)	Yoriyasu Kogawa	Kiyoko Yoshimura	April 29, 2002
6	"Restless - Conquer The World"; Transliteration: "Moji Moji - Sekai Seifuku!?" (Japanese: モジモジ☆世界征服?!)	Takeyuki Satohara	Takao Yoshioka	May 6, 2002
7	"Exciting - Mina Does Her Best!"; Transliteration: "Moe Moe - Mina-chan Ganbaru!" (Japanese: モエモエ☆みなちゃん頑張る!)	Noriyuki Nakamura	Kiyoko Yoshimura	May 13, 2002
8	"Floating - Uzuki is an Angel?"; Transliteration: "Fuwa Fuwa - Uzuki wa Tenshi?" (Japanese: フワフワ☆うづきは天使?)	Masami Furukawa	Takao Yoshioka	May 20, 2002
9	"Exhausting - Club Activities!"; Transliteration: "Kuta Kuta - Kurabu Katsudō" (Japanese: クタクタ☆クラブ活動)	Daisuke Takashima	Takao Yoshioka	May 27, 2002
10	"Dithering - Hazuki Announces Her Retirement?"; Transliteration: "Oro Oro - Hazuki Intai Sengen?" (Japanese: オロオロ☆はづき引退宣言?)	Takeyuki Satohara	Kiyoko Yoshimura	June 3, 2002
11	"Dizzying - The Big Transformation of Her Dreams"; Transliteration: "Kura Kura - Yume no Dai Henshin!" (Japanese: クラクラ☆夢の大変身!)	Noriyuki Nakamura	Kiyoko Yoshimura	June 10, 2002
SP	"Nice and Warm - Alone With Kanna"; Transliteration: "Hoka Hoka - Kanna to Futari Kiri" (Japanese: ホカホカ☆カンナと二人きり)	Daisuke Takashima	Takao Yoshioka	N/A
Bonus episode on the third DVD, originally from Happy Lesson Advance.
12	"Love-Love - Koyomi School Festival"; Transliteration: "Rabu Rabu - Koyomi Bunkasai" (Japanese: ラブラブ☆こよみ文化祭)	Yoriyasu Kogawa	Takao Yoshioka	June 17, 2002
13	"Teary - Did I See A Secret"; Transliteration: "Uru Uru - Himitsu Michatta!?" (Japanese: ウルウル☆秘密見ちゃった!?)	Daisuke Takashima	Takao Yoshioka	June 24, 2002

=== Happy Lesson Advance ===
==== List of episodes ====
No.	Title	Directed by	Written by	Original release date
1	"Sparkly - Uniform Show"; Transliteration: "Pika Pika - Seifuku Matsuri" (Japanese: ピカピカ★制服まつり)	Yoshinari Suzuki	Takao Yoshioka	July 1, 2002
2	"Clearly - Nagatsuki's Secret"; Transliteration: "Bare Bare - Nagatsuki no Himitsu" (Japanese: バレバレ★ながつきの秘密)	Yūsuke Kamata	Takao Yoshioka	July 8, 2002
3	"Impatient - Uzuki is a Mom"; Transliteration: "Uzu Uzu - Uzuki wa Mama" (Japanese: ウズウズ★うづきはママ)	Daisuke Takashima	Takao Yoshioka	July 15, 2002
4	"Well Well - A Day of Nurse's Office"; Transliteration: "Yare Yare - Hokenshitsu no 1 Hi" (Japanese: ヤレヤレ★保健室の1日)	Kaito Asakura	Takao Yoshioka	July 22, 2002
5	"Rustle Rustle - School Trip"; Transliteration: "Sowa Sowa - Shōgakuryokō" (Japanese: ソワソワ★修学旅行)	Yasuo Ejima	Takao Yoshioka	July 29, 2002
6	"Sharp Senses - Mina-chan in Big Crisis"; Transliteration: "Pin Pin - Mina-chan Dai Pinchi" (Japanese: ピンピン★みなちゃん大ピンチ)	Yūsuke Kamata	Takao Yoshioka	August 5, 2002
7	"Popular - Satsuki's Omiai"; Transliteration: "Mote Mote - Satsuki no Omiai" (Japanese: モテモテ★さつきのお見合い)	Monako Omae	Sachiko Doi	August 12, 2002
8	"Swaying - Memories at the Shore"; Transliteration: "Yura Yura - Hamabe no Omoide" (Japanese: ユラユラ★浜辺の思い出)	Ryō Yasumura; Yasuo Ejima	Takao Yoshioka	August 19, 2002
9	"Warm and Fuzzy - Alone With Kanna"; Transliteration: "Hoka Hoka - Kanna to Futari Kiri" (Japanese: ホカホカ★カンナと二人きり)	Daisuke Takashima	Takao Yoshioka	August 26, 2002
10	"Lies Lies - Goodbye, Kii-Chan"; Transliteration: "Uso Uso - Sayonara Kii-chan" (Japanese: ウソウソ★さよならきーちゃん)	Yūsuke Kamata	Sachiko Doi	September 2, 2002
11	"Noisy - Hazuki's My Shop"; Transliteration: "Gaya Gaya - Hazuki no Mai Shoppu" (Japanese: ガヤガヤ★はづきのマイショップ)	Toshikatsu Tokoro	Sachiko Doi; Takao Yoshioka	September 9, 2002
12	"Why Why - Mutsuki Runs Away From Home"; Transliteration: "Naze Naze - Mutsuki no Iede" (Japanese: ナゼナゼ★むつきの家出)	Tōru Ishida	Takao Yoshioka	September 16, 2002
13	"Clamor - A Farewell Day"; Transliteration: "Wai Wai - Owakare no Hi" (Japanese: ワイワイ★お別れの日)	Yasuo Ejima	Takao Yoshioka	September 23, 2002
SP	"Crying - Kanna's Christmas Rebellion"; Transliteration: "Bau Bau - Kanna no X'masu Sōdō" (Japanese: バウバウ★カンナのX'マス騒動)	Yūsuke Kamata	Takao Yoshioka	N/A
Special episode, included with the fifth Region 2 DVD.

=== Happy Lesson: The Final ===
==== List of episodes ====
No.	Title	Directed by	Written by	Release date
1	"Hot - Test of Courage in the Cool Evening"; Transliteration: "Atsu Atsu - Nōryō Kimodameshi" (Japanese: あつあつ☆納涼キモだめし)	Toshihiro Ishikawa	Saburō Ōmiya	May 28, 2004
2	"Pure - Mutsuki's Big Love!?"; Transliteration: "Ubu Ubu - Mutsuki no Dai Ren'ai!?" (Japanese: うぶうぶ☆むつきの大恋愛!?)	Toshihiro Ishikawa	Saburō Ōmiya	August 27, 2004
3	"Well Well - Happy Finale!"; Transliteration: "Yare Yare - Happī Daidanen!" (Japanese: やれやれ☆ハッピー大団円!)	Masakatsu Iijima	Saburō Ōmiya	October 22, 2004

=== Theme songs ===
Happy Lesson OVA

- Opening theme: "C'" ("C Dash"), by Hikari Okamoto
- Ending theme: "Place", by Five Moms

Happy Lesson

- Opening theme: "Telescope" (テレスコープ, Teresukōpu), by Sleepin' Johnny Fish
- Ending theme: "Dreamtown, Tokyo Life" (夢の都TOKYO LIFE, Yume no Miyako Tokyo Life), by Akiko Nakagawa

Happy Lesson Advance

- Opening theme: "Radio Jack" (RADIOジャック, Radio Jakku), by Sleepin' Johnny Fish
- Ending themes:
  1. "Party" (パーティー, Pātī), by Millio (episodes 1–12)
  2. "Love Goes On", by Mie Sonozaki (episode 13)

Happy Lesson: The Final

- Opening theme: "Hikari Hitotsu Hirari" (ひかりひとつひらり), by Sleepin' Johnny Fish
- Ending theme: "Paradise", by Grace

== Reception ==
Happy Lesson received positive reviews from English speaking audiences. Stig Hogset from Them Anime Reviews said that "the show itself actually manages to balance its comedy with the drama, neither one really overlapping or distracting the audience from the main content". Don Houston from DVD Talk review stated that it "was a fun, cute, and even interesting way to spend several hours as Chitose and his gang of lovely teachers handled the various situations they got into with a sly grin and a knowing wink". Chris Beveridge from AnimeonDVD commented that "I found myself laughing more at this than I expected (in a good way) and enjoyed it a lot over the couple of days it took us to get through all of it."

On another note, Happy Lesson - The Final wasn't received as well. "It ruins the family aspect that held this group together." said film and television critic Peter Bradshaw. "Mitsuki was Chitose's 'Number One Mom'--the one he viewed as being most like his own mother in his eyes. These two characters getting together at the end of the series throws both characters into a new, not favorable light." said a critic on Rotten Tomatoes. It was added "The fact that all the other mothers begin vying for this same attention just makes it worse." said Autumn Bartsch of Everyone's a Critic.
