= Saeko Chiba =

Japanese voice actress (born 1977)

- 千葉 紗子
- Born: August 26, 1977 (age 49); Hachinohe, Aomori, Japan
- Other name: Saepon
- Occupation: Voice actress
- Years active: 1990–present
- Agent: Space Craft Produce
- Children: 1

Saeko Chiba (千葉 紗子, Chiba Saeko; born August 26, 1977) is a Japanese voice actress and singer. She grew up in Tokyo and married in 2007. She is contracted to the Space Craft Produce.

== Biography ==
Chiba took up ballet at a young age with ambitions of becoming part of Takarazuka Revue. However, having failed the entrance exam for Takarazuka Music School in her third year of middle-school, she joined the Minami Aoyama Shōjo Kageki Dan (南青山少女歌劇団, South Aoyama Female Opera Group; also called Nanshō for short) a stage group for teenage girls.

Having had several lead roles over the three years she spent with the troupe, Chiba was then cast in the lead voice acting role of Kotori Haruno in the Dreamcast game Kita e. Having had a taste of being a voice actress and deciding that she preferred voice acting to performing on stage, Chiba decided to pursue the career full-time. Some of her earlier roles are her voice acting debut as Tsubaki Sakura in Kare Kano, Kitsune no Akane in Angel Tales, and Elliot Chapman in Sci-Fi Harry. Chiba was famed for her long, straight, black hair and seemingly cold outward appearance which led to her being cast in various tsundere and 'cool-girl' roles. She then cut her hair short in the spring of 2005, which strangely coincided with the increasing diversity of her roles, as Chiba herself noted on the My-HiME fandisc interview. Chiba has pursued a singing career with Yuki Kajiura, who wrote music for some of the Nanshō stage shows, writing and producing almost all her material. Her first single was Koi no Kiseki, the theme song for the PlayStation game Meguri Aishite. She has since released nine singles and two albums, along with various character song and drama CDs. She has also performed theme songs for games such as Alundra 2 and Atelier Judie. Chiba was also part of the group tiaraway with fellow Nanshō member Yuuka Nanri. Originally recording and performing as 'Saeko Chiba & Yuuka Nanri' for Memories Off 2nd, the duo released three singles and an album before breaking up on March 6, 2005.

On February 17, 2011, Chiba gave birth to her first child, a daughter.

== Filmography ==
=== Anime ===
1998

- Kare Kano (Tsubaki Sakura)

2000

- Boogiepop Phantom (Yoko Sasaoka)
- Tottoko Hamtarō Dechu (Lapis-chan)
- Sci-Fi Harry (Elliot Chapman)

2001

- Angel Tales (Kitsune no Akane)
- Ask Dr. Rin! (Meirin Kanzaki)

2002

- UFO Ultramaiden Valkyrie (Akina Nanamura)
- Heat Guy J (Kyoko Milchan)
- Duel Masters (Sayuki Manaka)

2003

- The World of Narue (Hajime Yagi)
- Nanaka 6/17 (Chie Kazamatsuri)
- Tenshi no Shippo Chu! (Fox Akane)
- Ultra Maniac (Maya Orihara)
- Avenger (Maple)
- UFO Ultramaiden Valkyrie 2: December Nocturne (Akina Nanamura)
- Chrono Crusade (Azmaria Hendric)

2004

- Gravion Zwei (Fei Shinruu)
- Aishiteruze Baby (Ayumi Kubota)
- Madlax (Chiara)
- Duel Masters Charge (Shayuki Manaka)
- Rockman EXE Stream (Jasmine)
- My-HiME (Natsuki Kuga)
- W Wish (Tsubasa Ohtori)
- Kujibiki Unbalance (Ritsuko Kyuberu Kettenkraftrad)

2005

- GUNxSWORD (Priscilla)
- Peach Girl (Momo Adachi)
- Bludgeoning Angel Dokuro-Chan (Dokuro Mitsukai)
- Buzzer Beater (Claire)
- MÄR (Aidou)
- Best Student Council (Miura)
- Tsubasa: RESERVoir CHRoNiCLE (Oruha)
- Strawberry Marshmallow (Chika Itoh)
- UFO Ultramaiden Valkyrie 3: Bride of Celestial Souls' Day (Akina Nanamura)
- Noein (Ai Hasebe)
- Rockman EXE Beast (Jasmine)
- Gunparade Orchestra (Noeru Sugawara)
- My-Otome (Natsuki Kruger)

2006

- Hell Girl (Yuuko Murai)
- Ayakashi (Oshizu)
- Bakegyamon (Kagari)
- Ray (Anna Takekawa)
- NANA (Miu Shinoda)
- Gin-iro no Olynssis (Marika)
- Code Geass: Lelouch of the Rebellion (Nina Einstein)
- Venus to Mamoru (Mitsuki Fujita)

2007

- D.Gray-man (Liza)
- Ghost Slayers Ayashi (Kiyohana)
- Nodame Cantabile (Reina Ishikawa)
- Bludgeoning Angel Dokuro-Chan 2 (Dokuro Mitsukai)
- GIANT ROBO (Maria Vovnich)
- Reideen (Akira Midorino)
- Nagasarete Airantou (Ayane)
- Bokurano (Chizu's older sister)
- Spider Riders: Yomigaeru Taiyou (Corona)
- Buzzer Beater 2 (Claire)
- Majin Tantei Nōgami Neuro (Shouko Hayami)
- Dragonaut: The Resonance (Widow)
- Goshūshō-sama Ninomiya-kun (Shinobu Kirishima)
- Shugo Chara! (Nadeshiko Fujisaki)
- Minami-ke (Hayami)

2008

- Rosario + Vampire (Rubi Tōjō)
- Shigofumi (Natsuka Kasai)
- Minami-ke: Okawari (Hayami-senpai, Hiroko)
- XxxHOLiC: Kei (Neko Musume)
- Psychic Squad (Bullet (Young), Chil Chil's Rival, Mary Ford, Momiji Kanou)
- Code Geass: Lelouch of the Rebellion R2 (Nagisa Chiba, Nina Einstein)
- Glass Maiden (Sofia)
- Scarecrowman (Elsa)
- Strike Witches (Mio Sakamoto)
- Birdy the Mighty: Decode (Birdy Cephon Altera)
- Mission-E (Yuma Saito)
- Blade of the Immortal (Ren)
- Rosario + Vampire Capu2 (Rubi Toujou)
- Shugo Chara!! Doki— (Nagihiko Fujisaki)
- Kemeko Deluxe! (Aoi-chan)

2009

- Shikabane Hime: Kuro (Rika Aragami)
- Minami-ke: Okaeri (Hayami-senpai, Hiroko)
- Birdy the Mighty Decode:02 (Birdy)
- Spice and Wolf II (Amartie)
- Jungle Emperor Leo (Professor Hikawa)
- Shugo Chara! Party! (Nagihiko Fujisaki)
- Kaidan Restaurant (Aya)

2010

- The Legend of the Legendary Heroes (Sion's Mother)

2011

- Wandering Son (Chizuru Sarashina)

2013

- Minami-ke Tadaima (Hayami)

=== OVA ===
- .hack//Liminality (Yuki Aihara)
- Bludgeoning Angel Dokuro-Chan (Dokuro Mitsukai)
- Cosplay Complex (Maria Imai)
- Karas (Yoshiko Sagizaka)
- Iriya no Sora, UFO no Natsu (Akiho Sudou)
- Kikoushi-Enma (Yukihime)
- King of Bandit Jing in Seventh Heaven (Benedictine)
- Kujibiki Unbalance (Ritsuko Kübel Kettenkrad)
- Sci-Fi Harry (Elliott Chapman)
- Tristia of the Deep-Blue Sea (Panavia Tornado)
- My-Otome Zwei (Natsuki Kruger)
- Tetsuwan Birdy: Decode OVA "The Chiper" (Birdy Cephon Altera)
- Code Geass: Nunally In Wonderland (Nina Einstein)

=== Games ===
- Alundra 2: A New Legend Begins (Aishia)
- Case Closed: The Mirapolis Investigation (Linda Hanayama)
- Chocolat~maid café curio (Kanako Akishima)
- Dengeki Bunko: Fighting Climax (Dokuro-Chan)
- Dengeki Gakuen RPG: Cross of Venus (Dokuro-Chan)
- Grandia III (Unama)
- Kita he~White Illumination (Kotori Haruno)
- Kita he~Photo Memories (Kotori Haruno)
- Memories Off 2nd (Takano Suzuna)
- My-HiME ~Unmei no Keitōju~ (Natsuki Kuga)
- Tales of Hearts (Beryl Benito)
- Tales of Vesperia (Nan)

=== Dubbing ===
- Sound of Colors (Dong Ling (Dong Jie))

== Discography ==
=== Singles ===
#	Title	Release date	Oricon peak
1	Koi no Kiseki (恋の奇跡)	1999.02.27	_
2	Carry On Everyday	1999.11.20	_
3	Twinkle Star (トゥインクル☆スター)	2001.04.25	_
4	Daiya no Genseki (ダイヤの原石)	2002.08.24	_
5	Sayonara (さよなら)	2002.11.10	_
6	Hikari (ひかり)	2003.01.22	No. 163
7	Ice Cream (アイスクリイム)	2003.05.21	No. 73
8	Winter Story	2003.11.27	No. 106
9	Sayonara Solitia (さよならソリティア)	2004.01.21	No. 53

=== Character singles ===
#	Title	Release date	Anime information
1	Kirei na Namida~Kirei na Namida Yasashii Kimochi~ (きれいな涙~きれいなナミダ やさしいキモチ~)	2003.12.03	Image single of Akina Nanamura from UFO Princess Valkyrie
2	Mizube no Hana (水辺の花)	2004.09.15	Image single of Natsuki Kuga from My-HiME
3	Ichigo Mashimaro Character Image CD Volume 1: Chika (苺ましまろ キャラクターイメージCD(1)「千佳」)	2005.03.09	Image single of Chika Ito from Strawberry Marshmallow
4	Rosario + Vampire Character Single 5: Ruby Toujou (ロザリオとバンパイア キャラクターソングシリーズ(5) 橙条瑠妃)	2008.03.26	Image single of Ruby Tojou from Rosario + Vampire
5	Rosario + Vampire Capu2 Character Single 6: Ruby Toujou (ロザリオとバンパイアCapu2 キャラクターソング(6) 橙条瑠妃)	2008.03.26	Image single of Ruby Tojou from Rosario + Vampire
6	Shugo Chara! Character Song Album Best 2: Hana Tegami (花手紙)	2009.08.05	Image single of Nadeshiko/Nagihiko Fujisaki from Shugo Chara!

=== Albums ===
#	Title	Release date	Oricon peak
1	melody	2003.03.26	No. 201
2	everything	2004.06.23	No. 126
