= Heat Guy J =

Japanese anime television series

- UK DVD box set

ヒートガイジェイ (Hīto Gai Jei)
- Genre: Crime, science fiction
- Created by: Kazuki Akane; Satelight
- Anime television series
- Directed by: Kazuki Akane
- Produced by: Tetsuo Genshou; Atsushi Sugita; Shinjirou Yokoyama; Tetsuya Tomioka
- Written by: Kazuki Akane
- Music by: Try Force
- Studio: Satelight
- Licensed by: AUS: Madman Entertainment; NA: Funimation; UK: Manga Entertainment
- Original network: TBS
- English network: US: MTV2
- Original run: 1 October 2002 – 25 March 2003
- Episodes: 25 + OVA
- Manga
- Written by: Chiaki Ogishima
- Published by: Kodansha
- English publisher: NA: Tokyopop
- Magazine: Magazine Z
- Published: 2003
- Volumes: 1
- icon

Heat Guy J (Japanese: ヒートガイジェイ, Hepburn: Hīto Gai Jei) is a Japanese anime television series created and directed by Escaflowne director Kazuki Akane and animated by Satelight.

Heat Guy J was licensed and distributed in the U.S. in 2003 by Pioneer (which subsequently became Geneon Entertainment). It was re-released by Funimation in the fall of 2009. The first 13 episodes of the show were also broadcast on the cable channel MTV2. A one volume manga was created based on the series, and was licensed and distributed by Tokyopop. The show was picked up for a UK DVD release by Manga Entertainment starting in March 2006. It was packaged in double DVD sets to make up for the long delayed release of the series.

== Plot ==
Heat Guy J chronicles the adventures of a young Special Services officer named Daisuke Aurora and his android partner known simply as "J". The pair live and work in the fictional, futuristic Metropolis of "Judoh" (Jewde), where the understaffed and underfunded Special Services Division of the Bureau of Urban Safety has its headquarters.

== Characters ==
=== Special Services ===
Special Services (特務課, Tokumu-ka), a division of the Bureau of Urban Safety (都市安全管理局中央司令部本部長, Toshi Anzen Kanri-kyoku Chūō Shirei-bu Hon Buchō), is tasked in investigating and preventing criminal activity from happening in Judoh. Their headquarters is designed after the Flatiron Building in Manhattan, New York.

- Daisuke Aurora (ダイスケ・アウローラ, Daisuke Aurōra; romanized as "Aurola" on his ID card seen in episode 10) - Department of Security, Central Headquarters Special Services Employee, age 21

Voiced by: Masaya Matsukaze (Japanese); Steve Staley (English)

Nicknamed "Dai-chan" (or "Dice"). Cool and laid back, Daisuke is one half of the Special Services Bureau's investigative team. He prefers action to paperwork, but when he's not out on the street fighting crime, he's often seen in various states of in-action. Although he never really shows it, Daisuke is quite compassionate and has a strong sense of justice. However, he has deep and painful memories of the vanishing of his mother and his father (a politician) being murdered by an android. The only memento of his father is a bullet pendant he wears around his neck.

- J (ジェイ, Jei) (also known as "Heat Guy J") - Special Services Android, 3, appearance of a 40-year-old man

Voiced by: Takayuki Sugō (Japanese); Bob Papenbrook (English)

An android with incredible power, J was created in cooperation between a government facility and a civilian enterprise; androids are illegal in Judoh, but a special exception is made for J, much to the dismay of wary city officials. Despite his hulking size, J can run at enormous speeds and packs a powerful punch. However, after prolonged bouts of action, J must cool himself down by venting a great deal of superheated air from pipes mounted on his shoulders, making a sound like a howling wolf. J is maintained by the Civilian Enterprises Sect technician Antonia Bellucci. It is said that J is modeled after Antonia's father. This is probably why J seems to be so human sometimes, with a noble character and strong beliefs on things like how a man should act.

- Kyoko Milchan (キョウコ・ミルシャン, Kyouko Mirushan) - Department of Security, Central Headquarters Special Services Auditor/Accountant, age 21

Voiced by: Saeko Chiba (Japanese); Kari Wahlgren (English)

A young auditor and accountant for Special Services, Kyoko is strait-laced and always plays by the rules. This causes her stress when dealing with Daisuke, whom she often scolds. However, she eventually develops feelings towards Daisuke, after letting go of her crush on his brother Shun.

- Shun Aurora (シュン・アウローラ, Shun Aurōra; romanized as "Aurola" by default considering Daisuke's ID card in episode 10) - Government Investigative Office of Department of Security, Central Headquarters General Manager, age 27

Voiced by: Shin-ichiro Miki (Japanese); Lex Lang (English)

Daisuke's older brother and the General Manager of the Bureau of Urban Safety, Shun prides himself on his rational and logical thinking. Shun's logical nature is usually in conflict with Daisuke's more impulsive personality. This causes a gap between the two brothers, despite the fact that Shun raised Daisuke after their father's death at the hand of an android. Another point of contention between them is Shun's inability to forgive his mother for leaving their family when Shun was 9 and Daisuke 3. Shun is responsible for the partnership of his brother with J.

- Phia Oliveira (フィア・オリヴィエラ, Fia Oriviera) - Central Headquarters, General Manager's Secretary, age 27

Voiced by: Michiko Neya (Japanese); Julie Ann Taylor (eps. 1–13), Karen Strassman (eps. 14–26) (English)

Phia is Shun's head secretary over at the Bureau of Urban Safety office. She is very reliable although she seems to take enjoyment in seeing Shun and Daisuke argue.

=== Friends ===
- Antonia Belucci (アントニア・ベルッチ, Antonia Berucchi) - Sect Employee, age 24

Voiced by: Sanae Kobayashi (Japanese); Wendee Lee (English)

An employee of the civilian enterprise "Sect," (the company responsible for creating J) she is responsible for J's maintenance. She still mourns the death of her father at an early age and was responsible for creating J in his image and personality. She worries and cares a lot for J. Daisuke also harbors a secret crush on Antonia.

- Ken Edmundo (ケン・エジムンド, Ken Ejimundo) - Galea Police Investigation Inspector, age 33

Voiced by: Keiji Fujiwara (Japanese); Kirk Thornton (English)

A crime scene investigator who is constantly annoyed with the Special Service Agency, he usually scolds and antagonizes Daisuke when he arrives on the scene. He does, however, help Daisuke on various occasions, and is a valuable ally in many of the Special Services cases.

- Monica Gabriel (モニカ・ガブリエル, Monika Gaburieru) - Photographer, age 10

Voiced by: Ai Shimizu (Japanese); Sandy Fox (English)

To earn money for herself, her mother and her donkey, Parsley, Monica works as a photographer who operates by wagon in the city of Judoh. She wants to preserve the long dead age of photography (which explains why she has so much trouble making a sale). However, she has accumulated a great deal of information on Judoh and its business trends. Her mother, Christina, is an unemployed degenerate drunk, and for the most part sponges off her daughter's meager earnings and sleeps off her hangovers inside the wagon during the day. Monica is a friend of Daisuke and gives him important advice and information whenever he needs it.

- Kia Freeborn (キア・フリーボーン, Kia Furībōn) - Guitarist, age 21

Voiced by: Yūji Ueda (Japanese); Steven Blum (English)

A blues guitarist who is saved from a group of thugs by Daisuke. Kia has a hatred for his father Blues Dullea for abandoning him and his mother. Upon hearing of his half-brother Ray Dullea performing a concert in Judoh, Kia trades his Gibson Les Paul for a pistol with the intent of killing Ray, but he later changes his mind and throws the gun in the river. Shortly after the concert, Ray recognizes Kia and embraces him, bringing closure to Kia's grudge on his father. In addition, Daisuke returns Kia's guitar after shutting down the underground firearms factory.

- Cynthia, Janis, and Vivian

Cynthia (シンシア, Shinshia) - age 20 Voiced by: Ryōko Nagata (Japanese); Michelle Ruff (English)
Janis (ジャニス, Janisu) - age 21 Voiced by: Akeno Watanabe (Japanese); Wendee Lee (English)
Vivian (ビビアン, Bibian) - age 19 Voiced by: Ai Tokunaga (Japanese); Dorothy Elias-Fahn (English)

Three girls who hang out and work on Kabuki Road. The three girls are a source for the latest Judoh news and gossip for Daisuke. They also often try to hit on him, but never succeed.

- Tom Yunk (トム・ヤンク, Tomu Yanku) - Cook, age unknown

Voiced by: Takeharu Onishi (Japanese); Dave Wittenberg (English)

A chef who runs an Asian street food stall on Kabuki Road. He often feeds Daisuke information alongside his lunch.

- Rumie (ルミエ) - Nurse, age unknown

Voiced by: Mayumi Iizuka (Japanese); Michelle Ruff (English)

A nurse who lives in the city's underground. When Daisuke loses his silver bullet pendant in a sewer drainage during a fight with a mercenary, Rumie buys it from an underground merchant, but gives it back to Daisuke after befriending him. Shortly after Daisuke and J rescue Rhine Junius from Clair, Rumie decides to travel with the Celestials.

- Rhine Junius (ライン・ジュニアス, Rain Juniasu) - Celestial, age unknown

Voiced by: Mitsuru Miyamoto (Japanese); George C. Cole (English)

A member of the Celestials, a group of god-like beings in charge of the surviving cities of Earth. The Celestials land on Judoh every 18 years to ensure the city's lifespan, but while they are ambushed by a group of mercenaries, Rhine wanders around the city before he is kidnapped by Claire. Daisuke and J rescue Rhine and prove his safety to the Celestials, allowing them to proceed with their ceremony in the city.

- Princess (姫, Hime) - Siberbian, age unknown

Voiced by: Maaya Sakamoto (Japanese); Kay Jensen (English)

A citizen of Siberbia (サバービア, Sabābia), a distant village devoid of technology. Princess travels to Judoh in search of her grandfather, who went there to exact vengeance on a group of thugs who murdered her parents. She befriends Daisuke, despite their cultural differences, as Siberbians never reveal their names to non-family members and they refuse help from anyone. Princess later finds her grandfather in the south side of the city, but he is shot by the thugs. Daisuke and J arrest the thugs while Princess convinces her grandfather to let go of the hatred he developed before he dies.

=== Enemies ===
- Clair Leonelli (クレア・レオネリ, Kurea Reoneri) - Current leader, or "Vampire", of the Company Vita Crime Syndicate, age 19

Voiced by: Daisuke Sakaguchi (Japanese); Johnny Yong Bosch (English)

Clair inherited his title of Vampire, head of the crime syndicate Company Vita (カンパニー・ビィータ, Kanpanī Bīta), after his father, Lorenzo Leonelli, died at the beginning of the series. He lives in his father's shadow and constantly flashes back to instances of both physical and emotional abuse. Being compared to his father is his biggest weakness as well as the easiest way to anger him. Due to his father's abuse, he is also unpredictable and emotionally unstable. He struggles to retain the loyalty of the other crime leaders in the city, who fear his dangerous personality. He causes much trouble for Daisuke and J though he is by no means the pair's only problem.

- Giobanni Gallo (ジョバンニ・ギャロ, Jobanni Gyaro) - Clair's bodyguard, age 27

Voiced by: Kenta Miyake (Japanese); Lex Lang (English)

Giobanni is Clair's constant companion and his most consistent guard. He was originally an orphan from the slum area until Lorenzo Leonelli adopted him to be Clair's older brother.

- Mauro (マウロ) - Advisor to the Leonelli family, age 63

Voiced by: Nobuaki Sekine (Japanese); Tony Pope (first voice), Steve Kramer (second voice) (English)
An important adviser who has worked for the Leonelli family for generations. His loyalty towards the family is unwavering, and he constantly worries about Clair.

- Mitchal Rubenstein (ミシェル・ルビンスタイン, Misheru Rubensutain) - Clair's bodyguard, age 25

Voiced by: Katsuyuki Konishi (Japanese); Ezra Weisz (English)

The second close bodyguard of Clair's, and tends to be a ladies man. He makes comments on Kyoko, and women in general. He is often seen handling a pair of casino dice as his good luck charm

- Ian Nulse (イアン・ナルセ, Ian Naruse) - Clair's bodyguard, age 21

Voiced by: Jun Fukuyama (Japanese); Dave Wittenberg (English)

The third close bodyguard of Clair's, and is in charge of the technical aspect of things. He is an expert programmer and a very good spy. He is quiet most of the time though he quotes percentages and probabilities.

- Noriega (ノリエガ) - age 41

Voiced by: Jūrōta Kosugi (Japanese); James Lyon (English)

A former politician who is a member of Company Vita.

- Serge Echigo (セルジュ・エチゴ, Seruju Echigo) - age unknown

Voiced by: Norio Wakamoto (Japanese); Doug Stone (English)

A mysterious man who is said to control the entire economy of Judoh. He was also responsible for the death of Daisuke and Shun's father. It is revealed later in the series that four years prior, Echigo was shot dead by Shun, who then secretly ran all of Judoh's major businesses under the guise of Echigo.

- Beastmaster (獣使い, Kemonotsukai)

Voiced by: Kōji Ishii

A scientist from Magnagalia Prison who was in charge of experimentation on convicts sentenced to more than 100 years to life, surgically altering them into "beast-human" hybrids with animal faces and subjecting them to mind control to make them obedient to their masters. He travels to Judoh to recapture Boma after failing to brainwash him. The Beastmaster lures Boma and Daisuke in an empty stadium and forces them to fight each other, but Daisuke makes Boma remember his past and regain his humanity before Daisuke and J arrest the Beastmaster.

=== Other ===
- Shogun (将軍) - Dry goods store owner, age 72

Voiced by: Hikaru Miyata (Japanese); Tom Wyner (English)

The former boss of a crime syndicate, Shogun has grown old and now lives a simple life as a dry goods store owner. However, he still keeps tabs on the Underground and often passes on his knowledge to Daisuke, whom he raised following the death of Daisuke and Shun's father.

- Boma (ボマ) - Mercenary, age unknown

Voiced by: Takahiro Sakurai (Japanese); Richard Cansino (English)

A mysterious and silent refugee who is searching for his missing sister Usagi (うさぎ; "Bunny"). After being sent to Magnagalia Prison for a crime he committed in the past, he was given the head of a wolf as his punishment, but he promptly escapes to Judoh, disguising his wolf-like features with a holographic device. Boma is a skilled swordsman, wielding a monomolecular blade, and makes a deadly enemy (and later, a powerful ally) for Daisuke and J. It is later revealed that in his past life as a thief, his best friend Brad betrayed him as part of a setup by a crime syndicate. Boma killed Brad, unaware that the latter was planning to help him escape to Judoh. Furthermore, Usagi was the name of Brad's late sister, and Boma used her name as a safe word to shield his mind from the Beastmaster's brainwashing techniques.

- Romeo Visconti (ロメオ・ビスコンティ, Romeo Bisukonti) - Galea Police Investigation Inspector, age unknown

Voiced by: Susumu Chiba (Japanese); Edward Villa (English)

A crime scene investigator who works under Edmundo. He secretly investigates a money laundering scheme and its connections with Noriega before he is killed in the slums in an accident that was set up by Noriega.

== Manga ==
Coinciding with the anime series in 2002, a manga version of Heat Guy J was released. It was eventually distributed in the U.S. by Tokyopop in 2005. It was written and drawn by Chiaki Ogishima. While the main characters and general setup were similar to the anime, the manga has its own unique storyline and supporting characters. There is only one volume in the series, and it includes several pages of bonus material related to the show.

== Theme songs ==
Opening

- "Face" by Try Force

Lyrics, music, and arrangement by Try Force

Ending

- "Kokoro no Sukima" (心の隙間; lit. 'Gap in the Heart') by Wyse (eps. 1–13)

Lyrics and music by Takuma
Arrangement by Wyse

- "Hikari" (ひかり; lit. 'Light') by Saeko Chiba (eps. 14–25)

Lyrics, music, and arrangement by Yuki Kajiura
