= Memories Off 2nd =

Japanese visual novel

- Cover art for the PlayStation version.

メモリーズオフ セカンド (Memorīzu Ofu Sekando)
- Genre: Drama, Romance
- Video game
- Developer: KID
- Genre: Visual novel
- Platform: DC, PC, PS, PSP, iPhone, iPod Touch
- Released: September 27, 2001 (DC, PS); May 29, 2008 (PSP); February 23, 2010 (iPhone, iPod Touch)
- Original video animation
- Directed by: Takahiro Okao
- Produced by: Chiyomaru Shikura; Toshirou Sakuma
- Written by: Masashi Takimoto
- Music by: Takeshi Abo; Ryou Sakai
- Studio: Picture Magic; Rikuentai
- Released: January 22, 2003 – May 21, 2003
- Runtime: 31–32 minutes
- Episodes: 3

Memories Off 2nd (メモリーズオフ セカンド, Memorīzu Ofu Sekando) is a Japanese romance visual novel released by KID for the Dreamcast and PlayStation consoles on September 27, 2001. It is the second game in the Memories Off series. The game was released for the PlayStation Portable on May 29, 2008.

Memories Off 2nd was released on PlayStation 4 and Nintendo Switch in Japan as part of Memories Off Historia Vol. 1 compilation in 2021, and as a standalone title on Steam globally in 2024 with language support for Japanese, Traditional Chinese and Simplified Chinese.

== Characters ==
Ken Inami (伊波 健, Inami Ken)
Voiced by: Yukimasa Obi (OVA)

The protagonist of Memories Off 2nd.

Hotaru Shirakawa (白河 ほたる, Shirakawa Hotaru)
Voiced by: Nana Mizuki

The primary heroine of Memories Off 2nd, Hotaru is in her third year at Hamasaki High School. She often acts childish and immature, and is sometimes an airhead. Her favourite hobby is the piano. She confessed her love to Ken at Christmas, and in the OVA they're in a relationship, but she worries about Ken's feelings towards her. She appears in both of the Memories Off 3.5 OVA stories, and is a secondary character in Memories Off ~Sorekara~ who helps with Inori's feelings towards Isshu.

Tsubame Minami (南 つばめ, Minami Tsubame)
Voiced by: Haruna Ikezawa

Ken's teacher at Hamasaki High School and his next door neighbour. Tsubame is a mysterious woman who often speaks in philosophical terms and has a coldhearted personality with a decadent atmosphere about her. She is the instructor of the Summer School at Hamasaki High.

Tomoe Tobise (飛世 巴, Tobise Tomoe)
Voiced by: Tamaki Nakanishi

Hotaru's best friend, Tomoe is also in her third year at Hamasaki High School. She works part-time at a local restaurant and is a member of the theatre club. She has an open-hearted and cheerful personality. In the OVA, Ken overhears her reciting lines from her upcoming play, but mistakes them as a confession of love at first. She fears she may steal Ken from Hotaru. Her hairstyle slightly resembles Yue Imasaka's from the original Memories Off game.

Takano Suzuna (寿々奈 鷹乃, Suzuna Takano)
Voiced by: Saeko Chiba

A third year student at Hamasaki High School, Takano is a member of the swimming club and a classmate of Kens. She was born in Russia and has a kind and affectionate nature. She is especially popular to underclassmen.

Shizuru Shirakawa (白河 静流, Shirakawa Shizuru)
Voiced by: Shiho Kikuchi

The older sister of Hotaru, Shizuru is in her third year of university. She is especially good at making desserts which Hotaru loves to eat. She has an interest in and is good at professional wrestling. She also has a habit of spoiling and caring about Hotaru, helping her out with her troubles with Ken. She is a kind-hearted person in nature. She also appears in the Memories Off 3.5 OVA stories with Hotaru, and is a secondary character in Memories Off ~Sorekara~, working as the deputy manager at the same restaurant as Isshu.

Megumi Souma (相摩 希, Souma Megumi)
Voiced by: Yuuka Nanri

A second year student at Hamasaki High School, Megumi is a member of the art club and works part-time with Ken and Shin at the Ressac restaurant. She tries to keep herself busy there but her clumsy nature makes it difficult as she accidentally breaks plates on a common basis. Despite this, she tries to keep cheerful even though she's a manic-depressive.

Shouta Nakamori (中森 翔太, Nakamori Shōta)
Voiced by: Jun Fukuyama

Best friend of Ken, he is in his third year at Hamasaki High School and is the captain of the soccer club.

Shin Inaho (稲穂 信, Inaho Shin)
Voiced by: Junji Majima
He works at the same place as Ken, refers to Ken as Inaken and Hotaru as Tarutaru.

== Media ==
=== Anime ===
Memories Off 2nd has been adapted into an anime OVA series split into three episodes. The first of three DVDs went on sale on January 22, 2003. Later, a special Memories Off 2nd Special Edition ~Nocturne~ DVD was released on March 24, 2004. This DVD release is sixty minutes long and follows the same storyline as the original OVA but with a stronger focus and new footage of Hotaru Shirakawa.

== Music ==
The soundtrack of Memories Off 2nd is composed by Takeshi Abo while the theme songs are composed by Chiyomaru Shikura. The visual novel's opening theme, "Ashita Tenki ni..." (明日天気に...), was performed by Remi and its ending theme, Orugōru to Piano to (オルゴールとピアノと), is performed by Nana Mizuki. The anime adaptation's opening theme, "Nocturne", is also performed by Nana Mizuki and its ending theme, "Usual place", is performed by tiaraway. The opening for the PSP version is "Eternal Memories" by Ayane, which is also used as the opening for the PSP version of the original Memories Off.

== Reception ==
Reception

Review score
Publication	Score
Famitsu	8/10, 7/10, 6/10, 7/10 (PS)

Neal Chandran of RPGFan praised the Dreamcast version Memories Off 2nd for "...the risks [the game] took to create a more mature, dynamic, slightly darker narrative and peruse difficult themes that other, more play-it-safe examples of the genre probably wouldn't touch." but he "...did not find the new cast of characters very endearing..." when compared to the original Memories Off. Overall, he gave the game a rating of 82%.
