= Yūka Nanri =

- 南里 侑香
- Born: March 13, 1984 (age 42); Sasebo, Nagasaki, Japan
- Occupations: Actress; voice actress; singer
- Years active: 1997–present
- Agent: Space Craft Entertainment
- Height: 157 cm (5 ft 2 in)
- Musical career
- Genres: J-Pop
- Labels: Universal Music; Victor Entertainment
- Formerly of: Tiaraway, FictionJunction Yuuka
- Website: www.nanriyuuka.com

Yūka Nanri (南里 侑香, Nanri Yūka; born March 13, 1984) is a Japanese actress, voice actress and J-pop singer from Sasebo, Nagasaki. She is represented by Space Craft Entertainment.

== Biography ==
Yūka Nanri debuted on NHK's Utatte Odoronpa (うたってオドロンパ) (an educational programme) in 1995 as a child star.

In 1997, she joined Minami Aoyama Shōjo Kageki Dan (南青山少女歌劇団, South Aoyama Female Opera Group; also known as Nanshō), a stage group for young girls as one of its seventh generation members, and acted in musicals and other theatrical performances.

Nanri left the group in August 2001 and made her voice acting debut that year as Bubbles in the Japanese version of The Powerpuff Girls. After that, she officially started her voice acting activities as the protagonist of Gunslinger Girl. She has voiced many weak-looking and gentle characters, though in My-HiME she played Nao Yūki, a morally ambivalent middle school student who enjoys preying on perverted men.

In late 2003 Nanri formed tiaraway, a voice acting duo with fellow Japanese singer Saeko Chiba. After releasing three singles and an album tiaraway disbanded on March 6, 2005, after its first (and final) live concert. Nanri and Chiba cited wanting to go down separate paths as the reason for ending the group.

In 2006 Nanri was asked to voice Karen Ichijō from the second season of the anime School Rumble, but she turned it down to play the main character of the musical ANGEL GATE ~Haru no Yokan~ (ANGEL GATE～春の予感～, ANGEL GATE ~Spring's Premonition~), and participated in four performances from April 13–16. She graduated from university in March of the same year with an academic degree in vocal music.

Nanri is a currently a vocalist for Yuki Kajiura's "FictionJunction Yuuka" project. She held her first solo concert, entitled Premium Live 2007, as FictionJunction Yuuka in February 2007.

Nanri's first mini-album, "LIVE ON!", was released August 22, 2012.

== Filmography ==
=== Anime ===
- Memories Off 2nd (2001 OVA), Megumi Soma
- The Prince of Tennis (2001 TV series), Narumi Ijuuin (ep 134)
- Macross Zero (2002 OVA), Mao Nome
- Godannar (2003 TV series), Sakura
- Gunslinger Girl (2003 TV series), Henrietta
- My-HiME (2004 TV series), Nao Yūki, Female student (ep 22)
- W~Wish (2004 TV series), Akino Iida
- School Rumble (2004 TV series), Karen Ichijou
- The Place Promised in Our Early Days (2004 film), Sayuri Sawatari
- My-Otome (2005 TV series), Juliet Nao Zhang
- School Rumble: Extra Class (2005 OVA), Karen Ichijou
- My-Otome Zwei (2006 OVA), Juliet Nao Zhang
- Sora Kake Girl (2009 TV series), Nami Shishidō
- Wandering Son (2011 TV series), Saori Chiba
- Corpse Party: Missing Footage (2012 OVA), Mayu Suzumoto
- Sakamichi no Apollon (2012 TV series), Ritsuko Mukae
- Blood Lad (2013 TV series), Liz T. Blood
- Corpse Party: Tortured Souls (2013 OVA), Mayu Suzumoto
- Space Dandy (2014 TV series), Queen Bee Sofia
- Ushio and Tora (2015 TV series), Saya Takatori

=== Drama CDs ===
- 7 Seeds (2003), Natsu Iwashimizu
- Mai-HiME (2005), Nao Yūki
- Mai-Otome (2005), Juliet Nao Zhang

=== Games ===
- Memories Off 2nd (2001), Megumi Sōma, Nozomi Sōma
- W~Wish (2004), Akino Iida
- D→A:BLACK, Hīro Enomoto
- D→A:WHITE, Hīro Enomoto
- Memories Off After Rain Vol.2 (2005), Megumi Sōma
- My-HiME ~Unmei no Keitōju~ (2005), Nao Yūki
- Musashi: Samurai Legend (2005), Tamie
- Corpse Party BloodCovered: ...Repeated Fear (2010), Mayu Suzumoto
- Corpse Party: Book of Shadows (2011), Mayu Suzumoto
- Corpse Party 2U (2012), Mayu Suzumoto
- World's End Club (2020), Yuki
- Arknights (2024), Civilight Eterna

=== Musicals ===
- Goodbye Girl (グッバイガール, Gubbai Gāru), Lucy
- big
- FUNK-a-STEP
- FUNK-a-STEP2
- Waltz ga Kikoeru? (ワルツが聞こえる?, Warutsu ga Kikoeru?)
- Christmas Juliet ~Eve no Kiseki (クリスマスジュリエット～イヴの奇跡～, Kurisumasu Jurietto ~Ivu no Kiseki~)
- Highschool Revolution ~Ai to Yūki no Tabidachi~ (ハイスクール Revolution～愛と勇気の旅だち～, Haisukūru Revolution ~Ai to Yūki no Tabidachi~), Satsuki Katayama
- Christmas Juliet ~Eve no Kiseki [Another Showing] (クリスマスジュリエット～イヴの奇跡～ [再演], Kurisumasu Jurietto ~Ivu no Kiseki~ [Saien]), Akane Saitō
- Nagareboshi no Rarabai (流れ星のララバイ, Nagareboshi no Lullaby), Momoko
- ANGEL GATE ~Haru no Yokan~ (ANGEL GATE～春の予感～) (2006), Yuri

=== Dubbing ===
==== Live-action ====
- Bella Martha, Lina Klein (Maxime Foerste)

==== Animation ====
- The Powerpuff Girls (1998), Bubbles
- Frankenweenie (2012), Elsa Van Helsing

=== Songs ===
- Arashi no Hero (嵐の勇者(ヒーロー)) cover (2011), in album HARVEST

== Discography ==
- tiaraway releases
- FictionJunction releases
- FictionJunction YUUKA releases

=== Albums ===
- [2012.03.14] Rondo... Tsuki no Kioku wo Tadotte. (ロンド...月の記憶をたどって。)

=== Mini-albums ===
- [2012.08.22] LIVE ON!

=== Singles ===
- Fun! Fun! ★Fantasy

"Fun! Fun! ★Fantasy" was the 4th theme song for the anime Selfish Fairy Mirumo de Pon.

Track listing

1. "Fun! Fun! ★Fantasy" (Fun! Fun! ★ふぁんたじー, Fun! Fun! ★Fantajī)
2. "Nanairo Mirai" (ナナイロミライ)
3. "Fun! Fun! ★Fantasy (instrumental)"
4. "Nanairo Mirai (instrumental)"

Charts

Chart	Peak position	Sales	Time in chart
Oricon Weekly Singles	134	N/A	2 weeks

- Odyssey

"Odyssey" is Nanri's first official single and the opening for the anime Dengeki Gakuen RPG: Cross of Venus.
Catalog Number

UMCK – 5229

Track listing

1. "Odyssey" (オデッセイ)
2. "Dear"
3. "Odyssey (instrumental)"
4. "Dear (instrumental)"

Charts

Chart	Peak position	Sales	Time in chart
Oricon Weekly Singles	78	1,347	N/A

- Tsukishirube

"Tsukishirube" was the ending theme for the anime Ookami Kakushi.
Catalog Number

VTCL – 35084

Track listing

1. Tsukishirube (月導, Guidepost of the Moon)
2. "Ame no Sanpomichi" (雨の散歩道)
3. "Tsukishirube (instrumental)"
4. "Ame no Sanpomichi (instrumental)"

Charts

Chart	Peak position	Sales	Time in chart
Oricon Weekly Singles	36	4,908	N/A

- Shizuku

"Shizuku" was the ending theme song for .hack//Quantum.
Catalog Number

VTCL – 35097

Track listing

1. "Shizuku" (雫, Drop)
  - Vocalists: Yūka Nanri, Takumi Ozawa, Kaori Nishina
2. "Heart Bible" (Heartバイブル)
3. "Shizuku (instrumental)"
4. "Heart Bible (instrumental)"

Charts

Chart	Peak position	Sales	Time in chart
Oricon Weekly Singles	89	1, 404	N/A

- Kiseki

"Kiseki" was the ending theme for the anime Sacred Seven.
Catalog Number

VTCL – 35115

Track listing

1. "Kiseki" (輝跡, Sparkling Miracle)
2. "Anata to Watashi no Uta" (あなたと私のうた)
3. "Kiseki (instrumental)"
4. "Anata to Watashi no Uta (instrumental)"

Charts

Chart	Peak position	Sales	Time in chart
Oricon Weekly Singles	23	4,022	N/A

- BLOODY HOLIC

"BLOODY HOLIC" was the ending theme for the anime Blood Lad.
Catalog Number

VTCL-35156

Track listing

1. "BLOODY HOLIC"
2. "snow wind"
3. "BLOODY HOLIC" (without vocal)
4. "snow wind" (without vocal)
