= Tiaraway =

Japanese voice actress duo

- Tiaraway (2004) in a promotional photo for Omoide good night

Background information
- Also known as: Saeko Chiba & Yuuka Nanri
- Origin: Japan
- Genres: Pop
- Years active: 2003–2005
- Labels: King Records
- Members: Saeko Chiba; Yuuka Nanri; Band members Chiyomaru Shikura

Tiaraway (often stylized as tiaraway) was a Japanese voice actress duo consisting of Saeko Chiba and Yuuka Nanri.

== Biography ==
Tiaraway started out as a fix-termed voice actress duo in 2003, formed after the pair had recorded a song for the anime Memories Off 2nd. Their music, written and produced by Chiyomaru Shikura (志倉千代丸, Shikura Chiyomaru), featured in various anime and games.

The group released three singles and one album before holding their first (and final) live concert on 6 March 2005, the same day they announced that Tiaraway would be dissolved.

After the disbandment, the two members now concentrate on their own work: for Chiba voice-acting, and Nanri singing.

== Discography ==
=== Singles ===
#	Information
1	Your Shade/Usual Place: Released: December 21, 2003; Oricon peak: #109 (3 weeks); Track list: 1. Your Shade; 2. Usual Place; 3. Your Shade (off vocal); 4. Usual Place (off vocal)
2	Chōzetsu Tokkyū Go Tiara/Love Binetsu!? (超絶特急Go Tiara/Love 微熱!?): Released: July 22, 2004; Oricon peak: #165 (1 week); Track list: 1. Chōzetsu Tokkyū Go Tiara (超絶特急Go Tiara, Super Express Go Tiara); 2. Love Binetsu!? (Love 微熱!?, Love Slight Fever); 3. Chōzetsu Tokkyū GoTiara (off vocal); 4. Love Binetsu!? (off vocal)
3	Omoide Good Night/Can You Feel Crying Alone? (想い出 Good Night/Can You Feel Crying Alone?): Released: October 27, 2004; Oricon peak: #83 (2 weeks); Track list: 1. Omoide Good Night (想い出 Good Night, Reminiscence Good Night); 2. Can You Feel Crying Alone?; 3. Omoide Good Night (off vocal); 4. Can You Feel Crying Alone? (off vocal)

=== Albums ===
#	Information
1	Two:Leaf: Released: January 26, 2005; Oricon peak: #66 (2 weeks); First and only album, including all of their past singles plus new songs.; Track list: 1. Introduction; 2. Tabikounen Sora e (旅光年空へ); 3. From Silent Sky; 4. Your Shade; 5. Koi no Jellybeans (恋のジェリービーンズ, Jeallybeans of Love); 6. Metal Moon; 7. Chōzetsu Tokkyū Go Tiara (超絶特急Go Tiara, Super Express Go Tiara); 8. I Fall There: Yume no tsuzuki e (I Fall There: 夢の続きへ, I Fall There: To Another Dream); 9. Can You Feel Crying Alone?; 10. Shiroki Kagirohi (シロキカギロヒ); 11. Omoide Good Night (想い出 Good Night, Reminiscence Good Night); 12. Love Binetsu!? (Love 微熱!?, LOVE Slight Fever); 13. Aqua: Harukanaru Blue (Aqua: 遥かなるブルー, Aqua: Faraway Blue); 14. Two:Leaf; 15. Usual Place

== Appearances ==
=== Radio ===
- tiaraway Iroiro Very Night (tiaraway色々ベリーnight, tiaraway Iroiro berī night) (October 2003—September 2004)
- tiaraway's All Night Nippon.com (tiarawayの@llnightnippon.com, tiaraway no ōru night nippon.com) (January 2002)
