= Wyse (band) =

Japanese rock band

Wyse(wyse)
- Origin: Japan
- Genres: Pop rock, alternative rock
- Years active: 1999–2005, 2011-Present
- Label: Warner Music Group
- Members: Tsukimori; TAKUMA; MORI; HIRO
- Past members: KENJI; Natsu
- Website: Official site

Wyse (formerly stylized as "wyse") is a Japanese rock group that formed in 1999. In 2005 they broke up and gave out their last album entitled 19990214-20050213 only to come back together in 2011.

== Band members ==
Stage Name	Real Name	Birth Date	Part	Past Bands	Band Notes
Tsukimori	Tsukimori Kenichi	January 12, 1978	Vocalist	美夕, Loop	Still in band.
HIRO	Yamamura Yoshihiro	January 25, 1979	Guitarist	CROWDIA, Le view	Still in band.
MORI	Moriyama Masayuki	April 11, 1976	Guitarist	美夕, Loop; Before wyse got back together: MARK MUFFIN, Annie's Black	In both wyse and THE TERROR'S 666(As vocalist).
TAKUMA	Makita Takuma	November 17, 1980	Bassist, Second Vocalist, Leader	Ray, D≒SIRE, Le view Before wyse got back together: Solo works, Ravecraft	Still in band.
KENJI	Roa Kenji	December 7, 1977	Drummer, ex member	ELENA EMILIA, Celestia Rain, wyse, CODE, ALiBi	Currently vocalist of Visual Kei band 御主人様専用奇才楽団-Virgil-
Natsu	Tomotaka Kakimoto	Unknown	Drummer, ex member	Freesiaローディ, 夢幻, wyse, CRUNCH, LIQUID, RABBIT, DC	Currently unknown.
SAMMY	Unknown	Unknown	Support Drummer	RABBIT, Wyse	Retired.

== Discography ==
Singles

- 'It's not like me It's not like you' (1 July 2001)
- 'Rojiura no Ruru' (1 August 2001)
- 'thoughtful Day' (1 September 2001)
- 'Perfume' (13 March 2002)
- 'bring you my heart' (29 May 2002)
- 'Twinkle Stars' (28 August 2002)
- 'Air' (10 September 2003)
- 'Prism' (12 January 2004) - A free CD with 3 different package designs given at Wyse TOUR 2004 in Zepp Tokyo
- 'Distance' (14 July 2004)

Albums

- With... (1 September 2000) - A 5,000 limited prints
- DEAD LEAVES SHOWER (1 December 2000) - A 10,000 limited prints
- PERFECT JUICE (1 March 2001) - A 10,000 limited prints
- the Answer in the Answers (WEA)(12 December 2001)
- Calm (WEA) (9 October 2002)
- Beat (14 May 2003)
- WxYxSxE (12 May 2003)
- Marine Disc (29 May 2004)
- Wine Disc (29 May 2004)
- Colors (3d) (January 24, 2005)
- 19990214-20050213 (WEA) (April 4, 2005)
- Imaging (July 8, 2012)
- TREE -Evolve- (July 13, 2013) - MORI Select Disc/wyse Retake Album
- Surely in the mind (September 1, 2013)
- TREE -Flame- (June 14, 2014) - HIRO Select Disc/wyse Retake Album

DVD

- The Roots of "Dauntless Rider" (21 March 2003)
- PRIVATE DISC #01 "Vision" (July 2, 2011)
- 20110702 - wyse live 2011 "chain" at LIQUID ROOM (September 1, 2011)
- PRIVATE DISC #03 "To shy"(September 23, 2011)
- wyse Tour 2012 "Imaging Brain" Documentary (May to June, 2012)

VHS Tape

- 199904 (1 January 2003)
- 200112 (1 January 2003)
- The Roots of "Dauntless Rider" (21 March 2003)

== Trivia ==
- Wyse is with the same recording company as Kyary Pamyu Pamyu, Warner Music Japan.
- In an interview when asked what members they would date if they were women replied with "MORI or HIRO." (Tsukimori), "None of them because I hate them all." (HIRO), "I would prefer myself because I'm a bit of a narcissist." (TAKUMA). MORI didn't reply but their ex drummer KENJI replied with "Tsukimori because I like him."
- When asked in the same interview what would they be if not for Wyse, Tsukimori replied with the silly answer "A dog."
- Wyse are best friends with the band Waive.
- Waive broke up the same year as Wyse and got back together also the same year as Wyse. Both bands also no longer have an official drummer.
