= Haseo =

Fictional character in the .hack franchise

- .hack character
- Haseo as seen in his initial form in .hack//G.U. Vol. 1: Rebirth
- First appearance: .hack//G.U. Vol. 1: Rebirth (2006)
- Created by: Hiroshi Matsuyama
- Designed by: Seiichiro Hosokawa
- Voiced by: Japanese; Takahiro Sakurai; English; Yuri Lowenthal (.hack//G.U.); Andrew Francis (.hack//Roots)

Haseo (Japanese: ハセヲ), real name Ryou Misaki (Japanese: 三崎亮, Hepburn: Misaki Ryō), is a fictional character in the .hack franchise first introduced as the main character in the video game trilogy .hack//G.U. in 2006 by CyberConnect2. He is also the lead character in the anime television series .hack//Roots by Bee Train. A player character from the fictional massively multiplayer online role-playing game The World, he is feared in the .hack//G.U. narrative as the player killer of all player killers. This earned Haseo the nickname "The Terror of Death" (死の恐怖, Shi no Kyōfu). Searching for the killer Tri-Edge, who sent his friend Shino into a coma in real life, Haseo comes into contact with the guild G.U.. They seek to use his PC (player character) to destroy AIDA, a computer anomaly responsible for leaving players in a coma. Haseo's appearances in .hack//Roots depict his early days in The World as a member of the Twilight Brigade guild led by Ovan, where he first meets Shino. He has also appeared in other printed adaptations based on the .hack//G.U. games.

Haseo was created by CyberConnect2 CEO Hiroshi Matsuyama whose aim was for him to be a different protagonist from the previous .hack lead Kite. Since Kite was created to be the player's avatar in the original story, Haseo was meant to be more individual when it came to his characterization, by giving him darker traits. He was designed by Seiichiro Hosokawa, a new artist who joined CyberConnect2 in 2006. Takahiro Sakurai voices Haseo in Japanese. In the English version, he is voiced by Yuri Lowenthal in the games and Andrew Francis in the anime.

Video game publications have published both positive and negative reviews of Haseo's character, with most of the criticism being aimed at his rude personality. On the other hand, his development across the games and the improvement to his PC resulted in positive responses. Both Sakurai and Lowenthal were praised for their role in the games. Haseo's characterization was also the subject of mixed responses in other media.

== Creation ==
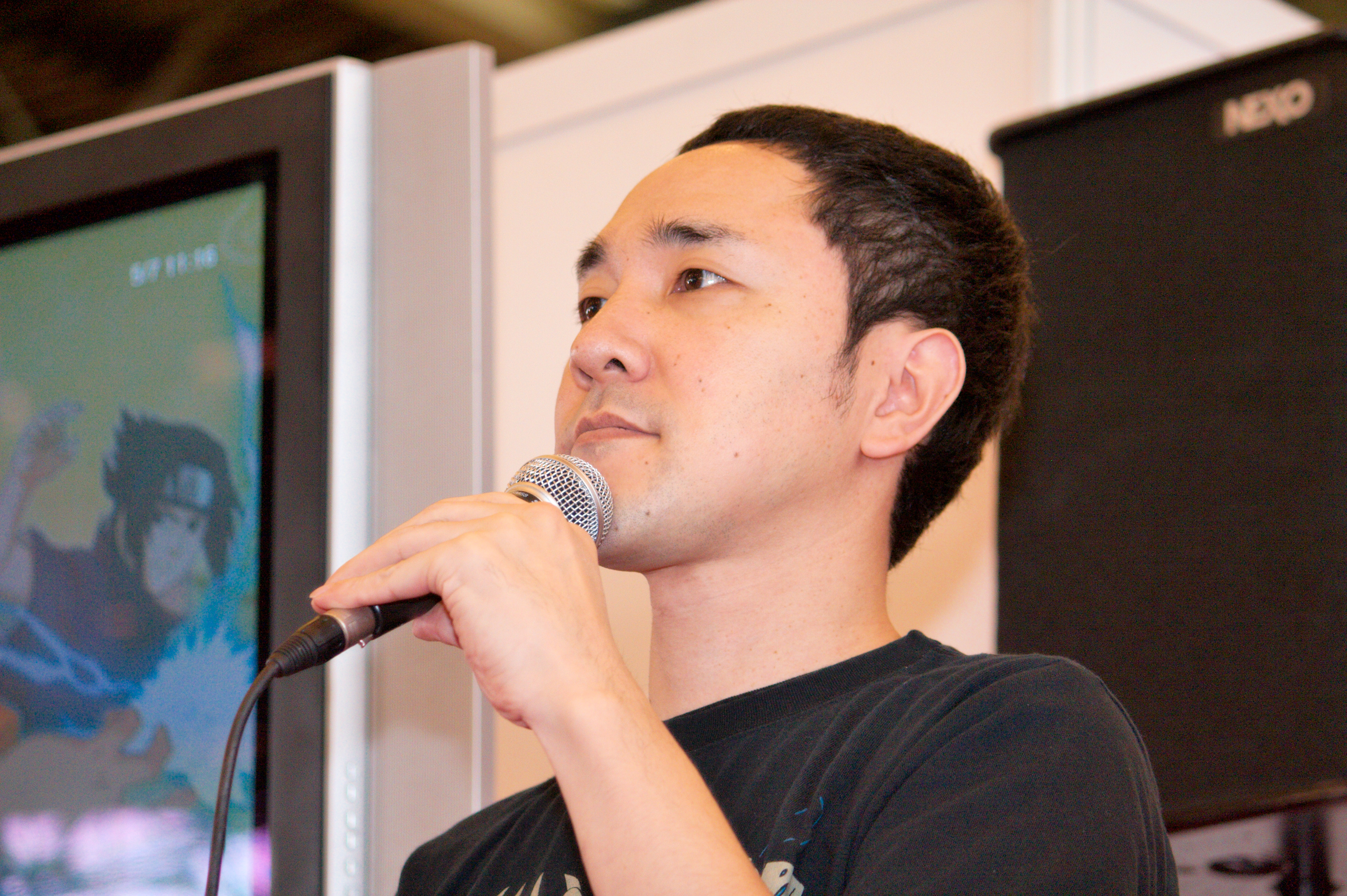
CyberConnect2 CEO Hiroshi Matsuyama created Haseo's character.

Haseo was devised to have a darker design than previous .hack characters to reflect the more mature storyline of the .hack//G.U. games. Hiroshi Matsuyama considered Kite a relatable character and wanted the next game to feature a different type of lead character for .hack//G.U.. In the three games, Haseo can have a deepened bond with a friend he has met with an ambiguous romantic tone based on who is chosen. Although Atoli was the main heroine, the team had issues with writing her to the point that Matsuyama himself chose other characters when he played the game alone. This spurred him to make her more appealing for the second chapter of .hack//G.U. since he saw himself as Haseo and had to pick the heroine as she was originally set up. Matsuyama also wanted the film to focus on Haseo and Atoli's relationship.

Since .hack and .hack//Sign were conceived as two ongoing and connected projects, Matsuyama wanted to do the same with .hack//GU. However, he wanted both .hack//G.U. and .hack//Roots to feature the same lead character, Haseo. However, he felt it would be challenging to write them both and have them stay true to the two original projects. For the remastered version of the trilogy, CyberConnect2 aimed to make newcomers "meet Haseo for the first time". Matsuyama wanted to use the remaster as an epilogue to Haseo's story and to promote it further, the team designed a new form for combat.

=== Characterization and themes ===
In contrast to the kind Kite from .hack, Haseo's antisocial personality was meant to reflect shonen manga leads who displayed iconic elements such as "rage, despair, conflict, courage, and victory". His characterization is meant to be more appealing based on how the player is distanced from him. While the third title ended Haseo's story, Matsuyama had mixed thoughts about it. Matsuyama aimed for Haseo to be written to give him multiple emotions to display during his quest for revenge against Tri-Edge for sending Shino into a coma. Haseo's character traits were decided at the outset, as was featuring him as both the game and the anime's protagonist to attract different audiences. Matsuyama decided the basics of Haseo's character before doing anything else. When conceiving the idea of the Haseo's Xth form, his bangs were drawn to symbolise his continued immaturity. Because of the story's massive scale and it being spread across multiple media, Matsuyama brought Hamasaki in to help with the writing because of his experience working on the previous .hack project. Hamasaki wrote the game's script.

Hamasaki claims Haseo's personality was toned down for the games to make him more appealing. In contrast, Haseo is more aggressive in the printed adaptations (written by Hamasaki) where he often threatens his enemies. Hamasaki said Haseo's traits are his attempts at writing a PC controlled by an antisocial teenager. As one of the themes of the series is "Grow Up", Haseo gradually matures across .hack//G.U. symbolized by the initials of the title. The second game was titled The Voice That Thinks of You with the director citing multiple relationships, including how Haseo remembers Shino's voice, how Atoli thinks of Haseo and most importantly, Ovan's relationship with Haseo. By the third game, Haseo finishes his character arc when he finds his opposite who is colored in white though both share the third form.

In contrast to the original games where Ovan becomes Haseo's ally, the Trilogy OVA (original video animation) was written with the opposite result. Haseo's character arc in the movie shows him obsessed with violence during his struggles with Ovan, and he reaches his Xth Form when coming to terms with the flaws of his ways. Matsuyama felt this take on Haseo was well executed.

=== Designs ===
An early rejected design of Haseo

Haseo and Ovan's visual appearances were designed by Seiichiro Hosokawa. They were Hosokawa's first creations on becoming a professional during his rookie days at CyberConnect2. Matsuyama stated that he was mainly influenced by Manji, the main character of the manga Blade of the Immortal by Hiroaki Samura, in designing Haseo. In some scenes at the game's beginning, Haseo was designed with a scary look. Originally CyberConnect2 intended his first design to include more clothing, including a cape covering his body, but they ended up with a design that revealed more of his skin. The cape was meant to conceal Haseo's weaponry, but the team feared issues with how the graphics would handle this. There was a lot of trial and error working on this.

When creating the 3rd Form, Matsuyama said that Haseo's black armor was meant to contrast with his rookie look to the point gamers would question what had happened to him between the series' prologue and the next timeskip. While Hosokawa designed the character, the staff asked fellow artist Yoshiyuki Sadamoto for his input whether it was an appropriate look. As a result, some of the aesthetics from Haseo's design featured in the games' original trailers were removed from the finished product.

For the film .hack//G.U. Trilogy, Matsuyama wanted to give Haseo a different design as he felt retelling the story with the character having the same abilities would not attract returning fans. This was called the "B-st Form" which occurs when Haseo loses his control as Atoli's PC is killed by Ovan. Matsuyama wanted Haseo to be given more realistic expressions, resulting in alterations to his design. In the film's trailers, Haseo's B-st form was kept secret to the point Matsuyama joked that they might be different characters.

In the new storyline provided for .hack//G.U. Last Recode, Hosokawa gave Haseo a new form, titled 5th. In early designs it was similar to the Xth as Haseo still wore a white shirt which was only altered with black areas on its right sleeve. It was next replaced in favor of two armors covering Haseo's body with gear following him. This idea was scrapped in favor of a halfnaked look, with Haseo's abdomen being exposed. The design of his body went through multiple revisions, including changes to the chest's black points. His hair was originally meant to be black, but Hosokawa ended up going back to its silver tone. Haseo's main weaponry in this form is known as the Gate of Uroboros (ゲートオブウロボロス). Originally, the team aimed to give Haseo eight black swords, but this ended up being a red sword after scrapping the idea of him being followed by eight graves. His silver hair was originally meant to become black too.

One of the parody scenes involves Haseo marrying Ovan. Itsuki Hoshi designed an alternate take of Haseo wearing a wedding dress. Most of the female staff members from CyberConnect2 argued over who would wear the wedding dress in the parody scene.

=== Casting ===
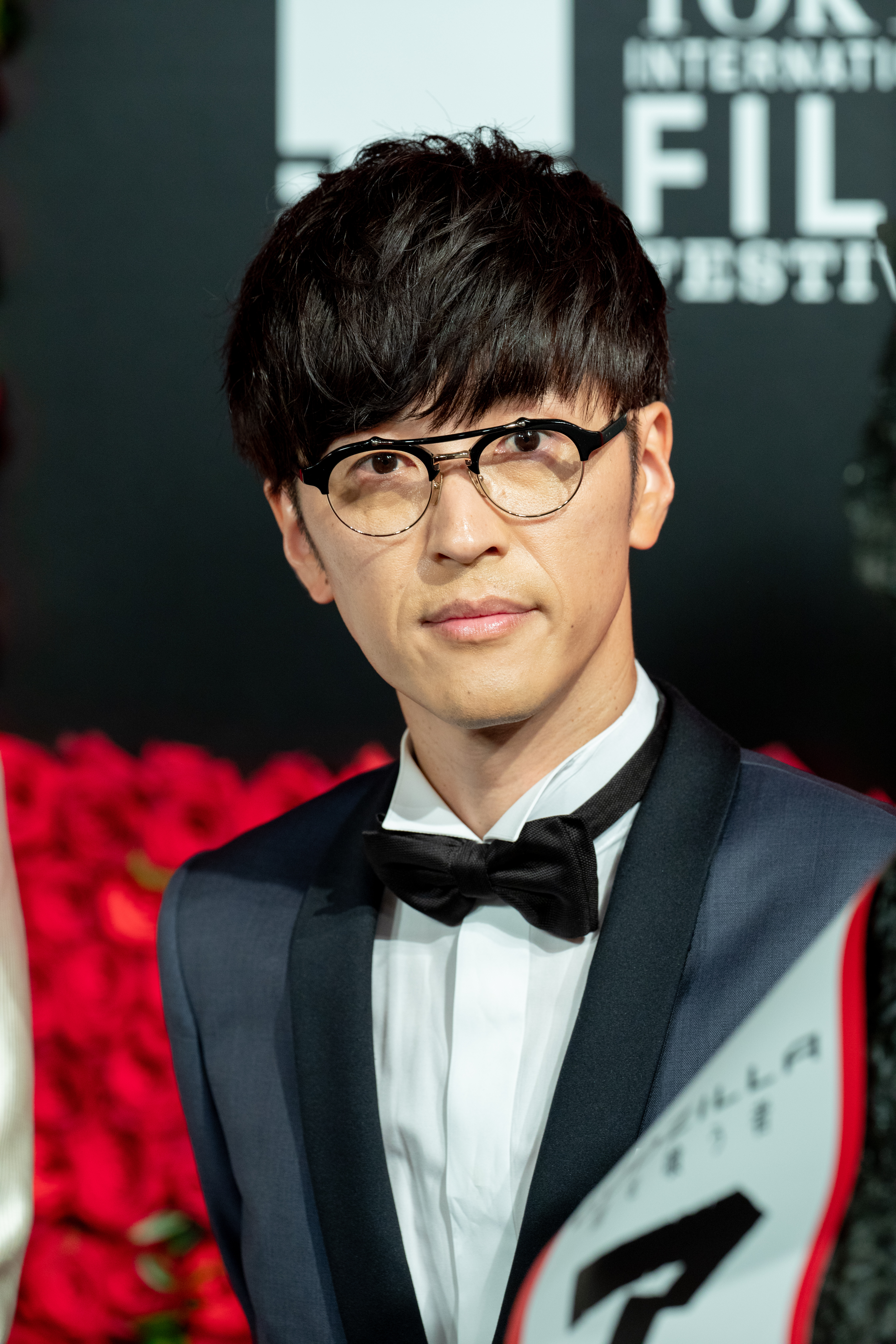
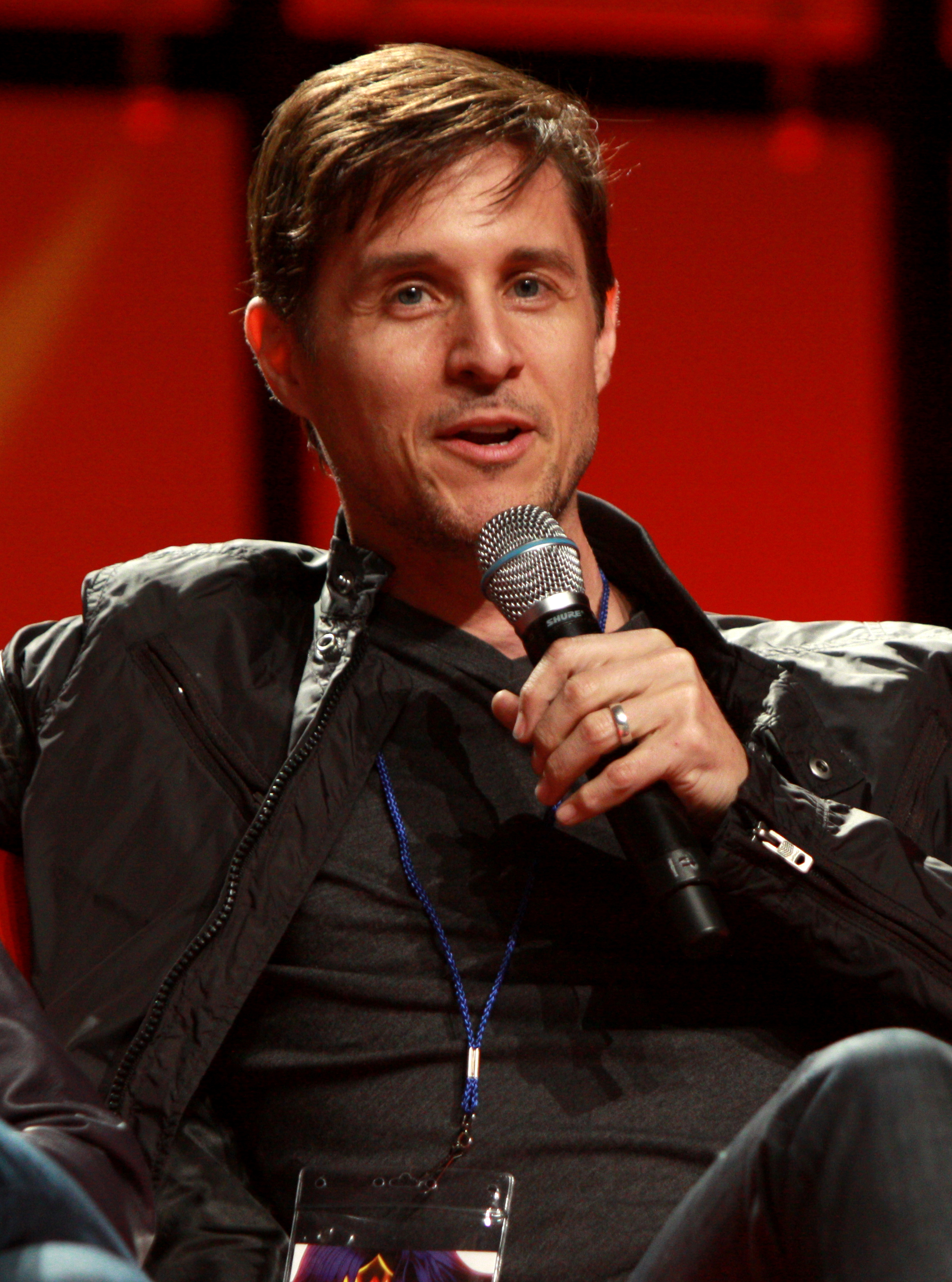
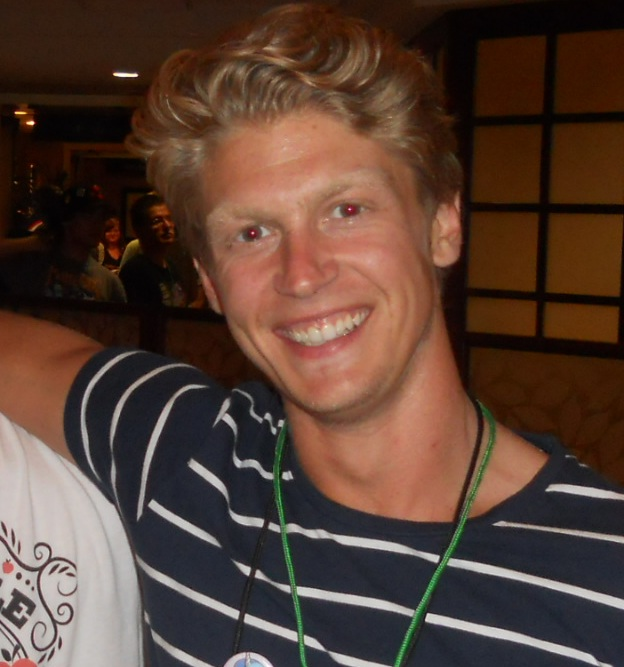
The voice actors for Haseo include Takahiro Sakurai in Japanese, Yuri Lowenthal in the English dub of the games, and Andrew Francis in roots.

When it came to Haseo's scenes in the games, Matsuyama's favorites involved the ones where Haseo summoned the avatar Skeith. Takahiro Sakurai's performance as Haseo yelling at his avatar to summon it surprised the director. CyberConnect2 wrote multiple joke videos, finding Sakurai suitable to act in them despite him finding this messy. Sakurai expressed exhaustion when talking about his work, considering he had to portray Haseo in different sorts of media. Motivated by Matsuyama, Sakurai explained he had fun with his work, especially as he had to work hard to make it appealing. This was most notable in the CGI film. Matsuyama made many suggestions to Sakurai for the Trilogy film, including how he should act in one scene because of his many yells.

In the English version, Yuri Lowenthal was first cast to voice Haseo in the games. However, since the dub of .hack//Roots was produced separately from that of .hack//G.U., Haseo was voiced instead by Andrew Francis for the anime series. Lowenthal came to like Haseo based on his character arc to the point of cosplaying as him. The actor has noted that numerous fans commented that Haseo is similar to another character he plays, Naruto's Sasuke Uchiha. Lowenthal agreed based on their antisocial characterization, but felt both of them undergo different character arcs.

== Appearances ==
=== .hack//G.U. games ===
While Haseo's PC evolves across the video games (from left to right), Matsuyama also wanted his hair to be modified to symbolize his character arc.

Haseo is introduced in the .hack//G.U. games as a famous player from "The World", a player killer known as "The Terror of Death". He is searching for the legendary player killer Tri-Edge, who left his friend Shino in a coma in real life after killing her character. He is guided by his former comrade, Ovan, to fight the AI Azure Kite under the assumption he is Tri-Edge. However, Haseo loses the fight and the PC completely reset. As a result, Haseo is mistaken for a new player by Gaspard and Silabus, who ask him to become their guildmaster. Haseo also agrees to join the guild G.U. led by Yata, a System Administrator in The World R:2, to discover the reason behind a sudden increase in AIDA activity and Tri-Edge using it to leave players in a coma. Haseo gains an "Avatar", Skeith, The Terror of Death, hidden within his PC, that has the ability to destroy AIDA. Although initially cold and antisocial, Haseo comes to appreciate the friendships he makes across the trilogy. He also starts developing feelings for Atoli, a fellow player who encourages him to appreciate his time in The World, but is not until a later part of the trilogy that Haseo understands his feelings.

Using Skeith, Haseo defeats Azure Kite, but none of Tri-Edge's victims recover. He continues working with G.U. to eliminate the AIDA that has been infecting other players and learn more about Tri-Edge. During the .hack//G.U. games, Haseo becomes a friendly person and learns to depend on others, coming to terms with his dark past. He eventually learns that the real Tri-Edge is Ovan. Ovan has been planning on Haseo to develop his Avatar abilities by fighting against multiple enemies so that he would gain enough power to destroy Ovan's own Avatar completely. In their final fight, an overwhelmed Ovan uses his Avatar's abilities to delete AIDA across the network, awakening most of the comatose players. Following this, a being called Cubia awakens and starts devouring The World; its destruction would result in the death of all the players who have yet to recover. Since the Avatars are Cubia's counterpart, Haseo and G.U. join forces to destroy their enemy using Skeith. Following Cubia's defeat, Shino awakens, much to Haseo's relief. An extended ending has Haseo telling Shino that he believes Ovan will return after suffering an hallucination of him.

In the HD release of the trilogy, a new chapter involves Haseo working with Pi to find a way to awake Ovan. Ovan's PC was found frozen in the World as his body remains in a coma in the real world. As Haseo searches for a way to save Ovan, he meets Zelkova's self-proclaimed sister Kusabira tells who tells him his brother disappeared after coming into contact with a monster known Vegalta. Haseo saves Zelkova from the enemy but fails to defeat it. Once recovered, Zelkova uses the data of Kusabira to fully mix the eight Epitaphs powers Skeith had absorbed into Haseo's PC. With this newfound "5th Form", Haseo and Kusabira are successful at reviving Ovan, with Kusabira being revealed as the personification of AIDA. Haseo and Ovan to defeat Vegalta with their combined Avatars. Afterwards, the two go on a final quest to remember their old times in the Twilight Brigade.

=== G.U. related series and adaptations ===
Haseo has also appeared in the anime television series .hack//Roots, where he is depicted as a new player who is invited to join Ovan's Twilight Brigade and search for a legendary item known as the Key of Twilight. While dealing with a rival guild, TaN, Ovan disappears, and the other members abandon the guild, leaving only Shino and Haseo. When Shino ends up in a coma after being attacked by Tri-Edge, Haseo becomes depressed and seeks revenge. In his quest for power, Haseo meets the AI of The World's creator, Harald Hoerwick, who greatly upgrades Haseo's PC. In the following months, he becomes known as "The Terror of Death" after defeating one hundred player killers, and meets Ovan again, who directs him to Azure Kite. This leads to the events of the .hack//G.U. games as a weakened Haseo continues his journey. An OVA titled .hack//Returner shows Haseo reuniting with his former comrades from G.U. and the Twilight Brigade following the events of the trilogy after receiving an email from the disappeared Ovan.

In the manga adaptation of the games, .hack//G.U.+, Haseo is confronted by Ovan shortly after defeating Azure Kite. When Ovan disappears while awakening the comatose players, the player behind Haseo, Ryou Misaki, temporarily quits The World until he receives an e-mail from Ovan's sister, Aina. He returns to The World to investigate what happened to Ovan, but loses his Avatar after being attacked by Kazumi, a member from CC Corp. As Kazumi tries to use Cubia to control The World, Haseo rejoins G.U. to defeat Kazumi. In the novel series, Haseo learns that he has amnesia and that seven years before the events of .hack//G.U. he was a character named Sora who was left in a coma by Skeith until the monster's defeat. After accepting his past, Haseo gains a new form that replaces his Xth Form.

The 2008 CGI film adaptation of the games, .hack//G.U. Trilogy, shows Haseo healing the AIDA-infected Atoli by combining their PCs. When Ovan leaves Atoli and all the G.U. members in coma, Haseo is consumed by rage and attacks Ovan in the new B-st Form. With help from Atoli's PC, Haseo gains the stronger Xth Form, which he uses to defeat Ovan and save him from dying using his last forces to wake up the comatose players.

=== Other appearances ===
In the video game .hack//Link, Haseo's time with the Twilight Brigade and G.U. during Tokio's journey in the 2017 timeline is shown. In 2020, Haseo's PC joins the Twilight Knights with Tokio and the other new members as they prepare for the final battle with a virus-infected Aura, the goddess of The World. In the manga version, Haseo's story is different. His memories have been tampered with to make him believe he is still searching for Tri-Edge to avenge Shino. The .hack//Link Special DVD shows a side story in which Haseo teams up with Asbel from Tales of Graces; both are voiced by Takahiro Sakurai. Outside the .hack franchise, Haseo's Xth Form outfit has appeared as downloadable content in the video game Tales of Graces F. He also appears in the crossover Project X Zone 2.

In the novel, .hack//Cell, Haseo appears in his quest for Tri-Edge. The .hack//4Koma manga features a series of omakes where Haseo has a rivalry with Kite over who is the best protagonist from the franchise. He is also a playable character in the fighting game .hack//Versus.

== Critical reception ==
Haseo's character and his voice actors have been popular with fans. This has been the case with both the .hack//G.U. games and the CGI film where he ranks as the most popular character. In two other polls held to commemorate the .hack franchise's 10th anniversary Haseo was voted its most popular character. CyberConnect2 noted the character was popular with cosplayers. Takahiro Sakurai was a nominee in the category Best Leading Actor for his role as Haseo in .hack//Roots for the first Seiyu Awards but lost to fellow Code Geass voice actor Jun Fukuyama who portrayed Lelouch vi Britannia. Lowenthal's performance was also noted as one best from 2017, although he lost to Kyle McCarley who voiced 9S in Nier Automata. Matsuyama noted that thanks to Last Recode, Haseo's popularity has risen with a figure of the 3rd Form being developed. He claimed that the Xth and 5th Form might get their own figures based on their popularity. An AR contest was also held in Japan involving Haseo in 2022. The company Namco Bandai has inserted an AR model of Haseo into the Styly Mobile app. Bandai Namco has been holding contests in Japan to promote the new Nintendo Switch port of .hack//G.U. Last Recode. In promoting Last Recode advertisements that parody Haseo were made where the character talks to the audience; in one promotion Haseo claims to be popular teenager in need of a girlfriend.

Critical reception to the character has been mixed. IGN compared his character with multiple anime heroes distinguishable from darker tone, which led to earnly negative response. However, his growth into a more caring character led to positive response. GamesRadar disliked how Haseo loses most of his powers but still retains his manners when the game begins. The design Haseo uses was generally praised for his unlockable weapons and Avatar. RPGFan and Push Square felt that Haseo's character arc was one of the strongest parts of the narrative because he changes from an antisocial teenager to a friendly heroic PC instead. Game Informer regarded .hack//GU as a guilty pleasure because he enjoyed the handling of Haseo's personality and the way he becomes stronger across the trilogy even if he comes across as too unsympathetic in the beginning. Yuri Lowenthal's a performance as Haseo was also well received by the media. Francis' and Takahiro Sakurai's performances were viewed positively by Anime News Network.

Writers commented on Haseo's role in other media. For the anime series .hack//roots DVDTalk found Haseo to be an enjoyable protagonist, especially for viewers who have watched previous series. However, the relationship with Shino was criticized as "melodrama" by the same by the same writer, though the scenario might not come off as unrealistic. Because of Haseo's constant quest for power, his screen time during the anime was criticized as weak to the point the reviewer stopped liking it. Following Shino's coma, the media was divided whether Haseo's darker persona was interesting or not. Mania Entertainment found Haseo's skills useless in combat but liked his relationship with the Twilight Brigade as the cast's personalities are explored as the premise focuses on players interacting with each other.

Critics have also commented on media related to the games. IGN's take on the manga earned it a positive response because Haseo's quest is compelling thanks to player killers being something that does not discourage online gamers. Despite calling him a "ruthless fighter", Carlo Santos of Anime News Network commented that Haseo's wish to save Shino makes him an appealing character. Manga News felt that Haseo was a more striking character in the manga than in other versions because his cold personality contrasts with other shonen manga protagonists. However, the reviewer criticized his change into a more traditional hero finding that Haseo loses most of his charisma following Ovan's defeat and that his love triangle with Atoli and Shino is poorly handled. Ben Leary from Mania Entertainment felt the novel version of Haseo more enjoyable due to focus on his mind. Critics have also mentioned Haseo's role in Trilogy. Though finding Haseo unlikable in the CGI film, The Fandom Post and Anime News Network felt Haseo's interactions with Atoli allowed him to mature and become a stronger character in the process.

Dengeki Online referred to Haseo as a surprisingly dark hero as he is neither innocent or pure as he shows dark traits as a result of Shino falling into a coma and thus is obsessed with revenge. This is further exemplified by his past as a player killer as he originally attacks possible suspicious player killers who could be Tri-Edge to the point the audience would find it hard to take seriously that Haseo is the trilogy's protagonist. While Haseo has setbacks and meets various people, he always remains as a dark hero. As a result, the website said he would instead resonate with people who have a middle schooler in their heart.

National Chiao Tung University noted that despite the character's negative mentality, he becomes a tragic hero when Shino falls into a coma and spends nearly his entire appearances working to save her. As he tries to solve anything through brute force, the writer noticed this changes when meeting Atoli and starts maturing as a person which is limited in the Trilogy movie. Nevertheless, Haseo's interactions with Atoli were compared with the idea of society insistes really on playing online video games. While Trilogy revolves mostly around Haseo's anger when dealing with Tri-Edge and achieving revenge, the film makes heavy emphasis on developing a romance between Haseo and an infected Atoli; songs by Tomoyo Mitani that detail the couple when Haseo saves Atoli not by brute force but instead by comforting her.

In a feature article, RPGamer praised the development involving the duo of Haseo and Atoli in the trilogy, noticing their mutual interest is well handled as they are portrayed as realistic teenagers falling in love with each other despite meeting initial out of pure little interest. Capsule Monster also praised Haseo's design for its continuous evolutions in the .hack games as he keeps becoming capable of wielding new types of weapons. The same site positively compared with Kirito from Sword Art Online for coming across as more appealing as a result of his own skills while dealing with guilds as well as coming across with different type of quests related to damsels in distress. In the book The Anime Ecology: A Genealogy of Television, Animation, and Game Media, Haseo and Tsukasa are regarded as negative stereotypes of gamers as both are sometimes featured trapped in the game for several cycles of violence. Famitsu enjoyed Haseo's 5th Form due to his multiple abilities despite losing his original weapons and looked forward to his journey to find the missing Ovan.
