= .hack//G.U. =

Video game series

- Cover of .hack//G.U. Vol.1//Rebirth
- Genre: Action role-playing
- Developer: CyberConnect2
- Publisher: Bandai Namco Entertainment
- Creator: Hiroshi Matsuyama
- Artists: Yoshiyuki Sadamoto; Seiichiro Hosokawa
- Writers: Tatsuya Hamazaki; Kazunori Itō; Miu Kawasaki
- Composer: Chikayo Fukuda
- Platforms: PlayStation 2; PlayStation 4; Microsoft Windows; Nintendo Switch
- First release: .hack//G.U. Vol.1//Rebirth; May 18, 2006
- Latest release: .hack//G.U. Last Recode; November 1, 2017
- Parent series: .hack

.hack//G.U. is a series of single-player action role-playing games for the PlayStation 2, developed by CyberConnect2 and published by Bandai Namco Entertainment between 2006 and 2007. The series contains three games: .hack//G.U. Vol. 1//Rebirth, (Note: Resurrection (再誕, Saitan)) .hack//G.U. Vol. 2//Reminisce (Note: The Voice that Thinks of You (君思フ声, Kimi Omou Koe)) and .hack//G.U. Vol. 3//Redemption. (Note: At a Walking Pace (歩くような速さで, Aruku you na Hayasa de)) As in the previous .hack games, .hack//G.U. simulates a massively multiplayer online role-playing game (MMORPG) called The World—the player controls a character who plays the fictional online game. They were directed by Hiroshi Matsuyama who aimed to address criticisms of the previous series. Its narrative, by Tatsuya Hamazaki, was written concurrently with .hack//Roots, an anime set before the events of the games produced by Bee Train, which depicts Haseo's first days in The World. The series has also been adapted into a manga, a light novel, and an animated film.

The story focuses on a character named Haseo. He hunts another player named "Tri-Edge" who killed his friend Shino within the game which caused her to be left in a coma in real life. Haseo joins an organization that is also tracking Tri-Edge. The reason Shino and other players fall into comas is connected with AIDA, a mysterious computer anomaly that infects their characters.

Critical reception to the games upon release was mixed, with reviewers focusing on how the developers dealt with the issues regarding the previous .hack games and the execution of the storyline across the three titles. The first game got higher ratings; critics praised the addition of new gameplay features, while parts from the story focused on developing the cast beyond Haseo himself and their relation with him had been labeled as filler despite such advancing the purpose of the greater story, Haseo's own development, and such sidestories fitting with .hack 's motif of the time as framing itself as a story occurring within the world of an MMORPG and defined by a set player's experience in that realm. A high-definition remaster of the trilogy, .hack//G.U. Last Recode, was released for PlayStation 4 and Microsoft Windows in November 2017, and was released on Nintendo Switch in March 2022. The remaster marks the first time that .hack//G.U. was released in Europe. The collection received more praise than the original trilogy due to such solving some issues with the gameplay and presentation.

== Gameplay ==
The player's party, consisting of Haseo, Endrance, and Kuhn, is battling Sirius, another player. The pink color of Sirius' target box indicates that a Rengeki may be performed on him.

.hack//G.U. simulates a massively multiplayer online role-playing game (MMORPG); players assume the role of a participant in a fictional game called The World. While in The World, the player controls the on-screen player character, Haseo, from a third-person perspective (with optional first-person mode). The player may control the camera using the game controller's right analog stick. Within the fictional game, players explore monster-infested fields and dungeons as well as "Root Towns" that are free of combat. They also can "log-off" from the game and return to a computer desktop interface which includes in-game e-mail, news, and message boards, as well as desktop and background music customization options. In Reminisce, an optional card game called "Crimson VS" becomes available. The player may save the game to a memory card both from the desktop and within The World at a Save Shop. After the player completes the game, a Data Flag appears on the save file, which allows the transfer of all aspects of the player character and party members to the next game in the series. This can also be applied to previous games if the player first finished the Reminisce or Redemption.

Root Towns are non-combat areas in The World. The player may restock on items, buy equipment, or chat and trade with other "players" of The World. The player may also undertake optional quests and visit guilds. A key feature of all towns is the Chaos Gate. This blue portal is used to travel between towns (called "servers") as well as access the fields and dungeons where battles take place. A password system controls the characteristics of each area. Depending on the characteristics of each word in the three word phrase, the resulting area may have different attributes such as prevalence of monsters or items, among other features.

.hack//G.U. is an action role-playing game; players attack monsters in real time. However, the action pauses whenever the menu is opened in order to select magic to cast, items to use, or skills to perform. The player only directly controls Haseo; the other characters are controlled by the game itself. The player may either provide guidelines ("Free Will", "Rage", "Life", etc.) or issue direct commands (for example, to cast a particular magic at a particular enemy) to the computer-controlled characters. Monsters roam the environments freely or guard treasure chests. Once combat is initiated, via a "surprise attack" or the player being spotted, a wall erects around the combat area to prevent escape. Weapons give the player access to the Skill Trigger feature which allows Haseo to perform a powerful attack. At his initial power level, Haseo can only wield dual short swords; he earns the right to equip additional weapons like broadswords and scythes over the course of the game. In Reminisce, he gains the ability to instantly change weapons in the middle of combat and scan the enemy for weapon weaknesses. If a party lands a large combo against an enemy with one of those hits being a regular attack, the victim becomes vulnerable to an enhanced type of Skill Trigger called "Rengeki" upon the landing of the regular attack. Rengeki attacks deal double damage, give an experience point bonus, and fill the aggressor party's Morale gauge, which allows the party to use a combination attack. Certain plot-related fights, called "Avatar battles", use a different interface which incorporates shoot 'em up gameplay elements. After depleting the opponent's health, players must charge up a "Data Drain" to end the battle.

== Plot ==
=== Setting ===
.hack//G.U. takes place in an alternate version of Earth in the year 2017. As depicted in the first .hack game series, the "2nd Network Crisis" was an incident that occurred seven years ago in which many computer systems across Japan malfunctioned. Through the efforts of those games' hero, Kite, the incident resulted in the birth of Aura, the ultimate artificial intelligence (AI), capable of making decisions for itself. Under the guidance of Aura, The World, the most popular MMORPG at the time, flourishes and the events of .hack//Legend of the Twilight occur during this four-year period.

In late 2014, Aura disappears, resulting in the slow decay of The World and the Internet as a whole. In response, the company that administrates The World, CC Corp, sets up "Project G.U." and tasks them with remedying the problem. They come up with the "Restore Aura (RA) Plan", in which they attempt to retrieve the fragments of Morganna—an AI that served as Aura's "mother"—and seal them into player characters (PCs) of The World. In theory, this would allow the Project G.U. programmers to manipulate the Morganna program to recreate Aura. Only certain "chosen" players could control these special "Epitaph PCs".

After locating candidates to operate the Epitaph PCs, the team proceeds to test the RA Plan despite concerns over "anti-existences" that might damage the Internet. The program fails catastrophically and destroys over 80% of the data for The World. Instead of trying to salvage the data, CC Corp develops The World R:2 and releases it to a new generation of players. However, this new game is less popular than its predecessor and becomes plagued by "player killers" (PKs), players who target other players for fun and sport. The Epitaph PCs which had been lost during the RA Plan disaster resurface in the new version, attached to certain players of interest.

=== Characters ===
The main characters of the series: (top row) Yata, Ovan, (2nd row) Pi, Kuhn, Alkaid, (3rd row) Endrance, Haseo, Atoli, Aina, (bottom row) Saku, Bo.

The main playable character of .hack//G.U. is Haseo, a player of The World whose friend Shino fell into a coma after being attacked by a PK named "Tri-Edge" within the game. As a result, Haseo becomes obsessed with gaining the strength to defeat Tri-Edge and save Shino—he earns the nickname "Terror of Death" for his relentless hunting of PKs. As an Epitaph PC, Haseo is recruited into the new incarnation of Project G.U., which now handles debugging of The World. Yata, who played a key role in the events of .hack under the name Wiseman, leads Project G.U., while other Epitaph PCs including Kuhn and Pi make up the rest of the group. Haseo's hostile nature attracts the attention of Atoli, a member of the peace-loving Moon Tree guild, who resolves to befriend him. Haseo is also searching for Ovan, Haseo's and Shino's former guildmaster who disappeared during .hack//Roots under mysterious circumstances.

=== Story ===
==== Vol. 1//Rebirth ====
After months of searching, Haseo finally encounters Tri-Edge and attempts to kill him but is hopelessly outmatched. In the battle, Tri-Edge uses an illegal skill on Haseo, Data Drain, which corrupts his character data and resets it to level one. Lacking the strength he once had, Haseo meets two friendly players, Silabus and Gaspard, who invite him to join their guild. Haseo is also approached by Kuhn and Pi who recruit him into Yata's organization of Epitaph PCs, players who can summon Avatars. This group's goal is to protect The World from AIDA, a mysterious software bug that has been infecting parts of the game which can only be defeated using an Avatar.

During this time, Haseo is contacted repeatedly by Atoli, a gentle healer from Moon Tree guild who tries to convince him to enjoy the game and its world more. He is brusque and standoffish with her because her character model strongly resembles Shino's but she persists in trying to befriend him. Haseo awakens his Avatar, Skeith, while fighting in a tournament and he prevails over the champion Endrance, who was being controlled by AIDA. After Endrance's defeat, Atoli finds a strange red mark made by Tri-Edge and falls into the portal it creates. Haseo, Pi, and Kuhn follow her through the warp and see her struggling to open a locker in a white void. Tri-Edge ambushes them but they manage to defeat him. After he fades away, the locker opens to reveal AIDA, which infects Atoli.

==== Vol. 2//Reminisce ====
Haseo and the G.U. staff find themselves trapped inside the game, physically unable to leave or log out. Atoli recovers, but is rendered mute, able to communicate only through instant messages. Yata explains that AIDA has copied The World's server, trapping everyone inside to experiment on them. They transfer everyone back to CC Corp's servers to escape. Ovan directs Haseo to gather the Epitaph PCs together to solve the mystery of AIDA. Shortly afterwards, Haseo is approached by a player named Alkaid, concerned for her friend Sirius, who has been possessed by AIDA. They enter into a tournament to fight Sirius, but Alkaid is ambushed by the AIDA-infected PK Bordeaux, which leaves her in a coma. Haseo requests Endrance's assistance for the rest of the tournament. They defeat Sirius and purge him of the AIDA that had stolen Atoli's Epitaph.

With Atoli's Epitaph returning, she also recovers. However, her superior from Moon Tree, Sakaki, pushes her into a depressed fugue that leaves her vulnerable to AIDA again. Sakaki attacks his own guild to provoke Atoli into using her Avatar; he seeks to manipulate her and AIDA so he can gain control of the real world through the Internet. Haseo saves Atoli and defeats Sakaki after he purposely contaminates himself with AIDA in a last-ditch effort to gain control of the network. Following this, Ovan appears and reveals that he is the real Tri-Edge—his left arm contains the first hostile AIDA. The enemy that Haseo had believed was Tri-Edge is actually Azure Kite, one of three AIs that Aura had created to destroy the AIDAs. Ovan orchestrated Shino's and Alkaid's attacks and Sakaki's betrayal in order to push Haseo into becoming strong enough to kill the AIDA possessing him. Though Haseo succeeds in defeating Ovan, the coma victims do not recover.

==== Vol. 3//Redemption ====
With AIDA corruption spreading throughout the Internet, CC Corp executives fire Yata from Project G.U. and replace him with Sakaki. Mad with power, Sakaki forces Haseo into a tournament filled with AIDA-corrupted PKs. Haseo prevails in the tournament and defeats Sakaki. Haseo and the others find Yata who awakens as an Epitaph PC. They meet Ovan's sister, Aina, who has been trapped in The World after Ovan's AIDA attacked her. With all the Epitaph PCs awakened, Ovan challenges Haseo to another fight. In defeat, Ovan is able to use his Avatar's special ability "The Rebirth" which completely resets the Internet and cleanses it of AIDA, though he falls into a coma as a result. The G.U. members are saved by Zelkova, leader of Moon Tree, who reveals that Ovan's actions caused several comatose players to wake up, though others are still trapped within the game. Yata discovers the cause: an "anti-existence" called Cubia is trying to devour The World, resulting in the death of all players.

Aina summons Aura who hints to the party that the key to defeating Cubia is the eight Avatars. Haseo calls on all the players of The World to help in defending against Cubia's minions. With the combined powers of the eight Epitaph PCs including Ovan's spirit, Haseo destroys Cubia. With Cubia gone, all the remaining comatose players awake and Haseo meets Shino once again. Upon meeting her, Shino motivates Haseo to be more honest with his feelings which causes him to pursue Atoli. A hidden ending in the Forest of Pain shows Haseo a vision of Ovan; Haseo declares that they will meet again.

==== Vol. 4//Reconnection ====
One year and three months after Cubia's destruction, Haseo learns from Pi that Ovan's body has been located in The World frozen in ice. Due to Skeith becoming destabilized, Zelkova seals Haseo's Avatar. Haseo is unable to shatter Ovan's ice prison. Haseo then meets Kusabira who informs him of an attack on the Net Slum a few days before at the hands of a gigantic monster created by the game's network issues, Vegalta. Kusabira tells Haseo that Vegalta has consumed Zelkova, her brother, and asks Haseo to save him before he dies. Haseo confronts the monster and frees Zelkova, who remarks that he does not have a sister but surmises her true identity. Kusabira is a remnant of AIDA that had developed human-like AI, and she called him her brother because he, too, is an AI native to The World. Zelkova uses Kusabira's data to pacify Skeith's power and unseals the Epitaph, unlocking Haseo's final form and granting him access to the powers of all the Epitaphs at will.

Haseo successfully destroys Ovan's ice prison with this new power. Kusabira appears and merges with Ovan, reviving him. Vegalta returns and faces both Haseo and Ovan. With their Epitaphs merged into one being combining Skeith with Corbenik and the others' powers, the duo destroys Vegalta. Ovan reunites with his sister and friends. On the last day of service for The World R:2, Haseo logs on and speaks with each of his friends to say goodbye to the game and them. Ovan invites him on one last adventure through a dungeon and they reflect on their memories together.

== Development ==
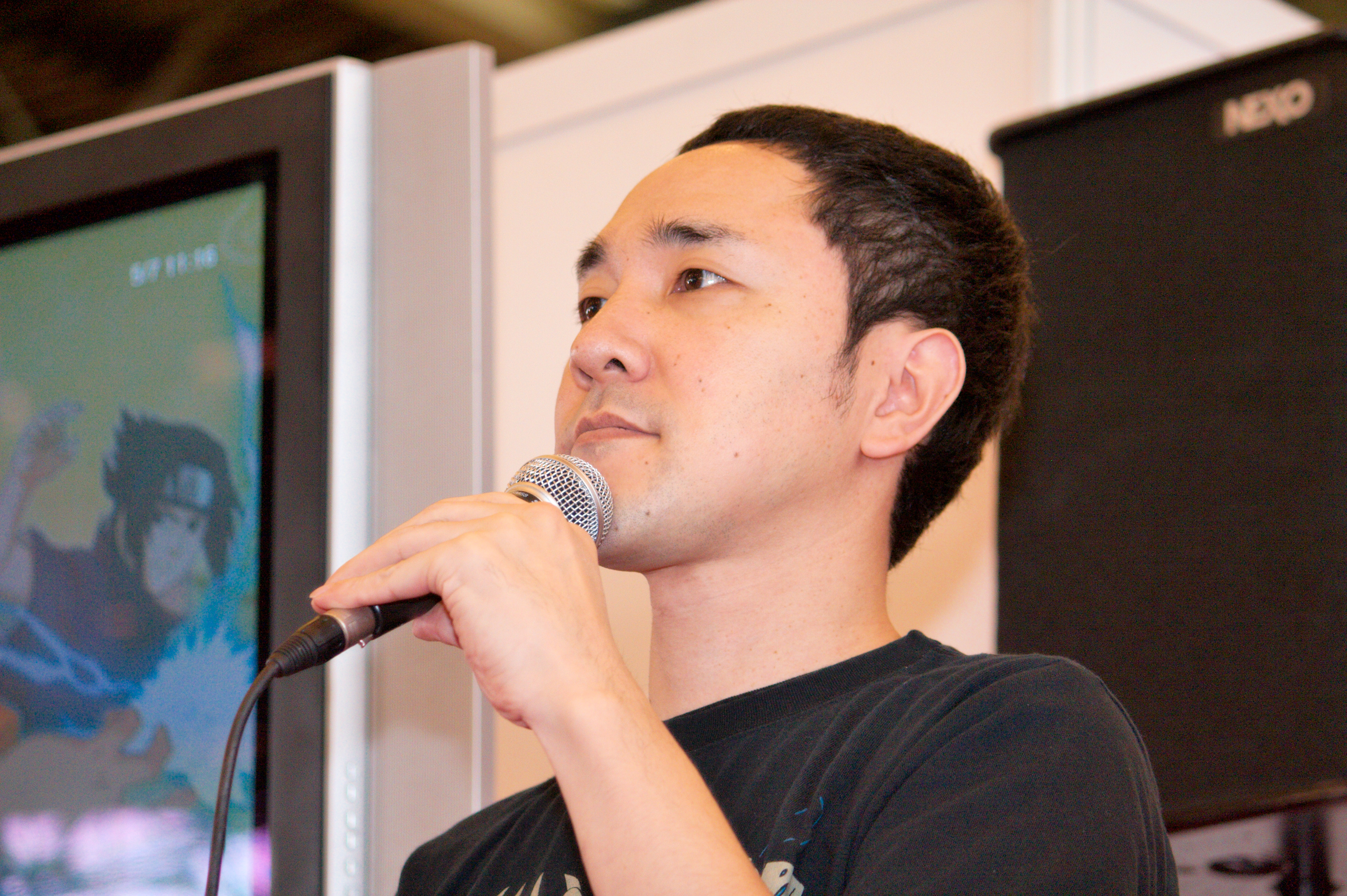
CyberConnect2 CEO Hiroshi Matsuyama worked in the series as director.

Development for .hack//G.U. began in October 2002, towards the end of the first .hack series' production cycle, with CyberConnect2's president Hiroshi Matsuyama as director. It was first announced in June 2004 under the working title of "Project G.U.". Instead of a direct sequel, CyberConnect2 developed it as an independent series with connections to the first .hack series that new players could still enjoy. Players criticized the number of parts in the first .hack series. As a result, .hack//G.U. comprises three games instead of four. The first game's release date was delayed in order to coincide with the start of its manga adaptation and anime companion series. In Japan, the three games were released on May 18, 2006, September 28, 2006, and January 18, 2007, respectively. In North America, they were published on October 24, 2006, May 8, 2007, and September 10, 2007.

Graphically and technologically, the game is an improvement on the original .hack series. As a series, the setting and concept presented in the games are darker and more mature than before. In terms of gameplay, .hack//G.U. was made more action-oriented than the first .hack games with Haseo being able to connect combos with other characters from the party. The interactions between the characters outside The World were expanded to further simulate the experience of playing a MMORPG. This was based on .hack and the .hack//SIGN anime in which the characters had to leave The World in order to take care of "real life events." Matsuyama claimed that Rebirth was longer than the four games of the first series combined and that the three .hack//G.U. games would not be "three parts to the same game". Unlike the previous series where the animated tie-in .hack//Liminality was included as a bonus DVD, the development team opted to integrate the animated story into webisodes available in-game. Bandai also released a "Terminal Disc" with the special edition of Rebirth, which further expands the franchise's backstory and bridges the gap between the two game series.

=== Scenario ===
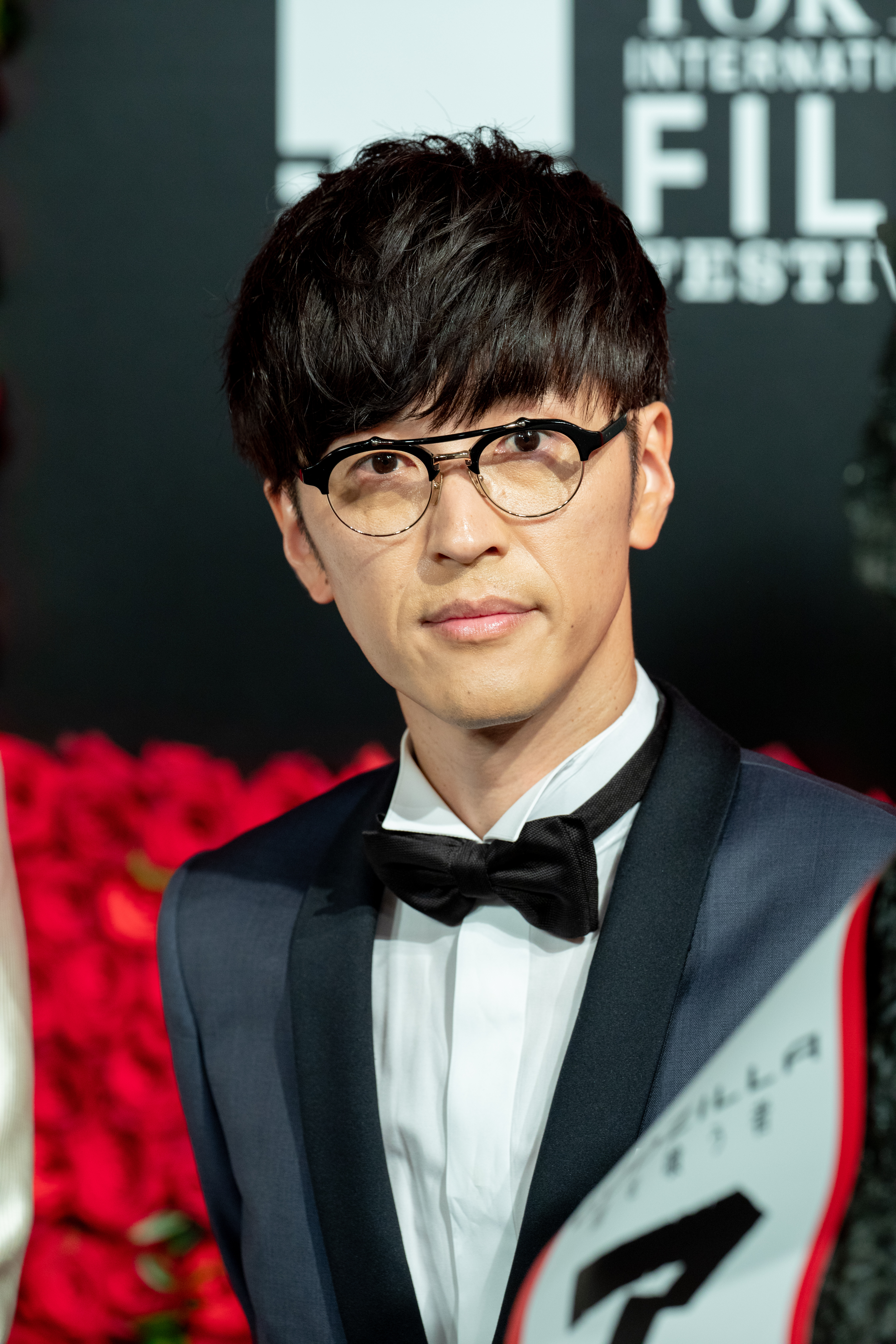
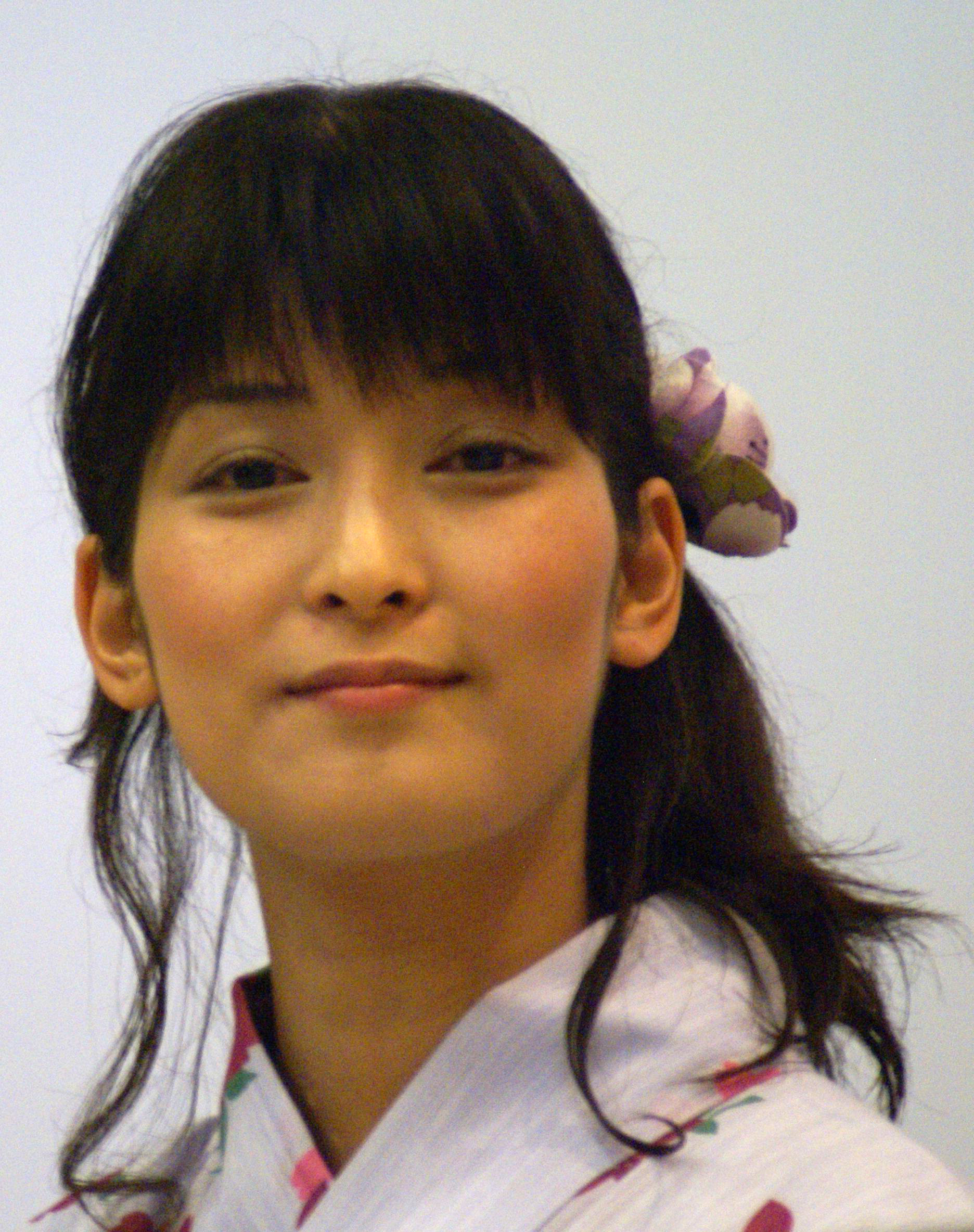
Takahiro Sakurai (left) and Ayako Kawasumi voiced Haseo and Atoli in Japanese, respectively.

Just as .hack and .hack//Sign were conceived as interconnected projects, Matsuyama wanted to do the same with .hack//G.U. and .hack//Roots. This time, he wanted them to feature the same lead character, Haseo. However, it was difficult to keep the writing consistent across projects. Matsuyama brought Tatsuya Hamazaki in to help with this challenge due to his experience working on the previous .hack project. Hamazaki wrote the game's script so the team could focus on developing the game. On Hamazaki's advice, two different writing teams worked on the game and the anime simultaneously. The second game is subtitled "The Voice that Thinks of You" in Japanese; Matsuyama says this refers to the web of relationships between characters, including how Haseo remembers Shino's voice, how Atoli thinks of Haseo, and most importantly what Ovan means to Haseo.

Matsuyama has stated that the acronym "G.U." has twelve meanings related to the plot of the games but the central theme is "growing up" in many respects. Haseo grows up as a character over the course of the series, developing his inter-personal skills and his worldliness. Matsuyama considered Kite, the lead of the previous games, as a kind and relatable character and thus wanted the new game to feature a different type of lead character. In contrast, Haseo begins the series with a vengeful personality similar to main characters of shonen manga who exhibit iconic traits such as "rage, despair, conflict, courage, and victory".

Haseo and Ovan were designed by Seiichiro Hosokawa. They were Hosokawa's first creations as a rookie at CyberConnect2. The staff asked previous artist Yoshiyuki Sadamoto for feedback on the character. As a result, some aesthetics from Haseo's design featured in the games' original trailers were removed from the finished product. Haseo was influenced by Manji from the manga Blade of the Immortal by Hiroaki Samura while Atoli's design was mix between Western and Eastern culture with a bird theme forming her naming and design. For Haseo's Xth form design, his bangs were made to symbolize his continued immaturity. Haseo can pursue a romance with certain other characters over the course of the games. Although Atoli was intended to be the main heroine, the team had issues while writing her to the point that Matsuyama himself chose other characters to romance when playing the game alone. This motivated Matsuyama to make her more appealing for the second chapter of .hack//G.U..

The two leads, Haseo and Atoli, were voiced by Takahiro Sakurai and Ayako Kawasumi. Matsuyama was surprised by Sakurai's performance during Avatar battles where Haseo yells to summon Skeith; these were among Matsuyama's favorites as a result. Kawasumi also enjoyed voicing her character across the series. Other major actors include Megumi Toyoguchi and Mitsuki Saiga. Kaori Nazuka reprised her role as Shino from .hack//Roots. She enjoyed the process due to the friendship she formed with Sakurai and Hiroki Tōchi (Ovan) during the recording of the series. As in the previous games, Matsuyama appears and voices a character in Japanese, this time as Piros the 3rd.

=== Remaster ===
A comparison between the graphics of the remaster

Matsuyama was motivated to remaster the trilogy in 2017 because it was nearing the 15th anniversary of the .hack series and .hack//G.U. takes place in 2017. CyberConnect2 aimed to improve the visuals from the original trilogy to fit the PlayStation 4. They wanted to create something that would meet the expectations of our fans. Thus the modifications to the game to deliver something that would be "fresh and nostalgic". A cheat mode was added to make progress faster. The fights were also revised to increase their speed and reduce any stressful feeling from the original product. In order to improve the game, Last Recode employs a 1080p resolution with a 16:9 widescreen picture and 60 fps.

Matsuyama wanted to use the remaster as an epilogue to Haseo's story and to further promote it, the team designed a new form for combat. The new chapter, Vol. 4//Reconnection, is meant to resolve the cliffhanger at the end of the original trilogy and conclude Haseo's story. The Japanese limited edition features a number of supplemental materials depicting events that take place after the end of the games including a CD drama about Haseo's job working for Pi while also looking after the comatose Ovan, a light novel centered on the supporting cast, and Bee Train's original video animation .hack///G.U. Returner.

.hack//G.U. Last Recode was released for PlayStation 4 and Microsoft Windows on November 1, 2017, in Japan, and on November 3, 2017, in North America and Europe. CyberConnect2 also considered a Nintendo Switch release due to widespread popularity of the system, but their offers were refused by Bandai Namco, citing costs of porting and sales prospects; Matsuyama also named the "long-standing relationship with Sony" and series' history of exclusivity to PlayStation consoles as possible reasons. The Nintendo Switch version was eventually announced in December 2021, and was released worldwide on March 10, 2022.

=== Music ===
.hack//G.U. Game Music O.S.T.

Soundtrack album by Chikayo Fukuda
- Released: September 6, 2006
- Genre: Video game soundtrack
- Length: Disc 1: 71:12; Disc 2: 71:56
- Label: Victor Entertainment

.hack//G.U. Game Music O.S.T. 2

Soundtrack album by Chikayo Fukuda
- Released: January 24, 2007
- Genre: Video game soundtrack
- Length: Disc 1: 71:41; Disc 2: 72:03
- Label: Victor Entertainment

.hack//G.U. Game Music O.S.T. and .hack//G.U. Game Music O.S.T. 2 are the soundtracks for the .hack//G.U. games. The former contains 62 compositions from Rebirth while the latter contains 58 compositions from Reminisce and Redemption. Both soundtracks come with a third disc with special features, such as game trailers, desktop wallpapers, and voice clips. Chikayo Fukuda returned to compose the music for the series. Mitani Tomoyo sang the main themes for the three games. Patrick Gann of RPGFan commended Fukuda's more mature sound, noting a greater emphasis on vocal tracks than before. He praised the use of piano as a key instrument and found this soundtrack to be more memorable overall. Gann also appreciated the wide variety of styles from "silly character themes" and "rock-hard battle themes" to "beautiful piano solos".

.hack//G.U. Game O.S.T.

Disc 1
No.	Title	Length
1.	"Title"	1:39
2.	"Desktop"	1:33
3.	"Top Page"	1:51
4.	"Eternal City Mac Anu"	2:51
5.	"Hy Brasail, the Isle of Kings"	2:10
6.	"Warring City Lumina Cloth"	2:29
7.	"Town Shop"	1:58
8.	"Prairie - Clear"	2:39
9.	"Prairie - Cloudy"	2:36
10.	"Prairie - Evening"	2:41
11.	"Shinto Shrine"	3:16
12.	"Cave"	3:10
13.	"Battle"	2:25
14.	"Battle Victory"	0:51
15.	"Beast God Statue"	2:15
16.	"Doppelganger"	0:54
17.	"Boss Battle"	2:32
18.	"Arena - Lobby"	1:48
19.	"Arena - Entrance"	1:58
20.	"Arena - Red Demon Palace"	2:47
21.	"Arena - Victory"	0:43
22.	"Canard"	2:17
23.	"Raven"	2:00
24.	"Kestrel"	2:27
25.	"Moon Tree"	2:46
26.	"Icolo"	2:05
27.	"Online Jack 1"	0:20
28.	"Online Jack 2"	0:32
29.	"Online Jack 3"	1:02
30.	"Fly, Mecha-Grunty!"	2:12
31.	"Cernunnos Appears"	1:25
32.	"Abyss Quest Battle"	3:46
33.	"Yasashii Ryoute" (English ver.)	4:15

Disc 2
No.	Title	Length
1.	"Dawn Flight ~Opening Loop Demo Vol. 1~"	1:53
2.	"Welcome to The World"	1:09
3.	"Are You a Newbie?"	1:43
4.	"Terror of Death"	2:08
5.	"Arche Koeln Waterfall"	1:58
6.	"Laughing Fangs"	1:32
7.	"Dead World of Indieglut Lugh"	1:51
8.	"Serpent of Lore ~Yata's Theme~"	1:51
9.	"May I Help You?"	1:56
10.	"Big Sis and Me ~Sakubo's Theme~"	2:25
11.	"The Epitaph is Told ~Ovan's Theme~"	2:10
12.	"The Greatest Love ~Endrance's Theme~"	2:10
13.	"Sakaki of the Council of Seven ~Sakaki's Theme~"	2:30
14.	"Grima Raef Cathedral"	2:21
15.	"Slow Doberman ~Piros the 3rd's Theme~"	3:22
16.	"A Victory That Must Be Grasped"	2:41
17.	"I'm Right Here"	2:49
18.	"AIDA"	2:27
19.	"The Whereabouts of "Power" ~VS Tarvos~"	3:31
20.	"Worried Girl"	1:36
21.	"Morrigu Barrow Wall"	2:38
22.	"Two People's Differences ~VS Magus~"	2:51
23.	"To Lose Resolve"	3:25
24.	""She" ~VS Macha~"	2:46
25.	"Victory Party"	2:15
26.	"Honeysuckle ~Shino's Theme~"	1:08
27.	"Everything In These Hands"	4:04
28.	"Yasashii Ryoute" (Japanese ver.)	4:14
29.	"Swaying Emotions"	3:38

.hack//G.U. Game O.S.T. 2

Disc 1
No.	Title	Length
1.	"Over the Mountains ~Opening Loop Demo Vol. 2~"	2:05
2.	"Desert - Clear"	2:32
3.	"Desert - Cloudy"	2:25
4.	"Desert - Evening"	2:25
5.	"Celestial City Dol Dona"	2:39
6.	"Double Prayer ~VS Gorre~"	2:56
7.	"Collapse of the Moon ~Eclipse~"	1:45
8.	"Cobalt Oath ~Arena Holy Palace~"	2:41
9.	"Wailing Capital Wald Uberlisterin"	2:10
10.	"Coite-Bodher Battlefield"	2:45
11.	"To You, Dear"	3:55
12.	"Sugar Mansion Sif Berg"	2:10
13.	"Our Hero! Piros the 3rd! ~Piros the 3rd's Theme Part 2~"	2:19
14.	"Corridor"	2:24
15.	"The Casting Off of Ideals"	2:31
16.	"Here "I" Am"	1:59
17.	"Here I Come ~VS Innis~"	3:16
18.	"Briona Gwydion the Dragonbein Range"	1:40
19.	"Inverted City Megin Fi"	1:50
20.	"Dark Infection ~VS Corbenik~"	2:50
21.	"The Whereabouts of Truth"	4:50
22.	"Speed-Boy"	2:20
23.	"Puchi Running"	2:06
24.	"Winning Cheer"	1:07
25.	"We! The Grunties!!"	2:06
26.	"Great Temple of Caerleon Medb"	2:41
27.	"Gob Gob Gob! ~Theme of the Golden Goblins~"	1:29
28.	"Listen to What I Say! ~Negimaru's Theme~"	1:34
29.	"Tactics Time"	1:58
30.	"Heart of Crimson"	1:56

Disc 2
No.	Title	Length
1.	"Eight Phases Illusions ~Opening Loop Demo Vol. 3~"	1:48
2.	"No More Shallow Dreams ~Aina's Theme~"	2:04
3.	"Avatar Space"	3:00
4.	"Aim for the Sky ~Arena Sage Palace~"	2:23
5.	"Dual City Breg Epona"	2:56
6.	"A Sea of Trees"	2:37
7.	"Nobody Knows ~Zelkova's Theme~"	1:53
8.	"Chain of Fate ~VS Fidchell~"	2:50
9.	"The Brilliant Justice Will Never Fade ~Piros the 3rd's Theme Part 3~"	2:54
10.	"Net Slum Tartarga"	2:11
11.	"Timeless Homeland"	1:42
12.	"The Hope of Dawn"	2:10
13.	"Eight Keys"	2:15
14.	"Final Overture"	1:54
15.	"The Third Crisis ~VS Cubia~"	3:24
16.	"Full Force ~VS Cubia Core~"	2:54
17.	"Final Bout ~VS Frenzied Cubia Core~"	3:03
18.	"You Were Smiling Softly"	5:12
19.	"Dimming Dawn"	5:39
20.	"And the Bells of Fortune Ring"	1:43
21.	"The Path You and I Walk"	1:12
22.	"To Love?!"	1:16
23.	"World of Sin Ran Hati"	1:45
24.	"Forest of Pain"	2:44
25.	"Riddle of the Creator ~Harald's Theme~"	2:42
26.	"Proto Gurah's Appearance"	2:14
27.	"Evil Machine"	1:51
28.	"The Brilliant Justice Will Never Fade ~Another Ver.~" (hidden track)	4:20

== Reception ==
Aggregate review scores
Game	Metacritic
Vol.1//Rebirth	69/100
Vol.2//Reminisce	61/100
Vol.3//Redemption	60/100
Last Recode	PC: 69/100; PS4: 76/100; NS: 76/100

The series has received a lukewarm reception, but positive sales figures. In 2010, CyberConnect2 announced that sales of the .hack games exceeded 3 million combining both the first .hack series and the .hack//G.U. series. Last Recode sold 300,000 copies worldwide. Patrick Gann of RPGFan recognized the development team's efforts to address the problems of the first .hack series, succeeding in some respects and failing in others. Like the first series, .hack//G.U. goes to great lengths to preserve the illusion of playing an online game, through in-game message boards and news reports, and Gann found that these elements gave more depth to the future world he was experiencing. He found fault in the formulaic progression between dungeons, checking email to find the next dungeon, but the battle mechanics were a marked improvement over the original series. Although the graphics were "spectacular", Gann criticized the limited and repetitive dungeon designs.

In his review of Reminisce, Gann noted the relatively good quality of the voice acting, but called the translated script "hit or miss". Yuri Lowenthal's performance as Haseo was also well received, with his acting having aged well across the years. Minor changes to the battle system, such as being able to change weapons at any time, made Reminisce's combat more exciting. While Haseo was criticized for his immature personality in the first game, his development in following games has been praised. He concluded in Redemption that, while not perfect, the three-part format of the series was relatively more worth it than its previous iteration. Redemption has been praised for its new gameplay features although writers lamented that they became available late in the game.

Meghan Sullivan of IGN described the series as an overall improvement over the first series but complained that the Avatar battles were boring and a missed opportunity for a "very cool feature". She also suggested that the storyline could be streamlined by allowing e-mail access within The World. Despite deriding the "filler" story of Rebirth, Sullivan found Reminisce to be much more enjoyable due to its more mature storyline, citing the interactions between the cast. However, she found the new Crimson VS card game to be as "pointless" as the Avatar battles. The overall sentiment conveyed by multiple reviewers was that the new games would appeal to fans of the series, but would have been much better if released as a single game.

The collection Last Recode was better received for bringing resolution to the original trilogy. Josh Torres of RPGSite praised the main narrative and improvements to the graphics. Garri Bagdasarov of PlayStation Universe lamented the lack of variety in dungeons in the first title but welcomed more replay value when facing other enemies. Peter Triezenberg of RPGFan echoed these criticisms but noted that Haseo's character arc was one of the strongest parts of the narrative. Aarón Rodríguez of Meristation also praised the narrative but felt the graphics were still lacking. Ray Porreca of Destructoid liked Haseo's journey in the fourth volume of .hack//G.U. based on the handling of his relationships. The PC port earned positive responses overall though Cody Medellin of WorthPlaying cited issues in the usage of controls and keyboard. Adam Beck of Hardcore Gamer found the content aged well and fitted properly in the PC as there were no framerate drops.

== Related media ==
As part of a larger multimedia franchise, the games have inspired a variety of subsequent novels, manga, and film. An anime television series set before the events of .hack//G.U. was produced by Bee Train under the title of .hack//Roots. The series depicts Haseo's first experiences playing The World. It lasted for twenty-six episodes that aired in Japan between April 5 and September 26, 2006. .hack//G.U.+ serves as a manga adaptation of the game's story. It was published in the .hack//G.U.: The World magazine starting in November 2005 with art by Yuzuka Morita and story by Tatsuya Hamazaki. It was collected in a total of five tankōbon volumes published by Kadokawa Shoten between June 26, 2006, and March 23, 2009. Tokyopop licensed the series for English publication in June 2007 and released all of its volumes, from February 12, 2008, to September 1, 2009.

A novel series written by Tatsuya Hamazaki and illustrated by Yuzuka Morita of the same name retells the story of the games with slight modifications, such as depicting Epitaphs as weapons instead of physical Avatars and a further exploration Haseo's background. Four volumes were published by Kadokawa Shoten between April 1, 2007, and August 1, 2008. Tokyopop published the novels in North America between February 10, 2009, and April 26, 2011. Cyberconnect2 also produced .hack//G.U. Trilogy, an animated film adaptation that abridges the story in order to appeal to players who do not have the time to play all three games. The film was first screened in Japan in a Tokyo theater in December 2007. Bandai Visual later released it in DVD and Blu-ray format on March 25, 2008. In May 2011, Bandai Entertainment announced that they licensed the film for an English release but only with Japanese audio accompanied by English subtitles on August 18, 2009. Following the closure of Bandai Entertainment, Funimation announced at SDCC 2013, that they have acquired the rights to four .hack titles including .hack//G.U. Trilogy. The games' sequel is .hack//Link, a PlayStation Portable game that takes place three years in the future with a new version of The World.
