= Chaser Game W =

2024 Japanese television series

- Official series poster
- チェイサーゲームW
- Genre: Romance, Girls' love
- Based on: Chaser Game by Hiroshi Matsuyama
- Written by: Yū Ohta, Atsushi Asada
- Directed by: Yū Ohta, Masayuki Yamaguchi, Yoshikazu Igi
- Starring: Yūka Sugai; Yurika Nakamura
- Country of origin: Japan
- Original language: Japanese
- No. of episodes: 16

Original release
- Network: TV Tokyo, Dub Corporation
- Release: January 9 – November 9, 2024

Chaser Game W: My Evil Boss is My Ex-Girlfriend (チェイサーゲームW パワハラ上司は私の元カノ) is a 2024 television drama produced by TV Tokyo. It is a spin-off to the Chaser Game series by Hiroshi Matsuyama and features an original story centered around two ex-girlfriend working in the game industry. In 2025 it was adapted into a manga series written by Hoshiteru Hosaka and illustrated by Seiju Natsumegu. A film sequel to the drama was released in May 2026.

== Plot ==
The series follows Harumoto Itsuki, a 27-year-old game developer who now has to work alongside her ex-girlfriend, Hayashi Fuyu, as the companies they work for collaborate on an upcoming video game project.

== Characters ==
=== Main characters ===
Harumoto Itsuki
Portrayed by: Yūka Sugai
A game developer at Dynamic Dream. Itsuki has been working at Dynamic Dream for fives years when she is given the lead for an upcoming project for the mega-title "Tenyo Sekai," a joint Japanese-Chinese production.

Hayashi Fuyu
Portrayed by: Yurika Nakamura
The head of Vincent, a major Chinese content company that is a client of Dynamic Dream. She is also Itsuki's ex-girlfriend.

=== Supporting characters ===
Aoyama Wataru
Portrayed by: Kanta Sato
A freelance journalist and Itsuki's friend from high school.

Nanase Futaba
Portrayed by: Hina Kikuchi
Responsible for visual effects.

Komatsu Risa
Portrayed by: Hikari Kabashima
A 3D animator at Dynamic Dream.

Kubo Yuina
Portrayed by: Nozomi Hanayagi
The cinematic director at Dynamic Dream.

== Media ==
=== Drama ===
Chaser Game W: My Evil Boss Is My Ex-Girlfriend was first announced on November 15, 2023. Unlike the previous Chaser Game television series, which adapted the original manga by Hiroshi Matsuyama, Chaser Game W featured an original story that centered around two ex-girlfriends working in the game industry, though it continues to share the same setting as the original with both taking place at the fictional game development company "Dynamic Dream". The series was produced by TV Tokyo and directed by Yū Ohta, Masayuki Yamaguchi, and Yoshikazu Igi, with Ohta and Atsushi Asada writing the scripts. The series starred Yūka Sugai and Yurika Nakamura in the lead roles. It premiered on TV Tokyo from January 9, 2024, to February 27, 2024. The opening theme, "Midnight Girl", was produced by imase, who also appeared in the drama as himself.

A second season was announced in July 2024, with the cast and staff reprising their roles from the first season. The second season aired from September 20 to November 8, 2024.

=== Manga ===
A manga adaptation began serialization digitally through CyberConnect2 on March 13, 2025. The series was written by Hoshiteru Hosaka and illustrated by Seiju Natsumegu. One volume was released as of May 8, 2025. In July, 2025, CyberConnect2 discontinued the manga, taking down all chapters from digital storefronts. Series artist Seiju Natsumegu wrote on their personal Twitter account that they had not been informed of the decision ahead of time.

=== Film ===
Chaser Game W: The Fellowship of Waterfish, a sequel to the second season of the series, premiered in theatres on May 15, 2026. It is co-produced by CyberConnect2 and Dub Corporation, and distributed in Japan by Nakachika Pictures.

7 years after the events of Chaser Game W2, Itsuki and Fuyu live together with their daughter Tsuki, who is now a junior high school student. Despite the couple's best efforts to maintain a peaceful family life on the surface, Tsuki is acutely aware of their discomfort. One day, Tsuki gets into trouble and is rescued by Kozue, a taxi driver. After that encounter, Itsuki and Fuyu reconcile their true feelings for each other, and attempt to rebuild their love again, as a family.

=== Novel ===
A novelization written by Hoshiteru Hosaka began serialization on January 9, 2026, with new chapters releasing every two weeks.

== Reception ==
Frank Hecker, a staff writer at Okazu, gave the first season an overall 7 out of 10, praising the performances of its lead actors, "Nakamura Yurika does an excellent job portraying Fuyu’s transition from office terror to a woman approaching her breaking point, while former idol Sugai Yūka acquits herself well in the less demanding role of Itsuki", while finding the show's epilogue "a bit rushed and hand-wavy".
