= Hina Kikuchi =

Japanese actress, gravure idol, and model (born 2004)

- 菊地 姫奈
- Born: October 19, 2004 (age 22); Ibaraki Prefecture, Japan
- Occupations: Gravure idol; actress; model
- Years active: 2020–present
- Agent: Blue Label
- Height: 160 cm (5 ft 3 in)
- Website: Official profile

Hina Kikuchi (菊地 姫奈, Kikuchi Hina; born October 19, 2004) is a Japanese actress, gravure idol and model affiliated with Blue Label. She is known for her supporting role as Nanase Futaba in 2024 TV series Chaser Game W.

== Career ==
Hina Kikuchi at the "Miss Magazine 2020" Grand Prix Announcement Press Conference

While she's at second year of junior high school, she auditioned for Miss Teen Japan 2020, and advanced to the finals representing the Kanto Region. Although she did not get the crown, entertainment agency Blue Label scouted her and began career in the modeling industry at the age of 15, and won a modeling awards since then.

== Filmography ==
=== Television ===
Year	Title	Role	Notes	Ref.
2020	Midsummer's Boy: 19452020	Asami Nozaki		
2021	The Romance Manga Artist	High School Girl	Episode 9	
2021	Gekiteki ni Chinmoku	Sachiko Suzuki	Episode 9	
2022	Itoshii Uso: Yasashii Yami	Reiko Honda (middle school era)		
2022	Keshigomu wo Kureta Joshi wo Suki ni Natta	Satomi's middle school classmate	Episodes 1 and 2	
2022	Terminal Station Series	Rika Kawai	Series Finale ep: Tulips	
2023	Host Sozoku Shichaimashita	Mizuho Hamaoka	Episode 5	
2023	Wave, Listen to Me!	Eriko Tano	Episode 7	
2023	The Greatest Teacher	Rin Kaga	Episode 5	
2023	The Best Students: Last Dance	Rin Kaga		
2023	The Best Student: After School One Day	Rin Kaga		
2023	The Best Students: We'll Be Three Years Later	Rin Kaga	Episode 6	
2023	Maybe Koi ga Kikoeru	Minami Otoha		
2024	Chaser Game W	Nanase Futaba		
2024	Transparent Us	Sakura		
2024	Oshi no Ko	Azami Mako		
2024	The Song of the Wicked	Kaori Otaka		
2024	Legendary Boss, Sho	Emi Itagaki	Episode 2	
2024	Younger Boyfriend 2	Kirimura	Episode 3: The Secret Love of a Genius	
2024	The Science Club	Maya Matsutani	Episode 3	
2024	Wingman	Miku Ogawa		
2025	School Lawyer: Finding the Colors of the Stars	Marika Hori		
2025	Even Shrimp Want to Catch a Sea Bream	Rena	Episodes 3 and 4	
2025	Fogdog	Natsumi Asahi	Episodes 1 and 2	
2026	When We Helped a Broken Tree	Juri Morino		

=== Film ===
Year	Title	Role	Notes	Ref.
2022	Mayhem Girls	Kay		
2022	Walking Time: Waiting for That Day			
2023	Manami 100%	Kanna-chan		
2024	We Are Aliens	Misato		
2025	Suicide Notes Laid on the Table	Ran Morimoto		
2025	V. Maria	Maria	Lead role	
2025	Beethoven Fabrication			
2025	Gosh!!	Part-time worker		
2026	Cursed Meme			
2027	The Day We Embraced the Universe			
2027	Gacha	Rinko Shuzenji	Lead role	

=== Music video ===
Year	Title	Artist	Ref.
2023	“Boy”	Ivy to Fraudulent Game	
2024	"Sign"	Lilas Ikuta	

=== Audio drama ===
Year	Title	Role	Notes	Ref.
2021	In a Colorless World, With You	Rin Nishimura		
