= .hack//G.U. Trilogy =

2008 anime film

- Home media cover featuring from left to right: Ovan, Haseo and Atoli
- Directed by: Hiroshi Matsuyama
- Screenplay by: Saeko Hirotsu, Hiroto Niizato
- Starring: Takahiro Sakurai, Ayako Kawasumi, Hiroki Touchi, Kaori Nazuka
- Cinematography: Yoshinari Irikawa
- Music by: Chikayo Fukuda, Norikatsu Fukuda, Tomoyo Mitani, Seizo Nakata
- Production company: .hack Conglomerate
- Distributed by: Bandai Visual; Electronic Arts; Asmik Ace Entertainment
- Release date: January 25, 2008 (Japan)
- Running time: 83 minutes
- Country: Japan
- Language: Japanese

.hack//G.U. Trilogy (Japanese: ドットハック G.U. Trilogy, Hepburn: Dotto Hakku G.U. Trilogy) is a 2008 Japanese CGI anime original video animation (OVA) directed by Hiroshi Matsuyama based on CyberConnect2's games .hack//G.U.. It was released on January 25, 2008, on DVD and Blu-ray format. The OVA features the voice talents of Takahiro Sakurai, Ayako Kawasumi, Hiroki Touchi and Kaori Nazuka. Its story focuses on an online gamer known as Haseo who seeks to find the player killer Tri-Edge who sent his friend Shino on a coma after her character was killed in the game.

Director Matsuyama aimed to retell the story from the .hack//G.U. trilogy but with enhanced visuals, following issues with fans of the series who were not able to play the game as a result of lacking enough free time. Feeling the need to add new content not seen in games, Matsuyama came with the idea of giving Haseo another redesign. The OVA features a theme song "Deepest Memories" by Japanese music artist Tomoyo Mitani.

Upon release, critics were divided in regards to the OVA's narrative, finding it too rushed due to the inclusion of too many characters in too little time but praised the bond Haseo forms with Atoli as well. The presentation, though, received mostly positive response for the fights provided with the visuals as well as the performance from the main voice actors.

== Plot ==
In a popular online game called "The World", a player named Haseo searches for a Player Killer (PK) called Tri-Edge to save his friend, Shino, who was PKed and rendered comatose in real life as the result. One day, he encounters a girl named Atoli, who uses the same PC as Shino after a disagreement with Atoli's superior, Sakaki, regarding his PKK activities. Haseo meets his former guild master, Ovan, who informs Haseo that Tri-Edge will appear again at the place where Shino was PKed. Haseo fights the fighter but is defeated and loses all his PC's powers.

The defeated Haseo is taken by a group of CC Corp system administrators called G.U., which consists of its leader Yata, and his two subordinates Pi and Kuhn. They reveal that Haseo is one of special PCs known as the Epitaph Users that possesses special power to control a being known as Avatar. G.U. offers to help Haseo in finding Tri-Edge in exchange he joins G.U. and help to exterminate an unknown A.I bug called AIDA that causes multiple players to fall into a coma in real life. Wishing to help, Atoli approaches Haseo and starts to spend times with him, but Haseo later rejects her in rage. Ovan manipulates Atoli to look for Tri-Edge to gain Haseo's acceptance. Learning Atoli's disappearance caused by an AIDA phenomenon, Haseo pursues Atoli with Pi and Kuhn. When they found Atoli, Tri-Edge appears once more. Haseo awakens his Avatar, Skeith, and defeat his nemesis. Upon his defeat, however, Atoli is attacked by AIDA, causing her PC data to deteriorate. To save her, Haseo shares his PC data with Atoli. During the process, Ovan hacks into G.U., transporting Haseo and Atoli to an area. In Atoli's mind space, Haseo confronts the AIDA-infected Atoli, freeing her from its influence. When they regain consciousness, they are shocked to find Pi and Kuhn's PCs destroyed with a Tri-Edge sign left behind. Ovan appears, revealing an AIDA arm. Ovan PKed Atoli and admit to being the true Tri-Edge who killed Shino.

Shocked and angered by Ovan's betrayal, Haseo's rage transforms him, but is still not enough to surpass Ovan. Atoli helps him to remember his true reason for fighting, enhancing his PC again. As Haseo wins the fight, it is revealed that Ovan has unintentionally made his sister, Aina, comatose, after being infected by AIDA. To save her and eradicate all AIDA, Ovan successfully awakened his sister at the cost of himself, leaving Haseo grief-stricken. Atoli uses her Avatar's power to send Haseo to the sea of data to save Ovan. After the battle, Haseo meets Atoli at Hulle Granz Cathedral and is approached by Shino who has regained her consciousness. Realizing Haseo and Atoli's mutual feelings for one another, Shino gives them her blessing.

In the post-credit scene, Aina is playing on a field with Ovan happily. Meanwhile, Pi's player, Reiko Saeki, is contacted by an unknown man, reporting that the threat has been dealt with and a group known as Schicksal is on the move.

== Cast ==
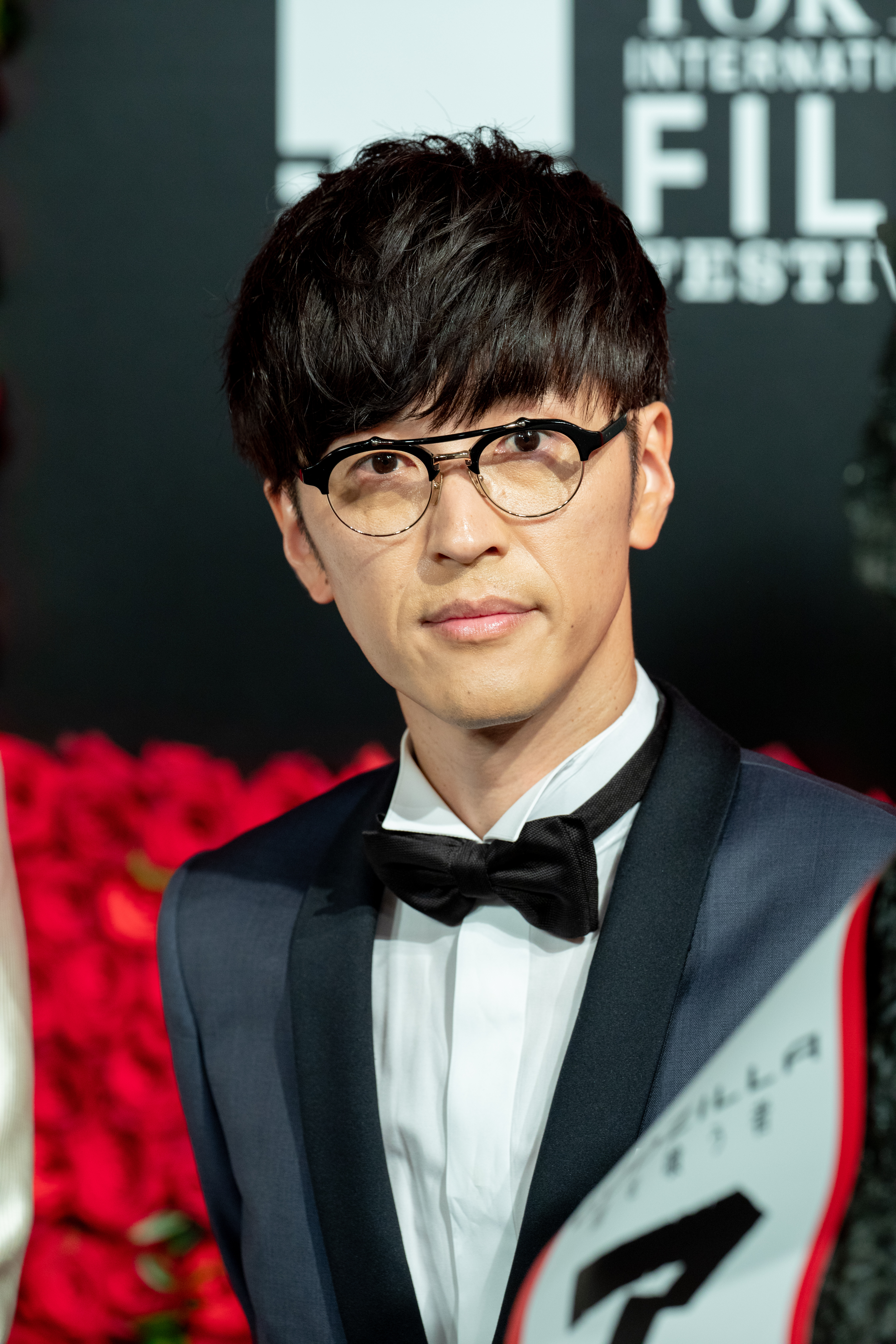
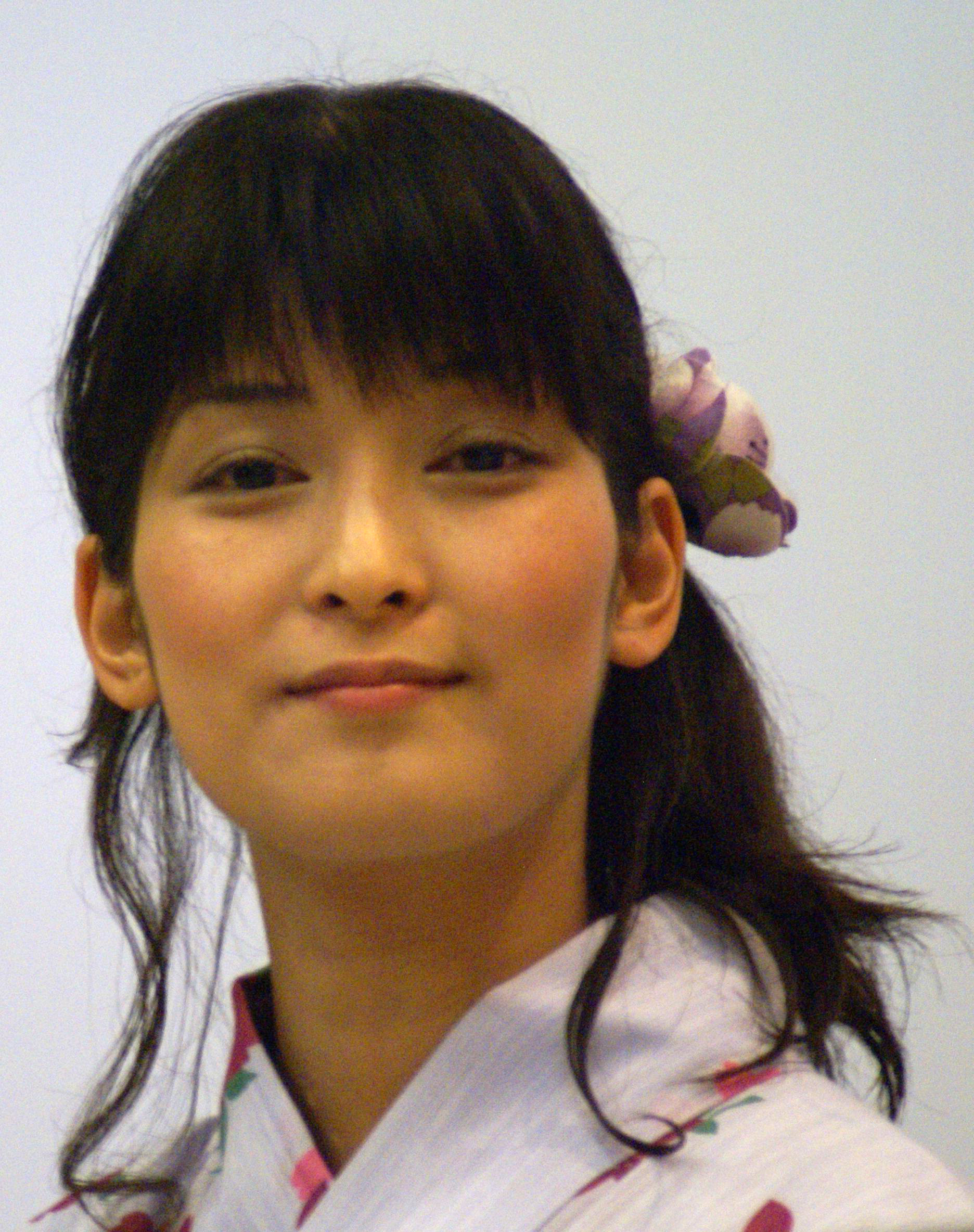
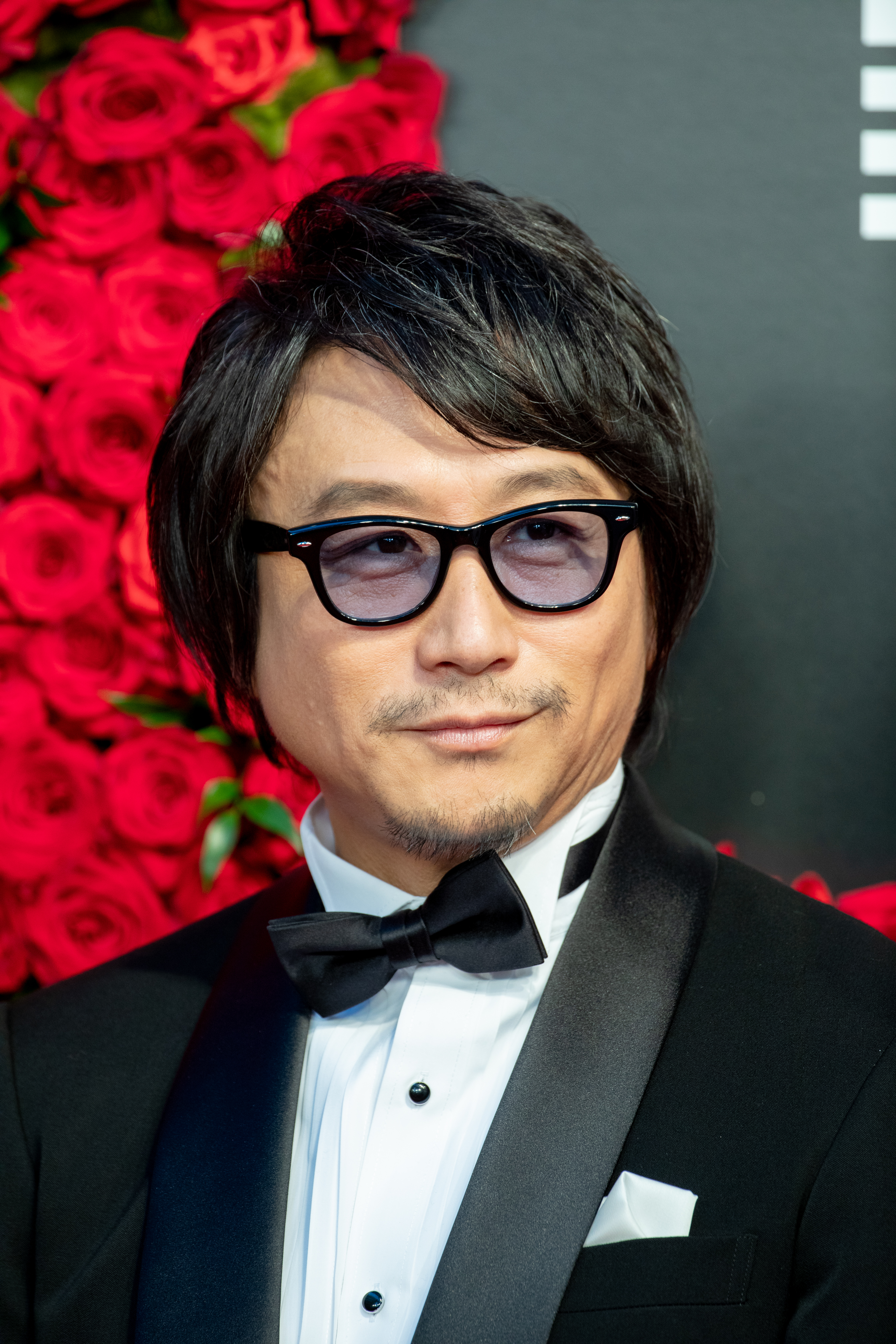
The Japanese voice cast from other Trilogy media reprise their roles, including Takahiro Sakurai (Haseo), Ayako Kawasumi (Atoli), and Hiroki Touchi (Ovan).

The cast follows:

- Takahiro Sakurai as Haseo
- Ayako Kawasumi as Atoli
- Hiroki Touchi as Ovan
- Kaori Nazuka as Shino
- Sanae Kobayashi as Pi
- Shinichiro Miki as Kuhn
- Takumi Yamazaki as Yata
- Akiko Hiramatsu as Bordeaux
- Atsuko Enomoto as Aina
- Katsuyuki Konishi as Sakaki
- Maaya Sakamoto as Aura
- Masumi Asano as Alkaid
- Sayaka Aida as Azure Kite
- Toshihiko Seki Genius (voice at the end)

== Production ==
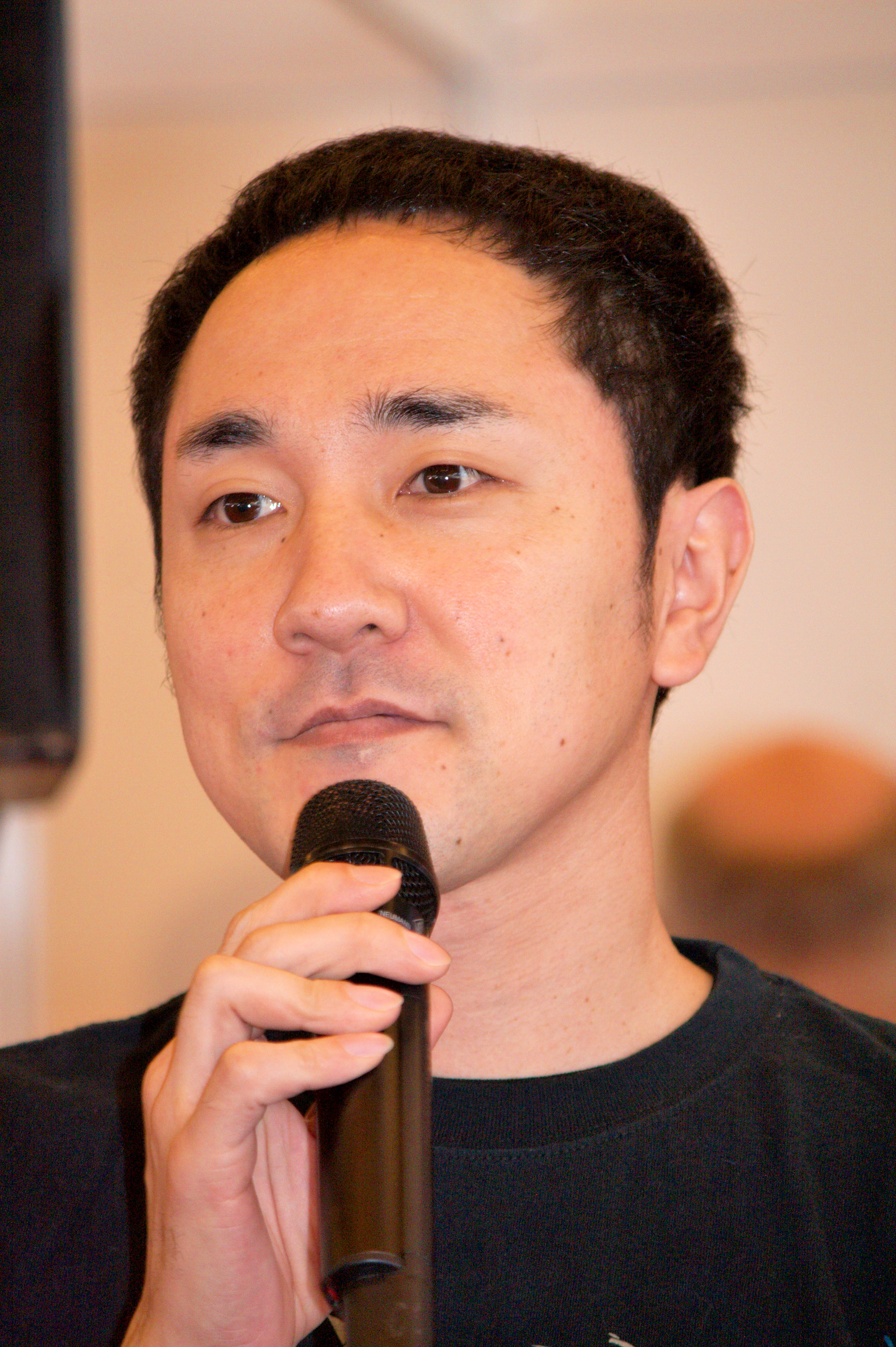
The OVA was directed by Hiroshi Matsuyama.

Hiroshi Matsuyama decided to create a film with CyberConnect2 ever since the making of the second .hack//G.U. game. By May 2006, Matsuyama read articles in regards to how people reacted to the first .hack/G.U. game impressed the animation. However, Matsuyama felt some were unable to play a 30-hour-long game based on comments of lacking the free time to the point fans wanted to watch a DVD with all the cutscenes in the game. Matsuyama related with many of these comments focused on lack of free time as well as difficulties with finishing lengthy games such as role-playing games. The team sought to combine all scenes from the trilogy in the OVA but only had 72 minutes. This proved difficult as there was no way the film would fit every scene. There were a total of 43 in the final product which were edited to fit the hardware of the PlayStation 3.

The company had already produced multiple games for the .hack and Naruto: Ultimate Ninja series. The company listened to feedback from their fans in regards to what elements from their series they had to improve in order to create a new product. Matsuyama was influenced by his desire to produce challenging visual graphics with the film. The narrative was meant to cover both the .hack//G.U. games and the prequel anime .hack//Roots. As a result, CyberConnect2 worked into giving Haseo's multiple facial expressions since his character underwent multiple changes of personality in the narrative. Although initially centered on Haseo, Matsuyama wanted to film to explore Atoli's character furthermore and how she is connected to Haseo's quest of revenge. Another character given more importance was Ovan in contrast to his previous incarnation. In regards to the 3D animation, Matsuyama used his experience in the Naruto games to provide new similar action scenes. CyberConnect2's idea was to take advantage of the HD graphics presented in .hack//G.U.. The animation was based on cel shading to produce colorful areas fitting for PlayStation 3 games.

Matsuyama wanted him to give the cast more realistic expressions, resulting in alterations to their design. He wanted the film to deeply focus on Haseo and Atoli's relationship. Additionally, with the film Matsuyama wanted to give Haseo another design as he felt retelling the story with the same abilities the character possessed would not attract returning fans. This was called "B-st Form" which occurs when Haseo loses his control when believing Atoli is killed. In trailers of the film, Haseo's B-st form was kept in secret to the point he joked they might be different characters. Matsuyama gave multiple directions to Sakurai for the Trilogy film, including how he should act in a scene like he was throwing up due to his large amount of yells Haseo has when achieving the B-st form. In contrast to the original games where Ovan becomes an ally to Haseo, the Trilogy OVA was written with the opposite result. Haseo's character arc in the movie comes in the form of how he is obsessed with violence during his struggles with Ovan and thus reaches his Xth Form when coming on terms with the flaws of his ways. Matsuyama felt this take on Haseo was well executed. The music was composed by Chikayo Fukuda while the theme "Deepest Memories" was performed by Tomoyo Mitani. "Deepest Memories" was thought by Matsuyama as an ideal romantic theme song that would play in the film ever since he thought about the making of Trilogy. The original tracks from the video games were rearranged to fit the format. Not satisfied with the complete OVA, Matsuyama decided to add a Parody Mode to the product in order to produce extra material for fans to have fun.

CyberConnect2 first announced the OVA it in Tokyo Game Show during September 2007. Its original soundtrack was released on March 26, 2008, featuring twenty-three tracks. Bandai Entertainment obtained rights to the film in August 2008. It was limitedly screened in Japan between December 2007 and January 2008. It was released on January 25, 2008, in home media format in Japan, while on August 18, 2009, in English regions by Bandai. It was rereleased in Blu-ray format in Japan on November 27, 2017. Crunchyroll obtained rights to stream the OVA in January 2018. The original soundtrack was released in Japan on March 26, 2008, as .hack//G.U. Trilogy O.S.T. and featured a total of twenty-three themes.

== Reception ==
Haseo facing Ovan in his B-st form which was first introduced in this film to surprise fans

Sales for the DVD and Blu-ray have been positive, based on charts in Japanese sites. Early impressions of the OVA were positive with Siliconera being surprised by the quality of the visuals.

Following the release of the movie in English regions, reviews were mixed negative comments focusing on Haseo's early portrayal, but his interactions with Atoli being praised. Carl Kimlinger from Anime News Network referred to Haseo's and Atoli's relationship as one of the best parts from the film .hack//G.U. Trilogy, pointing to the scene in which the former confronts the latter's AIDA-infected. He called Haseo an "unsympathetic bastard of a lead" though for his antisocial and aggressive manners. Jeuxact found Haseo as too unlikeable in the film in contrast to his more enjoyable persona from Roots. The Fandom Post had mixed thoughts about the narrative due to the idea of the film feeling rushed as a result of employing multiple characters not present from Roots but felt Haseo's interactions with Ovan and Atoli are the best points. Capsule Monsters regarded it as an "absolute mess" due to the narrative attempts to introduce multiple characters in little time but still felt the character arc Haseo has with Atoli to be one of the film's strongest points. The reviewer also regarded Atoli's character as one of the strongest ones in the film. Paul Jensen from Anime News Network was more negative, panning Haseo's characterization and, stating that while Atoli is likable, her relationship with Haseo was not well developed.

Journalists also commented on the film's visuals, which were mostly received well. While also having different thoughts in regards to the use of CGI animation, The Fandom Post found it enjoyable, fitting of an anime. Capsule Monsters praised the visuals for its action scenes, especially pointing Haseo's fast-paced fights. ANN highly praised the visuals for the action fights choreography as well as character's facial expressions. Jeuxact made similar comments in regards to the visuals, praising Hiroshi Matsuyama's direction as well as character designs. comparing it with the 2005 CGI film Final Fantasy VII: Advent Children but found Trilogy to lack the realism from Advent Children's visuals. Both Haseo and Atoli's actors, Takahiro Sakurai and Ayako Kawasumi, were highly praised for their work in the OVA. ANN enjoyed Kawasumi's vocal range of emotions to Atoli but had mixed thoughts about how Sakurai can make Haseo more likable despite his striking performance.
