= .hack//G.U.+ =

Japanese manga series

- Cover of the first volume of the series
- Genre: Fantasy, Science fiction
- Manga
- Written by: Tatsuya Hamazaki
- Illustrated by: Yusuke Morita
- Published by: Kadokawa Shoten
- English publisher: NA: Tokyopop (former); UK: Tokyopop(former)
- Volumes: 5
- Related works
- .hack//G.U. video games; ".hack//Roots", prequel of the series

.hack//G.U.+ is a shōnen manga written by Tetsuya Hamazaki and illustrated by Yuzuka Morita. Based on CyberConnect2's role-playing game trilogy .hack//G.U. for the PlayStation 2, the series follows an online gamer called Haseo who is on a quest of revenge to defeat the player killer Tri-Edge who sent his friend Shino into a coma in real life. The series was published in Kadokawa Shoten's magazine .hack//G.U. The World between 2006 and 2009 and collected in a total of five tankobon volumes. TokyoPop licensed the series to be published in North America starting in February 2008.

Despite being an adaptation of the video games, Hamazaki addressed multiple changes in freedom given to work in the manga. This include Haseo's darker characterization to reflect a teenager's angst as well as a new character named Kazumi who stars as an antagonist in the manga's second half.

Critical reception to the manga expressed mixed thoughts on Haseo due to his portrayal of an anti-hero despite having noble goals while the plot was praised for being easy to understand despite being part of a large media. Morita's artwork was the subject positive response based on the character designs and fight scenes.

== Plot ==
Set in 2017, .hack//G.U.+ chronicles the revenge quest of Haseo, a player from the online video game The World. Haseo is a player killer of player kills, defeating a group of them in the first chapter who were aiming to kill the young Atoli. Haseo seeks the pk Tri-Edge who used an unknown skill to send his friend Shino into a coma after defeating her in the game. With help from his former mentor, Ovan, Haseo learns of the current location of Tri-Edge, a cathedral. However, Tri-Edge, easily defeats Haseo, sending him into a coma for a short time where his PC is taken to the guild of the Serpent of Knowledge who have been investigating Tri-Edge actions as they work for The World's developers. When Haseo recovers, he learns that Azure Flame Kite is the true name of the Tri-Edge and that multiple people have been sent into a coma by Tri-Edge through a virus known as AIDA. Finding a chance to bring Shino back, Haseo joins G.U.

Once joining G.U. Haseo meets Khun who reveals that there are eight players called Epitaph Users who can use Kite's Data Drain skills provided by their Avatars in order to defeat the AIDA. Haseo and Shino are two of the eight Epitaph Users. Seeking to wake up his Avatar, Haseo is motivated by Ovan to face Endrance, a gamer famous in The World tournaments who possesses both AIDA and an Avatar. When facing Endrance, Haseo awakes his own Avatar, Skeith, and defeats Endrance, erasing his AIDA in the process. During his quest, Haseo, Khun and G.U.'s Pi face Azure Kite, but are unable to make him reveal information about the Lost Ones. After saving an AIDA infected Atoli, Ovan reveals himself to Haseo as the true Tri-Edge whose PC contains AIDA. Ovan had manipulated Haseo to awaken his Avatar and gather all other ones in order to unlock his own skill: The Rebirth. Following his defeat at the ends of Haseo's Skeith, the Rebirth restores all comatose players including Aina, his sister who was accidentally targeted by AIDA out of control, but this comes at the cost of Ovan's life in the real world. As Shino is revived, Haseo quits The World. Ryou Misaki, the player behind Haseo, meets a recovered Shino in real life and confesses his romantic feelings towards her. However, Shino rejects him as she explains she willingly let Ovan PKed her because she loves him, and her feeling still remain unchanging.

Some time after Ovan's death, Misaki returns to The World to meet Aina after she received a mail sent by her supposed dead brother. Their discussion interrupted by the new leader of G.U., Kazumi, who steals Skeith from Haseo, damaging his PC and mind in the process. Atoli's superior, Zelkova, saves Haseo by hacking his character. Kazumi seeks to eventually fulfills his ambition, becoming a "false god" of The World. Kazumi once again tries to kill the weakened Haseo but he is protected by Atoli who is revealed to have inherited Shino's Avatar it left the latter. Kazumi seeks his plans to become the new god of The World by absorbing a creature known as Cubia and becomes one with it. Upon being commanded by the goddess of The World, the Ultimate AI Aura, she guides G.U. to Cubia's location. Haseo's group reaches Cubia and use their Avatars together to take him down alongside the remains of Kazumi. During this battle, the remains of Ovan's PC are restored to The World by the AIDA still attached to his left arm, allowing Ovan to help Haseo in defeating Kazumi and Cubia. Following this, Ovan is reunited with his sister and reconciles with Haseo and Shino.

== Publication ==
Cover of the fourth volume which uses a new character, Kazumi, in the background while Haseo was redesigned in his Xth Form which artist Morita enjoyed drawing

The series was first announced in October 2005 to start in the first issue of .hack//G.U. The World magazine. The manga was written by Tetsuya Hamazaki who previously worked in the .hack//G.U. trilogy of games. Yuzuka Morita worked as the artist. In regards to Haseo's personality, Hamazaki claims that it was toned down for the games in order to make him more appealing. In contrast, Haseo is more aggressive in the printed adaptations (written by Hamasaki) where he often threatens enemies. Hamasaki states that Haseo's traits are his attempts at writing a PC controlled by an antisocial teenager. Morita considered herself inexperienced to be working for the manga but was thankful towards this experience. Morita noted the exclusive character Kazumi to be obsessive, something he also found in common with the Atoli's superior Zelkova. While in the original games Haseo has four forms, in the manga he only has the base form and the hacked Xth Form. The artist found the latter one interesting to draw to Haseo now wielding guns instead of swords.

Originally, the serialization of the manga was aimed to last until the third volume. However, by the time of its release, Hamazaki stated there was a change of plans and that the series would continue. The manga was serialized for four years and collected in a total of five of tankobon volumes. Hamazaki stated he aimed this manga to be read by teenagers but due to the length, some parts were changed.

The series was licensed by TokyoPop in June 2007 with the first volume scheduled to be released on February 12, 2008.

=== Chapter list ===
No.	Original release date	Original ISBN	English release date	English ISBN
1	June 22, 2006	9784047138292	February 12, 2008	1-4278-1381-7
01. "Tri-Edge"; 02. "Missing Person"; 03. "The Epitaph Users"; 04. "Endrance"
2	September 21, 2006	9784047138636	June 17, 2008	978-1-4278-0636-9
05. "Avatar, Awaken"; 06. "Serial Killings"; 07. "Logout Disabled"; 08. "Limits and Conflicts"
3	March 23, 2007	9784047139060	October 7, 2008	1-4278-0768-X
09. "Atoli's World"; 10. "Things Fall Apart"; 11. "Aina"; 12. "Holy Ground"
4	March 22, 2008	9784047150096	December 30, 2008	1-4278-1502-X
13. "Letter From the Dead"; 14. "Security Section 2"; 15. "Xth Form"; 16. "R.A. Plan"; 17. "Sample"; 18. "False God"
5	March 21, 2009	9784047152106	September 1, 2009	1-4278-1710-3
19. "Cubia"; 20. "Point of Origin"; 21. "The Shadowed One"; 22. "Foreboding"; 23. "Marching on the Brink"; 24. "The Visitor"; 25. "Anti-Existence"; 26. "Reunion"

== Reception ==
The series was well received by critics. Lesley Smith from Newtype wrote ".hack//G.U.+ is yet another outlet for the story to shine combining a compelling mythology with the manga format." Anime News Network found it appealing for newcomers as they did not find previous knowledge of the series to understand the story but complained about is overuse of cliches. Pop Culture News enjoyed the mystery provided by the mystery. Due to G.U.+ being a sequel to Roots, Manga News felt the readers might need to watch the anime to know the series' proper world building and cast. Haseo's take in the manga earned positive response due to his quest being compelling due to player killers being something no online gamer discourage according to IGN. Despite calling him a "ruthless fighter", Carlo Santos from Anime News Network commented that Haseo's wish to save Shino makes him an appealing character. Manga News felt that Haseo was more a more striking character in the manga than in other versions due to how his cold personality contrasts other shonen manga protagonists, leading to criticism of his change into a more traditional hero as the writer found that Haseo loses most of his charisma following Ovan's defeatand that his love triangle with Atoli and Shino was poorly handled. In a general overview of the manga, the website felt that the narrative is far darker than any previous installment in the .hack franchise due to Haseo's initial dark characterization involving his revenge towards Tri-Edge.

In regards to the cast, PopCultureShock found her Atoli among other characters from the supporting cast more likable due to how they contrast Haseo's cold personality, although Manga News criticized the handling of Atoli's love triangle with Haseo and Shino in the fourth volume, considering it a reboot of the manga. Ovan's revelation to be the true Tri-Edge helped to bring the anime Roots to a closure, something the anime left open for the game. Nevertheless, the reviewer felt Ovan's battle to feel rushed in the manga version. However, the finale was felt by Manga News to be too quick for the amount of revelations provided in the fight against Cubia. The writer found the new character Kazumi difficult to follow.

Morita's artwork was praised by IGN for being faithful to the original games while also throwing his take on this version. Anime News Network praised the artwork too, most notably Morita's action scenes which might draw more readers, while Pop Culture Shock found it "stylish and eye catching" due to the variety of character designs and weaponry despite finding issues with the fight scenes. Despite liking the art and fights, Manga News felt the pacing of some battles like Haseo's against Endrance was too fast to enjoy properly. Morita was also praised by Manga News for similar parts from his design of The World designs, making most of the cast be unique with the exception of Atoli and Shino who share nearly the exact same character design. As a result, the website found the artwork nearly flawless.

The series has been popular in North America, appearing in polls from ICv2 and the New York Times. In retrospective, Ben Leary from Mania Entertainment noted that while the game's novelization explores better Haseo than the manga, making for it to be a more interesting read. In a general overview of the franchise, Relive and Play noted that while .hack franchise might be difficult to follow, their manga adaptations are written in a fashion to be easier to understand with Alcor adding more depth to the supporting cast from G.U.+.
