= Chaser Game (manga) =

Japanese manga series

- First tankōbon volume cover

チェイサーゲーム
- Manga
- Written by: Hiroshi Matsuyama
- Illustrated by: Yukitaro Matsushima
- Published by: Enterbrain
- Magazine: Famitsu
- Original run: December 18, 2018 – present
- Volumes: 15
- Television drama

Chaser Game
- Directed by: Isamu Ota, Masayuki Yamaguchi, Katsuya Mitsuoka
- Written by: Atsushi Asada, Isamu Ota
- Studio: TV Tokyo, Dub Corporation
- Original network: TV Tokyo
- Original run: September 9, 2022 – October 28, 2022
- Episodes: 8

Chaser Game (チェイサーゲーム) is a Japanese manga series written by Hiroshi Matsuyama and illustrated by Yukitaro Matsushima. It began serialization online via Famitsu on December 18, 2018. The series draws from Matsuyama's own experience working at CyberConnect2 as the story follows its protagonist Tatsuya Shindo, a game designer who is promoted to a senior position at CyberConnect2, who learns to deal with his new responsibilities. In 2022 a live-action television drama adaptation of the series was produced by TV Tokyo.

In 2024 a spin-off television drama titled "Chaser Game W" was produced by TV Tokyo featuring an original story that centered around two lesbians working in the game industry.

== Media ==
=== Manga ===
Written by Hiroshi Matsuyama and illustrated by Matsushima Yukitaro, Chaser Game was released online via Famitsu from December 18, 2018, to November 1, 2021. The first seven volumes are considered the "first season", with volume eight containing a short manga that Matsuyama drew during the airing of the first season of the live-action adaptation. A "second season" of the manga began after this and is collected from volume nine onward. The series has been collected into fifteen tankōbon volumes.

No.	Release date	ISBN
1	September 13, 2019	9784047334267
2	September 13, 2019	9784047334274
3	February 7, 2020	9784047334649
4	July 6, 2020	9784047334847
5	November 30, 2020	9784047335189
6	June 28, 2021	9784047335530
7	January 18, 2022	9784047335776
8	January 30, 2024	9784047337121
9	January 30, 2024	9784047337138
10	April 23, 2024	9784047337282
11	September 26, 2024	9784047337503
12	March 1, 2025	9784047337503
13	August 21, 2025	9784047338012
14	February 4, 2026	9784047338388
15	July 29, 2026	9784040900414

=== Drama ===
A live-action television drama adaptation was announced in August, 2022. The series was produced by TV Tokyo and directed by Isamu Ohta, Masayuki Yamaguchi and Katsuya Mitsuoka, with Atsushi Asada and Isamu Ota writing the scripts. The series starred Keisuke Watanabe in the lead role. It premiered on TV Tokyo's Thursday Drama 24 slot from September 9, 2022, to October 28, 2022. The opening theme, Chaser Game, featured Maaya Uchida.
