= .hack//Link =

2010 video game

- Cover of the game
- Developer: CyberConnect2
- Publisher: Namco Bandai Games
- Composer: Chikayo Fukuda
- Series: .hack
- Platform: PlayStation Portable
- Release: March 4, 2010 (with bonus disc); March 28, 2010 (without bonus disc)
- Genre: Role-playing game
- Mode: single-player

.hack//Link is a single-player action role-playing game developed by CyberConnect2 for the PlayStation Portable. The game was released exclusively in Japan on March 4, 2010.

Set in a fictional version of the year 2020, .hack//Link's story takes place in a new version of "The World", a popular series of MMORPGs known as The World R:X. The game focuses on a young man named Tokio Kuryuu, a second year junior-high student who gets transported into The World R:X by a new student named Saika Amagi. After arriving into the game, Tokio is tasked by an artificial intelligence version of the character Kite to be a hero and use a tower of the Akashic Records to save the Twilight Knights, a group of artificial intelligence versions of characters based on casts of previous entries in the .hack series. Using the Akashic Records, Tokio is able to travel backwards in time to previous .hack entries and encounter past characters in order to unfreeze the data of the Twilight Knights.

Since its release, .hack//Link has been met with negative to mixed reception among both critics and fans alike. With many praising the expansion of the series' overall lore, but with strong criticism towards the gameplay of the title.

Although never stated to be the final chapter to the .hack series, the game is currently the last game in the chronology of the series to bear the name of .hack. The game was eventually followed with future installments known as Guilty Dragon: The Sin Dragon and the Eight Curses and New World Vol. 1: Maiden of Silver Tears for both iOS and Android platforms. Both games have since had their services discontinued.

== Plot ==
The story takes place in the year 2020. Tokio Kuryuu is a normal middle-school student who loves to play games. One day, a transfer student named Saika Amagi approaches Tokio and takes him to the school rooftop where she sends Tokio directly into The World R:X. There, he finds Kite, the legendary hero and leader of Twilight Knight dedicated to protect The World fighting against Flügel, the leader of a mysterious group called Schicksal. During their battle, Kite protected Tokio from Flügel's attack, resulting Kite's PC to be frozen but not before he asked Tokio to save them. Tokio is then transported to Saika's hideout, Grand Whale, and forcefully makes him her slave to find four items called Chrono Cores that are necessary to fully control the Akashic Record, a god-like power that holds over the system of The World and enables them to travel to the past data of The World. Using the Akashic Record, Tokio and Saika travels throughout the past timelines of .hack series to find the Chrono Cores and restored the frozen data of all members of Twilight Knights, gaining new allies in the process.

During their journey, Tokio befriends AIKA, a benevolent AIDA-PC that greatly resembles Saika whom the latter introduces as some sort of her alter ego. Saika also reveals that the reason she's gather Chrono Cores is because her cousin, Jyotaro Amagi, has sent her an email that tells her to save him by gathering all the Chrono Cores. One of Schicksal members, Geist, for some reason has been indirectly helping Tokio to get the Chrono Cores and at the same time getting rid of his own Schicksal comrades who were getting in Tokio's way. The mystery behind Tokio's ability to directly entering the game is revealed because he is a Doubleware, a special kind of human who has the ability to digitise himself into the network.

Near reaching the top of Akashic Record, Tokio are confronted by the five remaining members of Schicksal. However, two of the members, Metronome and Geist betrays Flügel, allowing Tokio and Saika to reach the core of Akashic Records where they find Aura trapped inside by Schicksal who reveals that they have been tricked. At this time, a virus suddenly came out from Tokio's body and slowly corrupting Aura. Geist reveals that he was the one who sent the email and the R:X disk to Saika by posing as Jyotaro so that he could corrupt Aura by using Tokio's power as a Doubleware combined with the virus that he implanted inside Tokio from the disk. Now working together with Flügel and the remaining members of Schicksal, Tokio confronts and defeats Geist who reveals that he was planning to bring forth Immortal Dusk, a plan to digitize all of humanity that was started by his creator, Jyotaro. Flügel then reveals that the plan was a failure, and Jyotaro had been the very first victim of the plan, resulting him to be in coma for years.

Aura, who was completely corrupted, begins her onslaught throughout the network and begins to digitise all humanity as a form of her twisted love for The World. Hoping to return Aura to normal, Tokio and all the revived Twilight Knights confront Aura and uses the vaccine programs that Saika had created to restore her. The vaccine is not enough to destroy the virus inside Aura, and one by one Tokio's friend was defeated. To save everyone, AIKA sacrifices herself to restore Aura's data and disappears. After the incident, Saika suddenly disappears, prompting Tokio to ask Flügel for help to locate her and finds her at a hospital where she is tending Jyotaro. Saika reveals her guilt for involving Tokio and blames herself for AIKA's death so she tries her best to just forget everything that happened and hopes for Tokio to do the same. Tokio refuses and convinces Saika that everything that happened is too meaningful and precious to be forgotten, telling her there's no need for her to bear the sadness alone. Tokio and Saika reaffirm their friendship, both determined to overcome their sadness over AIKA's death.

== Characters ==
=== Protagonist ===
Tokio Kuryuu (九竜 トキオ, Kuryū Tokio)
An avid gamer who never thinks about his future and cares only about games. Because he beats most games easily, he becomes excited about the release of "The World: R:X" and is disappointed to find he is unable to obtain it. When Saika Amagi suddenly invites him to the rooftop one day, she uses a mysterious black R:X disc (dated 2019.12.24, recorded by JxxxxAmagi) and transports Tokio into "The World". Tokio finds that he is both physically and mentally present in the game and is soon caught in a fight between Kite and Fluegel. For reasons unknown, Fluegel's weapon does not work on him.

Saika Amagi (天城 彩花, Amagi Saika)
A mysterious transfer student. She looks similar to the princess in Tokio's dreams. Pretty, good in studies and sports, she soon becomes very popular in school. One day, she invites Tokyo to the school rooftop and transports him into "The World", apparently having intended to do so all along. She later appears in "The World" and becomes imperious and demanding, ordering Tokio around as her slave. It is speculated that she has some relationship to Jyotaro Amagi, a key programmer behind the failed R.A. plan. Her name was originally transcribed as "Ayaka", but has since been changed to "Saika" (The kanji 彩 can be read as "Aya" or "Sai").

=== Antagonist ===
Fluegel (フリューゲル, Furyūgeru; German for "wing", sometimes used for "piano")
A mysterious male player character with long white hair and a right monocle. He holds a pistol called Brieler Rössle that is able to freeze the player character and encase them in ice/crystal (time control or possibly changing of the Akashic data). Kite was frozen but the pistol has no effect on Tokio. At the end of the battle against Kite, Fluegel was hit by Kite's Data Drain. He was saved from the attack and now has shorter black hair. Schicksal's leader.
Cello (チェロ, Chero)
A member of Shicksal with the appearance of a young winged girl. She saved Fluegel from Kite's Data Drain and later gathered the rest of the members.
Metronom (メトロノーム, Metoronōmu)
A bespectacled PC with an uptight and strict character. On returning to the hideout, Fluegel was lectured by Metronome on his reckless actions.
Orgel (オルゲル, Orugeru; German for "organ")
A male PC with a tough appearance. Almost got into a fight with Metronome after he commented on Metronome's uptight behavior.
Trommel (トロンメル, Toronmeru; German for "drum")
A muscular male PC with the appearance of a typical American comic hero. A level 120 PC who was after Tsukasa's Chrono Core. He was defeated by Tokio, but was left to live until Geist finished him off because of his nuisance.
Klarinette (クラリネッテ, Kurarinetto; German for "clarinet")
A silent female PC with an eyepatch covering her left eye. In real life, she previously encountered Tokio at a video game arcade and became the first person to break Tokio's perfect gaming record by thoroughly defeating him. For reasons unknown, she trains Tokio in The World R:X before revealing her allegiance to Schicksal.
Posaune (ポザオネ, Pozaone)
A PC with the appearance of a jester with a wide grin and an unstable personality. He encounters Tokio during his adventures through the .hack//SIGN timeline.
Geist (ガイスト, Gaisuto; German for "ghost" or "soul")
A male PC wearing a half mask, he holds a mysterious card. He suddenly appeared and killed Trommel just when Trommel was going to get Tokio. During the final stages of the game, it is revealed that he is a virus replica of Saika's cousin, Jyotaro Amagi, who was sent to virus Aura.
Jyotaro Amagi (天城丈太郎, Amagi Jyotaro)
A genius programmer formerly under the employment of CC Corp in the mid-2010s. He originally devised the Revive Aura Plan and was driven insane after the plan was sabotaged by Jun Bansyoya. Amagi is the creator of a program that would eventually become The World: RX that could be used to mentally insert a player directly into the game and help initiate the Immortal Dusk plan. Jyotaro Amagi is Saika Amagi's cousin and adoptive "brother".

== Manga adaptation ==
Cover art of the first .hack//LINK manga volume

Prior to the game's release, a shōnen manga adaptation was made titled .hack//LINK Twilight Knights (.hack//LINK 黄昏の騎士団, .hack//LINK Tasogare no Kishidan) and was released on October 26, 2007. It featured artwork done by Megane Kikuya and an entirely original story by CyberConnect2 that differs from the game. The manga was published by Kadokawa Shoten in Japan and released in the Kerokero Ace magazine. An English version of the manga was also published by Tokyopop.

After the release of the third volume on February 26, 2010, the manga adaptation of .hack//LINK was discontinued for unknown reasons.

=== Release ===
No.	Original release date	Original ISBN	English release date	English ISBN
1	March 26, 2009	978-4047152113	June 29, 2010	1-4278-1776-6
Access:1; Access:2; Access:3; Access:4; Access:5; Access:6; Pantsu:1
2	October 26, 2009	978-4047153035	November 2, 2010	1-4278-1868-1
Access:7; Access:8; Access:9; Access:10; Access:11; Access:12; Access:13
3	February 26, 2010	978-4047154070	February 8, 2011	1-4278-2582-3
Access:14; Access:15; Access:16; Access:17; Access:18; Access:19; Access:20

== Reception ==
Reaction to .hack//Link has been moderate to negative among both critics and fans alike. Famitsu magazine has commented that while Link's story is deep and engaging the gameplay itself is shallow and boring. The juggle combo feature in battles has been said to be fun on the first try but that over the course of the game many simply ignored it. The large cast has been praised by fans for the return of many classic characters, but many complain that some of the new X-forms are not required and that they ruin the flair. Heath Hindman, in RPGLand.com's review, shared many of these complaints in addition to ones regarding a "dreadful camera" and repetition "on a whole new level," among others. Hindman did have high praise for the story, however, saying, "It ties up many loose ends while adding a bit more info and detail to the world of The World. Moreover, it does so while managing to give a shout out to practically every major .hack side project and providing a great mix of fan service and real quality work". Ultimately, despite the story's strength, the .hack//Link's high number of game-breaking faults got it an overall rating of "Horrible."

== Spin-off material ==
In 2009 Namco Bandai Games announced at Tokyo Game Show that an all CG anime-series "tie-in" is going to be produced. Not many details were known other than it was not going to be a television series. They also announced that CyberConnect2's team "sai" is the production force for the CG film.

Later a 2D anime Original Video Animation series known as .hack//Quantum, produced by Kinma Citrus was announced with a subsequent 3DCGI movie known as .hack//The Movie being produced by CyberConnect 2 Sai.
