= Hiroshi Matsuyama =

Japanese game designer

- 松山洋
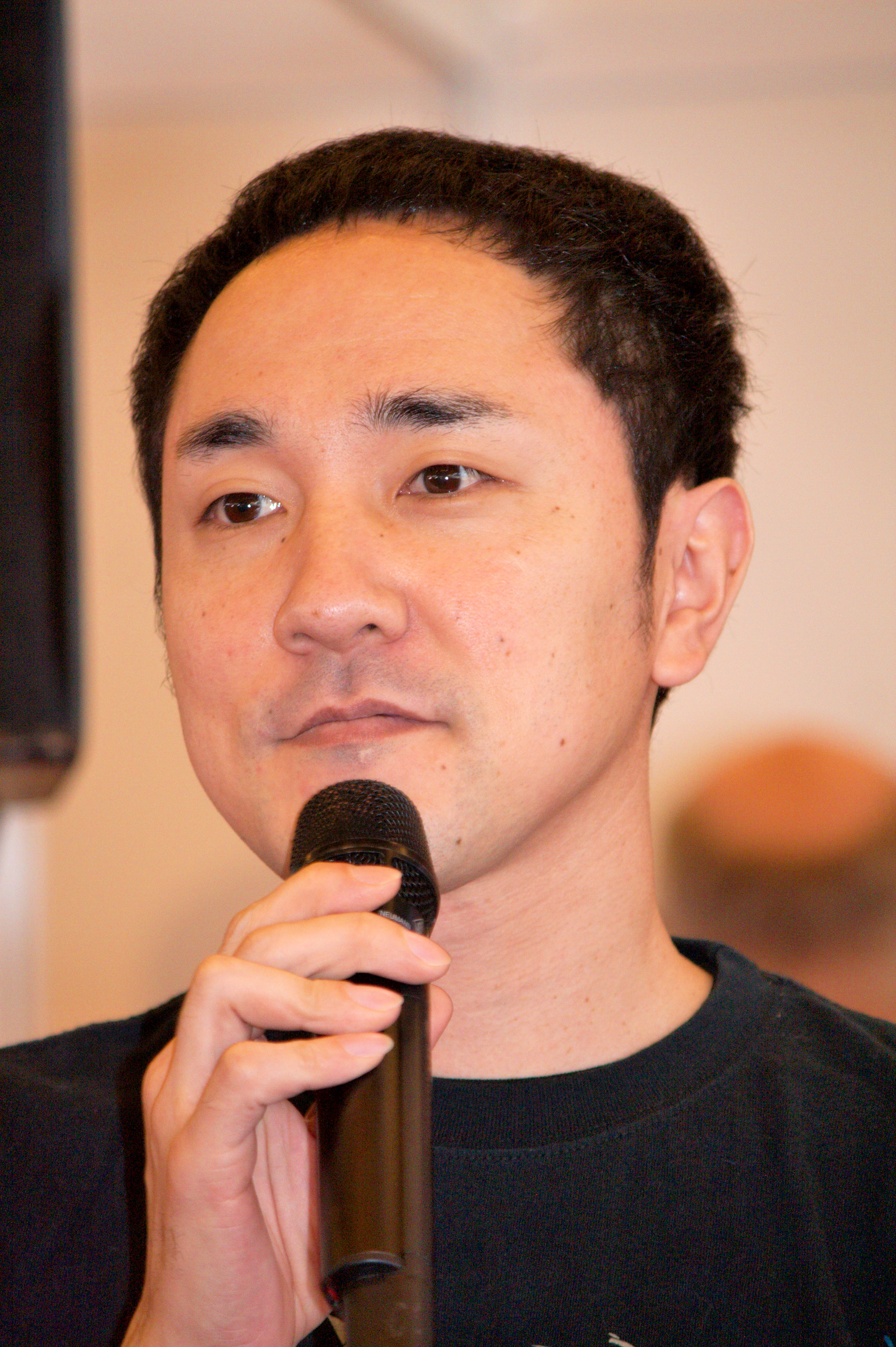
- Matsuyama in 2008
- Born: November 23, 1970 (age 55); Fukuoka Prefecture, Japan
- Education: Kyushu Sangyo University
- Occupations: Game designer, producer, programmer
- Employer: CyberConnect2
- Notable work: .hack series

Hiroshi Matsuyama (Japanese: 松山洋), born in November 23, 1970 in Fukuoka, is a Japanese game designer. He is the CEO of the company CyberConnect2. He developed multiple games including the .hack franchise as well as adaptations of the anime series including Naruto and Dragon Ball. Besides developing games, Matsuyama has participated in directing two .hack films as well as voicing a character from the series.

== Early life ==
As a child, Matsuyama was interested in anime and manga. He dreamed of becoming a mangaka for the Weekly Shonen Jump magazine. When growing up, he graduated from a university in Fukuoka. Following his graduation, Matsuyama joined a manga club. He went to Kyushu Sangyo University but had not decided what would be his job. Believing he was naive, Matsuyama became an employee for a cement company. He later joined a friend who was working for Taito in Tokyo. Around this time, Matsuyama decided to work for a game company. They gathered in Fukuoka, and started the company called CyberConnect. By the time he became a developer, the manga Naruto was his favorite series but he stated that other series including Bleach, Beelzebub, and One Piece were among second best.

== Career ==
He gathered with designers of action games from Taito including Psychic Force and RayStorm. Despite being originally an illustrator, Matsuyama became a game designer. CyberConnect, now composed of ten people, worked on Tail Concerto and Silent Bomber which brought him difficulties due to time demand. The team was disappointed with the low sales of these two games. In 2000 the CEO of CyberConnect left the team. This led to the company changing their name to CyberConnect2. Still composed of ten people, the company ought to create a new video game that would not be demanding within the company. Matsuyama commented on their audience, stating that the players will not look after the amount of designers behind a game, but instead the content produced.

=== .hack ===
Matsuyama played a key role in developing the concept for the .hack series. A number of core ideas, including "slaying dragons or being a thief in London" were explored, but these were rejected in favor of an "offline/online game". Matsuyama said that this would give young gamers an opportunity to experience online play without paying monthly fees or needing powerful Internet connections. The developers looked at a number of massively multiplayer online role-playing games such as Phantasy Star Online, Ultima Online, and Final Fantasy XI for inspiration, and drew influences from the prior works of character designer Yoshiyuki Sadamoto (Neon Genesis Evangelion) and scenario writer Kazunori Itō (Ghost in the Shell). Itō noted that casting the player into the role of a subscriber of The World creates a unique story-telling situation which draws the player deeper into the plot. Matsuyama theorized that the act of transferring saved data across the four volumes would help to create a sense of the human drama embodied by the games' story and invest the player into the narrative.

Development for .hack//G.U. began in October 2002, with Hiroshi Matsuyama as director. As in the previous games, Matsuyama also appears as a character that the player meets, this time being Piros the 3rd. Matsuyama claimed that Rebirth was longer than the four games of the first series combined and that the three .hack//G.U. games would not be "three parts to the same game". Matsuyama considered Kite as a relatable character and thus wanted the next game to feature a different take of lead character for .hack//G.U., Haseo. While .hack and .hack//Sign were conceived as two ongoing and connected projects, Matsuyama wanted to do the same with .hack//GU. However, Matsuyama wanted both .hack//G.U. and .hack//Roots to feature the same lead character, Haseo. However, he found it might come across as challenging to make the writing make both stay true to the original writing. The director also designed the character's hair to make it come across as an immature high school student. When doing this, Matsuyama conceived the idea of the Haseo's Xth form from the third game of the series that would affect not only his PC's body armor but also his hair to come across as a subtle change in his growth. Still finding difficulties in writing this, Matsuyama received help through writer Tatsuya Hamasaki who wrote the part of the series' script.

For the CGI movie, .hack//G.U. Trilogy, Matsuyama wanted him to be given more realisitic expressions, resulting in alterations to his design. Matsuyama wanted the film to deeply focus on Haseo and Atoli's relationship. Additionally, with the film Matsuyama wanted to give Haseo another design as he felt retelling the story with the same abilities the character possessed would not attract returning fans. This was called "B-st Form" which occurs when Haseo loses his control when believing Atoli is killed. In trailers of the film, Haseo's B-st form was kept in secret to the point he joked they might be different characters. He also directed the 2012 film .hack//The Movie.

=== Naruto: Ultimate Ninja series ===
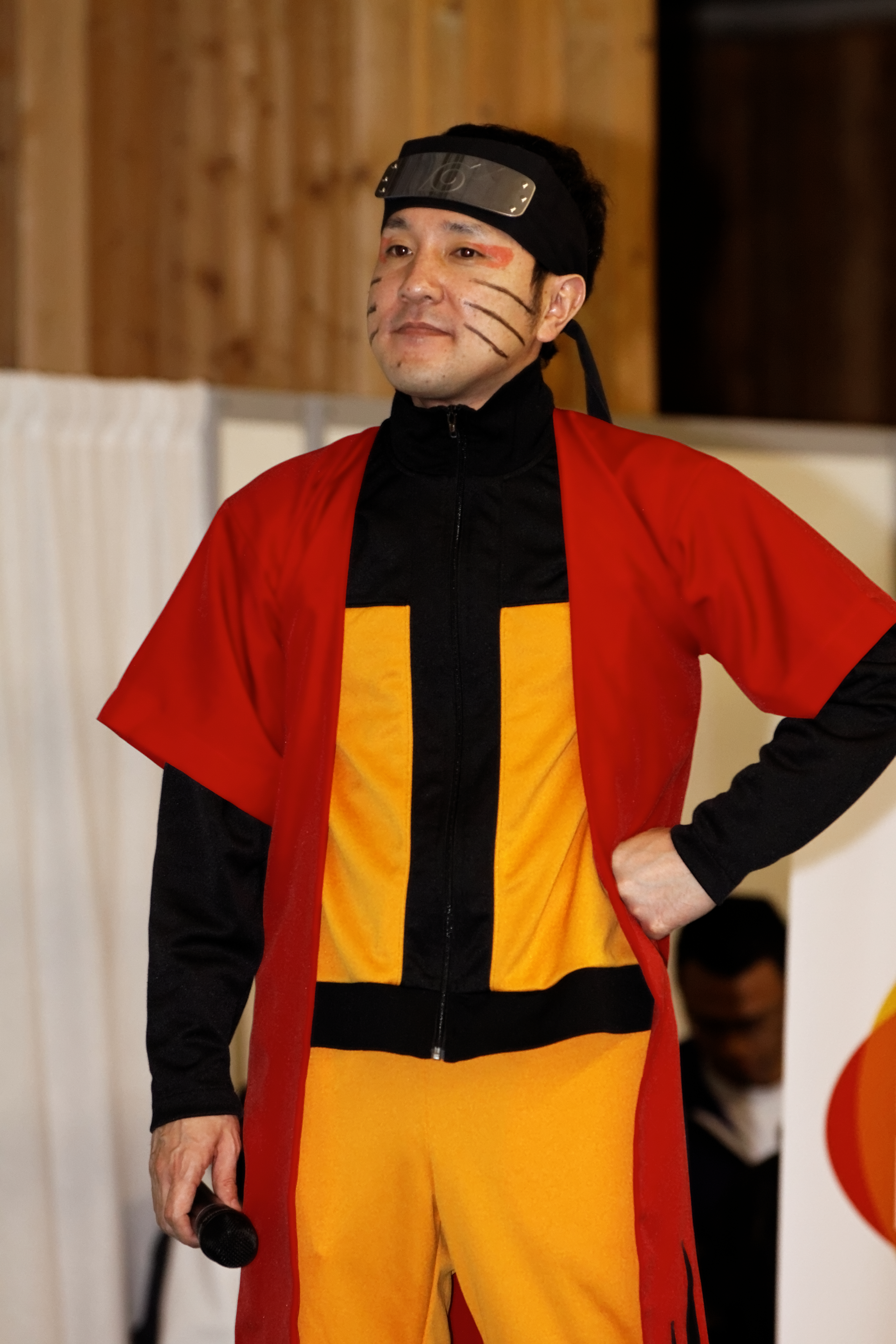
In order to promote games from the Naruto, Matsuyama cosplayed as Naruto Uzumaki in the 2012 Paris Marathon.

Hiroshi Matsuyama, one of the creators of the game Naruto: Ultimate Ninja Storm, commented that the staff wanted to try to remove the borderline between the anime and actual gameplay. They wanted to reach an effect where people actually look at the scenes as anime rather than a game. The core concept of the game is that of a one on one battle. Though the storyline from the game is based on the first 135 episodes of the anime series, the producers picked out key areas within the story, effectively forming a line from the first to the 135th episode.

Matsuyama said that one of the most important battles he wanted to create in the sequel was the fight between Sasuke Uchiha and his brother, Itachi. Itachi was Matsuyama's favorite character and he felt emotional while developing the fight. Besides including the cast of Naruto in their older forms, the game features Lars Alexandersson from the Tekken fighting series. His design attracted Matsuyama who asked the Tekken staff if he could include Lars. Members from both the Naruto and Tekken games'staff were surprised by how well he fitted in with the cast. Although Lars does not have a story in the game, Matsuyama expected gamers to enjoy playing as him in regular battles and online gameplay. Matsuyama refrained from including downloadable content in the game. Because some young gamers were unable to play Storm 2 due to the price of consoles, a spin-off game, Naruto Shippuden: Ultimate Ninja Impact, was released on the handheld PlayStation Portable console so that it would be more accessible.

Matsuyama also said that Naruto's Rasenshuriken was his favorite technique in the entire series due to its sounds as well as how the character executes it. Matsuyama also participated in the 2012 Paris Marathon while cosplaying as Naruto to celebrating the release of a new video game.

For the spin-off Naruto Shippuden: Ultimate Ninja Storm Revolution Masashi Kishimoto was the man responsible for new character "Mecha-Naruto" upon being suggested by the staff to include a new character. Kishimoto decided on adding a character that would bring a big impact to worldwide level which resulted in Mecha-Naruto. Matsuyama was surprised when seeing the new character. Naruto Shippuden: Ultimate Ninja Storm 4 was developed for next generation consoles as a result of demand in video game marketing. Matsuyama gathered multiple members from the video game Revolution finding them suitable for developing Storm 4. Due to the departure from the previous generation of consoles, Matsuyama aimed to create a highly appealing Naruto game as he claims he is a big fan of the manga himself and wanted to give it a proper ending in video game form. In retrospective, Matsuyama reclaims having been surprised by reading the manga's final volume which inspired him to do the game. Upon seeing the final product, Matsuyama felt emotional over seeing the final fight between Naruto and Sasuke. Matsuyama also made his own sketch of two fighters, aiming to put them the video game, promising gamers they would enjoy the emotions delivered by the fight.

=== Asura's Wrath ===
Asura's Wrath was an action game CyberConnect2 developed with Capcom which was influenced by multiple anime series like Dragon Ball and Naruto.

=== Final Fantasy VII: G-Bike ===
The idea to create a mobile game based on Final Fantasy VII came from Square Enix producer Ichiro Hazama. Square Enix designated Hiroshi Matsuyama of CyberConnect2 as the game's director with oversight by Square Enix executive producer Yoshinori Kitase. Matsumaya described the early submission and evaluation processes with Square Enix's newly-established game screening department as "bumpy". In an aside during an interview, Matsuyama revealed that he asked Square Enix producer Shinji Hashimoto if he was interested in a Final Fantasy VII remake, but Hashimoto was not. Matsuyama interjected, "Well, if G-Bike is released and becomes a hit, let's make a Final Fantasy VII [remake]".

=== Chaser Game ===
In December 2018, Matsuyama began writing a manga series, Chaser Game, that drew from his own experiences working at CyberConnect2. The series is illustrated by Matsushima Yukitaro and is serialized online via Famitsu. It has revised two live-action drama adaptations.

=== Dragon Ball Z: Kakarot ===
Dragon Ball Z: Kakarot was supervised by Matsuyama who aimed to develop more anime based games following its release.

== Commentary ==
Matsuyama claims that "Within the video game industry there are four things that are necessary: there is planning, there is graphics, there's sound, and then programming. These four things become the cornerstones of a video game." Matsuyama expressed difficulties in featuring characters' deaths. He notes that while Harold from .hack is dead during the narrative, the one portrayed in the game is an A.I. whose original version was never seen. Similarly, the cast from .hack and .hack//G.U. do not die during the games but instead fall into comas when infected with a virus. However, with the release of the licensed game Naruto Shippuden: Ultimate Ninja Storm 2, Matsuyama found himself forced to write a death for the first time in his career since it was already executed in the manga version of Naruto. In this game, the character of Jiraiya dies in combat and the designer felt himself with the obligation of making it impressive towards the gamers and show a major impact despite being fiction. Matsuyama further reflected the anime's 133rd episode of Naruto to be one of his favorites not only for the action sequences between Naruto Uzumaki and Sasuke Uchiha but also the emotional value displayed.

Matsuyama has also talked about other games. He stated he would like to develop Mega Man Legends 3 as he was disappointed in the game's cancellation. He also criticized Sega that stop marketing their products if a person connected with their work is arrested as it happened in the first release of Judgment due to Pierre Taki being arrested in late 2018.
