= .hack//The Movie =

- Japanese Theatrical release poster
- Directed by: Hiroshi Matsuyama
- Written by: Kazunori Ito
- Produced by: Ryo Mito; Rio Nakata
- Starring: Saki Fujita; Yukari Fukui; Nobuyuki Hiyama; Marina Inoue
- Cinematography: Shiho Kihara
- Edited by: Rie Koga
- Music by: Chikayo Fukuda
- Production companies: CyberConnect2 sai Anima
- Distributed by: Asmik Ace
- Release date: January 21, 2012 (Japan)
- Running time: 112 minutes
- Country: Japan
- Language: Japanese
- Box office: 55 M ¥

.hack//The Movie (Japanese: ドットハック セカイの向こうに, Hepburn: Dotto Hakku Sekai no Mukō ni; lit. .hack//Beyond The World) is a 2011 Japanese CGI anime film written by Kazunori Ito and directed by Hiroshi Matsuyama. It was released on January 21, 2012 in theaters and was released on DVD/Blu-ray on June 28, 2012. The Blu-ray release is a "hybrid" PlayStation 3 disc that includes the film and a fighting game called .hack//Versus.

The movie features a theme song "Hikari wo Atsumete" (Gathering Light) by Japanese music artist KOKIA.

== Plot ==
The story, taking place in 2024, follows the life of Sora Yuki, a 14-year-old girl persuaded by her friends to play the popular game called "The World". Due to an incident in The World, anomalies start occurring in the real world.

== Cast ==
- Saki Fujita as Makoto
- Yukari Fukui as Kaho Hasebe/Masaru Seven
- Nobuyuki Hiyama as Balder
- Marina Inoue as Chieko Tokura/Dasha
- Masako Katsuki as Yuka Kamachi/K-Kei
- Nanami Sakuraba as Yūki Sora
- Kei Tanaka as Tomohiko Okano
- Tori Matsuzaka as Kakeru Tanaka
- Kenichi Ogata as Takefu Yuuki/Take!
- Yasunori Masutani as Gondo
- Megumi Toyoguchi as Hiyori Yuuki

== .hack//Versus ==
.hack//Versus is a fighting game included on the Blu-ray release of .hack//The Movie. The game features characters from throughout the series, including Haseo, Sora, Tsukasa, Ovan, Sakuya, Tokio, Kite, and BlackRose.

=== Reception ===
PlayStation LifeStyle's review of the game and movie combo disc noted that the game was "not created to provide a rival to Mortal Kombat or Soul Calibur. This "fighting game" is largely another means of telling the larger .hack story," and went on to say, "As long as you're looking at it as something that probably wouldn't have existed as anything other than a throw-in with a movie purchase, you'll be fine. Enjoy the characters, the world, and the story. That's what you came to .hack for anyway, right?"
