= Mira (given name) =

- Pronunciation: /ˈmɪərə/; MEER-ə
- Gender: Female

Origin
- Origin: Arabic, Albanian, Hebrew, Latin, Sanskrit, Slavic, Korean, Finnish, Japanese, Turkish
- Meaning: "peaceful", "wonderful", "good", "kind", "ocean", "sea", "limit"

Other names
- Related names: Miranda, Myra, Meera, Miriam, Mila, Mika

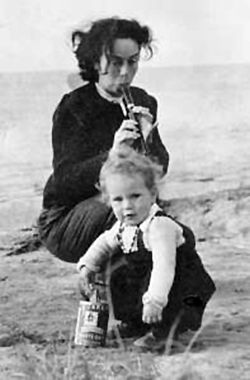
Mira Lobe, an Austrian children's author in 1945

Mira is a feminine given name with varying meanings. In the Romance languages, it is related to the Latin word ''mirus'' for 'wonder' and 'wonderful'. In Slavic languages, it means 'peace' and is often used as part of a longer name, such as Miroslava (masculine form: Miroslav), Mirjana, or Sławomira (masculine form: Sławomir). In Albanian, it means 'goodness' or 'kindness'. In Sanskrit, it means 'ocean', 'sea', 'limit', or 'boundary'. It is sometimes also a short form of other given names like the Arabic name Amira.

== Persons with Mira as a given name ==
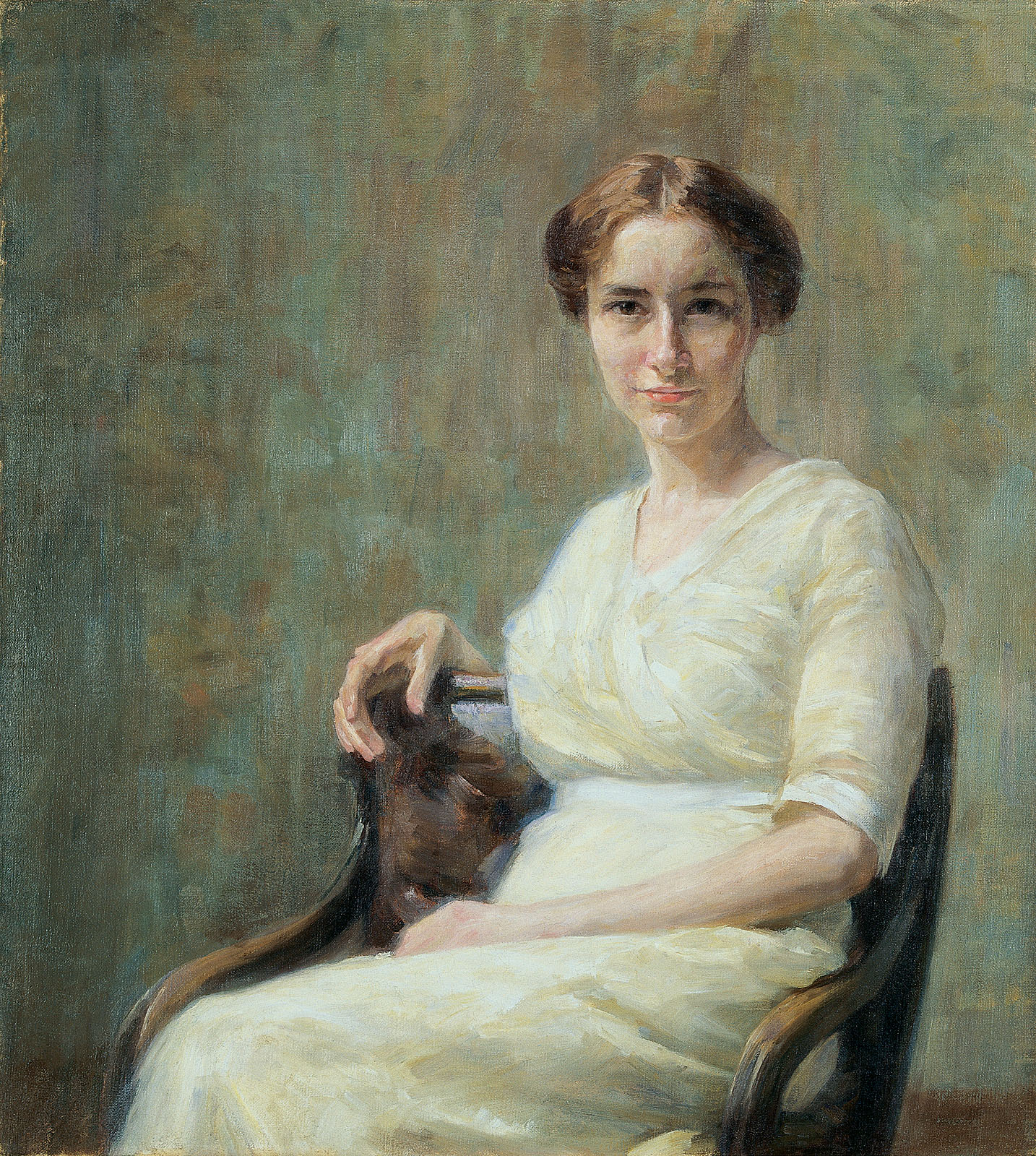
- Portrait of artist and art collector Mira Pintar, painted in 1913 by her aunt Ivana Kobilca.
  Mira Adanja Polak (born 1942), Serbian journalist
- Mira Aggarwal (born 1961), Indian politician
- Mira Alečković (1924–2008), Serbian and Yugoslav poet
- Mira Antonitsch (born 1998), Austrian tennis player
- Mira Ariel, Israeli linguist
- Mira Aroyo (born 1977), Bulgarian musician
- Mira Ashby (1922–2005), Canadian physician
- Mira Awad (born 1975), Palestinian-Arab actress and musician
- Mira Bai or Meera (1498–1547), Hindu mystical singer and poet
- Mira Margaret Baird Vance (1802–1878), American slave owner and farmer
- Mirjana Mira Banjac (born 1929), Serbian actress
- Mira Bartók (born 1959), American author
- Mira Bellwether (1982–2022), author of the 'zine Fucking Trans Women
- Mira Benjamin, Canadian musician
- Mira Bimperling (born 1994), German rhythmic gymnast
- Mira Bjedov (born 1955), Yugoslav basketball player
- Mira Boumejmajen (born 1995), French artistic gymnast
- Mira Bryunina (born 1951), Russian rower
- Mira Burt-Wintonick (born 1984), Canadian filmmaker
- Mira Calix (1969–2022), British-based artist
- Mira Cirul, Latvian dancer
- Mira Craig (born 1982), Norwegian rhythm and blues singer and songwriter
- Mira Dancy (born 1979), American painter
- Mira Das (born 1941), Indian politician
- Mira Datta Gupta (1907–1983), Indian politician
- Mira Marko Debelak Deržaj (1904–1948), Slovenian mountaineer, translator and opinion journalist
- Mira Dobreva (born 1972), Bulgarian television personality
- Mira Lloyd Dock (1853–1945), American botanist
- Mira Doig, British chemist
- Mira Edgerly-Korzybska (1872–1954), American portrait painter
- Mira Eklund (born 1981), Swedish actress
- Mira El Dannawi, Australian politician
- Míra Emberovics (born 1988), Hungarian handball player
- Mira Falardeau (born 1948), French Canadian historian, professor and author of comic strips
- Mira Filzah (born 1993), Malaysian actress, lawyer, model and businesswoman
- Mira Fornay (born 1977), Slovak film director
- Mira Fuchrer (c. 1920–1943), Polish resistance fighter
- Mira Furlan (1955–2021), Croatian actress and singer
- Mira Ghniem (born 1983), Jordanian swimmer
- Mira Gojak (born 1963), Australian artist
- Mira Golub (born 1975), Russian alpine skier
- Mira Golubović (born 1976), Serbian retired volleyball player
- Mira Gonzalez (born 1992), American poet
- Mira Hinsdale Hall (1863–1937), American school founder
- Mira Hallin (born 2006), Swedish ice hockey player
- Mira Hashmi (born 1976), Pakistani actress
- Mira Hoteit (born 2000), Lebanese footballer
- Mira Huhta (born 1987), Finnish ice hockey player
- Mira Jacob (born 1973), American writer
- Mira Jalosuo (born 1989), Finnish ice hockey player and coach
- Mira Jangaracheva (born 1952), Kyrgyzstani politician
- Mira Jungåker (born 2005), Swedish ice hockey player
- Mira Kaddoura (born 1977), Lebanese-Canadian conceptual artist
- Mira Kaskinen (born 1991), Finnish ski orienteering competitor
- Mira Kasslin (born 1978), Finnish cyclist
- Mira Klobučar (1888–1956), Croatian painter
- Mira Konçi (born 1973), Albanian singer and songwriter
- Mira Kremer (1905–1987), German chess player
- Mira Kubasińska (1944–2005), Polish blues rock singer
- Mira Kuisma (born 1987), Finnish ice hockey goaltender and coach
- Mira Kunnasluoto (born 1974), Finnish singer
- Mira Kuś (born 1958), Polish poet and journalist
- Mira Larionova, Russian para swimmer
- Mira Verås Larsen (born 1987), Norwegian canoe sprinter
- Mira Lehr (1934–2023), American multimedia artist
- Mira Lesmana (born 1964), Indonesian songwriter, film director and producer
- Mira Leung (born 1989), Canadian retired figure skater
- Mira Lobe (1913–1995), Austrian writer
- Mira Louen (born 1985), German canoeist
- Mira Luoti (born 1978), Finnish singer
- Mira Jeanne Maack (born 2004), German Paralympic swimmer
- Mira Magen (born 1950), Israeli author
- Mira Markström (born 2005), Swedish ice hockey player
- Mira McKinney (1892–1978), American actress
- Mira Mehta, Iyengar yoga teacher
- Mira Mendelson (1915–1968), Soviet writer
- Mira Mezini (born 1966), German computer scientist
- Mira Mihelič (1912–1985), Slovene writer and translator
- Mira Murati (born 1988), CTO of OpenAI
- Mira Nadon, American ballet dancer
- Mira Nair (born 1957), Indian-American film director
- Mira Nakashima (born 1942), Japanese-American architect and furniture maker
- Mira Oberholzer-Gincburg (1887–1949), Swiss psychiatrist and psychoanalyst
- Mira Petrović (born 1956), Serbian politician
- Mira Pintar (1891–1980), Slovenian bank clerk, artist, and art collector
- Mira Potkonen (born 1980), Finnish boxer
- Mira Ptacin, American author
- Mira Rai (born 1988), Nepalese trail runner and sky runner
- Mira Rapp-Hooper (born 1984), American political scientist
- Mira Renge, Indian politician
- Mira Ricardel (born 1960), American businesswoman and politician
- Mira Robertson, Australian writer and script editor
- Mira Rostova (1909–2009), American actress
- Mira Sasson (born 1965), Israeli artist
- Mira Schendel (1919–1988), Brazilian painter
- Mira Schor (born 1950), American artist, writer, editor and educator
- Mira Seth, Indian women's rights activist
- Mira Sethi (born 1987), Pakistani actress and writer
- Mira Shaib (born 1993), Lebanese director
- Mira Shelub (1922–2024), Polish Jewish resistance fighter
- Mira Škorić (born 1970), Serbian singer
- Mira Sorvino (born 1967), American actress
- Mira J. Spektor (1928–2021), American poet
- Mira Spivak (born 1934), Canadian politician
- Mira Stupica (1923–2016), Serbian actress
- Mira Suhonen (born 1985), Finnish sport shooter
- Mira Sulpizi (born 1923), Italian composer
- Mira Szászy (1921–2001), New Zealand Māori leader and academic
- Mira Todorova (born 1994), Bulgarian volleyball player
- Mira Topić (born 1983), Croatian volleyball player
- Mira W. (Widjaja) (born 1951), Indonesian author
- Mira Wanting (1978–2012), Danish actress
- Mira Wilkins, American historian
- Mira Zakai (1942–2019), Israeli contralto opera singer
- Mira Żelechower-Aleksiun (born 1941), Polish painter
- Mira Zimińska (1901–1997), Polish actress
- Mira Zore-Armanda (1930–2012), Croatian oceanographer
- Mira (born 1992), Hong Kong YouTuber

== Fictional characters ==
=== Mononymous ===
- Mira, a character from Animal Crossing: New Leaf
- Mira (Centuria), fictional pregnant slave in the Japanese web comic Centuria
- Ambassador Mira, a character in the Pixar film, Elio
- Mira (Encantadia), a character in the video game Encantadia
- Mira is the name of a non-playable character from the game Just Cause 4
- Mira, a character in the Netflix movie KPop Demon Hunters
- Mira, title character of the Disney Junior animated series Mira, Royal Detective
- Mira (ミラ), a character from She Professed Herself Pupil of the Wise Man
- Mira, a Shiba-Inu dog from a secret ending of the video game Silent Hill 2
- Mira (Star Wars), a character in Star Wars: Knights of the Old Republic II: The Sith Lords
- Mira, a character in The Last Legion
- Mira is a character from Tom Clancy's Rainbow Six Siege
- Mira, a character from the video game Zero Time Dilemma

=== With surname ===
- Mira Ackerman (ミラ・アッカーマン), a character from the anime Godannar
- Mira Dianus Artemina (ミラ・ディアノス・アルテミーナ), a character from the manga series Magi: The Labyrinth of Magic
- Mira Clearwater, a character from the Canadian series Big Blue (TV series)
- Mira Cruz / Mira C. Cordero, a character from Huwag Kang Mangamba
- Mira Hanayashiki (花屋敷 ミラ), a character from the anime Sekkō Boys
- Mira Kano, a character from the manga and Netflix series Alice in Borderland
- Mira Konohata (木ノ幡 みら), a character from the manga series Koisuru Asteroid
- Mira Nova, a character from Buzz Lightyear of Star Command: The Adventure Begins and Buzz Lightyear of Star Command
- Mira Troy, a character in the 2022 film, Enola Holmes 2
- Mira Yamana (山奈 ミラ), a character from Trinity Seven
- Mira Yurizaki (百合崎 ミラ), a character from the manga series Dimension W

== See also ==
- Mira (mythology)
- Mirah (born 1974), American musician
- Mir (title)
- Mira
- Daihatsu Mira
- MIRA Ltd.
