= Armanda =

Armanda is a surname. Notable people with the surname include:

- Mira Zore-Armanda (1930–2012), Croatian oceanographer
- Maria Armanda (born 1976), Portuguese child singing sensation
