= Nüsken =

Nüsken is a German surname. Notable people with the surname include:

- Gertrud Nüsken (1917–1972), German chess master
- Sjoeke Nüsken (born 2001), German footballer
