= Elisabeth Griffith =

American historian, author, and educator

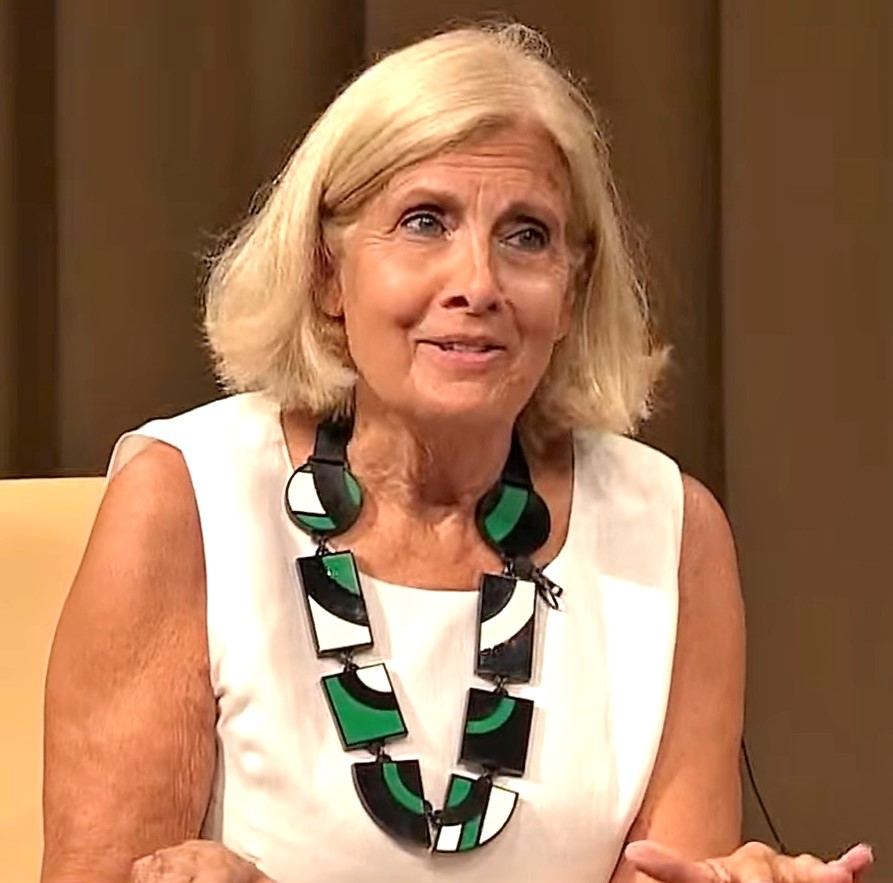
- Griffith speaks to the US National Archives about Formidable in 2022
- Education: Ph.D., American University; M.A., Johns Hopkins University; B.A., Wellesley College
- Notable work: Formidable: American Women and the Fight for Equality, 1920–2020; In Her Own Right: The Life of Elizabeth Cady Stanton

Elisabeth Griffith is an American historian, educator, and activist. She is the author of Formidable: American Women and the Fight for Equality: 1920–2020, and In Her Own Right: The Life of Elizabeth Cady Stanton. Early in her career, she held leadership positions in the Women's Campaign Fund and the National Women's Political Caucus, before serving as head of the Madeira School for 22 years.

== Early life and education ==
Born near Detroit, Michigan, Griffith was the second of two daughters, and grew up in a family that was Republican. Her mother was a teacher. Her father worked for the Ford Motor Co.

Griffith earned a bachelor's degree at Wellesley College, where she became friends with Hillary Clinton. She has a master's degree from Johns Hopkins University. She briefly attended Stanford Law School, but dropped out after one semester. In 1982, she received a Ph.D. in history from American University. Griffith has also been a fellow at the Harvard Kennedy School.

== Career ==
After graduating from college, Griffith was involved with the National Women's Political Caucus, first as a volunteer, then as vice chairwoman, treasurer, and advisory board member. She was one of the five original board members of the National Women's Education Fund, its unofficial training arm.

She subsequently served as the Republican co-chairwoman of the Women's Campaign Fund, a bipartisan political action committee supporting candidates throughout the United States. Although she had attended every Republican National Convention since 1972, she decided not to attend in 1984 to protest the Republican Party's stance on women's issues under President Ronald Reagan, a position she explained in her article "Why I'm Not Going to Dallas", published in Newsweek.

Griffith's first book, In Her Own Right: The Life of Elizabeth Cady Stanton, was published in 1984 by Oxford University Press.

From 1988 to 2010, she was head of the Madeira School. In 1999, First Lady Hillary Clinton was the inaugural speaker at the Elisabeth Griffith Women's Leadership Lecture Series, which the school's board of directors named after Griffith in recognition of her first ten years at the helm.

In 2022, her second book, Formidable: American Women and the Fight for Equality: 1920–2020, was published by Pegasus Books. In Formidable, Griffith explores how the equal rights and civil rights movements were "interwoven" during the 100-year period since the ratification of the 19th Amendment, giving women the right to vote in the United States.

== Critical reception ==
In her Washington Post review of Formidable: American Women and the Fight for Equality, Connie Schulz wrote that Griffith "does an exemplary job of showing how women have always discovered ways to be powerful, regardless of obstacles." Schulz notes that the book's "most uncomfortable passages" were also the most "necessary", particularly with regard to historic racism within the feminist movement. Writing for The New York Times Book Review, Mira Ptacin lauded Griffith's "inclusive, multiracial timeline of the struggles of both Black and white women in America". Ptacin observed, "At times, the book's sheer scope is overwhelming", comparing its "fire hose of information, names and actions, protests and pantsuits" to listening to Billy Joel's song, "We Didn't Start the Fire".

In 1985, a review of In Her Own Right: The Life of Elizabeth Cady Stanton in The Journal of American History stated that Griffith did "a careful job of showing the relationship between the development of Stanton's life experience and social thought", while also expressing skepticism of her use of social learning theory as a means of explaining Stanton's behavior.

== Personal life ==
She married John Deardourff, a Republican political strategist, in 1970, and has two children and two stepchildren. The couple both worked for feminist pro-choice cause and left the Republican party. Deardourff died in 2004.

== Works ==
=== Books ===
- Formidable: American women and the fight for equality: 1920–2020, Pegasus Books, New York, 2022. ISBN 9781639361892
- In her own right: the life of Elizabeth Cady Stanton, Oxford University Press, New York, 1984. ISBN 9780195034400
