= Takahiro Sakurai =

Japanese voice actor and narrator (born 1974)

- 櫻井 孝宏
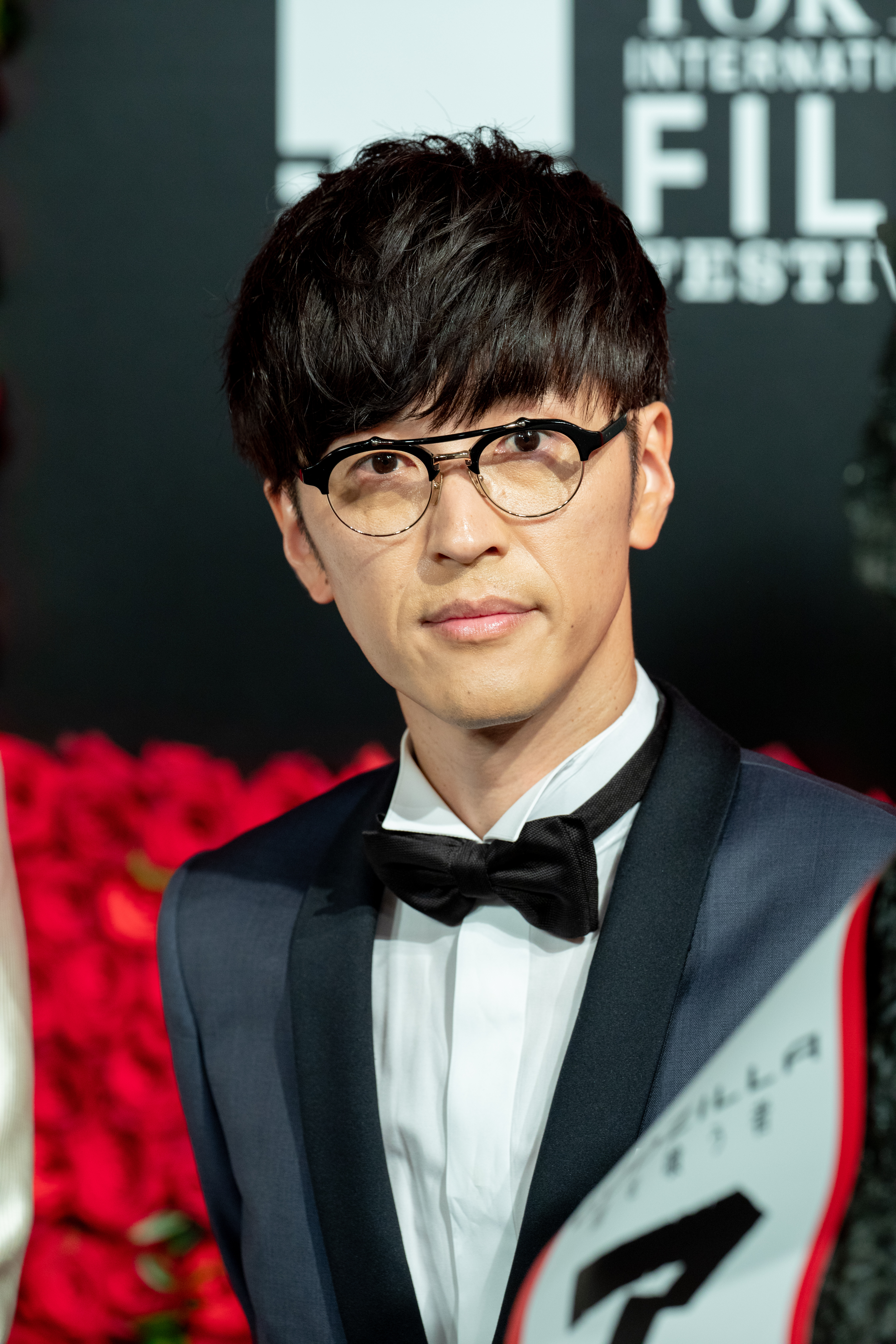
- Sakurai at the 31st Tokyo International Film Festival (October 2018)
- Born: June 13, 1974 (age 52); Okazaki, Aichi, Japan
- Occupations: Voice actor; narrator; radio personality
- Years active: 1996–present
- Agent: Freelance

Takahiro Sakurai (櫻井 孝宏, Sakurai Takahiro; born June 13, 1974) is a Japanese voice actor, narrator, and radio personality from Aichi Prefecture, Japan. His well-known roles include heroes such as Cloud Strife in Compilation of Final Fantasy VII, Suzaku Kururugi in Code Geass, Izuru Kira in Bleach, X in Mega Man X, Arataka Reigen in Mob Psycho 100, Giyu Tomioka in Demon Slayer: Kimetsu no Yaiba, and Burton in Ninjala, as well as villains such as Maximilien Robespierre in Le Chevalier D'Eon, Hiltz in Zoids: Guardian Force, Sasori in Naruto Shippūden, Rohan Kishibe in JoJo's Bizarre Adventure: Diamond is Unbreakable, and Suguru Geto in Jujutsu Kaisen. He voiced the main character Miyuki Kazuya in Ace of Diamond. He is the official Japanese dub voice for Robert Pattinson since Twilight. His range is tenor.

== Early life ==
Sakurai is the eldest of three siblings born to a family who owned a rice shop. When he was a child, he became interested in voice acting after watching a television interview with a voice actor. He graduated from Okazaki Johsei High School. After graduating from Yoyogi Animation Academy in Nagoya and 81 Acting Institute, he made his official anime debut in 1996 with the TV animation series Bakusō Kyōdai Let's & Go!!. Sakurai stated that he would have taken over his family's rice shop if he did not pursue voice acting.

== Career ==
After moving on from the training school, he became a member of 81 Produce under the influence of his admiration for Toshihiko Seki. Even before his official debut, he had already received work in radio dramas and other projects during his time at the training school, but for a while after his debut, there was a period of time when he was unable to find work even after auditioning. In 1999, when he was 25 years old and wondering if he should quit voice acting, he got regular roles in two TV anime in a row, Digimon Adventure and Sensual Phrase, and in the same year, he sang his first character song in his first starring film, Gate Keepers.

From August 31 to September 3, 2006, Sakurai appeared in Eternity, a stage play produced by the theater troupe Joy. Sakurai and Joy were accused of copyright infringement, as Eternity was based on Kōki Mitani's stage play Tokyo Sunshine Boys' Trap. Sakurai, as well as his agency, 81 Produce, issued apologies.

On April 22, 2011, Sakurai won the "Male Character Voice Award" at Famitsu Awards 2010. In 2012, he won the "Overseas Fan's Award" at the 6th Seiyu Awards.

In 2013, after a year of discussions with the record company, Sakurai announced on his radio show that he would be singing the character song for Shirokuma Cafe. In April, he announced on the radio show "Cherry Bell Co., Ltd" that he would be leaving 81 Produce, where he had worked since his debut, and going freelance. On July 20, 2014, it was announced on the official website that he became a member of INTENTION, founded by his friend Kenichi Suzumura.

On October 25, 2016, Sakurai stepped on the red carpet at the 27th Tokyo International Film Festival as John Paul in Genocidal Organ with Yuichi Nakamura as Clavis Shepherd. On October 25, 2018, he attended the 31st Tokyo International Film Festival as Metofies in Godzilla: The Planet Eater with Mamoru Miyano as Haruo.

Sakurai lists people like Ryūsei Nakao, Chō, Ryōtarō Okiayu, Tomokazu Seki, and Minami Takayama as his favorite and respected voice actors, and he had a close relationship with Keiji Fujiwara in his private life. He is good at illustration and once wanted to be an illustrator. In addition to the eyecatching illustrations in Canvas 2: Niji Iro no Sketch, he was also a member of the key drawing staff for the final episode of Code Geass: Lelouch of the Rebellion R2, and was credited as a logotype designer for the second season of Active Raid.

== Personal life ==
Sakurai has been married to a former voice actress for nearly 20 years, which was not disclosed to the public until September 2022 after he acknowledged a report published by Shukan Bunshun. On October 26, 2022, Shukan Bunshun reported that Sakurai had been having an extramarital affair with a writer from his radio show, P.S. Genki Desu: Takahiro, which had been terminated suddenly on October 24, 2022, without any explanation. The two had been in a relationship for 10 years, with them intending to marry; however, the writer had allegedly not been aware of Sakurai's marital status until September 2022. On November 3, 2022, the chief of Second Shot, the company behind Sakurai's radio show, apologized to the listeners, who were upset from Sakurai and the writer dating and having to listen to them on the radio show. In the same announcement, they cancelled preorders for a product originally set to be released in November 2022.

== Filmography ==
=== Television animation ===
Year	Title	Role	Notes
1996	Bakusō Kyōdai Let's & Go!!	Leone; Waldegald	
1997	Pokémon	Sand, Semi-final Announcer	
1998	Ah My Goddess: Being Small is Convenient	Kagerou	
1998	Cardcaptor Sakura	Kouichi Kouno	
1998	Hamos: The Green Chariot	Abel	
1998	Master Keaton	Ralph	
1998	The Mysterious Cities of Gold	Soldier	
1999	Digimon Adventure	Tentomon, Kabuterimon, AtlurKabuterimon, Phantomon, Scorpiomon, Hagurumon	
1999	Initial D Second Stage	THUNDERS member	
1999	Sensual Phrase	Yoshihiko "Santa" Nagai	
1999	Zoids: Chaotic Century	Hilts	
2000	Boogiepop Phantom	Delinquent B	
2000	Digimon Adventure 02	Tentomon, Kabuterimon, AtlurKabuterimon	
2000	Gate Keepers	Shun Ukiya	
2000	Gravitation	Host	
2000	Pocket Monsters	AD	
2000	Shin Getter Robo vs Neo Getter Robo	Gô Ichimonji	
2001	Angel Tales	Genbu no Shin	
2001	Beyblade	Tonny	
2001	Cyborg 009	Joe Shimamura/009	
2001	Galaxy Angel	Great Muscle	
2001	Gene Shaft	Hiroto Amagiwa	
2001	Hikaru no Go	Kaoru Kishimoto	
2001	Kasumin	Kasumi Senta	
2001	Offside	Noriyuki Akechi	
2001	Prétear	Sasame	
2001	Slayers Premium	Chie-tako	
2001	Star Ocean EX	Gabriel Celeste	
2001	Zoids: New Century Zero	Bit Cloud	
2002	Gate Keepers 21	Shun Okiya	
2002	GetBackers	Kagami Kyoji	
2002	Heat Guy J	Boma	
2002	I"s (OVA)	Seto Ichitaka	
2002	Mao Dante	Sosuke Oshiba	
2002	Mirmo de Pon!	Chikku	
2002	Ojamajo Doremi Dokkān	Hiroaki Shibata	
2002	Princess Tutu	Fakir	
2002	Samurai Deeper Kyo	Kubira	
2002	Tokyo Underground	Sui	
2003	Cromartie High School	Takashi Kamiyama	
2003	Guardian Hearts	Kazuya Watari	
2003	Kaleido Star	Leon Oswald	
2003	Lunar Legend Tsukihime	Arihiko Inui	
2003	Peacemaker Kurogane	Susumu Yamazaki	
2003	Saint Beast	Genbu no Shin	
2003	The Mythical Detective Loki Ragnarok	Loki (older)	
2003	Transformers Armada	Double Face (Sideways)	
2003	Zatch Bell!	Kiyomaro Takamine	
2004	Cho Henshin CosPrayers	Kuls Pristo	
2004	Detective Conan	Takuya Masubuchi	
2004	Diamond Daydreams	Kurokawa	
2004	Gakuen Alice	Misaki	
2004	Kyo Kara Maoh!	Yuuri Shibuya & Morgif	
2004	Meine Liebe	Orpherus Fürst von Marmelade nahe Gorz	
2004	Phantom – The Animation	Reiji Azuma/Zwei	
2004	Tactics	Haruka	
2004	Tsukuyomi -Moon Phase-	Seiji Midou	
2004	Zoids: Fuzors	Gene	
2005	Absolute Boy	Shigeki Kobayakawa	
2005	Black Cat	Jenos Hazard	
2005	Bleach	Izuru Kira	
2005	Canvas 2	Kamikura Hiroki	
2005	Gun X Sword	Ray Langlen	
2005	Pani Poni Dash!	Shu Momose	
2005	Rozen Maiden Träumend	Shirosaki	
2005	Saint Seiya Hades: Inferno	Dragon Shiryu	
2005	Suki na Mono wa Suki Dakara Shouganai	Fuuta Kitamura	Episode 13
2005	Tales of Legendia	Walter Delques	
2005	Last Order: Final Fantasy VII	Cloud Strife	
2006	.hack//Roots	Haseo	
2006	Ayakashi: Samurai Horror Tales	The Medicine Seller	
2006	Black Blood Brothers	Jirou Mochizuki	
2006	Code Geass: Lelouch of the Rebellion	Suzaku Kururugi	
2006	D.Gray-man	Yu Kanda	
2006	D.I.C.E.	Macchiatto	
2006	Gakuen Heaven	Endou Kazuki	
2006	Innocent Venus	Jin Tsurusawa	
2006	Karin	Kurobara no Ouji	
2006	Le Chevalier D'Eon	Maximilien Robespierre	
2006	Legend of the Glass Fleet	Michel/Gilles	
2006	Major	Naoki Enomoto	
2006	Musashi Gundoh	Kojiro Sasaki	
2006	Ring ni Kakero 1: Nichibei Kessen Hen	Shadow Jun	
2006	Zegapain	Toga Vital	
2006	Zero no Tsukaima	Guiche	
2006	Junjou Romantica	Takahashi Misaki	
2007	Jyūshin Enbu – Hero Tales	Ryūkō	
2007	Kimikiss	Eiji Kai	
2007	Mononoke	The Medicine Seller	
2007	Naruto: Shippuden	Sasori	
2007	Saint Beast: Kouin Jojishi Tenshi Tan	Genbu no Shin	
2007	Zero no Tsukaima: Futatsu no Kishi	Guiche	
2007	Zombie-Loan	Shito Tachibana	
2008	Code Geass: Lelouch of the Rebellion R2	Suzaku Kururugi	
2008	Hatenkō Yūgi	Alzeid	
2008	Junjou Romantica 2	Misaki Takahashi	
2008	Kyou Kara Maoh!	Yuuri Shibuya, Morgif	
2008	Saint Seiya The Hades: Elysion	Dragon Shiryu	
2008	The Tower of Druaga: the Aegis of URUK	Neeba	
2008	Zero no Tsukaima: Princesse no Rondo	Guiche	
2009	Bakemonogatari	Meme Oshino	
2009	Cross Game	Azuma Yuuhei	
2009	Genji Monogatari Sennenki	Hikaru Genji	
2009	Hatsukoi Limited	Sogabe Hiroyuki	
2009	Seitokai no Ichizon	Echo Of Death	
2009	Shangri-La	Kudo Shougo	
2009	Valkyria Chronicles	Faldio Landzaat	
2010	Chu-Bra!!	Keigo Hayama	
2010	Digimon Xros Wars	Dorulumon	
2010	House of Five Leaves	Yaichi	
2010	Hyakka Ryouran Samurai Girls	Tokugawa Yoshihiko	
2010	Kuroshitsuji II	Claude Faustus	
2010	Nurarihyon no Mago	Kubinashi	
2010	Otome Yōkai Zakuro	Kei Agemaki	
2010	Soredemo Machi wa Mawatteiru	Uki Isohata	
2010	The Legend of the Legendary Heroes	Tiir Rumibul	
2010	Transformers: Animated	Blurr	
2010	Tatakau Shisho – The Book of Bantorra	Ruruta	
2010	Uragiri wa Boku no Namae wo Shitteiru (Betrayal Knows My Name)	Luka Crosszeria	
2011	Anohana: The Flower We Saw That Day	Atsumu Matsuyuki	
2011	[C]	Masakaki	
2011	Dantalian no Shoka	Armand Jeremiah	
2011	Dog Days	Framboise Charle	
2011	Kami-sama no Memo-chou	Hiroaki Kuwahara "Hiro"	
2011	Nura: Rise of the Yokai Clan	Kubinashi	
2011	Phi Brain: Puzzle of God	Rook Banjo Crossfield	
2011	Tegami Bachi Reverse	Jeel	
2011	Toriko	Coco	
2011	High Score	Kyosuke Masuda	
2011	Natsume Yuujinchou San	Natsume's Adoptive Brother	Episode 12
2012	Accel World	Blue Knight/Blue King	
2012	Berserk Film Trilogy	Griffith	
2012	Brave 10	Hanzō Hattori	
2012	Daily Lives of High School Boys	Yuusuke Tabata	
2012	Digimon Xros Wars: The Young Hunters Who Leapt Through Time	Dorulumon, Tentomon	
2012	Rock Lee & His Ninja Pals	Sasori	
2012	Phi Brain: Puzzle of God Season 2	Rook Banjo Crossfield	
2012	Shirokuma Café	Shirokuma (Polar Bear)	
2012	Zero no Tsukaima F	Guiche	
2012	Kono Naka ni Hitori, Imōto ga Iru!	Shougo Mikadono	
2012	The Ambition of Oda Nobuna	Hanzō Hattori	
2012	Dog Days	Framboise Charle	
2012	Tsuritama	Urara	
2012	Fairy Tail	Sting Eucliffe	2nd Season in 2014, Final Season in 2018
2012	Suki-tte Ii na yo.	Yamato Kurosawa	
2012	Magi: The Labyrinth of Magic	Ja'far	
2012	K	Izumo Kusanagi	
2012	Sakura-sō no Pet na Kanojo	Jin Mitaka	
2012	Psycho-Pass	Shogo Makishima	
2013	Devil Survivor 2: The Animation	Alcor (Anguished One)	
2013	Senyū	Janua Ein, Februar Zwei (Orb Half)	
2013	Log Horizon	Crusty	
2013	Hyakka Ryouran Samurai Bride	Tokugawa Yoshihiko	
2013	Uchōten Kazoku	Yasaburō Shimogamo	
2013	Servant × Service	Taishi Ichimiya	
2013	Dog & Scissors	Kazuhito Harumi	
2013	Danganronpa: The Animation	Leon Kuwata	
2013	Dokidoki! PreCure	Joe Okada	
2013	Ace of Diamond	Kazuya Miyuki	
2013	Magi: The Kingdom of Magic	Ja'far	
2013	Unbreakable Machine-Doll	Shin	
2013	Kingdom Season 2	Lun Hu	
2014	Buddy Complex	Bizon Gerafil	
2014	Noragami	Rabou	
2014	Tokyo Ravens	Shidō Dairenji (Yashamaru)	
2014	Nobunaga the Fool	Akechi Mitsuhide	
2014	Riddle Story of Devil	Ataru Mizorogi	
2014	Soul Eater Not!	Akane Hoshi	
2014	Knights of Sidonia	Norio Kunato	
2014	The World is Still Beautiful	Bardwin Cecil Ifrikia (Bard)	
2014	Chaika – The Coffin Princess	Shin Acura	
2014	Baby Steps	Yu Nabae	
2014	Nobunaga Concerto	Takenaka Shigeharu	
2014	Aldnoah.Zero	Trillram	
2014	Shirogane no Ishi Argevollen	Schlein Richthofen	
2014	Tokyo Ghoul	Uta	
2014	Buddy Complex Kanketsu-hen: Ano Sora ni Kaeru Mirai de	Bizon Gerafil/Evgeni Kedar	
2014	Chaika – The Coffin Princess: Avenging Battle	Shin Acura	
2014	Ōkami Shōjo to Kuro Ōji	Kyouya Sata	
2014	Grisaia no Kajitsu	Yūji Kazami	
2014	Gugure! Kokkuri-san	Inugami	
2014	Donten ni Warau	Shirasu Kinjō	
2014	Psycho-Pass 2	Sho Hinakawa	
2014	Log Horizon 2	Crusty	
2014	Akatsuki no Yona	Kang Tae Jun	
2014	Nanatsu no Taizai	Griamor	
2014	Rage of Bahamut: Genesis	Lucifer	
2015	Tokyo Ghoul √A	Uta	
2015	Death Parade	Shimada	
2015	Maria the Virgin Witch	Bernard	
2015	Miritari!	Corporal Glue	
2015	Dog Days	Framboise Charle	
2015	Absolute Duo	K	
2015	Detective Conan	Ryusuke Higo	
2015	Minna Atsumare! Falcom Gakuen SC	《C》	
2015	Shirobako	Nogame Takezou	
2015	Tsubasa to Hotaru	Yūma Toba	
2015	Seraph of the End	Ferid Bathory	
2015	Sidonia no Kishi: Dai-kyū Wakusei Sen'eki	Norio Kunato	
2015	Food Wars: Shokugeki no Soma	Satoshi Isshiki	
2015	Sound! Euphonium	Noboru Taki	
2015	Baby Steps Season 2	Yu Nabae	
2015	Le Labyrinthe de la Grisaia, Le Eden de la Grisaia	Yūji Kazami	
2015	Diamond no Ace Second Season	Miyuki Kazuya	
2015	Gangsta.	Marco Adriano	
2015	Rampo Kitan: Game of Laplace	Akechi	
2015	Junjo Romantica 3	Misaki Takahashi	
2015	Diabolik Lovers More, Blood	Ruki Mukami	
2015	K: Return of Kings	Izumo Kusanagi	
2015	One-Punch Man	Zombieman	
2015	Seraph of the End: Battle in Nagoya	Ferid Bathory	
2015	Mr. Osomatsu	Osomatsu Matsuno	
2015	Mobile Suit Gundam: Iron-Blooded Orphans	McGillis Fareed	
2015	Utawarerumono: Itsuwari no Kamen	Ougi	
2015	World Trigger: Isekai Kara no Tobosha	Gieve	
2015	The Asterisk War	Ernest Fairclough	
2015	Gintama°	Saitou Shimaru	
2015	Haikyū!! Season 2	Akiteru Tsukishima	
2016	Prince of Stride Alternative	Tomoe Yagami	
2016	Ajin: Demi-Human	Yū Tosaki	
2016	Divine Gate	Santa Claus	
2016	Sekkō Boys	Hironori Yanagisawa	
2016	Active Raid: Kidou Kyoushuushitsu Dai Hachi Gakari	Sōichirō Sena	
2016	Please Tell Me! Galko-chan	Charao	
2016	Magi: Adventure of Sinbad	Ja'far	
2016	JoJo's Bizarre Adventure: Diamond Is Unbreakable	Rohan Kishibe	
2016	Mob Psycho 100	Reigen Arataka	
2016	First Love Monster	Kanade Takahashi	
2016	Bungo Stray Dogs	Francis Scott Key Fitzgerald	
2016	Joker Game	Tazaki	
2016	Flying Witch	Haru no Hakobiya	
2016	Berserk	Griffith/Femto	
2016	91 Days	Barbero	
2016	Days	Yūta Usui	
2016	Food Wars! Shokugeki no Soma: The Second Plate	Satoshi Isshiki	
2016	Ajin: Demi-Human 2nd Season	Yū Tosaki	
2016	Active Raid: Kidou Kyoushuushitsu Dai Hachi Gakari 2nd	Sōichirō Sena	
2016	The Heroic Legend of Arslan: Dust Storm Dance	Shagard	
2016	Time Bokan 24	Kattonbo, Sasomobile	Ep.5 (Kattonbo), 7 (Sasomobile)
2016	The Great Passage	Mitsuya Majime	
2016	Drifters	Abe no Seimei	
2016	March Comes in like a Lion	Takashi Hayashida	
2016	Haikyu!! Season 3	Akiteru Tsukishima	
2017	Atom: The Beginning	Tsutsumi Moriya	
2017	Altair: A Record of Battles	Glalat Bellrik	
2017	Dive!!	Yōichi Fujitani	
2017	Castlevania	Hector	
2017	Infini-T Force	George Minami/Tekkaman	
2017	Food Wars! Shokugeki no Soma: The Third Plate	Satoshi Isshiki	(also 2018)
2017	Magical Circle Guru Guru	Gipple	Eps.4–10, 13-,
2017	Mr. Osomatsu 2	Osomatsu Matsuno	
2017	Recovery of an MMO Junkie	Yuta Sakurai	
2017	Sagrada Reset	Masamune Urachi	
2017	Welcome to the Ballroom	Masami Kugimiya	
2017	Yu-Gi-Oh! VRAINS	Ai	
2018	Record of Grancrest War	Villar Constance	
2018	Black Clover	Patry/Licht	
2018	Devils' Line	Kirio Kikuhara	
2018	Hoshin Engi	Supushan	
2018	Nil Admirari no Tenbin: Teito Genwaku Kitan	Rui Sagisawa	
2018	Space Battleship Tiramisu	Isuzu Ichinose	
2018	Tokyo Ghoul:re	Uta	
2018	Tada Never Falls in Love	Charles de Loire	
2018	Cells at Work!	Helper T Cell	
2018	Angels of Death	Danny	
2018	Phantom in the Twilight	Vlad Garfunkel	
2018	100 Sleeping Princes and the Kingdom of Dreams	Orion	
2018	Zoids Wild	Bacon	
2018	Overlord II & III	Jircniv Rune Farlord El Nix	
2018	Karakuri Circus	Eiryō Ashihana	
2019	Mob Psycho 100 II	Reigen Arataka	
2019	Pop Team Epic	Popuko	Special (Black Tortoise)
2019	Revisions	Mikio Dōjima	
2019	That Time I Got Reincarnated as a Slime	Diablo	
2019	Ace of Diamond Act II	Kazuya Miyuki	
2019	Fruits Basket	Ayame Sōma	
2019	Demon Slayer: Kimetsu no Yaiba	Giyu Tomioka	
2019	Midnight Occult Civil Servants	Satoru Kanoichi	
2019	One-Punch Man 2	Zombieman	
2019	Carole & Tuesday	Spencer	
2019	Ahiru no Sora	Sei Shirai	
2019	Fate/Grand Order – Absolute Demonic Front: Babylonia	Merlin	
2019	Babylon	Shinobu Kujiin	
2019	Phantasy Star Online 2: Episode Oracle	Luther	
2019	Stars Align	Takayuki Sakurai	
2019	Food Wars! Shokugeki no Soma: The Fourth Plate	Satoshi Isshiki	
2019	Psycho-Pass 3	Sho Hinakawa	
2020	A Destructive God Sits Next to Me	Kabuto Hanadori	
2020	Akudama Drive	Cutthroat	
2020	Appare-Ranman!	Dylan G. Ordene	
2020	Digimon Adventure:	Tentomon	
2020	Dragon Quest: The Adventure of Dai	Avan De Zinuar III	
2020	Drifting Dragons	Niko	
2020	Fire Force	Yuichiro Kurono	
2020	Food Wars! Shokugeki no Souma: The Fifth Plate	Satoshi Isshiki	
2020	Gleipnir	Alien	
2020	Ikebukuro West Gate Park	Reiichirō Yokoyama	
2020	Jujutsu Kaisen	Kenjaku / "Suguru Geto"	
2020	Mr. Osomatsu 3	Osomatsu Matsuno	
2020	Pokémon: Twilight Wings	Dande	
2020	The Case Files of Jeweler Richard	Richard Ranashinha de Vulpian	
2020	Woodpecker Detective's Office	Kyōsuke Kindaichi	
2021	Backflip!!	Shūsaku Shida	
2021	Fena: Pirate Princess	Shitan	
2021	Getter Robo Arc	Go Ichimonji	
2021	Hortensia Saga	Lucan	
2021	Log Horizon: Destruction of the Round Table	Crusty	
2021	Night Head 2041	Takuya Kuroki	
2021	Ranking of Kings	Despa	
2021	Seven Knights Revolution: Hero Successor	Jenius	
2021	That Time I Got Reincarnated as a Slime Season 2	Diablo	
2021	The Saint's Magic Power Is Omnipotent	Albert Hawke	
2022	Blue Lock	Sae Itoshi	
2022	Fanfare of Adolescence	Yutaka Asahi	
2022	Mob Psycho 100 III	Reigen Arataka	
2022	Bleach: Thousand-Year Blood War	Izuru Kira	
2022	Ninjala	Burton	
2022	Shenmue	Lan Di	
2022	Urusei Yatsura	Tsubame Ozuno	
2022	Utawarerumono: Mask of Truth	Ougi	
2023	The Saint's Magic Power Is Omnipotent 2nd Season	Albert Hawke	
2023	Jujutsu Kaisen 2nd Season	Suguru Geto, Kenjaku	
2024	That Time I Got Reincarnated as a Slime Season 3	Diablo	
2025	Mr. Osomatsu 4	Osomatsu Matsuno	
2026	Ace of Diamond Act II season 2	Kazuya Miyuki	
2026	Iron Wok Jan	Kei Sawada	
2026	Jujutsu Kaisen 3rd Season	Kenjaku	
2026	Petals of Reincarnation	Carlos N. Hathcock	
2026	That Time I Got Reincarnated as a Slime Season 4	Diablo	
2026	The World Is Dancing	Ashikaga Yoshimitsu	

=== OVA/ONA/Films ===
Year	Title	Role	Notes
2001	Shin Getter Robo vs Neo Getter Robo	Gou Ichimonji	
2002	Beat Angel Escalayer	Kyohei Yanase	
2003	Eiken	Shima Kurosawa	
2003	Gate Keepers 21	Shun Ukiya	
2003	.hack//Liminality	Tomonari Kasumi	
2005	Final Fantasy VII Advent Children	Cloud Strife	
2005	Irregular Hunter X: The Day of Σ	X	
2005	Majokko Tsukune-chan	Mr. Major	
2005	Last Order: Final Fantasy VII	Cloud Strife	
2005	Konjiki no Gash Bell: Attack of the Mecha-Vulcan	Kiyomaro Takamine	
2006	Harukanaru Toki no Naka de Maihitoyo	Oo no Suefumi	
2007	Karas	Ekou Hoshunin	
2007	Tokyo Marble Chocolate	Yudai	
2007	Vexille	Ryo	
2006	Kirepapa	Shunsuke Sakaki	
2009	Dogs: Bullets & Carnage	Haine Rammsteiner	
2009	Saint Seiya: The Lost Canvas	Gryphon Minos	
2009	Switch	Hal Kurabayashi	
2011	Fate/Prototype	Saber/Arthur Pendragon	
2011	Katte ni Kaizo	Kaizō Katsu	
2012	Guilty Crown: Lost Xmas	Scrooge	
2012	Naruto the Movie: Road to Ninja	Sasori	
2014	K: Missing Kings	Izumo Kusanagi	
2014	Santa Company	Pedro	
2014	Tsubasa to Hotaru	Yuuma Toba	
2015	Ajin Part 1: Shōdō	Tosaki	
2015	Digimon Adventure tri.	Tentomon, Kabuterimon, AtlurKabuterimon, HerakleKabuterimon	
2015	Diabolik Lovers More, Blood	Ruki Mukami	
2015	Psycho-Pass Movie	Sho Hinakawa	
2016	Ajin Part 2: Shōtotsu	Tosaki	
2016	Ajin Part 3: Shōgeki	Tosaki	
2016	Kizumonogatari Part 1: Tekketsu	Meme Oshino	
2016	One Piece Film: Gold	young Gildo Tesoro	
2017	Blame!	Killy	
2017	Fireworks, Should We See It from the Side or the Bottom?	Mitsuishi	
2017	Genocidal Organ	John Paul	
2017	Godzilla: Planet of the Monsters	Metphies	
2017	Haikara-san: Here Comes Miss Modern	Tousei Aoe	(2017–2018)
2017	First Love Monster OVA	Kanade Takahashi	
2017	Thus Spoke Kishibe Rohan	Rohan Kishibe	(2017–present)
2017–2018	Code Geass Lelouch of the Rebellion	Suzaku Kururugi	3-Part Compilation Film
2018	Godzilla: City on the Edge of Battle	Metphies	
2018	Godzilla: The Planet Eater	Metphies	
2019	7 Seeds	Ryō	
2019	Fafner in the Azure: The Beyond	Marespero	
2019	Human Lost	Masao Horiki	
2019	Demon Slayer: Kimetsu no Yaiba: The Bonds of Siblings	Giyu Tomioka	
2019	Knights of the Zodiac: Saint Seiya	Dragon Shiryū	
2019	Levius	Bill Weinberg	
2019	Mr. Osomatsu: The Movie	Osomatsu Matsuno	
2019	Pokemon: Detective Pikachu	Detective Pikachu	
2019	Seven Days War	Masahiko Honda	
2019	Code Geass Lelouch of the Re;surrection	Suzaku Kururugi	
2019	Sound! Euphonium: The Movie – Our Promise: A Brand New Day	Noboru Taki	
2020	Digimon Adventure: Last Evolution Kizuna	Tentomon	
2020	Cagaster of an Insect Cage	Franz Kirio	
2020	Happy-Go-Lucky Days	Sawa-sensei	
2021	Record of Ragnarok	Poseidon	
2021	The Heike Story	Taira no Shigemori	
2021	Jujutsu Kaisen 0	Suguru Geto	
2022	Thermae Romae Novae	Yoshida	
2022	Mr. Osomatsu: Hipipo-Zoku to Kagayaku Kajitsu	Osomatsu Matsuno	
2022	Backflip!!	Shūsaku Shida	
2022	Laid-Back Camp Movie	Wataru Shima	
2022	Exception	Mack	
2022	That Time I Got Reincarnated as a Slime the Movie: Scarlet Bond	Diablo	
2023	Junji Ito Maniac: Japanese Tales of the Macabre	Kazuya Hikizuri	
2024	Fureru	Man at the Bar	
2024	Code Geass: Rozé of the Recapture	Suzaku Kururugi / Zero	4-Part Film Series; Cameo
2025	Shinran: The Purpose of Life	Young Shinran	
2025	Demon Slayer: Kimetsu no Yaiba – The Movie: Infinity Castle	Giyu Tomioka	
2026	Mononoke the Movie: The Curse of the Serpent	"Ri" Medicine Seller	
2026	That Time I Got Reincarnated as a Slime the Movie: Tears of the Azure Sea	Diablo	
2026	Armored Trooper VOTOMS: Die Graue Hexe	Oliver	

Unknown date

- .hack//G.U. Trilogy as Haseo
- Divine Love as Hyde
- Vie Durant as Di

=== Drama CDs ===
- The Apothecary Diaries (2020) as Jinshi
- 1K Apartment no Koi
- 7th Dragon 2020 & 2020-II Drama CD as Takehaya
- Adekan as Yoshiwara Anri
- Aka no Shinmon as Kei Kazuragawa
- Akaya Akashiya Ayakashino as Akiyoshi Tochika
- Are you Alice? as Alice
- Ai wo Utau yori Ore ni Oborero! (Blaue Rosen) as Rui Kiryuuin
- Baito wa Maid!? as Minori Ogata
- Baito wa Maid!? 2 – Shuubun!? Senden!? as Minori Ogata
- BALETT STAR as Horinouchi Keisuke
- Be My Princess as Glenn J. Cashiragi
- Buddy Complex BC EXTRA STORIES Vol.6 as Bizon Gerafil
- Code Geass – Lelouch of the Rebellion as Suzaku Kururugi
- Cyborg 009 Drama CD: Love Stories as Joe Shimamura
- Diabolik Lovers as Ruki Mukami
- Dogs: Bullets & Carnage as Haine Rammsteiner
- Dolls as Toudou Usaki
- Ecstasy wa Eien ni ~Utsukushiki Rougoku~ (Takaomi)
- Executive Boy (Hiromi Kuresaka)
- Fate/Prototype Special Drama CD(Christmas Murder Case) as Saber/Arthur Pendragon
- Fate/Prototype: Sougin no Fragments as Saber/Arthur Pendragon
- Fushigi Yugi Genbu Kaiden as Rimudo/Uruki (male form)
- Gaki no Ryoubun series 3: Saikyou Hiiruzu (Chiaki Hidaka)
- Gaki no Ryoubun series 5: Akuun no Jouken (Chiaki Hidaka)
- Gaki no Ryoubun series 7: Monster Panic (Chiaki Hidaka)
- Gouka Kyakusen de Koi wa Hajimaru series as Minato Kurahara
- Gray Zone as Yuzuru Kousaka
- Hatenkō Yūgi as Alzeid
- Hatoful Boyfriend as Anghel Higure
- Junjou Boy Series 2: Junjou Heart Kaihouku as Kouji Nakazawa
- Junjo Romantica as Misaki Takahashi
- Kamui as Atsuma Hasumi
- Kairyuu Gakuen Twins series 1: Scandalous Twins (Kazuma Kitashiro)
- Kairyuu Gakuen Twins series 2: Dangerous Twins (Kazuma Kitashiro)
- Kedamono as Rentarou Sakakibara
- Kirepapa as Shunsuke Sakaki
- Kiss to do-jin! ~Ōjisama wa Karisuma Ōte!?~ as Tooru Hikawa
- Kyo Kara Maoh! as Yuri Shibuya
- L DK as Kugayama Shuusei
- Love Mode as Rin Takimura
- Lovely Complex as Atsushi Otani
- Mahou Gakuen Series 1: Binetsu Club (Ryuui)
- Mahou Gakuen Series 2: Himitsu Garden (Ryuui)
- Mahou Gakuen Series 3: Mugen Palace (Ryuui)
- Mahou Gakuen Series 4: Yuuwaku Lesson (Ryuui)
- Mahou Gakuen Series side story: Daiundoukai Zenyasai (Ryuui)
- Miscast Series Volumes 4 onwards as Andray Hayami
- Mix★Mix★Chocolate as Hara
- Mizuki-sensei Kiki Ippatsu as Mizuki Sakanaga
- Munasawagi series as Yuuya Yamashino
- Naito wa Oatsuinoga Osuki series 1 (Kazuma Kitashiro)
- Naito wa Oatsuinoga Osuki series 2: Naito wa Hageshiinoga Osuki (Kazuma Kitashiro)
- News Center no Koibito as Narumi Kobayashi
- Ookami Shoujo to Kuro Ouji as Sata Kyouya
- Ourin Gakuen series 3: Sekushi Boizu de Sasayaide as Daisuke Nogami
- Rijichou-sama no Okiniiri as Ryou Utsunomiya
- Sacrificial Princess and the King of Beasts, Prime Minister Anubis
- Saint Seiya Ougon 12 Kyu Hen as Dragon Shiryu
- S.L.H Stray Love Hearts! as Kitou Ninomiya
- Shitsuji-sama no Okiniiri as Kanzawa Hakuou
- Shounen Yonkei
- Sket Dance as Sasuke Tsubaki
- Slavers Series as Shuuichi Kurahashi
- Sugar Apple Fairytale as Shall Fen Shall
- Sono Yubi Dake ga Shitteru as Yuichi Kazuki
- Suki na Mono wa Suki Dakara Shouganai as Fuuta Kitamura (starting from White Flower)
- Sukitte Ii Nayo as Yamato Kurosawa
- Switch as Hal Kurabayashi
- Teiden Shoujou to Hanemushi no Orchestra as Haibane
- Tokyo Yabanjin (Barbarian in Tokyo) as Ubuki Kano
- Tsumitsukuri na Kimi as Sin (Maya Sakaki)
- Tsuyogari as Shiba and Keisuke
- Uragiri wa Boku no Namae wo Shitteiru (Betrayal Knows My Name) as Luka Crosszeria
- V.B.Rose as 'ukari Arisaka
- Wagamama Prisoner (Azusa Kashiwagi)
- Wagamama Prisoner/My Master is My Classmate section (Chihiro Takarao)
- Wakakusa Monogatari ~Kami Hikouki ni Notte~ (Laurence "Laurie")
- Watashi ga Motete Dōsunda as Asuma Mutsumi
- Watashi ni xx Shinasai! as Shigure Kitami
- Yabai Kimochi (Desire) as Toru Maiki
- Yandere Heaven as Saionji Ran
- Yasashikute Toge ga Aru as Chihiro Houshou
- Yellow as Taki
- Yurigaoka Gakuen series 1: Heart mo Ace mo Boku no Mono as Kuu Houjou
- Yurigaoka Gakuen series 2: Kimidake no Prince ni Naritai as Kuu Houjou
- Zombie-Loan as Shito Tachibana

=== Live-action film ===
- Mr. Osomatsu (2022) – Osomatsu (voice)

=== Television drama ===
- Koe Koi (2016) – Matsubara (voice)

=== Tokusatsu ===
Year	Title	Role	Notes
1999	Kyukyu Sentai GoGoFive	Dream Vision Psyma Beast Bahamur	Ep.45
2011	Kaizoku Sentai Gokaiger	Jealousto	Ep.14, 24
2012	Kaizoku Sentai Gokaiger vs. Space Sheriff Gavan: The Movie	Jealousto	Movie
2013	Tokumei Sentai Go-Busters vs. Kaizoku Sentai Gokaiger: The Movie	Jealousto	Movie
2016	Ultraman Orb	Orb Ring Voice	Non Credit
2016	Ultraman Festival stageshow	Ultraman	Stageshow
2017	Ultraman Zero: The Chronicle	Orb Ring Voice	Non Credit
2018	Ultraman Orb: The Chronicle	Voice of Light	

=== Video games ===
Year	Title	Role	Notes
1999	Shenmue	Lan Di	
2001	Shenmue II	Lan Di	
2002	Kingdom Hearts	Cloud Strife	
2002	Klonoa Beach Volleyball	Guntz	
2002	Klonoa Heroes: Densetsu no Star Medal	Guntz	
2004	Rockman X: Command Mission	X	
2005	Rockman X8	X	
2005	Namco × Capcom	Guntz, Red Arremer Joker	
2005	Irregular Hunter X	X	
2005	Kingdom Hearts II	Cloud Strife	
2006	Dirge of Cerberus: Final Fantasy VII	Cloud Strife	
2006	Castlevania: Portrait of Ruin	Jonathan Morris	
2007	Saint Seiya: The Hades	Dragon Shiryu	
2007	Kingdom Hearts Re: Chain of Memories	Cloud Strife	
2007	Eternal Sonata	Fugue	
2007	Crisis Core: Final Fantasy VII	Cloud Strife	
2007	Naruto Shippuden: Gekitou Ninja Taisen! EX 2	Sasori	
2008	Valkyria Chronicles	Faldio Landzaat	
2008	Hana Yori Dango: Koi Seyo Otome!	Tsukasa Domyouji	
2008	Naruto Shippuden: Gekitou Ninja Taisen! EX 3	Sasori	
2008	Dissidia Final Fantasy	Cloud Strife	
2011	Dissidia 012 Final Fantasy	Cloud Strife	
2011	Super Robot Wars Z2: Destruction Chapter	Suzaku Kururugi	
2011	Final Fantasy Type-0	Kurasame Susaya	
2011	Saint Seiya: Sanctuary Battle	Dragon Shiryu	
2011	7th Dragon 2020	Takehaya	
2012	Super Robot Wars Z2: Rebirth Chapter	Suzaku Kururugi	
2012	Project X Zone	X	
2013	7th Dragon 2020-II	Takehaya	
2013	Saint Seiya: Brave Soldiers	Dragon Shiryu	
2015	7th Dragon III: Code VFD	Player (Male)	
2015	Project X Zone 2	Haseo, X	
2015	Dissidia Final Fantasy NT	Cloud Strife	
2015	Super Smash Bros. for Nintendo 3DS / Wii U	Cloud Strife	DLC
2016	World of Final Fantasy	Cloud Strife	
2017	Xenoblade Chronicles 2	Jin	
2018	Xenoblade Chronicles 2: Torna – The Golden Country	Jin	
2018	Soulcalibur VI	Grøh	
2018	Super Smash Bros. Ultimate	Cloud Strife	
2019	Teppen	X	
2019	Shenmue III	Lan Di	
2019	JoJo's Bizarre Adventure: Last Survivor	Rohan Kishibe	
2020	IDOLiSH7	Shirou Utsugi	
2020	Final Fantasy VII Remake	Cloud Strife	
2020	Ninjala	Burton	
2021	Arknights	Passenger	
2021	Honkai Impact 3rd	Su	
2022	JoJo's Bizarre Adventure: All Star Battle R	Rohan Kishibe	
2022	Fitness Runners	Max	
2022	Crisis Core: Final Fantasy VII Reunion	Cloud Strife	
2023	Final Fantasy VII: Ever Crisis	Cloud Strife	
2024	Jujutsu Kaisen: Cursed Clash	Suguru Geto	
2024	Final Fantasy VII Rebirth	Cloud Strife	
2025	The Hundred Line: Last Defense Academy	Eito Aotsuki	
2025	Final Fantasy Tactics – The Ivalice Chronicles	Cloud Strife	
2026	Dissidia Duellum Final Fantasy	Cloud Strife	

- .hack//G.U. as Haseo
- Akane-sasu Sekai de Kimi to Utau as Fujiwara no Teika
- Another Century's Episode: R as Suzaku Kururugi
- Another Century's Episode Portable as Suzaku Kururugi
- Ape Escape series as Ukki Blue
- Arena of Valor as Zanis
- Bad Apple Wars as Aruma
- Black Wolves Saga: Bloody Nightmare as Mejojo von Garibaldi
- Black Wolves Saga: Last Hope as Mejojo von Garibaldi
- Code Geass: Lost Colors as Suzaku Kururugi
- Crisis Core -Final Fantasy VII-, Dirge of Cerberus -Final Fantasy VII-, Dissidia: Final Fantasy as Cloud Strife
- Danganronpa: Trigger Happy Havoc as Leon Kuwata
- Diabolik Lovers, More Blood as Ruki Mukami
- Dragalia Lost as Orion
- Dragon Quest XI: Echoes of an Elusive Age as Jasper
- Fatal Frame IV: Mask of the Lunar Eclipse as You Haibara
- Fate Holy Grail Hot Springs War as Saber/Arthur Pendragon 〔Prototype〕
- Fate/stay night Réalta Nua: Take Off! Super Dimensional Trouble Hanafuda Epic Battle as Saber/Arthur Pendragon
- Fate/Grand Order as Merlin and Arthur Pendragon 〔Prototype〕
- Fire Emblem Echoes: Shadows of Valentia as Lukas
- Fire Emblem Heroes as Eliwood, Lukas, Julius
- Final Fantasy Type-0 as Kurasame Susaya
- Final Fantasy Type-0 HD as Kurasame Susaya
- Full House Kiss as Asaki Hanekura
- Fushigi Yūgi Genbu Kaiden Gaiden: Kagami no Miko as Rimudo/Uruki
- Galaxy Angel as Red-Eye
- Granblue Fantasy as Lucifer, Lucio, Lucilius (GB) / Rushifa (ルシファ) (JP), Shao, Suzaku Kururugi, Black Beast
- Gran Saga as Orta
- Guilty Crown: Lost Xmas as Scrooge
- Harukanaru Toki no Naka de Maihitoyo (PS2) as Oo no Suefumi
- GioGio's Bizarre Adventure as Bruno Bucciarati
- JoJo's Bizarre Adventure: Diamond Records as Rohan Kishibe
- Kyo Kara Maoh! Oresama Quest (PC) as Yuuri Shibuya
- Kyo Kara Maoh! Hajimari no Tabi (PS2) as Yuuri Shibuya
- Konjiki no Gash Bell series as Kiyomaro Takamine
- Lost Dimension as The End
- Lovely Complex as Otani Atsushi
- Memories Off 5 The Unfinished Film as Yusuke Hina
- Mermaid Prism
- Mix★Mix★Chocolate as Hara
- Mobile Suit Gundam Side Story: Missing Link as Vincent Gleissner
- Nana as Ren Honjo
- Naruto video games as Sasori
- Nioh (2017) as Ishida Mitsunari
- Nine Hours, Nine Persons, Nine Doors as Snake/Light
- Nise no Chigiri as Yamamoto Kansuke
- Nora to Toki no Kōbō: Kiri no Mori no Majo as Kyto Berman
- Onmyōji as the Medicine Seller
- Orange Honey as Shinya Shiraishi
- Phantasy Star Online 2 as Luther, Saga
- Pokémon Masters EX as Dande (Leon)
- Princess Maker 4 as Prince Sharul/Charle
- Sengoku Basara 4 Sumeragi as Sen no Rikyū
- Shenmue as Lan Di "Longsun Zhao"
- Shenmue II as Lan Di "Longsun Zhao"
- Shin Megami Tensei: Devil Survivor 2 as Alcor (Anguished One)
- Shin Megami Tensei: Strange Journey Redux as Jimenez
- Shinobi, Koi Utsutsu as Kirigakure Kuroudo
- Skylanders: Giants as Fright Rider (Japanese dub)
- Star Project Online as Yano Kazuteru
- Super Robot Wars GC as Gou Ichimonji
- Super Robot Wars Z2 as Suzaku Kururu
- Tagatame no Alchemist (The Alchemist Code) as Sol
- Tales of Legendia as Walter Delqes
- Tales of Graces as Asbel Lhant
- Tales of the Heroes: Twin Brave as Asbel Lhant
- Tales of the World: Radiant Mythology 3 as Asbel Lhant
- Tengai Makyou III: Namida as Namida
- The Bouncer as Sion Barzahd
- Tokyo Babel as Adam
- Trails of Cold Steel/Sen no Kiseki series as Crow Armbrust
- Trauma Team as CR-S01
- Ultraman Fusion Fight! as Orb Ring
- Utawarerumono: Mask of Deception as Ougi
- Utawarerumono: Mask of Truth as Ougi
- Valkyrie of the Battlefield: Gallian Chronicles (PS3) as Faldio Landzaat
- Virtua Fighter series as Lei-Fei
- Wand of Fortune as Julius Fortner
- WarTech: Senko no Ronde as Mika Mikli
- White Knight Chronicles as Shapur
- World of Final Fantasy as Cloud Strife
- Zegapain NOT as Toga Dupe
- Zegapain XOR as Toga Vital

== Dubbing roles ==
=== Live-action ===
Title	Role	Dubbing actor	Notes
Twilight	Edward Cullen	Robert Pattinson	
The Twilight Saga: New Moon	Edward Cullen	Robert Pattinson	
The Twilight Saga: Eclipse	Edward Cullen	Robert Pattinson	
The Twilight Saga: Breaking Dawn – Part 1	Edward Cullen	Robert Pattinson	
The Twilight Saga: Breaking Dawn – Part 2	Edward Cullen	Robert Pattinson	
Cosmopolis	Eric Packer	Robert Pattinson	
Maps to the Stars	Jerome Fontana	Robert Pattinson	
The King	The Dauphin	Robert Pattinson	
The Lighthouse	Ephraim Winslow	Robert Pattinson	
The Devil All the Time	Reverend Preston Teagardin	Robert Pattinson	
Tenet	Neil	Robert Pattinson	
The Batman	Bruce Wayne / Batman	Robert Pattinson	
Around the World in 80 Days	Phileas Fogg	David Tennant	
Cabin Fever	Jeff	Joey Kern	
Chicago Med	Dr. Will Halstead	Nick Gehlfuss	
CSI: Miami	Tommy Chandler	Chris Pine	
The Divine Fury	Yong-hoo	Park Seo-joon	
Driven	Jimmy Bly	Kip Pardue	2005 NTV edition
F4 Thailand: Boys Over Flowers	Ren Renrawin Aira	Jirawat Sutivanichsak	
From Dusk till Dawn: The Series	Richie Gecko	Zane Holtz	
Goal!	Santiago Muñez	Kuno Becker	
Goal II: Living the Dream	Santiago Muñez	Kuno Becker	
Goal III: Taking on the World	Santiago Muñez	Kuno Becker	
Into the Wild	Christopher McCandless	Emile Hirsch	
John Wick: Chapter 2	Santino D'Antonio	Riccardo Scamarcio	
Journey to the West: The Demons Strike Back	Tang Sanzang	Kris Wu	
Kamen Rider: Dragon Knight	Danny Cho/Kamen Rider Axe		
The King's Man	Archie Reid	Aaron Taylor-Johnson	
The Midnight After	Yau Tsi-chi	Wong You-nam	
Nowhere Boy	John Lennon	Aaron Taylor-Johnson	
Pee Mak	Ter		
Piranha 3D	Jake Forrester	Steven R. McQueen	
Power Rangers Mystic Force	Nick Russell/Red Mystic Ranger	Firass Dirani	
The Prince & Me	Edvard, Crown Prince of Denmark	Luke Mably	
The Reader	Michael Berg (young)	David Kross	
Roots	Kunta Kinte	Malachi Kirby	
The Roundup: Punishment	Baek Chang-ki	Kim Mu-yeol	
Shazam!	Super Pedro	D. J. Cotrona	
Shazam! Fury of the Gods	Super Pedro	D. J. Cotrona	
Silicon Valley	Richard Hendricks	Thomas Middleditch	
Staged	David Tennant		

=== Animation ===
Title	Role	Notes
Bionicle: The Legend Reborn	Metus	
Castlevania	Hector	
Jurassic World Camp Cretaceous	Mitch	
Link Click	Lu Guang/Hikaru	
The Emoji Movie	Gene	
Pleasant Goat and Big Big Wolf	Pleasant Goat	
Transformers Animated	Blurr	
