= Mira Shelub =

Polish Jewish Resistance fighter (1922–2024)

Mira Shelub (January 13, 1922 – December 30, 2024) was a Polish Jewish Resistance fighter. She fought against German forces on the eastern front of the second World War as part of a partisan group led by her husband. She also co-wrote a memoir about her experience in the resistance titled Never the Last Road (2015).

== Early life ==
Shelub was born in Zdzieciol, Poland, on January 13, 1922 to Chaim and Chana Raznov. She had one sister, Sara, and one brother, Moris. Chaim Raznov owned a clothing store and was also an insurance broker for a company that he owned, while Shelub's mother Chana often helped her father with his businesses. She went to a Jewish school and later attended a Gymnasium in Vilna on a scholarship. Following the Nazi Soviet Non-Aggression Pact of 1939, Vilna became a part of Lithuania, and Shelub was forced to change schools and learn Russian. When Germany invaded the area in 1939, she was forced to return home.

In 1941, she and her family were forced to live in the Zdziedciol Ghetto (also known as the Dzyatlava Ghetto), in the town of Dzyatlava, in what is now Western Belarus. The family spent some time here until they eventually escaped into the Lipiczany forest and joined a local partisan group.

== Partisan resistance ==
Following her escape from Zdziedciol following German invasion, Shelub began supporting a partisan group led by Norman (Nochum) Shelub, her future husband. Her work largely involved supporting the partisan unit through cooking, cleaning, and general support infrastructure to the partisan group's militant unit. On one noted occasion, Shelub was responsible for carrying ammunition for her husband's machine gun into an active combat zone. It was reported that across her unit, roughly one quarter of the individuals were women. The initial partisan group she joined was a mixed group of eastern European fighters, some of whom expressed antisemitic views. Due to this, Norman led a separate group of partisan fighters who he coordinated efforts for with Russian colleagues.

Their unit would engage in acts of sabotage against German peasants, supply lines, and communication networks. Much of their fighting was built around guerilla warfare, where they would often retreat back to the forests. Shelub spoke on this experience:

"The trees, the sky, the pine-needle ground were our summer home. The underground hut was our winter home. We're dealing with friendly and unfriendly peasants. The friendly peasant supported us with food and with ammunition. The unfriendly peasant had no choice. We would get in at night, pick up the prepared food orders that were prepared for the Germans, and leave receipts: 'The partisans were here.'"

During her time fighting within the partisan resistance, the local police attacked the area where the family was staying and Mira's mother was killed. Despite surviving the Nazi occupation, her father would fall ill and die following the Soviet liberation of the area.

== Later life and death ==
Following the 1944 liberation of her land, Shelub would go on to stay within a displaced persons' camp in Bad Gastein, Austria. After the war, they would go on to immigrate to the United States while Shelub's siblings remained in Europe. Prior to this, Mira and Norman would get married within their homeland. Mira and Norman would initially immigrate to New Rochelle, New York, until they made a final move to San Francisco, where Norman's family had settled. It was here that Shelub would give birth to their children: Irwin, Mark, and Elaine. Over the next few decades, Shelub would continue to support her husband through their restaurant in San Francisco.

In 1977, following complications from a heart surgery, Norman Shelub died. Despite this, Shelub's children convinced her to go back and complete her studies, where she earned a bachelor's in 1988 and a master's degree in 1994 from San Francisco State University. She would complete her master's in counseling.

Shelub died December 30, 2024, at the age of 102.

== Works ==
- Never the Last Road, Lehrhaus Judaica and JFCS Press, 2015.
