= Maria Armanda =

Portuguese child singing sensation

Armanda Maria De Jesus Lopes, better known as Maria Armanda, is a former Portuguese child singing sensation. She was 5 years old when she topped the charts in 1981 with her single "Eu vi um sapo".

In 1979 she was invited to participate in the First Gala Internacional dos Pequenos Cantores da Figueira da Foz. She won the competition by singing the song “Eu vi um sapo", a song written by César Batalha Carvalho. She later launched a single entitled Coro Infantil de Santo Amaro de Oeiras.

The song was chosen to represent Portugal, in Bologna, in the 1980 edition of the Zecchino d'Oro, a festival of little known songs with profits going to the well-known charity UNICEF, with Armanda Maria emerging victorious with a song entitled "Ho visto un rospo", which was an Italian-version of the song “Eu vi um sapo". She released the record “Eu vi um sapo”, which features some participation of the Piccolo dell'Antoniano Choir.

In 1981 she continued her career with the launching of two new singles, entitled “Escola é vida (School Is Life)” and “Balão Azul" (Blue Balloon)”.

In 1986 she released yet another song, entitled “Mãe tens razão", before ending her career.

After her musical career was finished, she began presenting a program at a local radio station.

== Discography ==
- "Eu vi um sapo" ( I saw a frog) (Single, Vadeca, 1980)
- "Escola é vida" (School is life) /Balão Azul (Blue Balloon)(Single, Vadeca, 1981)
- "Maria Armanda (A Kikas)" (Album)
- "Mãe tens razão" (Mum you are Right) - (Single, CBS, 1986)

In 1991 a new CD album was released under the title "SIMPLESMENTE", with 16 fados. Its recordlabel : Discosete, CD 817000. On this album Maria Armanda sings no children's songs anymore, but real fados.
