= Gertrud Nüsken =

German chess player

Personal information
- Born: 21 December 1917 Saxony-Anhalt, Germany
- Died: 14 August 1972 (aged 54) Königs Wusterhausen, Germany

Chess career
- Country: Germany

Gertrud Nüsken (née Fröhlich; 21 December 1917 – 14 August 1972) was a German chess player who four times won East Germany Women's Chess Championships (1948, 1950, 1953, 1955). She died in the Interflug plane crash near Königs Wusterhausen.

== Life ==
Gertrud Nüsken was a mathematician. She worked in wagon construction as a structural engineer. Until his death, she was married to Friedrich “Fritz” Nüsken (1914–1970), the chief structural engineer at Waggonbau Görlitz Corporation, who in 1958 received the National Prize of the German Democratic Republic in second class for science and technology for the development of the articulated double-decker wagon.

== Chess successes ==
Gertrud Nüsken learned to play chess from her husband in 1946. Just two years later, in 1948 in Bad Doberan she won the 1. German women's championship 1948 in the Soviet occupation zone of Germany. She also was GDR Women's Chess Champion three times.

Other her top places in East Germany Women's Chess Championship were:

- in 1949 at 3rd place in Bad Klosterlausnitz, which Mira Kremer won,
- in 1950 shared 1st place with Edith Keller before Mira Kremer in Sömmerda,
- in 1951 at 2nd place behind Mira Kremer in Schwerin,
- in 1952 at 3rd place behind Edith Keller-Herrmann and Mira Kremer in Schwerin,
- in 1953 at 1st place in front of Mira Kremer in Weißenfels,
- in 1954 at 3rd place in Bad Saarow, which Ursula Höroldt won,
- in 1955 at 1st place in front of Ruth Landmesser and Mira Kremer in Zwickau.

In 1954 Gertrud Nüsken took part in the Women's European Zonal Chess tournament. In 1955 she retired from tournament chess.

== Miscellaneous ==
In 1959, Gertrud Nüsken won a film idea competition. The successful DEFA comedy movie Papas neue Freundin (Papa's new girlfriend) was made from her story.
