= List of Magi: The Labyrinth of Magic characters =

Some of the characters, including the three main protagonists (from center left to right): Morgiana, Aladdin, and Alibaba Saluja; Sinbad (upper center), and the Eight Generals of Sindria (from left to center right): Spartos Leoxses, Yamraiha, Pisti (front), Hinahoho, Drakon, Sharrkan Amun-Ra, Ja'far, and Masrur (top); Hakuryuu Ren, Kougyoku Ren, Seishun Ri, Hakuei Ren (left), Judar (above), and Koubun Ka (oval shape)

The Japanese manga series Magi: The Labyrinth of Magic features an extensive cast of characters created by Shinobu Ohtaka. The story borrows elements and character names from the One Thousand and One Nights.

The series focuses on a Magi (a rare class of magicians) named Aladdin and his King Vessel (a Magi's chosen one), Alibaba Saluja. They both travel through a world full of magic, which contain mysterious dungeons full of Djinn, treasures, metal vessels, vast countries, various mysteries, and pasts to be unfolded.

The prequel series, Magi: Adventure of Sinbad (illustrated by Yoshifumi Ohtera), focuses on Sinbad and his early life where he captures his seven dungeons, the start of his trading company, the creation of Sindria, and recruiting his Eight Generals.

== Main characters ==
Aladdin (アラジン, Arajin)
Voiced by: Kaori Ishihara (Japanese); Erica Mendez (English)
Aladdin is a young Magi, a rare wizard of creation who carries the Djinn Ugo within his flute. As one of only three Magi who typically exist at any time, he later proves to be both a fourth Magi and the son of King Solomon. He journeys to find other Djinn vessels while unknowingly working to prevent the world's destruction. Unlike ordinary magicians, he draws unlimited Magoi from the Rukh, though this ability leaves him with an insatiable appetite. His turban unfolds into a magic carpet, and his flute allows him to manifest Ugo's physical form. After befriending Alibaba Saluja, Aladdin aids him in conquering the dungeon Amon. When Ugo is destroyed, Aladdin inherits the Wisdom of Solomon (ソロモンの知恵, Soromon no Chie), gaining the ability to commune with the dead. He later battles the dark Magi Judar and infiltrates Magnostadt Academy to investigate its ties to Al-Thamen. During the Reim Empire's invasion, he intervenes to minimize casualties. At a global summit, Aladdin reveals the fate of the lost world Alma Torran. Following Hakuryuu Ren's killing of Alibaba, Aladdin resolves to revive him. In the final battle, he allies with former enemies to stop Sinbad and David, succeeding only after Sinbad's sacrifice.
Alibaba Saluja (アリババ・サルージャ, Aribaba Sarūja)
Voiced by: Yūki Kaji (Japanese); Erik Scott Kimerer (English)
Alibaba Saluja rises from poverty to become Balbadd's third prince through determined training. After his childhood friend Cassim's palace fire kills his father, he departs Balbadd and later allies with Aladdin to conquer the Amon dungeon. Using its treasures, he overthrows Qishan's ruler and frees slaves including Morgiana. Returning to Balbadd, he peacefully transitions the kingdom into a republic through the Fog Troupe, though it falls under Kou Empire control. He hones his combat skills under Sharrkan and in Reim's colosseum, mastering Djinn Equip by combining his magoi with Cassim's remnants. Hakuryuu Ren kills Alibaba during Magnostadt's conflict, but he revives three years later with greater power. He subsequently collaborates with Kougyoku Ren to stabilize Kou's economy while countering Sinbad's schemes. In the final battle, he reunites with Aladdin to defeat both Sinbad and David, ultimately marrying Morgiana.
Morgiana (モルジアナ, Morujiana)
Voiced by: Haruka Tomatsu (Japanese); Cristina Vee (English)
Morgiana, a red-haired Fanalis descendant, possesses the superhuman strength, speed and senses characteristic of her warrior tribe. Initially withdrawn due to traumatic enslavement, she develops deep loyalty to liberators Aladdin and Alibaba. She trains rigorously under fellow Fanalis warrior Masrur, mastering combat techniques that utilize her natural abilities. Her signature weapon, the Amol Selseira, transforms her former slave shackles into enchanted chain weapons empowered by the Djinn Amon. After journeying to the Dark Continent to reconnect with her heritage while maintaining human form through Aladdin's magic, she ultimately marries Alibaba and resists Sinbad's mass manipulation of humanity.

== Alliance of Seven Seas ==
Several small nations united by a couple of multilateral treaties including a mutual protection agreement. After the battle of Magnostadt, the Alliance joins forces with the Reim Empire, and helps Hakuryuu's faction win against Kouen's during the Kou Empire Civil War, earning their support as well, effectively establishing ties of trust with all the world's major powers, leading to the foundation of the "International Alliance", which spans almost every nation in the world, and abolishes slavery, conscription, as well as adopting a single currency and allowing its citizens to travel freely inside its territory.

=== Sindria Kingdom ===
Sindria Kingdom (シンドリア王国, Shindoria Ōkoku), or rather the Second Kingdom of Sindria, is an island country located in the southern seas. Its realms lie in extreme south of the region that northern mapmakers had labeled 'uncivilized'. These islands were isolated until King Sinbad developed them. The 'City of Dreams' has become known around the world as home of the 'Legendary Dungeon Capturer' attracts many visitors. The islands teem with people, animals and plants not seen in the northern continents due to their unusual topography and climates. As a result, the country has become prosperous through trade and tourism. It was established after the original Kingdom of Sindria established by Sinbad and his companions was invaded and destroyed by Parthevia.

Sinbad (シンドバッド, Shindobaddo)
Voiced by: Daisuke Ono (Japanese); Matt Mercer (English)
Sinbad is the King of Sindria and the leader of the Alliance of the Seven Seas. Born in Parthevia, he first conquered a dungeon (Baal) at the age of 14, and eventually captured six more, becoming the "Master of Seven Djinn". His achievements led the Djinn to prohibit him from further dungeon conquests. One such dungeon was created by Judar without authorization, which Sinbad conquered to impede Al-Thamen's plans. Following the meeting with Aladdin's group during the trade negotiations in Balbadd, he escorts them to Sindria for the purposes of protection and training. Sinbad, a master of Magoi manipulation trained by Yambala Gladiators, resisted corruption after absorbing massive amounts of Black Rukh from fallen Parthevians. His enigmatic nature and undisclosed ambitions have led allies like Yunan to exercise caution regarding his true intentions. He is in command of the Eight Generals of Sindria, a select group of highly trained warriors who were recruited during his travels. It is later revealed that Sinbad hosts the Rukh of David—founder of Alma Torran's Orthodox Magicians and grandfather to Aladdin. He serves as protagonist in the prequel spin-off series Adventure of Sinbad.

==== Eight Generals of Sindria ====
Ja'far (ジャーファル, Jāfaru)
Voiced by: Takahiro Sakurai (Japanese); Lucien Dodge (English)
Formerly the leader of a clan of assassins hired to kill Sinbad, his loyalty towards him is so high that he will approach with a murderous intent anyone who insults him, although he is usually worried by Sinbad's antics. He usually only wears official clothing as he only has one set of normal clothing he received from Sinbad when he was 14, which he has since outgrown. He uses the weapon household's vessel 'Valalark Sei' created from one of his killing tools from his former trade, making of him the first Household Member of Sinbad's court. Unlike the other generals who return to their home countries after the establishment of the International Alliance, Ja'far stays by Sinbad's side as his personal assistant.
Hinahoho (ヒナホホ)
Voiced by: Keiji Fujiwara (Japanese); Tony Oliver (English)
One of the Imuchak Warriors of the Extreme North's Unexplored Region. When he first meets Sinbad, he still had not a name as he was struggling to complete his ceremony of age. Sinbad helps him to complete the ceremony, but ashamed for failing to do so by himself, Hinahoho enters the dungeon Valefor to prove his worth and is almost killed when Sinbad steps in to save him. After Sinbad claims Valefor, Hinahoho becomes his comrade, and helps him found his trading company. His lance eventually becomes the household vessel 'Galfor Roromus'. After the establishment of the International Alliance, Hinahoho assumes Rametoto's place as the king of Imuchak and becomes a grandfather.
Masrur (マスルール, Masurūru)
Voiced by: Yoshimasa Hosoya (Japanese); Keith Silverstein (English)
A Fanalis like Morgiana who becomes her trainer in hand to hand combat, Sinbad first met him as one of Maader's slaves, helping him to obtain freedom before he joins his side. He does not speak a lot usually and is seen as emotionless and unfriendly, but his behavior sometimes shows the opposite. Although he is given a private room, he is often seen outside. He uses the weapon household's vessel 'Balalark Kauza'. After the establishment of the International Alliance, Masrur leaves Sindria and settles in Reim.
Yamraiha (ヤムライハ, Yamuraiha)
Voiced by: Yui Horie (Japanese); Elizabeth Thomas (English)
A sorceress from Magnostadt specialized in water magic. She takes Aladdin as her apprentice by Sinbad's request. Because of her fondness and pride for magic, she often gets into fights with Sharrkan, who takes more pride on his swordsmanship. Because she will become so nervous that she will only talk about topics regarding magic with the person she is interested in, Pisti suggested her to 'just date a guy who can use magic'. Yamraiha is the adopted daughter of Matal Mogamett, and leaves his side upon disagreeing with his methods, eventually meeting Sinbad and helping him to control the excess of Magoi in his body. She eventually reconciles with her foster father just before he dies thanks to Aladdin's help. Unlike the other generals, she does not use a household vessel as its powers usually interfere with her magic. After the establishment of the International Alliance, Yamraiha returns to Magnostadt and assumes Mogamett's place as the headmaster.
Sharrkan Amun-Ra (シャルルカン・アメン・ラー, Sharurukan Amen Rā)
Voiced by: Showtaro Morikubo (Japanese); Danny Boston (English)
An exiled prince from Heliohapt's royal family, Sharrkan is the swordsman of the group, becoming Alibaba's teacher upon Sinbad's request. His optimistic personality changes into a violent personality during sword practice. Because of his extreme fondness for fencing, he often gets into fights with Yamuraiha who claims that magic is far more useful. After the establishment of the International Alliance, Sharrkan assumes his brother's place as the king of Heliohapt.
Drakon (ドラコーン, Dorakōn)
Voiced by: Tomokazu Sugita (Japanese); Patrick Seitz (English)
Originally known as Dragul Nor Henrius Govius Menudias Partenuvonomias Dumid Os Kartanon (ドラグル・ノル・ヘンリウス・ゴビアス・メヌディアス・パルテヌボノミアス・ドゥミド・オウス・コルタノーン, Doraguru Noru Henriusu Gobiasu Menudiasu Parutenubonomiasu Dumido Ousu Korutanōn), he was nicknamed Drakon by Sinbad. He is a former general and noble of the Parthevia Empire and was the first of the generals who met him, as he was drafting him to join his expedition to conquer Baal. Owner of the household vessel 'Balalark Barasheekh', he turns into a dragon-like creature after being mortally wounded by his brother, suffering a process called "Assimilation", that allows a Household Member to bring out the full power of his vessel, but losing his human form in the process. After the establishment of the International Alliance, Drakon assumes Sinbad's place as the king of Sindria.
Pisti (ピスティ, Pisuti)
Voiced by: Rumi Ōkubo (Japanese); Christine Marie Cabanos (English)
The youngest daughter of the queen of Artemyra. Despite being 18 years old, she looks much younger, and has a complex about her child-like body. Her only female friend is Yamraiha. Although she is good at pretending to cry, she says it no longer works on Ja'far. Her special skills include communicating with and charming animals using her music. After the establishment of the International Alliance, Pisti assumes her mother's place as the queen of Artemyra.
Spartos Leoxses (スパルトス・レオクセス, Suparutosu Reokusesu)
Voiced by: Wataru Hatano (Japanese); Sam Riegel (English)
Originally a prince from Sasan, he fights using a lance. He is the younger brother of Mystras, another member of Sinbad's household who was killed in the war against Parthevia, and joined the generals after his death. After the establishment of the International Alliance, Spartos assumes his father's place as the king of Sasan.
Mystras Leoxses (ミストラス・レオクセス, Misutorasu Reokusesu)
Voiced by: Wataru Hatano (Japanese); Robbie Daymond (English)
Prince of Sasan and Spartos' older brother. Inspired by Sinbad's stories and eager to see the outside world, he refused to follow his father's footsteps and was sentenced to fight the country's knights one on one to earn his freedom, but after defeating all his comrades, he is forced to fight his own father in a bout to the death. After Sinbad saves him and defeats his father, he starts traveling the world with Sinbad and company. His lance eventually becomes the household vessel 'Bararaq Harba'. He is killed when Parthevia invades and destroys the original Kingdom of Sindria, and Spartos assumes his place as Sinbad's comrade in his honor.

=== Imuchak ===
Rametoto (ラメトト)
Voiced by: Hiroshi Naka (Japanese); Kyle Hebert (English)
The Imuchak Warriors' Clan Chief and Hinahoho's father-in-law, he owns the Djinn Forneus. He becomes Sinbad's first business partner and ally in the creation of his company. He later relinquishes his title to Hinahoho and joins the board of directors of the International Alliance
Rurumu (ルルム)
Voiced by: Ayumi Tsunematsu (Japanese); Wendee Lee (English)
Rametoto's daughter and Hinahoho's wife, she is as strong and muscular as her husband and has several children with him. While being one of Sinbad's retainers, she was a strict teacher to him and Ja'far, handling with their education on mathematics, language, geography and etiquette among other subjects. She is killed when Parthevia invades and destroys the original Kingdom of Sindria.
Pipirika (ピピリカ)
Voiced by: Ayumi Fujimura (Japanese); Reba Buhr (English)
Hinahoho's little sister. She and her brother first meet Sinbad when they are struggling to complete his ceremony of age. After the establishment of the International Alliance, she becomes Ja'far's secretary.

=== Sasan ===
Darius Leoxses (ダリオス・レオクセス, Dariosu Reokusesu)
Voiced by: Kenyu Horiuchi (Japanese); Jalen K. Cassell (English)
The Knight King of Sasan, He is Spartos and Mystras' father. While at first he wanted to keep his country away from the influence of the outside world, after being defeated by Sinbad and understanding that the power of the Djinn is not unique, he agreed on letting Mystras travel with Sinbad, also becoming his ally. He later relinquishes the throne to Spartos and joins the board of directors of the International Alliance. His Djinn Alloces is capable of reflecting enemy attacks back to them. It is contained within his spear.

=== Heliohapt ===
Sphintus Carmen (スフィントス・カーメン, Sufintosu Kāmen)
Voiced by: Ryota Ohsaka (Japanese); Bobby Thong (English)
Sphintus is a student at the Magnostadt Academy and Aladdin's roommate. He is originally from Heliohapt, and a member of its royal family, like Sharrkan. He specializes in Healing Magic.
Armakan Amun-Ra (アールマカン・アメン・ラー, Ārumakan Amen Rā)
Voiced by: Hidenobu Kiuchi
King of Heliohapt and Sharrkan's older brother, he owns the Djinn Vassago. He later relinquishes the throne to his younger brother and joins the board of directors of the International Alliance.

=== Artemyra ===
Mira Dianus Artemina (ミラ・ディアノス・アルテミーナ, Mira Dianosu Arutemīna)
Voiced by: Yumi Tōma (Japanese); Michelle Ruff (English)
The warrior queen of Artemyra and mother of Pisti. Known for her deep mistrust of men, she initially sentenced Sinbad and his companions to death after his romantic advances. When Sinbad returned to reclaim his metal vessels, she engaged him in combat. Following her defeat, Mira allied with Sinbad, establishing trade relations and later joining the International Alliance's board of directors after abdicating in favor of her daughter. Her Djinn Cerberus grants her triple-headed transformation with mastery over lightning, ice, and fire elemental attacks.

=== Kina ===
Yamato Takeruhiko (倭 健彦, Yamato Takeruhiko)
King of Kina and a dungeon capturer who first appears supporting Hakuryuu Ren's forces during the Kou Empire's civil war. A vocal opponent of the International Alliance's formation, he later relocates his entire nation to the Dark Continent through Hakuryuu's Zagan Djinn abilities. His Djinn Caim grants him exceptional precision, enabling devastating long-range attacks that strike targets with unerring accuracy.
Nanaumi (ナナウミ)
Yamato's aid and his contact with Hakuryuu.

== Kou Empire ==
The Kou Empire (煌帝国, Kō Teikoku) was originally a small, fragmented country in the Far East that grew to the central plains into a powerful nation which intends to conquer the entire world. Their method of expansion involves sending dungeon capturers to invade bordering countries. Its history, culture, and architecture resembles those of early Imperial China. Following a civil war after Empress Gyokuen is murdered, the Kou Empire declines in power once the International Alliance is established, as it could not cope neither with the abolishment of slavery nor with the competition with other nations in trade and tourism.

=== Royal Family ===
Hakuryuu Ren (練 白龍, Ren Hakuryū)
Voiced by: Kenshō Ono (Japanese); Darrel Guilbeau (English)
Hakuryuu is the fourth prince of the Kou Empire, bearing a burn scar around his left eye from the fire that killed most of his family. Traumatized by his mother's betrayal, he becomes fiercely self-reliant and hones his skills under his sister Hakuei. During his time in Sindria, he befriends Aladdin's group and conquers a dungeon, gaining Djinn equipment at the cost of his left hand. He later develops feelings for Morgiana, aspiring to prove himself worthy. Returning to the Kou Empire, he allies with Judar, captures a second dungeon, and seizes the throne through civil war. Forced to abdicate, he retreats before returning to oppose Arba.
Hakuei Ren (練 白瑛, Ren Hakuei)
Voiced by: Nana Mizuki (Japanese); Johanna Luis (English)
Hakuei Ren is the first princess of the Kou Empire and general of its western army. Despite facing criticism for her pacifist ideals, she demonstrates her strength by conquering a dungeon. She raises Hakuryuu with an emphasis on self-sufficiency, teaching him practical skills. During the Kou Civil War, she seeks Sinbad's aid for her brother. Afterward, it is revealed that Arba's soul had possessed her, though Aladdin later restores her body through alchemy, purging Arba's influence while ensuring her survival. Her Djinn, Paimon, grants wind-based abilities through her flabellum. She also oversees the integration of Seishun Ri and Kouga Clan forces into her army with Aladdin's help.
Kougyoku Ren (練 紅玉, Ren Kōgyoku)
Voiced by: Kana Hanazawa (Japanese); Kira Buckland (English)
The eighth princess of the Kou Empire. She initially displays antagonistic behavior but develops her first meaningful friendship with Alibaba during her stay in Sindria. Though she promises Sinbad not to use her powers against Sindria, she fears being unable to prevent her siblings' invasion. Her initial infatuation with Sinbad turns to hatred when he manipulates her into betraying her brothers to support Hakuryuu's unified Kou Empire. Following Hakuryuu's abdication, she ascends as the fifth empress but struggles to govern until Alibaba arrives to assist. Her Djinn Vinea, embodiment of sorrow and isolation, grants water manipulation abilities and resides in her hair ornament, also empowering the household vessel of Koubun Ka.
Kouen Ren (練 紅炎, Ren Kōen)
Voiced by: Yuichi Nakamura (Japanese); Kaiji Tang (English)
First prince of the Kou Empire and its most formidable general. He commands three Djinn—a distinction shared only with Sinbad, Hakuryuu, and Barbarossa. His ambition to unify the world under imperial rule stems from a deeper desire to uncover the world's hidden truths. Leading four dungeon monsters as his personal commanders, Kouen encourages but never forces his siblings' participation in his plans. Following Gyokuen's death and the empire's division, his faction loses the subsequent civil war when the Alliance of Seven Seas supports Hakuryuu. In a final act of compassion after his defeat, Kouen magically replaces Hakuryuu's lost limbs with his own before accepting banishment, with official records falsely reporting his execution.
Koumei Ren (練 紅明, Ren Kōmei)
Voiced by: Satoshi Hino (Japanese); Ethan Murray (English)
Second prince of the Kou Empire and one of its three generals. He initially served as governor of Balbadd following its annexation. After being banished with brothers Kouen and Kouha following their faction's defeat in the Kou Civil War, he secretly returns to assist Alibaba in restoring the empire's finances—a mission requiring his anonymity under Sinbad's terms. His Djinn Dantalion commands spatial magic, employing teleportation to exploit enemy vulnerabilities and turn opposing forces against each other. The Djinn's teleportation gates feature distinctive Big Dipper insignias.
Kouha Ren (練 紅覇, Ren Kōha)
Voiced by: Tetsuya Kakihara (Japanese); Mark Allen Jr. (English)
Kou Empire's third prince and a dungeon capturer like his brothers. He presents an androgynous appearance contrasting with his ruthless battlefield persona. As Magnostadt envoy, he first meets Aladdin while demanding Mogamett's surrender. His household uniquely comprises societal outcasts—disfigured experiment victims, disgraced clan members, and reformed criminals—whose unwavering loyalty stems from his unprejudiced acceptance despite court disapproval. After Reim's failed Magnostadt invasion, his opportunistic occupation attempt is thwarted by Mogamett's dark Djinn until rescued by Alibaba and Kouen. Following his faction's civil war defeat, he faces banishment with his brothers. His Djinn Leraje, acquired with Kouen's assistance, resides in a transforming sword-scythe capable of unleashing the devastating area attack "Lerazzo Madraga".
Hakutoku Ren (練 白徳, Ren Hakutoku)
The first emperor and founder of the Kou Empire who united smaller warring states into a single nation. He is the father of Hakuei and Hakuryuu and two other sons who died in a fire with him under strange circumstances. According to Hakuryuu, his death was orchestrated by his wife, Gyokuen, with the help of Al-Thamen.
Koutoku Ren (練 紅徳, Ren Kōtoku)
The second emperor of the Kou Empire who assumed the throne after the death of his brother Hakutoku and then married his former empress, Gyokuen. He is the father of Kouen, Koumei, Kouha and Kougyoku. He officially named his wife to succeed him on his deathbed, a move seen as suspicious by some members of the Royal court.

=== Household Members ===
Seishun Ri (李 青舜, Ri Seishun)
Voiced by: Asami Seto (Japanese); Julie Ann Taylor (English)
Hakuei's old acquaintance and assistant who had captured a dungeon with her. His household's vessel is 'Double Moon Swords'. He gets along well with Hakuryuu and trains with him. He is annoyed that Hakuryuu grew taller than him.
Koubun Ka (夏 黄文, Ka Kōbun)
Voiced by: Kenichi Suzumura (Japanese); Vic Mignogna (English)
Kougyoku's assistant who has accompanied her since they were young. He is a cunning individual who planned to take control of Balbadd by manipulating the heir to the throne that would be born from the princess' marriage with King Abhmad. When that marriage fell through, he later planned to create a scandal involving Kougyoku and Sinbad and so force their marriage, but this scheme was foiled when Yamraiha proved Sinbad's innocence. Despite his machinations Kougyoku forgave him and allowed him to remain in her household. His household vessel allows him to heal others with water magic.

== Balbadd ==
Balbadd is a coastal nation bordering the Kou Empire, Reim Empire, and Sindria Kingdom, sharing cultural parallels with the ancient Middle East. Ruled by a monarchy for 23 generations, it is eventually dissolved and annexed by the Kou Empire. Following Hakuryuu's rebellion and the division of Kou, Balbadd becomes the Western Kou Empire's capital under Kouen's rule until its conquest by the Alliance of Seven Seas. After the International Alliance's formation, Balbadd regains independence and transitions into a parliamentary republic.

Rashid Saluja (ラシッド・サルージャ, Rashiddo Sarūja)
Voiced by: Hiroshi Tsuchida
Alibaba's father and the 22nd king of Balbadd who died soon after appointing Alibaba as his successor. He was also a friend of Sinbad and sponsored a number of his endeavors once he found him to be reliable. He once presented a valuable sword to Sinbad, who in return passed on to Alibaba to serve as Amon's current metal vessel.
Ahbmad Saluja (アブマド・サルージャ, Abumado Sarūja)
Voiced by: Kouki Miyata (Japanese); Sam Riegel (English)
The 23rd king of Balbadd and Alibaba's half-brother. His gullible nature and lack of political acumen allows the Kou Empire to easily manipulate him. His bad management leaves Balbadd heavily indebted to the Empire and, in a last effort to save the country's economy, and since he thinks of most of his citizens as trash, he decides to establish a slave market in Balbadd where the people of the slums are to be sold to other countries. After the monarchy is dissolved, both Abhmad and his brother Sahbmad are given asylum at Sinbad's request and become researchers of the ancient Torran language and culture.
Sahbmad Saluja (サブマド･サルージャ, Sabumado Sarūja)
Voiced by: Hirofumi Nojima (Japanese); Tony Oliver (English)
Alibaba's other half-brother and the viceroy of Balbadd. Upon learning of his older brother's plan to sell the people as slaves, Sahbmad takes a stand and joins Alibaba's effort to stop him.
Anise Saluja (アニス・サルージャ, Anisu Sarūja)
Voiced by: Eimi Okada
Alibaba's mother. Before she became a harlot, Anise was a maid in Balbadd Palace, where she caught the king's eye and conceived Alibaba. The circumstances of her fall from the palace to the slums are not revealed, but she was happy with her life looking after her son. She took Cassim and his sister in after the death of their father and upon her death, Alibaba was taken to the palace by his father.
Cassim (カシム, Kashimu)
Voiced by: Jun Fukuyama (Japanese); Sean Chiplock (English)
Cassim, leader of the Fog Troupe (霧の団, Kiri no Dan), is Alibaba's childhood friend from the Balbadd slums. After their parents' deaths, he and his sister Mariam are adopted by Alibaba's mother. Cassim kills his abusive father to protect Mariam but later hides her death in a slum epidemic from Alibaba. Using Alibaba's knowledge of palace tunnels, he robs the royal treasury, indirectly causing the king's death. When Alibaba returns, Cassim manipulates him into joining the Fog Troupe, leveraging his royal ties for legitimacy. Rejecting Alibaba's peaceful reforms, Cassim incites rebellion and transforms into a dark Djinn using a black metal vessel. Aladdin intervenes with Solomon's Wisdom, allowing their reconciliation before Cassim dies, his Magoi passing to Alibaba. He wields the Sword of the Black Binding Fog (黒縛霧の剣, Kurobaku Kiri no Ken).
Zaynab (ザイナブ, Zainabu)
Voiced by: Akeno Watanabe (Japanese); Karen Strassman (English)
One of the cadre of the 'Fog Troupe'. She uses the magical weapon 'Sword of the Scarlet Delusional Fog'. Later she marries Hassan and has a child with him.
Hassan (ハッサン, Hassan)
Voiced by: Teruyuki Tanzawa (Japanese); Patrick Seitz (English)
One of the cadre of the 'Fog Troupe'. He wears a patch over his left eye and uses the weapon 'Sword of the Yellow Corrosive Fog'. He later becomes Zaynab's husband.

== Reim Empire ==
Having many similarities with the historical Roman Empire and extending for most of the western territory, it is one of the two most powerful nations in the world, the other being the Kou Empire, both aiming for global domination. Once the International Alliance is established, the Reim Empire opts to not join it, but adopts some of its policies, like the abolishment of slavery.

Scheherazade (シェヘラザード, Sheherazādo)
Voiced by: Maaya Sakamoto (Japanese); Stephanie Sheh (English)
Scheherazade serves as the Reim Empire's High Priestess and Magi, having guided its rise to power by selecting Pernadius Alexius as its first King Vessel over 250 years prior. Though appearing as a young woman, this form is merely a proxy clone, while her true aged body remains hidden with limited lifespan. She expends her remaining life force to restore the Magoi of Alibaba and the Kou royal family, enabling their crucial role in weakening Magnostadt's Black Rukh for Aladdin's final dispelling. Following the conflict, her spirit designates Titus as her successor, transferring her powers and knowledge to facilitate his reincarnation as Reim's new Magi.
Titus Alexius (ティトス・アレキウス, Titosu Arekiusu)
Voiced by: Yoshitsugu Matsuoka (Japanese); Johnny Yong Bosch (English)
Titus, a clone created by Scheherazade, infiltrates Magnostadt as a student, befriending Aladdin's group. When Mogamett discovers his origin, he refuses to return him, prompting Reim's invasion. After Aladdin stops the conflict, Titus learns his lifespan is tied to Scheherazade's. He sacrifices himself to weaken Mogamett's corruption, enabling his allies to intervene. Revived by Ugo, Titus becomes Reim's new Magi, inheriting Scheherazade's powers and knowledge.
Mu Alexius (ムー・アレキウス, Mū Arekiusu)
Voiced by: Mamoru Miyano (Japanese); Ben Pronsky (English)
Captain of Reim's elite Fanalis Corps and one of the empire's three dungeon capturers. He is regarded as its greatest warrior. Though only half-Fanalis and physically weaker than pureblood counterparts, he leads the assault on Magnostadt until halted by Aladdin and Alibaba, later joining them to contain the dark medium's destruction. He reveals to Morgiana that Fanalis are not truly human—a truth discovered when he crossed the great rift without Yunan's guidance. Like his father, Mu decided to keep his Djinn in order to protect the empire from an eventual attack from Nerva. Contained in his sword, Barbatos transforms into a trident when fully equipped, granting long-range shockwave attacks. This power comes with risk, as Mu and his subordinates' Fanalis physiology limits their Magoi reserves.
Nerva Julius Caluades (ネルヴァ・ユリウス・カルアデス, Neruva Yuriusu Karuadesu)
Voiced by: Hiroki Matsukawa
Son of the Reim Emperor and one of the Empire's three Dungeon Capturers. Owner of the Djinn Shax, he was the only among Reim's Dungeon Capturers who had not mastered his Djinn Equip during the battle against Il Illah's medium. Once the International Alliance is established, Nerva refuses to abdicate from his Imperial privileges and, possibly under influence from other nobles, decides to defy Sinbad's decree to lay down all Metal Vessels and disappears without a trace, becoming a potential threat to Reim's political stability and forcing both Mu and his father to keep his Djinn as well in order to prepare against an eventual attack from him.
Ignatius Alexius (イグナティウス・アレキウス, Igunatiusu Arekiusu)
Voiced by: Kanehira Yamamoto
Supreme commander of the army. As one of the Empire's three Dungeon Capturers, he is the owner of the Djinn Purson. Like his son, Ignatius decided to keep his Djinn in order to protect the empire from an eventual attack from Nerva.
Myron Alexius (ミュロン・アレキウス, Myuron Arekiusu)
Voiced by: Ayahi Takagaki (Japanese); Sarah Anne Williams (English)
Myron is Mu's little sister and a member of the Fanalis Corps. Just like Lo'lo', she owns a household vessel empowered by her brother's Djinn.
Lo'lo' (ロゥロゥ, Rourou)
Voiced by: Kishô Taniyama (Japanese); Joshua Tomar (English)
Lo'lo' is a member of the Fanalis Corps and owner of household vessel "Bard Kauza". Somehow he lost part of his lips, leaving some teeth always exposed.
Shambal Ramal (シャンバル・ラマー, Shanbaru Ramā)
Voiced by: Masashi Ebara (Japanese); Richard Epcar (English)
Shambal is a member of the Yambala Gladiators, a clan of powerful warriors able to manipulate their Magoi to increase their prowess in battle. He passed his techniques to Sinbad, who lived with the Yambalas for a while and later becomes Alibaba's teacher upon his request.
Toto (トト)
Voiced by: Kana Asumi (Japanese); Cherami Leigh (English)
A young woman member of the Yambala who helps with Alibaba's training. Moved by his compassion and selflessness, she later reunites with Alibaba in Sindria and joins him and Morgiana in his diplomatic travel to Balbadd. She owns a large sword that later becomes a household vessel under Alibaba's Amon and eventually becomes Olba's girlfriend. During the three-year timeskip, they get married and have two children.
Darius (ダライアス, Daraiasu)
An intelligence officer from Reim, he was sent to spy on Parthevia and upon being wounded, he is sheltered by Sinbad's father Badr, unaware of his true identity. During his stay he tells the young Sinbad several stories about the outside world and become close to him, until he is found out and takes Sinbad as a hostage in an attempt to escape and is killed by Badr.

== Magnostadt ==
Magnostadt, formerly the Musta'sim Kingdom, is a magician-ruled state that rapidly expanded through advanced magical research. The nation enforces a caste system where non-magicians live in impoverished slums while having their Magoi drained to power magical tools. Originally supported by Al-Thamen during its revolutionary founding, Magnostadt's magicians developed black metal vessels using black Rukh. The country becomes embroiled in war with both the Reim and Kou Empires seeking to claim it, resulting in widespread destruction. With assistance from the Reim Empire and Alliance of Seven Seas, Magnostadt preserves its independence and abolishes its caste system as citizens unite to rebuild.

Matal Mogamett (マタル・モガメット, Mataru Mogametto)
Voiced by: Chō (Japanese); Steve Kramer (English)
Chancellor of Magnostadt's magic academy. He developed deep animosity toward non-magicians (whom he labels as "Goi") following persecution that claimed his daughter's life. Initially aspiring to use magic for humanity's benefit, his trauma transformed this idealism into belief that only magicians deserved protection. After leading a successful magicians' revolt, his hatred intensified until he viewed Goi as subhuman. When Reim's invasion failed and Kou's forces approached, he unleashed stored Black Rukh to summon endless Dark Djinn, descending into depravity until Aladdin and Yamraiha reached him through Solomon's Wisdom. Realizing his errors, Mogamett's Rukh returned to the Great Flow after begging Aladdin to help his victims find peace. His disciples later entrusted Mogamett's scepter to Aladdin.
Marga (マルガ, Maruga)
Voiced by: Aya Suzaki (Japanese); Brianna Knickerbocker (English)
A sick orphan whose condition went terminal due to the constant drain of Magoi from her body. She is adopted by Titus who grows attached to her and uses his magic to prolong her life. She leaves Magnostadt to live with Titus in Reim after he becomes Scheherazade's successor.
Irene Smirnoff (イレーヌ スミルノフ, Irēnu Sumirunofu)
Voiced by: Megumi Toyoguchi (Japanese); Lauren Landa (English)
A High Class Magician of Magnostadt who teaches Rukh's Properties and Alterations in the academy. She dedicates herself to research the several properties of Black Rukh, but seem to be unaware of the dark secret behind its creation. She has a large admiration on Mogamett, to the point of getting envious of Aladdin when he becomes closer to the chancellor.
Myers (マイヤーズ, Maiyaz)
Voiced by: Kikuko Inoue (Japanese); Laura Post (English)
Myers, the Thunder Whip Magician, is a teacher at the Magnostadt Academy, who helps Aladdin with his remedial classes when he is mistakenly labeled as a dropout due to his inability to generate much Magoi by himself when not assisted by external Rukh. She used to be a magician of the Parthevia Empire like her brother Doron.
Doron (ドロン)
Voiced by: Takuya Matsumoto
Doron is Myers' little brother. He is a magician responsible to enforce order in the 5th level district, where live the unemployed non-magicians of Magnustadt, which represent two-thirds of the city's population, treating them with scorn.

== Parthevia Empire ==
The birthland of Sinbad and his comrade Drakon. It was originally a small and prosperous nation which expanded its territory and influence, increasing its prosperity until getting into difficulties upon facing the much stronger Reim Empire.

Badr (バドﾙ, Badoru)
Voiced by: Katsuyuki Konishi (Japanese); Grant George (English)
Sinbad's father and a war veteran who lost his left leg in combat. Despite being offered a huge sum in reward for his effort in the war and to compensate the loss of his leg, he refuses it instead, claiming that he did nothing worthy of earning it. He used to live peacefully working as a fisherman with his wife and son until the country started losing ground against Reim, and his refusal to take part in the war effort led him to be shunned by his friends and neighbors, who brand him and his family as expatriates. Badr eventually join the war to protect his family but before leaving, he shows his wounded and crippled body claiming it is the only "reward" he got from war. He is then accused of treason and executed.
Esra (エスラ, Esura)
Voiced by: Yōko Hikasa (Japanese); Melissa Fahn (English)
Sinbad's mother was in poor health when her son departed to conquer his first dungeon at the age of 14, equipped with a sword that had been passed down from his father. She dies in her son's arms shortly after his return home. Despite Sinbad's brief stay in Baal, spanning only a few hours, two months had elapsed in the external world.
Serendine Dikumenowlz Du Parthevia (セレンディーネ・ディクメンオウルズ・ドゥ・パルテビア, Serendīne Dikumen'ouruzu Du Parutebia)
Voiced by: Ai Kayano (Japanese); Abby Trott (English)
Serendine, first princess of Parthevia and commander of its army, bears the epithet "Venomous Spider Princess". After her childhood friend Drakon fails to conquer Baal and suffers injury by Sinbad, she vows revenge but is ultimately defeated in battle. Betrothed to Barbarossa until Drakon exposes his treachery, she later proposes marriage to Sinbad during the Zepar dungeon conquest to legitimize his claim to Parthevia's throne. She perishes during Parthevia's destruction of the First Kingdom of Sindria, according to Sinbad's account. Her Djinn Zepar, specializing in spiritual puppetry, initially resides in her sword before transferring to Sinbad when he absorbs her Rukh posthumously.
Barbarossa (バルバロッサ, Barubarossa)
Voiced by: Takehito Koyasu (Japanese); David Vincent (English)
Barbarossa, Drakon's elder brother and a military general, maintains a political engagement to Serendine with Al-Thamen's support. After Drakon fails to conquer the Baal and Valefor dungeons, Barbarossa disowns him and orders his execution. He later mortally wounds Drakon using his Djinn equip, though Drakon survives through assimilation. Barbarossa wields two Djinn: Glasya-Labolas, granting gravity magic through his halberd, and Gusion, enabling tectonic manipulation which he uses to attack Sindria. Sinbad ultimately kills Barbarossa, causing both Djinn to return to their dungeons.

== Al-Thamen ==
The antagonistic organization Al-Thamen (アル・サーメン, Aru Sāmen) has existed since ancient times, operating covertly to spread global chaos through war, famine, and oppression. Their goal is to disrupt the Rukh's guidance, which they believe enslaves humanity to fate. The group infiltrates nations under the guise of assistance, with most members being artificial beings contained within hollow Matryoshka-like vessels. Aladdin reveals Al-Thamen caused Alma Torran's destruction by summoning the corrupt deity Ill Ilah, and now seeks to repeat this in the current world by accumulating Black Rukh. After Sinbad forms the International Alliance, Al-Thamen collaborates with Arba to access the Golden Palace, ostensibly to crown Sinbad as ultimate king but actually to merge him with Ill Ilah.

Arba (アルバ, Aruba)
Voiced by: Miki Itō (Japanese); Erica Lindbeck (English)
Founder and leader of Al-Thamen. She infiltrated the Kou Empire by assuming the identity of Gyokuen Ren (練 玉艶, Ren Gyokuen) through marriage to the first emperor. After orchestrating her husband's death in a fire that also killed Hakuryuu and Hakuei's brothers, she married her brother-in-law and eventually seized the throne. Originally one of Solomon's three Magi, Arba served as his lifelong protector but turned against him when he sought to share divine power equally among all beings. This betrayal led to Alma-Torran's destruction through her creation of Ill Ilah. Though Hakuryuu and Judar seemingly killed her, Arba's spirit survived by possessing Hakuei's body—a transfer made possible through their bloodline connection. Aladdin ultimately defeates her by alchemically altering Hakuei's body to reject Arba's Rukh, forcing it back to its original form.
Judar (ジュダル, Judaru)
Voiced by: Ryōhei Kimura (Japanese); Todd Haberkorn (English)
Judar is a Magi serving as the Kou Empire's oracle under Al-Thamen's direction. Specializing in ice magic, his powers intensify when surrounded by Black Rukh due to his fallen state. Raised by Al-Thamen after they murdered his parents, he initially dismisses this revelation when confronted by Aladdin using the Wisdom of Solomon. However, when facing the Djinn Belial, he admits his true motive is revenge against the world for his suffering. This leads him to betray Al-Thamen and ally with Hakuryuu Ren. After absorbing the Black Rukh from Magnostadt's destroyed medium, Judar gains immense magical power and access to deceased magicians' knowledge, including Mogamett's, enabling continuous learning.
Dunya Musta'sim (ドゥニヤ・ムスタシム, Duniya Musutashimu)
Voiced by: Eriko Nakamura (Japanese); Erika Harlacher (English)
A former princess of the Musta'sim Kingdom, she joins Al-Thamen after her family is killed in a revolution orchestrated by Magnostadt. Specialized in gravity and magnetic magic, she fights along a doll created by her based on her long lost servant Isaac. She ambushes Aladdin and his friends inside Zagan's dungeon and is defeated after becoming a black Djinn with a black metal vessel. Despite Yamraiha's efforts to heal her, Dunya dies soon after by the aftereffects of the transformation.
Isaac (イサアク, Isaaku)
Voiced by: Ryota Takeuchi (Japanese); Liam O'Brien (English)
Isaac was Dunya's servant at the Musta'sim Kingdom who died to protect her during Mogamett's revolution. She later uses her magic to construct a doll resembling him to fight at her side.
Ithnan (イスナーン, Isunān)
Voiced by: Shin-ichiro Miki (Japanese); Marc Diraison (English)
An agent of Al-Thamen who first confronts Aladdin and his friends in the Zagan dungeon. When his head is cut by Alibaba, it transforms itself in a snake and transfers himself into Hakuryuu's arm when he bites it. He manages to infiltrate in Sindria when he emanates from Hakuryu's arm, which is cut from him. He ends up defeated by Sinbad. Later it is revealed that it was Ithnan who approached Mogamett and helped Magnostadt to assume control of the Musta'sim Kingdom. Originally, Ithnan lived in Alma Torran and was member of Solomon's resistance.
Falan (ファーラン, Fāran)
Voiced by: Yū Kobayashi (Japanese); Tamara Ryan (English)
Originally a member of Solomon's party in Alma Torran, Falan was also Wahid's wife and mother to their son, but just like Ithnan, she later reappears as a member of Al-Thamen, backing Barbarossa's plan to seize the throne of Parthevia and sending assassins to kill Sinbad.
Wahid (ワヒード, Wahīdo)
Member of Solomon's resistance, he was also Falan's husband. After their only son is killed by David, he betrays Solomon alongside Ithnan, Falan and Arba. He was fatally injured protecting Falan, so he sacrificed himself to become the Medium of Ill Ilah, sealing Alma Torran's fate. He later makes an appearance in Ill Illah's dimension when Alibaba gets sent to it after getting cut by Hakuryuu's Djinn, Belial.
Zurmudd (ズルムッド, Zurumuddo)
Member of a trio of agents sent by Al-Thamen. While in the manga they appear in Torran to ambush Aladdin and his friends after they conquer Zagan, in the anime they break into Sindria after Judar destroys the magic barrier protecting it. A huge and muscular man who claims to not discriminate against women, thus has the habit of not holding back against them, although he admits an aversion to fighting men. He is confronted and killed by Masrur.
Apollonius (アポロニウス, Aporoniusu)
Another member of the trio sent by Al-Thamen. A short old man in a wheelchair capable of powerful destructive magic powered by his dark metal vessel. He is confronted and killed by Yamraiha.
Byoln (ビョルン, Byorun)
The third member of trio sent by Al-Thamen. A tall and thin man using a rapier-like Dark Metal Vessel to create doppelgangers from his shadow, he also proves to be a very capable swordsman being almost at Sharrkan's level but ends up defeated by him.
Markkio (マルッキオ, Marukkio)
Voiced by: Shin-ichiro Miki (Japanese); Liam O'Brien (English)
An agent of the Al-Thamen who works as Balbadd's financial advisor, with the name 'Banker'. With the pretense of helping Balbadd to prosper, he convinces King Abhmad to continuously borrow money from the Kou Empire which snowballs into a huge debt and the loss of its economic independence, ultimately leading to its annexation to the Empire.
Weapons/Arms Dealer (武器商人, Bukishōnin)
Voiced by: Shin-ichiro Miki
An agent of the Al-Thamen who supplied magic weapons to Cassim and his fellow members of the 'Fog Troupe' with the intention of further increasing chaos in Balbadd. He is destroyed by Sinbad in the manga, but in the anime he transforms into a snake and poisons Alibaba, and later Sinbad, contaminating them with the Black Rukh with the intention of having both fall into depravity before disappearing.

== Alma Torran ==
Solomon Jehoahaz Abraham (ソロモン・ヨアズ・アブラヒム, Soromon Yoazu Aburahimu)
Solomon, Aladdin's father and former king of the destroyed world Alma Torran, becomes the creator of the current world. 800 years after humanity gains magic, he leads a rebellion against the oppressive Orthodox magicians, ultimately uniting all species under his peaceful rule.
Sheba (シバ, Shiba)
Sheba is rescued by Solomon at age 12 and adopts his philosophy of equality for all species, joining his rebellion against the Orthodox magicians. She becomes one of Solomon's three Magi and later his lover, conceiving their child Aladdin. Betrayed and fatally wounded by Arba, she entrusts the unborn Aladdin to Ugo before dying.
Ugo (ウーゴ, Ūgo)
Voiced by: Toshiyuki Morikawa (Japanese); Patrick Seitz (English)
Ugo's initial appearance is that of a Djinn and keeper of the Sacred Temple. He can be summoned through Aladdin's flute, despite the absence of a formal contract. His substantial body exists independently from his head, which remains in a separate dimension. Ugo is a specialist in hand-to-hand combat, and he uses heat magic in his palms for devastating attacks. He is shy around women, a trait he overcomes through repeated interactions with Morgiana. During his confrontation with Kougyoku, his physical form is destroyed, but his head survives and is subsequently enshrined in the Sacred Temple, where he bestows the Wisdom of Solomon upon Aladdin. Originally known as Uraltugo Noi Nueph (ウラルトゥーゴ・ノイ・ヌエフ, Urarutūgo Noi Nuefu) in Alma Torran, Ugo was a magical prodigy in Solomon's inner circle who pioneered numerous magical theories and inventions, including flying vessels and the foundational study of Rukh properties. As the head of the Magician Orthodox's theoretical division, he made a significant contribution to the development of Solomon's magical systems.
Setta (セッタ)
Setta, a member of Solomon's resistance, grows up alongside Ithnan in the same church, treating him as a brother. David kills Setta, an event that drives Ithnan to depravity and his eventual alignment with Al-Thamen.
David Jehoahaz Abraham (ダビデ・ヨアズ・アブラヒム, Dabide Yoazu Aburahimu)
David is Aladdin's grandfather and leader of the Orthodox magicians. As the first Singularity, he lives for 800 years before being overthrown by his son Solomon. Foreseeing these events, David allows himself to be killed while warning Solomon against defying fate. His consciousness merges with Ill Ilah, and he later implants an extension of himself into Sinbad's body. Manifesting to assist Sinbad in subduing Ugo, David supports the plan to return all souls to the Rukh before seizing control of Sacred Place after Sinbad's change of heart. He attempts to absorb the Rukh but is ultimately destroyed by Sinbad, Aladdin, and their allies, along with the Rukh system.

== Djinn ==
Amon
Voiced by: Hidekatsu Shibata
Amon is a Djinn of discipline and solemnity, manifesting as a formidable bearded elder wreathed in flames. Initially bound to Alibaba's training sword—a gift from his father during visits to the slums—the Djinn later transferred to a royal blade originally presented by King Rashid to Sinbad. This vessel empowers Morgiana's emergency weapon, as her Fanalis physiology dedicates most Magoi to maintaining her immense strength, leaving little for sustained combat use. During the second Balbadd arc, Amon's power similarly enhances the weapons of Toto and Olba when they pledge themselves to Alibaba's cause.

=== Sinbad's Djinn ===
Baal
Voiced by: Hiroki Tōchi
A Djinn of wrath and heroes, Baal was the first Djinn captured by Sinbad. With the power to control lightning, it is contained within a small sword which belonged to his father and also empowers Ja'far, Masrur, Mistoras and Drakon's household vessels.
Valefor
Voiced by: Kappei Yamaguchi
A Djinn of falsehood and prestige. With the power to control ice, Valefor was the second Djinn captured by Sinbad. Entering the dungeon to rescue Hinahoho at first, Sinbad ends up into a multi-side battle for the Djinn's ownership against Hinahoho, Drakon and Ja'far, winning when he uses his wits against them. It is contained in a necklace Sinbad received from him. It also empowers Hinahoho's household vessel.
Zepar
A Djinn of spirit and puppetry, Zepar was originally captured by Serendine, and transferred to Sinbad when he absorbed her Rukh following her death. When fully equipped, this Djinn gives Sinbad a diminute, imp-like appearance, whose huge shout can force everyone who hears it under his permanent control. It is contained within his ring and also empowers Pisti's household vessel.
Furfur
A Djinn of madness and melancholy, Furfur is Sinbad's fourth Djinn, who gives him bat-like wings and magic strong enough to break through magical forcefields.
Focalor
A Djinn of rule and submission, Focalor is Sinbad's fifth Djinn. With the power to invoke tornadoes, it is contained within a silver bracelet he wears in Sinbad's right wrist and also empowers Sharrkan's household vessel
Vepar
Vepar is Sinbad's sixth Djinn who gives him a merman-like form, whose extreme magic, "Vepar Isuterraha", rains down hundreds of magic swords upon the enemy.
Crocell
Contained within Sinbad's long sword, Crocell is Sinbad's seventh and final Djinn, who gives him an animalistic form, capable of dealing fast and powerful attacks.

=== Hakuryuu Ren's Djinn ===
Zagan (ザガン)
Voiced by: Hiroki Takahashi (Japanese); Doug Erholtz (English)
A Djinn of loyalty and purity. With the power to control earth and life, he is contained within Hakuryuu's spear. With Zagan's power, Hakuryuu replaced his severed hand with one having plant features and subdues several monsters to serve as his personal army.
Belial
A Djinn of truth and conviction. With the power to control other beings by producing illusions, he attempts to have both Judar and Hakuryuu reform by having them confront and overcome their anger and resentment, but fails when the prince also falls into depravity instead and conquers the dungeon by force. It is contained within Hakuryuu's left shoulder guard. Having similar magic properties as Zagan's, Belial's power can be used in tandem with them to create new abilities never seen before, manifesting itself as a scythe when equipped.

=== Kouen Ren's Djinn ===
Astaroth
Voiced by: Kenta Matsumoto
A Djinn of terror and meditation. Just like Amon, it is capable of powerful fire magic. Its extreme magic creates flames that keep burning the enemy long after ignition. It empowers Seishuu Ri's household vessel.
Phenex
Voiced by: Mii Miki
A Djinn of kindness and mediation, capable of healing magic, which he uses to restore Hakuryuu's lost limbs in exchange of his. It is contained within Kouen's sword and empowers Kin Gaku's household vessel.
Agares
Voiced by: Junji Tachibana
Kouen's Djinn who empowers Kokuton Shu's household vessel.

== Other characters ==
Yunan (ユナン, Yunan)
Voiced by: Akira Ishida (Japanese); Max Mittelman (English)
The fourth and final Magi introduced. He remains unaffiliated with any faction despite having previously selected Sinbad as his king candidate. The first dungeon Baal, conquered by Sinbad, was one of many created by Yunan before his mysterious disappearance. He reappears when Morgiana encounters him within the Great Rift of the Dark Continent, where he warns of impending global conflict following Emperor Koutoku Ren's death. During the Magnostadt battle, Yunan allies with Sinbad after recruiting Morgiana's assistance. He later reveals to Aladdin his nine reincarnations—each preceded by meetings with Ugo—all part of his long-standing opposition to Al-Thamen. Yunan safeguards Alibaba's body after his death and participates in the final battles against both Arba and David.
Aum Madaura (大聖母, Ōmu Madōra)
Voiced by: Aya Hisakawa (Japanese); Dorah Fine (English)
Madaura first appears in Adventure of Sinbad as owner of the Mariadel Trading Company, a Reim-based slave trade operation where she employs psychological manipulation and torture to control children. After enslaving and breaking Sinbad, she places him in charge of other slaves until he escapes. When the Sindria Trading Company outmaneuvers her, she loses all assets—including Sinbad and future Eight General Masrur—and goes bankrupt. In the main series, she resurfaces wielding the Holy Mother Halo Fan, a magical device that manipulates children and teenagers into believing she is their mother. Leading a crew of brainwashed child pirates, she confronts Aladdin's group. While Hakuryuu proves vulnerable due to maternal trauma, Aladdin remains unaffected. After her defeat, Hakuryuu executes her, though her fan's lingering effects leave the children mourning and seeking revenge.
Olba (オルバ, Oruba)
Voiced by: Kei Shindou (Japanese); Danielle McRae (English)
Olba initially appears as a crew member under Aum Madaura before being rescued by Alibaba's group and relocated to Sindria. Following the Magnostadt conflict, he emerges as a swordsmanship apprentice under Sharrkan, having undergone significant physical growth. When Alibaba travels to Balbadd to meet Kouen Ren, Olba joins the expedition, during which he becomes both a member of Alibaba's household and Toto's romantic partner. The subsequent three-year timeskip reveals their marriage and the birth of two children.
