= Mira Kremer =

German chess player (1905–1987)

Personal information
- Born: 1905
- Died: 19 October 1987 Lütjensee, Germany

Chess career
- Country: Germany

Mira Kremer (1905 – 19 October 1987) was a German chess player who twice won East Germany Women's Chess Championships (1949, 1951).

== Chess career ==
Mira Kremer won the German Women's Chess Championship of the Eastern Zone, which took place from 23 July to 7 August 1949 in Bad Klosterlausnitz. She also won the 2. German Women's Chess Championship of the German Democratic Republic from 1 to 18 July 1951 in Schwerin.

Her other top places in Germany and East Germany Women's Chess Championships were:

- in 1939 at 3rd place in 1939 in Stuttgart, which Friedl Rinder won;
- in 1950 at 3rd place in Sömmerda, which Edith Keller won;
- in 1951 at 3rd place in Bad Klosterlausnitz, which Edith Keller won;
- in 1952 at 2nd place in Schwerin, which Edith Keller-Herrmann won;
- in 1953 at 2nd place in Weißenfels, which Gertrud Nüsken won;
- in 1955 at 2nd place in Zwickau, which Gertrud Nüsken won.
