= Shitsuji-sama no Okiniiri =

Japanese manga series

執事様のお気に入り
- Genre: Romantic comedy
- Manga
- Written by: Fuyu Tsuyama
- Illustrated by: Rei Izawa
- Published by: Hakusensha
- Magazine: Bessatsu Hana to Yume
- Original run: 2007 – 2015
- Volumes: 21

Shitsuji-sama no Okiniiri (執事様のお気に入り; lit. "Butler's Favorite") is a Japanese romantic comedy shōjo manga series with story by Fuyu Tsuyama and art by Rei Izawa. It was serialized on Bessatsu Hana to Yume by Hakusensha and it's published in French by Pika.

== Reception ==
Volume 4 reached the 10th place on the weekly Japanese manga chart. Volume 5 reached the 13th place, with 57,731 copies; volume 6 reached the 6th place, with 89,670 copies; volume 7 reached the 14th place, with 58,887 copies; volume 8 reached the 16th place, with 78,230 copies; volume 9 reached the 10th place, with 83,555 copies; volume 10 reached the 17th place, with 81,165 copies; volume 11 reached the 13th place and 94,795 copies; volume 12 reached the 10th place, with 74,919 copies; volume 13 reached the 11th place, with 68,210 copies; volume 14 reached the 11th place and 77,467 copies; volume 15 reached the 23rd place, with 38,997 copies; volume 16 reached the 15th place and 66,946 copies; volume 17 reached the 32nd place and 55,577 copies.

The staff at Manga Sanctuary gave it an average grade of 3 out of 5 stars.
