= Mira Seth =

Indian women's rights activist

Mira Seth is an Indian civil servant, diplomat, women's rights activist, and a former chairman of UNICEF.

She served several terms as a member of the UNICEF Executive Board at the international level, and was vice-chairman from 1990 to 1991 (when Lisbet Palme was chairman) and chairman from 1991 to 1992. Seth formerly worked with the Department of Industrial Development. Her studies on women's involvement in several different economic efforts, such as the regulation of handlooms and fisheries is an expert on women and development issues. Seth turned her study, Women and Development: The Indian Experience, into a book after many requests. One of Seth's key ideals is ‘give us jobs- we can do the rest’, referencing the concept that giving women the ability to enter the workforce without barriers in developing countries will allow for even greater economic growth. Seth has even directed a film, 'Mera Shinder Puttar', which talks about the trials and tribulations of an illegal migrant and the family he left behind in India.

== Publications ==
- Women and Development: The Indian Experience, SAGE Publications, 2001, ISBN 978-0761994879
