= Mira Kaddoura =

Lebanese-Canadian conceptual artist

- Born: Alexandria, Egypt
- Occupations: Advertising Creative, Conceptual Artist
- Known for: Red & Co.
- Title: Executive Creative Director of Red & Co.
- Board member of: PICA; Dubai Institute of Design and Innovation
- Website: redandco.com

Mira Kaddoura (born in Alexandria, Egypt) is a Lebanese-Canadian conceptual artist and founder of Red & Co., an advertising agency headquartered in Portland, Oregon, USA with a cohort in Amsterdam, Netherlands. She is known for her work on Nike, The Girl Effect , Netflix, and Google’s Made with Code. In addition, her conceptual projects like The Wonder Clock, have tested cultural assumptions around feminism and biology.

Kaddoura grew up in Lebanon, part of a family of influential women including Ibtihaj Kaddoura and Zahia Kaddoura, who were early feminists and advocates for Arab women’s rights from the beginning of the 20th century. Kaddoura studied design at the American University in Beirut and received a master's in communication from Virginia Commonwealth University Brandcenter.

She began her advertising career at Wieden & Kennedy’s global headquarters in Portland, Oregon as an art director. During her tenure at Wieden & Kennedy’s Portland and London offices, she created much-awarded work for Nike (I Feel Pretty with Maria Sharapova, Body Parts aka 'Big Butt' campaign), The Girl Effect, Target, Belvedere Vodka, and Travel Oregon.

In 2011, Kaddoura left Wieden & Kennedy and then in late 2013 started her own agency, Red & Co.. As Executive Creative Director at Red & Co., she has created Netflix’s Make Room diversity film, as well as Made with Code, a project Red & Co. co-created with Google to involve 1 million girls in coding, since then, the project has created over five million coders, becoming a program at Google.

Kaddoura is an advocate for women and diversity and has been interviewed numerous times about women-founded agencies and the benefits of creating diverse and equitable workplaces. Her ideas have been featured on Good Morning America, The New York Times, the 3% conference, Creative Mornings and in magazine interviews about creativity, feminism, and advertising. In 2018, Kaddoura was invited to present her TEDx talk “How Women Can Change the World by Asking ‘Why Not Me’?” in Portland, Oregon. She recently was honored as a Portland Advertising Federation Rosie’s 2019 Ad Person of the Year, a 2019 Ad Age Women to Watch and Adweek 2019 Creative 100.

She serves as a board member for the Portland Institute for Contemporary Art (Pica) and the Dubai Institute of Design and Innovation (DIDI). She speaks English, Arabic, and French.
