= Mira Zore-Armanda =

Croatian oceanographer

- Born: 6 January 1930
- Died: 8 April 2012 (aged 82)
- Education: University of Zagreb, University of Paris
- Years active: 1952–1989
- Employer(s): Institute of Oceanography and Fisheries in Split
- Known for: Oceanography of the Adriatic Sea

Mira Zore-Armanda (Zagreb, 6 January 1930–Opatija, 8 April 2012) was a Croatian oceanographer. She was a senior scientist at the Institute of Oceanography and Fisheries in Split, where her research focused on the Adriatic Sea. She published about 150 research papers before her retirement in 1989.

== Early life ==
Mira Zore was born in Zagreb, the daughter of Miro Zore and Marija Nabergoj. She studied geophysics as an undergraduate at the University of Zagreb under Josip Goldberg, graduating in 1952 with a thesis titled "Oscillation of bays with an application to the Kaštela Bay". She defended her doctoral dissertation on currents in the Adriatic Sea at the University of Paris in 1963. Henri Lacombe was her doctoral advisor.

== Career ==
Zore started working at the Institute of Oceanography and Fisheries in Split in 1952 and stayed there for her entire career. Early in her career, she encountered some difficulty in gaining passage on research vessels (to do field work and data gathering) because she was female. Most of her research focused on circulation in the Adriatic Sea, and later on the Istrian coastal sea. She was intrigued by long-term climatic variability and its possible causes. She conducted research on interannual salinity variations in the Adriatic to the extent of the Arctic area covered by ice and the meridional pressure gradient in the Mediterranean. She often collaborated with marine biologists in studying fish production, and with chemists on questions of salinity. She published about 150 research papers before she retired in 1989.

Zore-Armanda taught at the University of Zagreb. From 1976 to 1978, she was director of the Institute of Oceanography and Fisheries. She was vice president of the Physical Oceanography Committee of the International Union of Geodesy and Geophysics. She co-authored an introductory text on oceanography and marine meteorology, and was editor-in-chief of the academic journal Acta Adriatica.

== Personal life ==
Mira Zore married Igor Armanda, a chemist, in 1959. In widowhood, she moved to Opatija to live with her sister and her family. She died in 2012, aged 82 years.

== Sources ==
- Orlić, Mirko (2012). "In memoriam: Dr. Mira Zore-Armanda" (PDF). Geofizika. 29 (2). Zagreb: Andrija Mohorovicic Geophysical Institute: 193–205.
