= Mira Ptacin =

American author

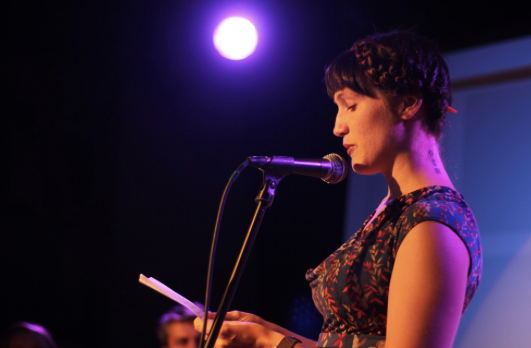
- Ptacin in 2023

Mira Ptacin is an American writer. She is the author of Poor Your Soul and The In-Betweens: The Spiritualists, Mediums, and Legends of Camp Etna. Ptacin has also written for The New York Times, Vogue, Guernica, BuzzFeed, and other publications. Named the 2026 Maine Arts Commission Fellow, she teaches memoir-writing to women at the Maine Correctional Center and is a former visiting professor of creative nonfiction at Colby College.

In Poor Your Soul, Ptacin recounts her experiences terminating an unexpected pregnancy after an ultrasound revealed that her child would be born with various birth defects and no chance of survival outside the womb. She goes into detail about her reaction to the grief that followed, while also sharing stories about her mother’s emigration from Poland to the United States and her late brother, who was killed by a drunk driver.

In The In-Betweens, Ptacin draws on her experiences at Camp Etna, a Spiritualist enclave in Maine, providing historical details about the community. According to New York Times contributor J. Courtney Sullivan, Ptacin “has a curious, warm, non-judgmental tone about her, and she's funny, too.”

Ptacin also hosts conversations with other authors for Literary Hub.

== Personal life ==
Ptacin was born and raised in Battle Creek, Michigan, received a bachelor's degree in cultural anthropology from Western Michigan University, and received a master's degree from Sarah Lawrence College. She lives on Peaks Island with her family and farm animals.

== Selected works ==
=== Books ===
— (2016). Poor your soul. New York, NY: Soho Press. ISBN 978-1616956349.

— (2019). The In-Betweens: The Spiritualists, Mediums, and Legends of Camp Etna (1st ed.). Liveright Publishing Corporation. ISBN 978-1-63149-381-2.

=== Articles ===
— (17 October 2024). "The Crash of the Hammer: How Concerned Citizens Ran a Neo-Nazi Out of Rural Maine". The Atavist Magazine.
