= Blade of the Immortal (2019 TV series) =

Japanese anime series

- Cover of the complete Blu-ray collection released by Sentai Filmworks on January 19, 2021.
- Kanji: 無限の住人
- Revised Hepburn: Mugen no Jūnin
- Country of origin: Japan
- No. of episodes: 24 (list of episodes)

Original release
- Network: Amazon Prime Video
- Release: October 10, 2019 – March 25, 2020

Blade of the Immortal (Japanese: 無限の住人-IMMORTAL-, Hepburn: Mugen no Jūnin: Immortal) is an anime television series based on the manga series Blade of the Immortal by Hiroaki Samura. The series is set in Japan during the mid-Tokugawa shogunate period and follows the cursed samurai Manji, who has to kill 1000 evil men in order to regain his mortality.

The series is animated by Liden Films and directed by Hiroshi Hamasaki, with Makoto Fukami handling series composition, Shingo Ogiso designing the characters, and Eiko Ishibashi composing the music. It premiered on October 10, 2019, on Amazon Prime Video. On October 15, 2020, it was announced that Sentai Filmworks had licensed the anime for home video release in winter 2021. The anime was released on Blu-ray on January 19, 2021.

The opening theme is "Survive of Vision" is Kiyoharu.

== Episode list ==
No.	Title (Note: All English titles are taken from Amazon Prime Video.)	Written by	Original release date
1	"Act One – Meeting" (Japanese: 一幕 遭逢 ─そうほう─)	Makoto Fukami	October 10, 2019
A recap of events at the beginning of the series produced in 2008. It shows the death of Manji's sister Machi, and Manji killing the entire band of rōnin responsible; the slaughter of the Asano family; Rin Asano meeting Yaobikuni for the first time and then seeking Manji; Manji's decision to help Rin; and Rin's encounter with Sabato Kuroi and his slaying by Manji.
2	"Act Two – Founding" (Japanese: 二幕 開闢 ─かいびゃく─)	Makoto Fukami	October 10, 2019
Manji and Rin visit the famous swordsman and artist Master Sori to enlist his aid for revenge on the Ittō-ryū. Rin tries to convince him to join her, revealing that she is aware that he is a spy for the shogunate. Manji storms out of the house, but Rin stays, and wakes to find herself attacked by followers of the Ittō-ryū. Manji returns and slays many of them but is trapped against spikes on a tree. Rin unsuccessfully tries to fight off their leader, but just as he is about to kill her, Sori awakens from his artistic reverie when blood spatters on his face, and he stabs the leader through the throat. Later, Sori gives Rin some money as payment for providing the right color (blood) to complete his masterpiece. When Rin takes Manji's unusual weapons to a blacksmith for sharpening, she sees her father's sword. When its owner Taito Magatsu arrives, she begs him to sell it to her. He agrees only if she tells him where to find the daughter of the Asano dojo, suspecting that she is that girl. Seeing how upset she is about the sword, Manji seeks out Magatsu, whilst Rin sleeps. They have a fierce fight, both sustaining severe injuries, but Manji returns with Rin's father's sword.
3	"Act Three – Dream Pangs" (Japanese: 三幕 夢弾 ─ゆめびき─)	Makoto Fukami	October 17, 2019
Manji is approached by Makie who attempts to seduce him, realizing it is a trap, they fight. She reveals that she is from the Ittō-ryū, but Manji easily defeats her. Makie is shown meeting Kagehisa Anotsu and says he is only interested in her fighting ability, but Anotsu says he also desires her as a woman and kisses her. After Anotsu leaves, three swordsmen who have been sent by her former employer attempt to take Makie back by force, but she cuts her hair short and then easily cuts them to pieces. Makie seeks out Manji again, this time not holding back, and they fight viciously in the narrow alleyways. Manji tries to ambush Makie, but she dodges him, slashing off an arm and leg, then impaling him with his own sword. Makie hesitates, shocked by her own brutality, but Manji convinces her to keep fighting and she defeats him. Rin arrives and throws herself in front of Manji and Makie questions how much blood will be shed to satisfy Rin's revenge. Rin replies that shedding blood for her family is better than shedding blood to justify oneself. Makie departs and encounters her "sister" O-Hatsu who is returning to the red light district, but Mackie declines to join her. Makie departs the Ittō-ryū, only leaving a note for Anotsu saying that she has gone.
4	"Act Four – Rin at Odds" (Japanese: 四幕 斜凜 ─しゃりん─)	Kenzen	October 24, 2019
When Kagehisa Anotsu was a child, Makie saved him from wild dogs, but his grandfather Saburō Anotsu berated him for cowardice. He beat Makie and tied her to a tree because she was the daughter of a rival clan even though she displayed great fighting skills. In the present, Rin encounters Kagehisa Anotsu training with an axe in the nearby forest. Realizing that she has been detected, she throws all of her knives, but only one lands in his shoulder and she realizes how poor her skills are. He then tells her the reason for the animosity between their families was their opposing views of the importance of traditional swordsmanship versus the ability to win a contest between two opponents using whatever means possible. Anotsu releases Rin and returns her weapons to her, explaining that by using her knives, she has already departed from the Mutenichi-ryū tradition. When Anotsu leaves, Rin cries in confusion and despair. Later, Kagehisa Anotsu recalls the time when he inherited the Ittō-ryū after his grandfather's faithful companion killed him so that Kagehisa could become his successor and pursue his own fighting style.
5	"Act Five – Song of the Bugs" (Japanese: 五幕 蟲の唄 ─むしのうた─)	Makoto Fukami	October 31, 2019
Manji and Rin encounter Eiku Shizuma disguised as a monk, who offers help finding Anotsu. After Manji declines, Shizuma suddenly attacks him and they fatally stab each other. Shizuma reveals that he is also immortal and leaves, but that night Manji cries out in pain as blood spews from fissures in his body from old wounds. Manji realizes that Shizuma's dagger was poisoned and is killing the sacred bloodworms that cause his immortality. Rin gives Manji some Asano family antitoxin pills to help neutralize the poison and leaves to find a doctor. She meets an old woman disguised as Yaobikuni, but it is a trap set by Shizuma to kidnap Rin and draw out Manji. Shizuma tells Rin that he served under a military commander two hundred years ago during the Sengoku period and became immortal but still lost everything important to him. Shizuma offers her some of his blood, saying his legacy will be giving her immortality. Rin agonises over this choice but as she nears Shizuma's wound, an injured Manji arrives. He and Shizuma fight mercilessly and Rin creates a distraction, allowing Manji to impale Shizuma on his own poisoned sword, releasing him from his sad life, as he wished. With his last breath, Shizuma says Anotsu is heading to Kaga. Rin asks Manji if immortality only prolongs the pain of never achieving one's goals.
6	"Act Six – Wing Roots" (Japanese: 六幕 羽根 ─はね─)	Kenzen	November 7, 2019
Rin has a frustrating encounter at a food stand, encountering a rude young Renzo Kawakami. Rin recalls what her grandfather said about the futility of revenge and ignores him. Meanwhile, Manji encounters Araya Kawakami at a mask shop who reveals that he was a member of the Ittō-ryū. Later, an arrogant samurai unfairly blames Renzo for breaking his sandal, but Rin defends the boy, offering to repair it. She mentions she is from the Asano dojo which the man mocks, cleaning his foot on her clothes and rudely under her kimono. Rin humbly fixes the sandal and prevents Renzo's outrage. Renzo invites Rin home for tea and she purposely goes without her sword. She meets Arauya, Renzo's father, and tells him about the murder of her parents two years earlier. Araya realizes he killed Rin's father and assaulted her mother, sending Renzo away. Seeing he is a caring father, Rin seeks an apology instead of vengeance. He refuses and attacks her, saying he must kill her to prevent his son from learning his past. As he is about to strangle Rin, Manji arrives and kills Araya in a duel. Renzo returns, and seeing his father dead, spears Manji before fleeing. Later, Renzo announces to Rin that he must leave to kill his father's killer. To dissuade Renzo from her own path, Rin convinces him that she killed Manji and shows him Manji's arm, buried, which he re-attaches later.
7	"Act Seven – Evil's Shadow" (Japanese: 七幕 凶影 ─きょうえい─)	Makoto Fukami	November 14, 2019
While being carried in a Kago, Magatsu is ambushed, but he kills his two attackers, although not before one reveals his employer was Akagi. Magatsu arrives at the Ittō-ryū dojo by foot just as Kagimura Habaki, a member of Daimyo's guard, is leaving. Anotsu reveals that soon the Ittō-ryū will be retained by the Shogunate, so Magatsu decides to leave the Ittō-ryū due to his hatred of samurai. Meanwhile, Chogo Morozumi of the Ittō-ryū is attacked by Giichi who extracts from him the names of a number of masters within the dojo before killing him with his chained double blade. Elsewhere, the Ittō-ryū vice-captain, Ken'ei Fusano is poisoned by Hyakurin posing as a geisha. Magatsu returns to O-Ren who works at the brothel where the Ittō-ryū have given him a room to stay in. O-Ren loves Magatsu and entreats him to stay with her, but he leaves. Shira arrives later looking for Magatsu, and in frustration, cruelly kills O-Ren. Soon after, Shira arrives at Rin and Manji's hut, looking for Manji. He rudely assaults her, and later explains that he is from the Mugai-ryū which is trying to annihilate the Ittō-ryū. When Manji leaves to pick up his sword from being sharpened, Shira offers Rin some meat telling her it is from a wild boar. Whilst eating the meat, Shira laughs and taunts her, revealing that he killed and cooked her dog. Rin is horrified and vomits whilst Shira mocks her.
8	"Act Eight – Mugai-ryu" (Japanese: 八幕 無骸流 ─むがいりゅう─)	Kenzen	November 21, 2019
Rin and Manji meet with Shira and Hyakurin at the Mugai-ryū to discuss plans to defeat the Ittō-ryū. Meanwhile, Magatsu returns days later to find O-Ren dead. Hyakurin learns through Makoto, her spy at the Ittō-ryū, that Anotsu is dressing as a geisha to enter the Kobotoke gate. They keep watch and Rin helps them identify him, but after Shira and Rin follow the figure for some distance, they realize that they have been duped and led into a trap by a hired prostitute. They are attacked by the Ittō-ryū, Saikaya and Sei disguised as pharmacists, however Shira kills them both and begins to slash and rape the woman. Rin draws her sword and attacks Shira, and as Shira disarms Rin, Manji arrives and severs Shira's hand. Shocked, he runs off but this is witnessed by locals, and he suspects they will be blamed for the bloodbath and dead "pharmacists".
9	"Act Nine – Gathering" (Japanese: 九幕 群 ─むら─)	Makoto Fukami	November 28, 2019
Rin encounters a rōnin carrying a severed head who only says he is from the Shingyoto-ryu, Ibane School, and to be beware. At the Ohara tea stop, Rin sees a wanted poster for her and Manji. Rin asks the Nakamaya couple living near the Kobotoke gate to help her cross. They refuse and tell her the story of a desperate prostitute they helped three years earlier who was caught and beheaded. Nevertheless, she convinces them to help her, as she is willing to risk her life, and Nakamaya takes her to the gate. Rin, posing as the sister of Nakamaya's wife, is closely questioned by the overly suspicious commissioner Shamada. Fortunately, Nakamaya's wife fully briefed Rin with enough facts to convince Shimada of her identity, including a fake caesarean section scar on her stomach and they are both allowed entry. Alone and through the gate, Rin realizes that Nakamaya's wife took half of her money as payment for the extreme risk they took to help her and weeps in despair.
10	"Act Ten – Animal" (Japanese: 十幕 獣 ─けもの─)	Kenzen	December 5, 2019
A lone Rin makes her way to Kaga, living off the land. Meanwhile, worried about Rin, Manji encounters a man who offers to help him obtain a pass and at the same time comes across Magatsu. Shira returns to Hyakurin and Shinriji, behaving suspiciously, but soon leaves. Hyakurin tells Shinriji they must leave but they are immediately attacked by Kinuka and the Ittō-ryū who were led there by Shira. Hyakurin is captured and Shinriji is killed trying to help her. Later, she is savagely beaten, tortures and raped as they seek information about the Mugai-ryū and who Akagi is. Giichi finds Shinriji's body and follows their trail. After dispatching Kinuka's men, Giichi catches Kinuka outside his headquarters and they engage in a vicious fight which leaves Kinuka dead. The swordsman guarding her runs outside and threatens to kill Hyakurin before Giichi can stop him. Hyakurin manages to remove a blade from her shoe and frees herself, before staggering outside and cutting him to pieces. Giichi reports the incident to his superiors, and cares for Hyakurin who dreams about her tragic past as she remains unconscious for three days. Later, she cuts her hair short and places the tied locks on Shinriji's grave.
11	"Act Eleven – Fall Frost" (Japanese: 十一幕 秋霜 ─しゅうそう─)	Makoto Fukami	December 12, 2019
Manji and Magatsu approach Uenohara, and are attacked by Shira, whose hair has turned white, and his hired swordsmen. Shira severs Manji's hand as vengeance, but it reattaches and Manji withdraws so that Magatsu can take his revenge for O-Ren's death. Shira cuts Magatsu with the bones of his right forearm which he has sharpened into points. Manji comes to Magatsu's aid, but Shira escapes again. While Manji deals with the swordsmen, Magatsu follows Shira to settle his debt. They fight a bloody battle, both sustaining major injuries, but when Shira hangs from a cliff by his remaining hand, Magatsu cuts it off and Shira falls into the river far below. Manji gives a heavily injured Magatsu half of the money he took from the swordsmen who surrendered and leaves for Kaga. Meanwhile, Rin collapses from fatigue and lack of food before she is given water by someone. To her horror, it is Anotsu and she screams.
12	"Act Twelve – Blood of Finality" (Japanese: 十二幕 終血 ─しゅうけつ─)	Makoto Fukami	December 19, 2019
Rin and Anotsu are found by members of the Shingyoyo-ryu dojo, who challenge him, but he easily disposes of them with his axe. He walks off with Rin vainly trying to follow behind. As they shelter in a cave he explains that he was travelling to Kaga at the request of the Shingyoyo-ryu dojo who were seeking to join him. However, they were trampled by the Shogunate and after the leader and his daughter committed suicide, their followers blamed Anotsu. The two continue on to a village where Anotsu gives Rin money for food and seeks out Makie who is barely surviving and has been self harming. Anotsu consoles and embraces her and then leaves for Takayama with Rin. After his deteriorating condition becomes obvious to Rin, he reveals that he must have contracted tetanus from the poisoned blades used in the fight days earlier. Seeing more Shingyoyo-ryu swordsmen pursuing then, Rin helps the weakened Anotsu fight. Back in Edo, the new leader of the Shogun's Banshu samurai, Kagimura Habaki, welcomes members of the Ittō-ryū to a banquet. Meanwhile, some Shingyoyo-ryu swordsmen catch Rin and force her to take them to Anotsu who is so ill that he cannot stand and has lost the ability to speak. Rin finds herself begging for Anotsu's life and Manji arrives on the scene, followed by Magatsu and Makie. Rin pleads with Manji to kill the swordsmen and immediately despairs over this decision. The Shingyoyo-ryu attack, but Makie cuts a bloody swathe through the group. When only the leader remains, he challenges Anotsu who takes a sword thrust through his body enabling him to kill the swordsman. As Rin departs with Manji she swears to Anotsu that she will still kill him.
13	"Act Thirteen ─ Twilight" (Japanese: 十三幕 誰そ彼 ─たそかれ─)	Makoto Fukami	December 26, 2019
At the Mugai-ryū banquet held for ten dojo leaders of the Ittō-ryū by Habaki, nine are poisoned and only Sosuke Abayama survives because he left to relieve himself. Later, Giichi accepts payment from Habaki for the killings, and asks that Hyakurin be extracted from the Mugai-ryū. Habaki refuses. Having heard about the massacre, the gathered Ittō-ryū realise Akagi is Kagimura Habaki and Anotsu plans his revenge, blaming himself for becoming complacent during their recent successes. The remaining leaders support Anotsu so he decides they should separate, going into hiding, before re-emerging in winter. Elsewhere, Abayama finds and kills Makoto for leaking information to the Mugai-ryū. Giichi finds Manji with Rin, and brings him an unrefusable offer from Habaki to join the Mugai-ryū. Manji says no so they prepare to fight to the death. Both are fast, strong and cunning, but Manji emerges as the victor after breaking Giichi's weapon. Curious, Manji agrees to meet Habaki whilst Hyakurin (now with unbleached hair) finds Rin waiting outside and takes her to eat. Habaki painfully tests Manji's immortality by stabbing him in the chest. Confirming this, he tells Manji he has already competed his role and has him detained. Upon her return, Rin is told that Manji has left. Manji awakens and find himself chained in a dungeon before a bloodstained stone table when a group arrives.
14	"Act Fourteen – Amendments" (Japanese: 十四幕 改起 ─かいき─)	Kenzen	January 2, 2020
Habaki assigns the surgeon Ayame Burando to examine and test Manji's immortal qualities within eight days. He plans to create another immortal- the prisoner Dewanosuke. Meanwhile, Rin is attacked by Doa Yoshino before her companion, Isaku Yasonokami, promptly apologises and claims this was a reflex. They ask to stay with Rin and she reluctantly agrees, unaware that they are Ittō-ryū members. Rin later goes in search of Manji, accompanied by Hyakurin. At the meeting place, they are refused entry and told Manji has left before Hyakurin is given a note from Habaki which says her and Giichi are free and the Mugai-ryū have been disbanded. Rin, Doa and Isaku begin to get along and Rin tells a shocked Isaku that her parents were killed by the Ittō-ryū. Back at the prison, Burando attempts a live dissection of Manji but his hand is almost caught inside Manji's body as it heals, which gives him an idea. Manji and Dewanosuke plan an escape, but Habaki appears and severs the right hands of both prisoners. He then has Burando stitch Manji's hand onto Dewanosuke which heals quickly indicating some of Manji's immortal powers have been transferred to Dewanosuke. Habaki then plans an even more daring experiment by switching a larger part of their bodies and calls for Yamada Asaemon, the beheader.
15	"Act Fifteen – Acquisition of Guts" (Japanese: 十五幕 臓承 ─ぞうしょう─)	Kenzen	January 16, 2020
Asaemon Yoshihiro Yamada is engaged to sever the limbs and organs of Manji and Dewanosuke so they can be exchanged. After eight days, Dewanosuke acquires some level of immortality, and Habaki grants Burando a stay of execution. However, Habaki demands a final test and runs his sword through Dewanosuke's heart. Dewanosuke dies, but Habaki insists that Burando commence the experiment with another prisoner. Burando, having formed a bond with his patient, is devastated he could not save him. He tries again with more prisoners, but all of his patients die. Burando becomes desolate and Habaki gives him ten days to succeed. After a stint in solitary confinement, Burando begins to descend into insanity. Running out of prisoners, Habaki's men are searching for more victims when they encounter Doa and Isaku travelling with Rin. A fight ensues and Doa kills most of the men but reinforcements arrive. Isaku throws the two women into the river to safety and confronts them alone, but is captured because of his Christian refusal to kill anyone. Burando recommences his experiments with renewed vigour and when his assistant Toraeman is horrified, he covers the victim's heads with animal masks. By day sixty five, Burando has gathered data about blood affinities and immortality.
16	"Act Sixteen – Altered Limb" (Japanese: 十六幕 肢転 ─してん─)	Kenzen	January 23, 2020
Rin and Doa surveil the prison, hoping to find Isaku, and while watching, Doa recalls how she met Isaku and they became travelling companions. Doa is distraught after learning about the experiments and Rin convinces her they can infiltrate the secret Fukiage facility, beneath Edo Castle. Meanwhile, Burando sends Habaki a note reading "success". Elsewhere, Hyakimaru tries to abort the pregnancy that has resulted from her attack but is stopped by Giichi who says he will raise the child. Doa and Rin begin their assault into the underground prison whilst Hyakimaru joins the local women gathered outside the gates who are demanding the return of their husbands. Suddenly, Rin and Doa are caught in a hidden trap laid by Lord Sakura who guards the passageways. Rin claims that she killed the guards and Doa is only her assistant so she should receive both their punishments. Sakura commences one hundred lashes for Rin, but a despairing Doa manages to cut herself free and kills the guards before stabbing Sakura to death in rage. Toraeman and the other traumatised doctors allow them to pass, giving them keys. The two continue and Rin sets off an explosion, blocking the entrance, but also alerting everyone to the trouble within the prison. The two women soon encounter a number of zombie-like immortals and see the discarded bodies of the men sacrificed in Burando's cruel experiment. Doa sees Isaku's crucifix on a severed body, telling Rin to continue without her.
17	"Act Seventeen – Ceremonial Bond" (Japanese: 十七幕 儀結 ─ぎけつ─)	Kenzen	January 30, 2020
Rin finds Manji in a cell, but she is stopped by Burando. Using her new fighting skills, she beats him and frees Manji. Meanwhile, after the protests outside grow, the men are released to their families to avoid a dangerous confrontation. As Rin begins to free Manji from his shackles, Habaki arrives at the cell. Rin momentarily distracts him while Manji throws a hairpin, contaminated with various anaesthetics, from Dewanosuke into Habaki's eye. Yamada also arrives, but he is followed by Doa and Isaku, who is alive after Doa reconnected the parts of his severed body. When Yamada admits he cut Isaku, Doa attacks him but he is skilled and cuts through the iron plate insert in her hat. Before he is about to cut Manji's chains, Isaku is suddenly carried away by water flooding through the passageway and Rin tells Doa to follow. Feigning being dead, Yamada severs Manji's shackled arm but Manji manages to defeat him. As the water levels increase, Manji tells Rin to retrieve his arm when a masked man picks it up. Rin is shocked to see that it is Renzo who gives it to a cackling Shira. Later, Burando, who was rescued by his brother, destroys his notes and realizes that the search for immortality is futile. Reunited, Isaku and Doa part ways with Manji and Rin. Doa gives Rin a dagger to carve, to give to her love in the Ainu tradition, as payment instead of rent.
18	"Act Eighteen – Banshee's Cries" (Japanese: 十八幕 鬼哭 ─きこく─)	Makoto Fukami	February 6, 2020
Following the Fukiage incident, Habaki is ordered to commit seppuku, but as leader of the new Rokki-dan and in the Bushido way, intends to eliminate the Ittō-ryū within thirty days. His illegitimate daughter Ryo recalls how her father even became an assassin for the Shogunate to elevate his status to commander. Hanabusa Ugen is appointed to Habaki's former position and meets Anotsu. To avoid bloodshed, he gives the Ittō-ryū a week to leave Edo or be killed. Anotsu surprisingly agrees. To dissuade Habaki from violence, Hanabusa takes hostages which insults Shima, Habaki's wife. Ryo recklessly attacks Hanabusa's men, but Shima intercedes and agrees to be taken with her son Sakutaro into Hanabusa's custody. The Rokki-dan ruthlessly torture to track down the Ittō-ryū and finally find their burned-out dojo. However, it has been booby-trapped and many men are killed when Magatsu and some Ittō-ryū appear. Ryo pursues them, but is shocked when Magatsu easily defeats her. Later, Hanabusa orders Habaki to surrender the Rokki-dan, but Shima surprisingly intervenes. Their son Sakutaro apologises to his father for being a hindrance before Shima kills him and then herself. Hanabusa is mortified by the bloodshed, but a despondent Habaki demands twenty days to pursue the Ittō-ryū and kill Anotsu. Should he fail, he will bring the heads of the other Rokki-dan before killing himself. He tells Hanabusa he will kill him if he tries to stop him.
19	"Act Nineteen – Massacre" (Japanese: 鏖 ─みなごろし─)	Makoto Fukami	February 13, 2020
The Rokki-dan are searching for the Ittō-ryū and Rin again helps Anotsu evade them. Anotsu explains the officials wrongly believe he is going to Satsuma and allows Rin to come, but only if Manji comes too. Meanwhile, Abayama and a band of Ittō-ryū recruits lead the Rokki-dan away from Anotsu. Shogunate spies, Meguro and Tanpopo, are attacked by another group of Shogunate spies and Tanpopo is wounded by a poisoned shuriken. Rin and Manji have set off after the Ittō-ryū and come across Meguro and Tanpopo. Searching for a doctor, they encounter Burando and Rin reveals their identities to the spies. Anotsu then launches a surprise attack on Hanabusa's castle with Magatsu and skilled swordsmen Ozuhan and Baro Sukezane. They cut a bloody path through the poorly prepared defenders, killing the captains of the Oban and Kosho squads. The four reach Hanabusa and force him to agree that swordsmanship will now be taught in the Shogunate under the direction of the Ittō-ryū, before throwing him into the moat and escaping. Ozuhan gets separated from the group and an injured Sukezane stays behind to allow their escape.
20	"Act Twenty – Unending" (Japanese: 霏々 ─ひひ─)	Kenzen	February 27, 2020
As Meguro and Tanpopo return to Lord Habaki Shira hears them mention Manji and they divulge his location. Shira attacks the palanquin carrying Rin and ties her to a wharf, half-submerged in a freezing lake. Manji finds Shira and as they fight, he realizes that Shira can no longer feel pain after he has attached Manji's severed forearm. When Manji sees Rin in the water being guarded by Renzo, Manji breaks off the fight to free her. However, she sinks to the bottom, tied to a heavy stone. Meanwhile, Anotsu and Magatsu unknowingly stumble upon Shira. Anotsu continues, but Shira and Magatsu fight and Shira gains the upper hand. A despairing Manji pleads with Renzo to give him his sword to free Rin but Shira arrives and takes them. Suddenly, Tanpopo leaps into the water to save Rin while Meguro fights with Shira, He defeats her and just before killing her, he is impaled with a sword by Magatsu. Manji emerges from the lake and attacks a laughing Shira again who believes he has killed Rin. They viciously cut each other to pieces and, when Manji takes Shira's only working eye, he tells him that his wounds aren't recovering because the small number of sacred bloodworms cannot repair his body at the same rate as those inhabiting Manji. Magatsu finally aids Manji on horseback to deal a final blow to Shira. Later, Shira is ripped apart by wild dogs while he warns Renzo against seeking vengeance.
21	"Act Twenty One – Trap" (Japanese: 陥穽 ─かんせい─)	Kenzen	March 4, 2020
Meguro, Tanpopo and Magatsu shelter from the snow in a hut with the recovering Rin and Manji. However, Renzo still seeks revenge and proposes to sever both of Manji's arms whilst he is unconscious. The others stop him and Rin offers her arms instead, saying she killed Renzo's father and hired Manji as a bodyguard. A frustrated Renzo demands to know the truth about his father and Magatsu tells Rin that her silence is not compassion. Magatsu says Araya was a member of the Ittō-ryū and suggests Renzo find out more about his father in Edo before choosing vengeance. Meanwhile, Ryo volunteers to accompany Lord Habaki's man Ban in a dangerous pursuit of a small band of Ittō-ryū led by Koji. Ryo realizes that Ban is preparing to desert, but they are attacked by the Ittō-ryū who have laid a series of traps. Fighting together, they survive the attack but Ban is overcome by carbon dioxide fumes in the thin mountain air which is emanating from multiple jars of carbonic acid that Koji had placed. Koji kills the hallucinating Ban, and pursues Ryo who is also succumbing to the fumes. He finds her semi-conscious, but as he is about to kill her, she springs a trap of her own and kills him. Later, she is found by Lord Mitake and taken to Giichi and Hyakurin for protection as Kagimura's only family member. Habaki plans to eliminate the remaining eleven Ittō-ryū before they reunite and Rin and Manji continue on their journey.
22	"Act Twenty Two – Ten Final Pushes" (Japanese: 十掉尾 ─じゅっとうび─)	Makoto Fukami	March 11, 2020
The Rokki-dan fighters, Shishiya Arashino, Tarieshin Hasshu, and Shozo Murasaki arrive at Abayama's Ittō-ryū camp in Mitoji with the severed head of new recruit Yatsushiba. Abayama prepares to fight but Giichi arrives on horseback with Hyakurin, and draws him out. Amon sends the three stronger swordsmen Arisus, Koda and Yatoin to back him up. The fight commences and the one-armed Abayama manages to sever Giichi's ear. Hyakurin causes a distraction by attacking the three supporting Ittō-ryū, causing Abayama to lose concentration. Giichi finds an opening, allowing him to savagely beat and stab Abayama. Meanwhile back at the Ittō-ryū camp, the Rokki-dan fighters easily defeat the inexperienced fighters. However, Kunimitsu Amon manages to catch Shozo Murasaki in his own blast of deadly acid, killing them both. Later, Habaki meets the Rokki-dan, turning his attention to Anotsu and the remaining Ittō-ryū. He believes they will leave by boat from Nakaminato at the mouth of the Naka River (Tochigi Ibaraki), and has the Rokki-dan brutally slaughter all of the sailors and begin sinking the boats. On the last boat they encounter Makie. After an initial skirmish, Habaki believes they will be defeated but Makie falls, coughing up blood. Habaki prepares to kill her, but Manji appears and saves her at Rin's request. The pending confrontation is interrupted by a volley of arrows fired from ships which have just sailed into the port.
23	"Act Twenty Three – 100 Spectacular Dances" (Japanese: 焉舞百景 ─えんぶひゃっけい─)	Kenzen	March 18, 2020
Arrows are fired from ships offshore so everyone runs for cover. Rin slips and falls behind, but Anotsu appears and saves her. They meet up with Makie and Manji, who scolds Rin for putting herself in danger. Habaki assigns Arashino to target Manji and Rin and everyone else to attack Makie, whilst he will fight Anotsu alone. Elsewhere, Magatsu finds the badly wounded Ryo in the snow and rescues her. Arashino cuts Manji to pieces, but Rin again throws herself in the way and pleads for his life. She tells Arashino she only wishes to see Anotsu dead and then will gladly die but he accuses her of stalling. Rin points out that Manji is still bleeding out so he cannot possibly heal. Satisfied, Arashino walks away but realizes that Rin has slit her own wrist. Suddenly, ignited oil is thrown on him and Manji attacks, severing Arashino's arms before killing him. Makie defeats her opponents but Giichi arrives. Makie severs Giichi's hand, leading Hyakurin to jump in. However, Giichi rebukes her and surrenders to Makie asking for their lives. Makie leaves. Meanwhile, Anotsu and Habaki brutally fight until Anotsu takes Habaki's only eye and they fall off the mountain. Ryo arrives and intercedes on behalf of a disorientated Habaki, but he insists on fighting and pushes her down. Makie approaches them and is suddenly felled by a volley of gunshots.
24	"Final Act – Blade of the Immortal" (Japanese: 無限の住人)	Makoto Fukami	March 25, 2020
The people shooting at the group are revealed to be working for Hanabusa, including the shinobi Meguro and Tanpopo. Although, badly wounded and dying, Makie attacks Hanabusa's small force, killing them all. Hanabusa flees through the snow, but is captured by Anotsu and sliced in two, with the tacit approval of Habaki. Anotsu and a blind Habaki then face off to continue their duel, but Habaki is killed in Anotsu's first attack. Manji then fights Anotsu to fulfill his promise to Rin, who is watching, supported by Hyakurin, as she is suffering severe blood loss. Manji, defeats Anotsu, severing his right arm but allows him to live. Manji explains he will tell Rin that Anotsu is dead, telling him never to return. However, as Anotsu boards a ship to depart, Rin suddenly appears, rushes forward and fatally stabs him. Magatsu, who wasn't on the ship, becomes a farmer and Renzo studies art under master Sori, though yet unable to forgive Rin. Far away, in the Shimbara region, Isaku and Doa settle down and also begin farming, joined later by Ozuhan, while Manji is banished from Edo. After paying her respects at her family's grave, Rin decides to apologize to the family members of the Ittō-ryū that she and Manji killed, and the heavily pregnant Hyakurin offers to accompany her. Considering her journey thus far, Rin breaks down. Eighty years after the end of the Shogunate (in 1948), in the city of Tokyo, Manji buries his weapons watched by Yaobikuni and he recalls his encounter with the Ittō-ryū only as a vague memory. Yaobikuni asks him to protect Fuyu, the grandchild of an old friend whose family is engaged in a dispute over leadership. After the young girl hands him a carved knife and drawing, he realizes that she is Rin's great-great-granddaughter and he agrees as they set off on their journey.
