= Blade of the Immortal (film) =

2017 film by Takashi Miike

- Japanese film poster
- Japanese: 無限の住人
- Directed by: Takashi Miike
- Screenplay by: Tetsuya Oishi
- Based on: Blade of the Immortal by Hiroaki Samura
- Produced by: Jeremy Thomas; Misako Saka; Shigeji Maeda
- Starring: Takuya Kimura; Hana Sugisaki; Sota Fukushi; Hayato Ichihara; Erika Toda; Kazuki Kitamura; Chiaki Kuriyama; Shinnosuke Mitsushima; Ken Kaneko; Yoko Yamamoto; Ichikawa Ebizō XI; Min Tanaka; Tsutomu Yamazaki
- Cinematography: Nobuyasu Kita
- Edited by: Kenji Yamashita
- Music by: Koji Endo
- Production companies: Warner Bros. Japan; OLM, Inc.; Recorded Picture Company; CJ E&M; Filosophia; GyaO; Ken-On; Kodansha; Sega Sammy Entertainment; TV Asahi
- Distributed by: Warner Bros. Pictures (Japan); HanWay Films; Arrow Films (United Kingdom); CJ E&M (South Korea)
- Release dates: 29 April 2017 (Japan); 8 October 2017 (United Kingdom); 14 October 2017 (South Korea)
- Running time: 141 minutes
- Countries: Japan; United Kingdom; South Korea
- Language: Japanese
- Box office: $8.4 million

Blade of the Immortal (Japanese: 無限の住人, Hepburn: Mugen no Jūnin) is a 2017 samurai action film starring Takuya Kimura and Hana Sugisaki and directed by Takashi Miike. It is based on the manga series Blade of the Immortal by Hiroaki Samura. The narrative focuses on the immortal samurai Manji (Kimura) who becomes the bodyguard of an orphan teenager named Rin Asano (Sugisaki) as they go on a journey of vengeance against the members of the Ittō-ryū samurai who killed the child's parents.

Miike explored different themes in the story, such as revenge, but in a more complex manner, as he saw Manji as a "dark hero", while the production team found it difficult to write multiple fight scenes to fit the film's duration. The director chose Kimura for the role of Manji due to the actor's popularity, something which he felt was similar to that of the manga. Sugisaki, on the other hand, was chosen for her energetic role in a commercial. The film premiered out of competition at the 2017 Cannes Film Festival, and was released theatrically in Japan by Warner Bros. Pictures on 29 April 2017.

Grossing $8.4 million at the box office, the film failed to meet expectations; however, the film received generally positive reviews from critics for the handling of the fight scenes and the relationship between the two protagonists. It also achieved good sales in Japan and abroad with its home media release. Samura expressed satisfaction when watching the final product.

== Plot ==
Manji is a samurai on the run after following his superior's order to kill a corrupt lord and his followers. Manji chose to care for his now insane sister Machi. While on the run, Machi is found being held hostage by a large group of rōnin out for a bounty on Manji's head. When Manji does comply with the rōnins' demands, they proceed to kill Machi. In retaliation Manji kills every member of the group, but is mortally wounded. As there was nothing left to live for, he accepts his death, but Yaobikuni implants "sacred bloodworms" into his body, which heal him.

52 years later: Manji is now an ageless immortal, who is approached by a young girl named Rin Asano who requests his aid as a bodyguard to help avenge the death of her father, Kurose, at the hands of Kagehisa Anotsu and the Ittō-ryū, a society of samurai assassins whom he leads. While Manji reluctantly agrees when an Ittō-ryū member Sabato Kuroi who had the severed head of Rin's mother mounted on his left shoulder. Word of Sabato's death reaches Kagehisa after setting up the Ittō-ryū's contract with Kagimura Habaki for a place in the shogunate, sending Taito Magatsu to deal with Rin and her bodyguard.

Magatsu is defeated, but is spared as he reveals Manji's immortality to the other Ittō-ryū members. Manji later encounters the Ittō-ryū member Eiku Shizuma, but is defeated. Manji and Rin later arrive in Fukagawa where they encounter Kagehisa's loyal follower Makie Otono-Tachibana. While Makie had the upper hand, she cannot not bring herself to kill Manji. She reveals that she has been wondering if she is fighting for the right cause and that she has thought of leaving the group. Rin intervenes, telling her that she seeks vengeance because of the death of his parents whom she loved and Makie leaves them quietly.

The duo later encounter the Mugai-ryū, learning that Kagehisa is going to Mt. Takeo to recruit a dojo master. Mugai-ryū's member Shira attacks Rin after she intervened in his attempt to rape a prostitute that the Ittō-ryū hired to pose as Kagehisa. Just as he is about to kill her, Manji cuts off his hand, but lets him run away. Following Rin's encounter with the real Kagehisa, learning that Kagehisa's actions were influenced by the history between their grandfathers Takayoshi Asano and Saburō Anotsu, Rin leaves Manji to continue her hunt alone while he tries to find her.

When Kagehisa arrives at Mt. Takao he is betrayed by Habaki, who has set up an ambush. Separately, Manji and Makie arrive soon after, resulting in an epic all-out battle as Makie sacrifices herself against gunfire from samurai in order to protect Kagehisa. Meanwhile, after killing hundreds on another part of the same battlefield while Kagehisa is being betrayed, Manji runs off after Shira as he abducts Rin as revenge for Manji previously chopping off his hand. Shira demands that Manji disarm himself, but Manji is mindful of Shira's duplicity; he uses a small concealed dart to cut through the rope with which Rin is tied.

They engage in a fist fight and Manji sends Shira spiraling to his death off a cliff. Although weakened and bloodied, Kagehisa kills Habaki, and then he encounters Manji who in the end defeats him. Rin is offered to deliver the killing blow for vengeance, but hesitates. Kagehisa warns her that his descendants will come after them if he lives, to which Rin responds by killing him. Despite his wounds, Manji survives the battle with Rin.

== Cast ==
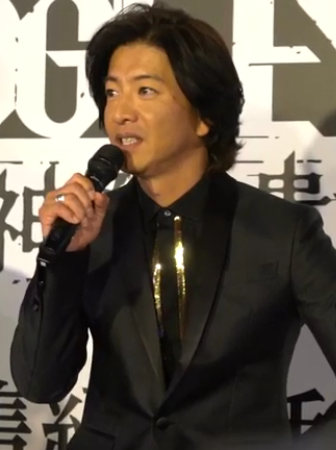
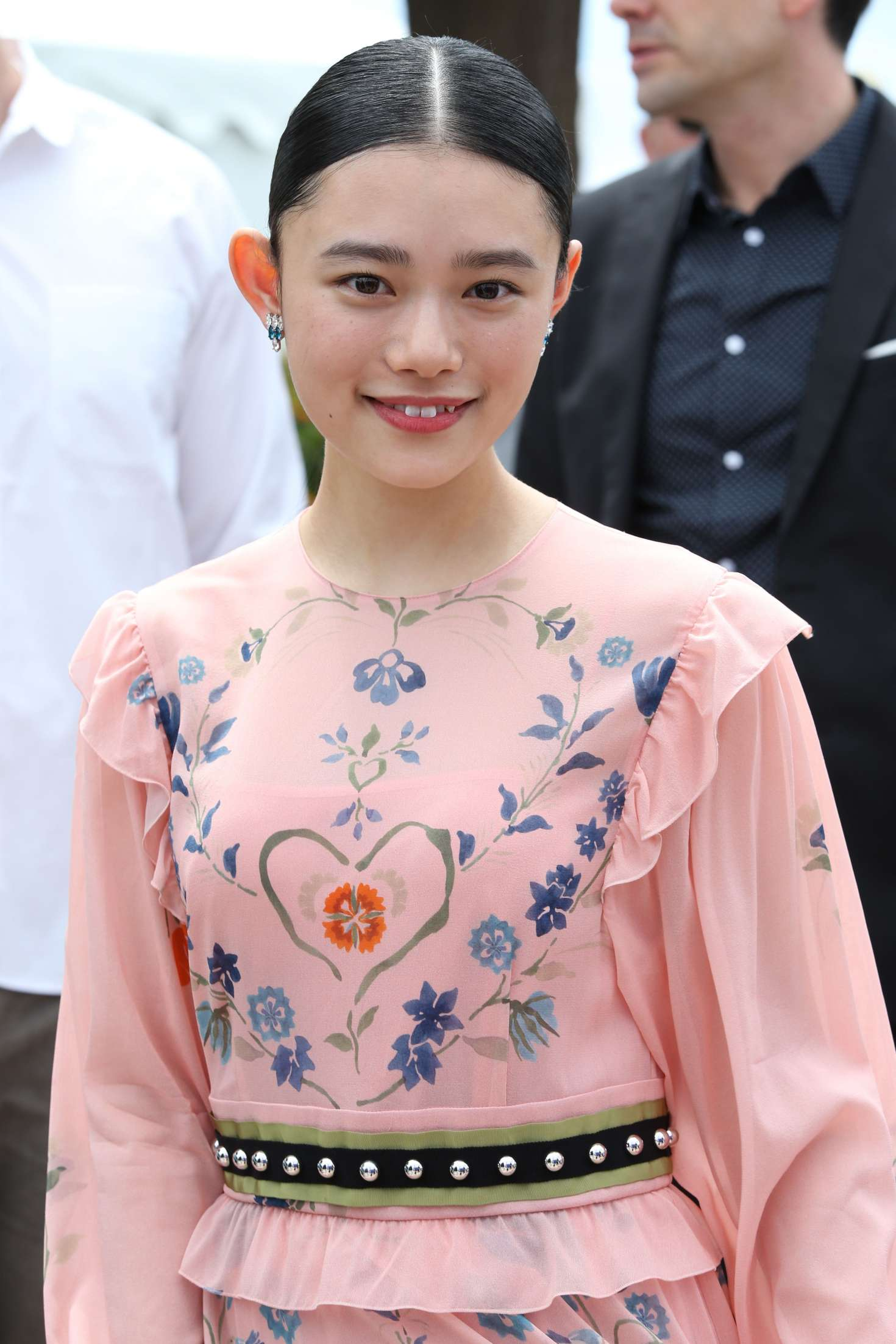
Takuya Kimura (left) and Hana Sugisaki (right) portray the characters.
- Takuya Kimura as Manji
- Hana Sugisaki as Rin Asano / Machi
- Sota Fukushi as Kagehisa Anotsu
- Hayato Ichihara as Shira
- Erika Toda as Makie Otono-Tachibana
- Kazuki Kitamura as Sabato Kuroi
- Chiaki Kuriyama as Hyakurin
- Shinnosuke Mitsushima as Taito Magatsu
- Ken Kaneko as Hishiyasu Shido
- Yoko Yamamoto as Yaobikuni
- Ichikawa Ebizō XI as Eiku Shizuma
- Seizō Fukumoto as Swordsmith
- Min Tanaka as Kagimura Habaki
- Masayuki Deai as Uruma
- Tsutomu Yamazaki as Kensui Ibane
- Takashi Kitadai as Giichi
- Renji Ishibashi as Sosuke Abayama

== Production ==
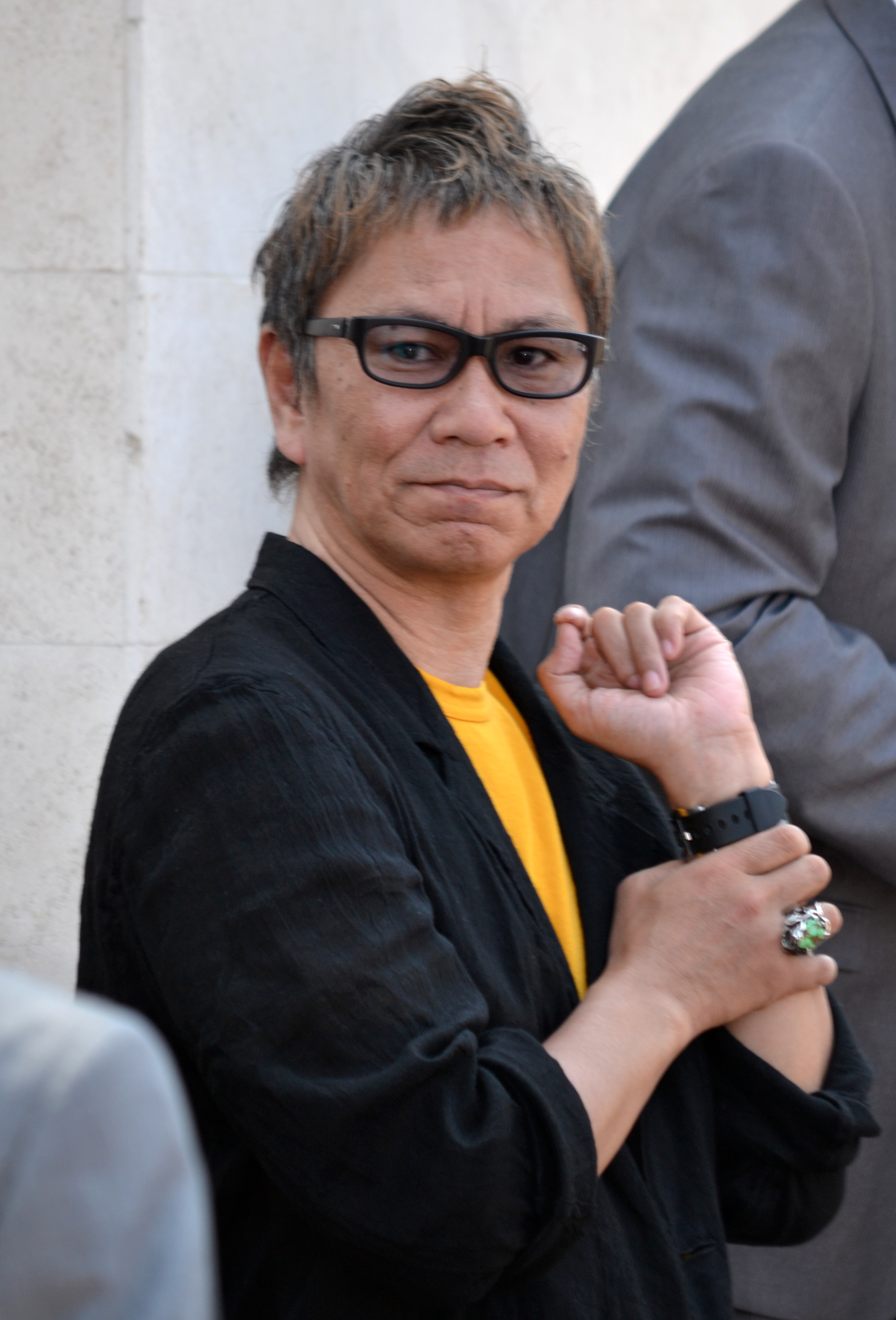
Director Takashi Miike reached his 100th work with the film.

The film was produced and advertised as the 100th film in the career of Miike. Miike was not aware of this goal as he claims he was always busy when developing films but felt satisfied with Blade of the Immortal reaching the 100th movie. Miike wanted to make a samurai movie based on the lack of this genre in Japan as well as the amount of time Blade of the Immortal has finished its serialization by the time he considered grabbing its story to adapt as a film.

The themes of revenge explored in the film were something that Miike paralleled with his own career as both do not seem to reach a conclusion. Miike noted that one of the biggest challenges of adapting the manga was the large amount of characters featured in the story and how Manji would often not be present. As a result, Miike decided the stuff should condense the plot from the original manga to make a proper film story. He was attracted to Samura's work based on his handling of characters such as villains who offer a realistic characterization, Manji being "dark hero" and the detailed artwork. The final fight scene was the most difficult part the studio found difficult to make and was done in Kyoto. Nevertheless, he felt that all the actors were committed to their characters during shooting of movie.

The special features featurette titled "Mangi and the 300", indicates that the hyperviolence of Blade of the Immortal was modeled in part on the film version of 300 from several years prior dealing with the Spartans. It was announced in October 2015. Miike was interested by Samura's manga and thus wanted to create a product that would please the manga author. He was mostly impressed by the reverse ideas in regards to the themes of "light" and "dark", explaining that the main characters did not have a stereotypical appeal commonly found in fiction.

Miike cast Kimura for the role as he found him fitting due to Kimura's personal life and the differences he has with the other members of the music group SMAP. Additionally, since Kimura was also popular within Japanese fandom for over two decades by the time the film was made, he felt that his appeal would attract a bigger audience. When originally thinking Kimura playing the role of Manji, Miike received negative commentaries by his coworkers stating the actor would not play it. However, Miike still felt that due to Kimura's experience in films, he has suitable to play the leading role in the movie. He further claimed ""in order to get those in the movie, using the character of Manji was absolutely instrumental." He said that he personally selected Kimura, "a superstar who made the transition from the Showa era to the Heisei era," as "the world's strongest member of the Miike Gang, the Ittō-ryū fighting school of our film industry."

Kimura expressed multiple thoughts about his acting as Manji, such as how he deals with make up and action sequences. Kimura suffered a major wound while filming, resulting in him not being able to walk for various days. Hana Sugisaki was cast as Rin Asano based on a TV commercial for instant Chinese stir fry food. Miike found the actress did a justifying work in the commercial, inspiring him for such enthusiasm. The theme song of the film, "Live to Die Another Day", is performed by Miyavi, whom Miike noted he had a good relationship with Kimura due to their similar careers.

== Release ==
Blade of the Immortal was released theatrically in Japan by Warner Bros. Pictures on 29 April 2017. It was suggested that the film's weak box office performance may have been due to the disbanding of the music group SMAP, which actor Takuya Kimura was part of.

=== Home media ===
In Japan, the initial Blu-ray and DVD Set Premium Edition sold 8,930 copies to rank #3 on the overall Blu-ray Disc chart. The regular edition was #11 with 2,326 copies. The DVD Deluxe Edition for the live-action reached 8,896 copies. The Blu-ray deluxe edition for the live-action reached 20,383 copies.

In the United States, the film grossed over $830,000 from Blu-ray and DVD sales as of April 2022. In the United Kingdom, it was 2018's third best-selling foreign language film on home video (below the Japanese anime films My Neighbor Totoro and Your Name).

== Reception ==
The review aggregation website Rotten Tomatoes gives the film an 86% approval rating, based on reviews from 93 critics with an average rating of 7 out of 10. The website's critical consensus reads, "Blade of the Immortal highlights Takashi Miike's flair for balletic violence, combining what it gives in strict originality with rich characterizations and kinetic thrills." The film has a score of 72 out of 100 on Metacritic (based on 26 critics), indicating "generally favorable reviews".

Austin Film Critics later nominated the film alongside Makoto Shinkai's anime film Your Name which was announced as the winners of January 8, 2018.

Critics focused on the large amount of action. Jordan Hoffman of The Guardian gave the film four stars out of five, noting that "the fun really shines when the film revels in the outlandish weapons: enormous double-pronged swords, an axe that looks more like a sharp anvil, blades attached to staffs, blades attached to chains, shurikens for all occasions, etc. ... if you are going to see one outlandish and occasionally nauseating bloodbath samurai pic this year, this is the one". Harry Windsor of The Hollywood Reporter found the film to be "less memorable" than 13 Assassins, but that "there are still pleasures to be had, particularly for those fond of long but expertly choreographed sword fights with regular, and bloody, dismemberments." Variety described it as a departure from Miike's previous samurai films due to the level of gore, while praising the large amount of fight scenes. The plot was noted to take advantage of supernatural elements in order to focus on battles, with the writer describing the film as a chanbara genre.

Blu Ray compared the supernatural powers possessed by protagonist Manji to those of the titular characters in the films Logan and 1986's Highlander due to the portrayal of immortal fighters. Japan Times highly praised Kimura's work for his emotional and physical scenes despite not being at his prime in the film, comparing him to Tom Cruise. Although IGN criticized Manji's and Rin's journey for being an excuse to battle a large amount of characters, the reviewer enjoyed their relationship, also comparing them to Logan while also being self-aware of the idea of revenge.

In May 2017, Hiroaki Samura stated that he rejected Hollywood's suggestions for a live-action adaptation due to the changes Westerns tend to make. In regards to Miike's film, he had this to say:

When a film adaptation is made, it is often criticized by the fans of the original, but rather, I have more fun when arrangements are made. As a film, it was completed with perfect quality. I think it was made as I expected.

== Accolades ==
Award	Category	Nominee	Result
12th Asian Film Awards	Best Supporting Actress	Hana Sugisaki	Nominated
13th Austin Film Critics Association Awards	Best Foreign Language Film	Blade of Immortal	Nominated
