= List of Blade of the Immortal episodes =

Blade of the Immortal is an anime series based on the manga series by Hiroaki Samura. It was directed by Kōichi Mashimo and produced by Bee Train, with production support by Production I.G and Pony Canyon. Bee Train was responsible for the animation production, Pony Canyon produced the music for the series, and Yoshimitsu Yamashita designed the characters. The story follows the adventures of Manji, a samurai cursed with immortality due to killing one hundred men. Weary of his immortal life, Manji seeks to repent for sins and lift the curse of immortality by killing 1,000 evil men.

The first announcement of the Blade of the Immortal anime was in Kodansha's Monthly Afternoon magazine. The series aired from July 14, 2008, to December 29, 2008, on AT-X.

Seven DVD compilation volumes were released by Pony Canyon between August 29, 2008, and February 27, 2009, followed by a DVD-box on November 11, 2010.

A second anime adaptation was listed on the cover of the July issue of Monthly Afternoon on May 25, 2019. It was later announced that the anime adaptation will be a complete adaptation. The series is animated by Liden Films and directed by Hiroshi Hamasaki, with Makoto Fukami handling series composition, Shingo Ogiso designing the characters, and Eiko Ishibashi composing the music. It aired from October 10, 2019, to March 25, 2020, on Amazon Prime Video. On October 15, 2020, Sentai Filmworks announced that they had licensed the anime for home video and released it on Blu-ray Disc on January 19, 2021.

== Episodes ==
=== 2008 series ===
| No. | Title | Original release date |
|---|---|---|
| 1 | "Criminal"; Transliteration: "Togabito" (Japanese: 罪人) | July 14, 2008 |
Manji visits a priest to confess his sins of killing his lord and one hundred of his retainers. The priest, is actually a bounty hunter named Johnny Gyobutsu who shoots Manji in the forehead, but Manji regenerates the wound and then kills Johnny. Manji returns to his home to Yaobikuni who placed "sacred bloodworms" into Manji which make him immortal, and his sister Machi who has regressed to a childlike mindset. That evening, Machi dreams of the time Manji was forced to kill her husband, a police officer who was pursuing him. She wanders off into the night and is captured by a group of rōnin led by the Hishiyasu Shido brother of Johnny. As Machi is released, Hishiyasu kills her and in response, Manji kills every member of the rōnin group. Upon returning to Yaobikuni, declares that he will seek redemption for the hundred men he killed by killing one thousand evil men. In the final scene, a woman is shown at a grave-site, swearing to take revenge.
| 2 | "Conquest"; Transliteration: "Seifuku" (Japanese: 征服) | July 28, 2008 |
The woman praying at the grave is revealed to be Rin Asano seeking revenge for her father's murder. Rin recounts the tragic demise of her family's dojo by the Ittō-ryū to Yaobikuni, who sends her to seek Manji. Meanwhile, the Mugai-ryū has received word about Manji' appearance, unsure whether he is an ally or a foe. Rin tries to convince Manji to help her defeat the Ittō-ryū, but he needs to know which side is just. Rin tells Manji about the demise of the Mutenichi-ryū at the hands of Kagehisa Anotsu and the Ittō-ryū. Kagehisa tells how his grandfather Saburō Anotsu and Rin's grandfather Takayoshi Asano, were competing for the license of the Mutenichi-ryū dojo fifty years earlier. A group of bandits interrupted the match, and Takayoshi killed four of them while Saburō killed eight. However, Saburō is expelled from the dojo for using a foreign blade. Years later, Anotsu claims that the Ittō-ryū will take over the dojo and Sabato Kuroi murders Kurose and his wife is stabbed, but killed by Kuroi before she is violated. Manji then agrees to assist Rin in her revenge on the Ittō-ryū, but as they depart, Yaobikuni questions whether Manji would save Rin, or vice versa.
| 3 | "Love Song"; Transliteration: "Koiuta" (Japanese: 恋詠) | August 11, 2008 |
Rin encounters Sabato Kuroi at a riverbank, who declares his love for her and voices that love is eternal through death in the same way that he killed her mother. However, Manji arrives and cooperate with Rin to overpower Kuroi. When Kuroi's face is exposed, the heads of both his former wife and Rin's mother are shown attached to each of his shoulders. Kuroi delivers a fatal blow to Manji's chest and he collapses. Sabato offers his life in exchange for Rin's as proof of his love for her. However, Manji revives and stabs Kuroi's back just as Rin is about to commit suicide. Kuroi attacks Manji, frustrated by his immorality and Kuroi suddenly decides to kill Rin, but is killed by Manji. Later, Manji reminds Rin of her main objective, which is to prevent Anotsu from taking over the dojo. Meanwhile, as Anotsu is conversing with Kagimura Habaki, he accepts the wager proposed to unite people from different fighting styles into one unique group.
| 4 | "Genius"; Transliteration: "Tensai" (Japanese: 天才) | August 25, 2008 |
Manji and Rin visit the famous swordsman and artist Master Sori to enlist his aid for revenge on the Ittō-ryū. Rin tries to convince him to join her, revealing that she is aware that he is a spy for the shogunate. He admits that he only supports the shogunate so he can pursue the forbidden Western art style and Manji storms out of the house, disgraced by his excuses. Rin wakes from a dream, to find Sori's house surrounded by followers of the Ittō-ryū. Manji tries to fend them off but is trapped against spikes on a tree. Master Sori, looking for a shade of red to complete his drawing, is overjoyed when a stray drop of blood provides the color he's looking for. Rin unsuccessfully tries to fight off one of the followers, and just as she is about to be killed, Master Sori stabs the follower through the throat. Anotsu kills the remaining two followers on their return to Ittō-ryū for disobeying the rule of one-on-one matches. Master Sori comments how similar he and Manji are, and later gives Rin a sack of money as payment for providing the right color to complete his masterpiece.
| 5 | "Fanatic"; Transliteration: "Shūjin" (Japanese: 執人) | September 8, 2008 |
Taito Magatsu, a member of the Ittō-ryū, decides to leave and lead a normal life. O-Ren, his prostitute lover reluctantly wishes him well. When Rin takes Manji's unusual weapons to a blacksmith for sharpening, she sees Magatsu's Western sword and begs Magatsu to sell it to her. He agrees if she can tell him where to find the daughter of the Asano dojo, suspecting that she is that girl. Rin explains to Manji that this sword was once in the possession of her father Kurose before the Ittō-ryū raided the dojo. Later, when two men carry Magatsu in a covered litter toward the Ittō-ryū dojo, they stab him, but he retaliates and they die before revealing their employer. After he arrives at the dojo, Anotsu tells him that the Ittō-ryū will be a branch of the shogunate, regaining their former status, however Magatsu tells Anotsu that he wants to quit. Manji sees Rin crying in her sleep over the death of her parents, and he decides to retrieve the sword for her. Manji later encounters Magatsu in a nearby forest, and demands the sword. Magatsu, using the sword which separates into three sections, defeats Manji after stabbing him multiple times. However Manji recovers enough to stab Magatsu and recover the sword components which he takes back for Rin, before collapsing.
| 6 | "Cry of the Worm"; Transliteration: "Mushi no Uta" (Japanese: 蟲の唄) | September 22, 2008 |
Kusano Kene, a secondary military officer of the Ittō-ryū encounters a beautiful geisha being harassed by her husband in the street. Kusano saves her and walks away to an okiya where the same woman offers him food and drink. Although he is suspicious, she successfully poisons him and then shoots him in the head with her crossbow. Removing her disguise she is revealed as Hyakurin and her husband as Shinriji from the Mugai-ryū. Elsewhere, Giichi has Morozumi Chogou, another Ittō-ryū member by the throat with a chained double blade. Giichi extracts from him the number of masters within the clan before slicing Morozumi's head off. Meanwhile, Manji and Rin stop at an inn to rest where Manji encounters Eiku Shizuma, who offers to team up with Manji to take down Anotsu, but Manji declines. Shizuma suddenly stabs Manji in the chest, and Manji simultaneously stabs him in the back, revealing that Shizuma is immortal like Manji. Manji realizes later that Shizuma's dagger was poisoned after his sacred bloodworms do not appear and as he cries out in pain that night as blood spews from fissures his body.
| 7 | "Three Ways"; Transliteration: "Sanzu" (Japanese: 三途) | October 6, 2008 |
Rin gives Manji some pills to neutralize the poison in his body and although he initially rejects the idea, he eventually takes them. Rin tries to find a doctor late at night, and meets an old woman disguised as Yaobikuni who offers to aid her. However it is a trap set up by Shizuma to kidnap Rin. Shizuma returns the old woman's grandchild to her as part of his bargain, but then to Rin's horror he kills her. Shizuma tells Rin that he served under a military commander two hundred years ago during the Sengoku period where eventually, his family, his unit, the officer and his lord all died in battle, leaving nothing. Shizuma offers Rin some of his blood, which could make her immortal, but Manji interrupts them. He and Shizuma fight mercilessly and Manji declines Shizuma's offer a second time to work with him to overthrow Anotsu. Shizuma poisons his sword once again, but when Rin creates a distraction, Manji attacks, impaling Shizuma on his own poisoned sword. Shizuma tells Manji that Anotsu is in Fukagawa before he passes away. Rin tells Manji that immortality may not be the solution and may only bring sadness.
| 8 | "Nail Bomb"; Transliteration: "Tsumabiki" (Japanese: 爪弾) | October 20, 2008 |
Manji and Rin wander in the city of Fukagawa in search of Anotsu. Manji encounters an appealing prostitute but finds a knife hidden in her cloak. She reveals herself as Makie Otono-Tachibana, before she attacks him with a disjointed spear. He easily defeats her and spares her life after assuming she is an amateur, to weak to pose a threat. At an okiya, a man recognizes Makie from a brothel in another district after hearing her sing and play music, but is chastised by the owner as she is now a geisha. Meanwhile, Rin is seemingly jealous because Manji left with Makie and she tries to look more attractive for him. However, Manji laughs at her clumsy attempt at seduction and Rin hits him with a saki bottle as a consequence. In a quiet moment on a bridge, Makie tells Anotsu that she just wants an ordinary life and not to live as a swordswoman or a geisha, but as the daughter of a samurai which is not possible. Anotsu confesses his love for her, but she believes that he mainly wants her for her talents as a woman and a fighter. After Anotsu leaves, three swordsmen arrive and attempt to take Makie back to her former brothel, but she easily slays them all.
| 9 | "Dream Bomb"; Transliteration: "Yumebiki" (Japanese: 夢弾) | November 3, 2008 |
When Anotsu was a child, Makie saved him from a wild dog, but his grandfather Saburō berated him for cowardice. He beat Makie tied and tied her to a tree because she was the daughter of a rival clan, Anotsu resolved to create a new superior fighting style which would value victory over principles and honor. Back in the present, Makie challenges Manji and they fight viciously in the narrow laneways where earns Manji's grudging respect she as the superior fighter. Manji tries to ambush her, but Makie dodges him, slashing off his right arm and impaling him with his own sword. Makie hesitates, shocked by her own brutality, but Manji convinces her to keep fighting and Manji is defeated. Rin arrives to defend him and Makie questions how much blood will be shed on behalf of Rin's revenge. Rin responds by saying that bloodshed is more humane than trickery. Manji is embarrassed to admit that Rin has saved him a second time and that their lives are intertwined. Makie departs, encountering "sister" O-Hatsu who is returning to the red-light district but declines to join her. Manji is embarrassed to admit that Rin has saved him a second time and that their lives are intertwined. Rejecting her past life as a geisha and accepting her present life as a samurai, Makie leaves the Ittō-ryū and bids her last farewell to Anotsu who has lost another fighter.
| 10 | "Changing Face"; Transliteration: "Kawarimen" (Japanese: 變面) | November 17, 2008 |
At a festival, Rin has frustrating encounters outside a tokoroten vendor and at a mochi food stand where an adolescent male named Renzo Kawakami tests her patience. However, she recalls to what Makie had said about the futility of revenge and tolerates their rude behaviour. Meanwhile, Manji encounters Araya Kawakami at a mask shop. Manji lend his sword to Kawakami who paints a mask with his own blood to give to a young boy as a gift. Kawakami reveals that he was a member of the Ittō-ryū but avoids a confrontation with Manji when his son Renzo appears. After the festival, a man unfairly blames Renzo for breaking one of his sandals. Rin defends Renzo and offers to fix his sandal. She mentions the Asano dojo, but this causes the man to mock the family name. He rudely begins to sneak his foot under her kimono, but Rin manages to fix the sandal before he has the chance to venture too far. She later accepts Renzo's invitation to his family house for tea and purposely goes without her sword. She meets his father Araya Kawakami, who thanks Rin for helping Renzo get out of trouble. When asked about her family, she begins to tell him about the murder of her parents two years earlier.
| 11 | "Feathers"; Transliteration: "Hane" (Japanese: 羽根) | December 1, 2008 |
Kawakami realizes that Rin is the daughter of the Asano couple he killed two years earlier and sends Renzo away to fetch more tea. Rin confronts Kawakami, emotionally telling him of her father being murdered and her mother being violated. She asks for an apology, but he refuses her request. Kawakami then assaults her, but Rin stabs him in the arm. With Rin held down and defenceless, Kawakami uses his own blood to paint on her body. Manji arrives as Kawakami is about to strangle her. The two men duel in the room, and Kawakami is able to remove most of Manji's weapons. Kawakami again attacks Rin as she regains consciousness, but Manji intercepts him and pierces his heart with his double-blade knife. Suddenly, Renzo returns and after seeing his father dead, spears Manji. Hiding the truth, Manji tells Renzo he is pursuing a gambling debt. To dissuade Renzo from pursuing Manji for revenge, Rin convinces Renzo that Manji is dead after showing him Manji's arm buried in the ground. Later, she later returns Manji's arm which he re-attaches to his shoulder.
| 12 | "Nemesis of Rin"; Transliteration: "Sharin" (Japanese: 斜凜) | December 15, 2008 |
Anotsu visits Magatsu to check up on him, although Magatsu suspects Anotsu has more on his mind. Manji and Rin travel back to his house where he lived with Machi before her death. While instructing Rin, Manji scolds her for having poor skills. During a break, Manji tells her that practicing swordsmanship in a dojo with wooden swords does not compare with real combat experience. Later, Rin encounters Anotsu training in the nearby forest with an axe. Realizing that she has been detected, she throws all 10 of her knives, only landing one in his shoulder. After her futile assassination attempt, she understands how poor her skills are. Helpless, Rin cries for being unable to kill the man who stands before her. He demonstrates the capabilities of his axe compared to those of the traditional sword. He then discloses to Rin the reasons for the animosity between him and her father was over his desire to break with traditional swordplay and focus on victory. Also how ironic that although wars have died down, dojos have continued to increase, pursuing the old ways. Anotsu releases Rin and returns her weapons to her, explaining that by using her knives, she has already departed from the Mutenichi-ryū tradition. When Anotsu leaves, Rin cries in confusion and despair.
| 13 | "Wind"; Transliteration: "Kaze" (Japanese: 風) | December 29, 2008 |
Hyakurin commissions Shira to kill Magatsu who has left O-Ren again for a while. Anotsu receives a letter saying that the Shingyoutou-ryū has a similar philosophy to the Ittō-ryū. Shira returns, and casually tells Hyakurin that not having found Magatsu, he killed O-Ren, much to her annoyance. Meanwhile, Rin talks to Manji about what Anotsu and Makie have said to her, not knowing what to do and feeling confused. He reminds her that those of the Ittō-ryū who actually took part in the suffering and death of Rin's parents are technically no longer alive. Magatsu returns and sees O-Ren's lifeless body, finally realizing how much she had loved him, while the inn-owner berates him for failing to protect her. Yaobikuni passes by Manji's house and tells Rin that Manji is confused, but that Rin is only hesitating and should be strong and follow her own path. When Manji returns Rin has a newfound conviction to train and pursue her ambition to become a swords-woman. Rin abolishes her hesitations and trains with utter devotion. It is foreshadowed that the Mugai-ryū is tactically preparing to battle against the Ittō-ryū, which Habaki has had under surveillance. The paths taken by all the surviving characters are shown as the episode comes to a close.

=== 2019 series ===
| No. | Title (Note: All English titles are taken from Amazon Prime Video.) | Written by | Original release date |
|---|---|---|---|
| 1 | "Act One – Meeting" (Japanese: 一幕 遭逢 ─そうほう─) | Makoto Fukami | October 10, 2019 |
| 2 | "Act Two – Founding" (Japanese: 二幕 開闢 ─かいびゃく─) | Makoto Fukami | October 10, 2019 |
| 3 | "Act Three – Dream Pangs" (Japanese: 三幕 夢弾 ─ゆめびき─) | Makoto Fukami | October 17, 2019 |
| 4 | "Act Four – Rin at Odds" (Japanese: 四幕 斜凜 ─しゃりん─) | Kenzen | October 24, 2019 |
| 5 | "Act Five – Song of the Bugs" (Japanese: 五幕 蟲の唄 ─むしのうた─) | Makoto Fukami | October 31, 2019 |
| 6 | "Act Six – Wing Roots" (Japanese: 六幕 羽根 ─はね─) | Kenzen | November 7, 2019 |
| 7 | "Act Seven – Evil's Shadow" (Japanese: 七幕 凶影 ─きょうえい─) | Makoto Fukami | November 14, 2019 |
| 8 | "Act Eight – Mugai-ryu" (Japanese: 八幕 無骸流 ─むがいりゅう─) | Kenzen | November 21, 2019 |
| 9 | "Act Nine – Gathering" (Japanese: 九幕 群 ─むら─) | Makoto Fukami | November 28, 2019 |
| 10 | "Act Ten – Animal" (Japanese: 十幕 獣 ─けもの─) | Kenzen | December 5, 2019 |
| 11 | "Act Eleven – Fall Frost" (Japanese: 十一幕 秋霜 ─しゅうそう─) | Makoto Fukami | December 12, 2019 |
| 12 | "Act Twelve – Blood of Finality" (Japanese: 十二幕 終血 ─しゅうけつ─) | Makoto Fukami | December 19, 2019 |
| 13 | "Act Thirteen ─ Twilight" (Japanese: 十三幕 誰そ彼 ─たそかれ─) | Makoto Fukami | December 26, 2019 |
| 14 | "Act Fourteen – Amendments" (Japanese: 十四幕 改起 ─かいき─) | Kenzen | January 2, 2020 |
| 15 | "Act Fifteen – Acquisition of Guts" (Japanese: 十五幕 臓承 ─ぞうしょう─) | Kenzen | January 16, 2020 |
| 16 | "Act Sixteen – Altered Limb" (Japanese: 十六幕 肢転 ─してん─) | Kenzen | January 23, 2020 |
| 17 | "Act Seventeen – Ceremonial Bond" (Japanese: 十七幕 儀結 ─ぎけつ─) | Kenzen | January 30, 2020 |
| 18 | "Act Eighteen – Banshee's Cries" (Japanese: 十八幕 鬼哭 ─きこく─) | Makoto Fukami | February 6, 2020 |
| 19 | "Act Nineteen – Massacre" (Japanese: 鏖 ─みなごろし─) | Makoto Fukami | February 13, 2020 |
| 20 | "Act Twenty – Unending" (Japanese: 霏々 ─ひひ─) | Kenzen | February 27, 2020 |
| 21 | "Act Twenty One – Trap" (Japanese: 陥穽 ─かんせい─) | Kenzen | March 4, 2020 |
| 22 | "Act Twenty Two – Ten Final Pushes" (Japanese: 十掉尾 ─じゅっとうび─) | Makoto Fukami | March 11, 2020 |
| 23 | "Act Twenty Three – 100 Spectacular Dances" (Japanese: 焉舞百景 ─えんぶひゃっけい─) | Kenzen | March 18, 2020 |
| 24 | "Final Act – Blade of the Immortal" (Japanese: 無限の住人) | Makoto Fukami | March 25, 2020 |
