= Manji (Blade of the Immortal) =

- Blade of the Immortal character
- Manji as illustrated by Hiroaki Samura
- First appearance: Blade of the Immortal – "Antelude: Criminal" (1994)
- Created by: Hiroaki Samura
- Voiced by: Japanese: Tomokazu Seki (2008 series); Kenjiro Tsuda (2019 series); English: Keith Silverstein (2008 series); Andrew Love (2019 series)
- Portrayed by: Takuya Kimura (2017 film)

In-universe information
- Full name: Manji
- Title(s): The Immortal; Mr. Murderhands
- Family: Machi Saitō (sister)
- Relatives: Tatsumasa Saitō (brother-in-law)

Manji, also known as The Immortal, is a character from the manga series Blade of the Immortal by Hiroaki Samura. A swordsman who was cursed by worms that give him immortality, Manji goes on a journey to get rid of his immortality and acts as a bodyguard for the orphan Rin due to how similar he finds her to his late sister. In addition to appearing in the manga, Manji has appeared in two animated adaptations of the series in 2008 and 2019, where he is respectively voiced by Tomokazu Seki and Kenjiro Tsuda in Japanese, and Keith Silverstein and Andrew Love in English, as well in as a live-action film in 2017, played by Takuya Kimura.

Samura created Manji as an ideal hero who would show always his strong form rather than a weakness. Critical reception to the character has been generally positive, aimed towards his fight scenes and relationship with Rin. He has also been compared with Marvel Comics' character Wolverine based on their similar traits like their rapid regeneration, and adapted as Wolverine in the American comic book series Spider-Gwen.

== Creation ==
The protagonist Manji, the author was drawn a totally straight, unvarnished version of his Samura's ideal hero: "a person who never reveals his or her own weaknesses to others, but who at the same time is not as unassailable powerful as he or she may seem". The character's immortality curse is meant to give a contrast to escapist heroes. This was influenced by 1960s's manga protagonists "possessing supernatural power as well as and "the loss and sorrow of having to live with that power" as an element of two sides of the same coin. As a result, Samura conceived the idea an immortal protagonist whom the readers would not like to become.

In "flipping" the English version is Manji's clothing, which features a manji symbol, that if the pages were "flipped" would resemble specifically the Nazi swastika, instead of the ancient Eurasian swastika (that can be of any orientation), which for many cultures represents concepts such as peace and harmony.

== Fictional character biography ==
As the series opens, Manji and Machi have somewhat settled down in Edo with Yaobikuni and O-Yō. After an encounter with Shido "Johnny" Goybutsu, a bounty hunter disguised as a priest, Manji begins to question the purpose of his immortality. That same night he awakens to discover that Shido Hishiyasu, brother of "Johnny" Goybutsu, has kidnapped Machi in an attempt to force a confrontation between himself and Manji so that he can avenge his brother. Manji returns to Yaobikuni the next day with a proposal, to make amends for the 100 "good men" that he killed before, Manji will kill 1000 "evil men" and then the Kessen-Chu will leave his body.

Some time later a young woman, Asano Rin, arrives at Manji's hut seeking his aid in avenging the murder of her parents at the hands of a renegade sword school, the Itto-Ryu. Eventually, due to the fact that Rin bears a resemblance to his deceased sister, Manji does agree to protect her on her quest. Soon after, the duo have their first encounter with a member of the Itto-Ryu. For the past two years love letters had been arriving at the Asano dojo addressed to Rin, using these the two track down Kuroi Sabato, a tall Itto-Ryu swordsmen covered head to toe in armor and a long cloak, and confront him one night. Initially Manji hangs back, allowing Rin a chance to confront and get a confession from Kuroi. With his identity confirmed Manji enters the scene, attempting to engage Kuroi in battle only to find that the swordsmen is utterly obsessed with Rin to such a point that he completely ignores Manji. He pushes past Manji, leaving his back wide open for an attack. Manji takes the opening and quickly finds himself cut in two at the waist as Kuroi reveals that he has the ability to rotate his body completely backwards. Manji manages to crawl up behind Kuroi and literally cut him to ribbons.

Shortly after his encounter with Kuroi Sabato, Manji is dragged to the house of a painter by the name of Master Sori. Sori is a long-time friend of Rin's family, and she hopes to convince him to lend his sword to her cause. Manji's no frills blunt manners clash with Sori's more refined and cultured attitude almost instantly and the two exchange verbal jabs at each other several time. At first Sori refuses stating that a humble artist would be of no use, then Rin reveals that she knows the truth behind Sori, that he is not just a painter but a member of Shogunates secret police. This revelation leaves both Sorii and Manji stunned, but again he refuses, this time citing shame at how tainted his sword is due to the various illegal and immoral acts his used it in over the years. Manji sees right this facade and eventually gets Sori to admit that he just cannot be bothered to risk his life while all he wants to do is paint. The two exchange insults again and almost come to blows at one point. The encounter ends with Manji storming off in a huff leaving Rin to spend the night in Sori's place. Together, Manji and Rin battle off the Itto Ryu horde and seem to be in control of the situation until Hage ensnares Manji in an elaborate trap. He forces Manji back against a tree which is covered in a netting of rusty hooks, which sink into Manji's back and hold him there while Hage turns his attention to Rin.

== Powers and abilities ==
Manji uses many weapons, a good number of which came from defeated opponents. His two short, hooked swords are named Shidō ("Four Paths"). His two standard swords are named Imo-no-Kami Tatsumasa ("Sister Defender Tatsumasa"). His two chained scythes are called Mumei ("Nameless"). His double bladed sword-breaker is named Kotengu ("Little Devil"). Most of his weapons are hidden under his shirt, a seemingly impossible feat given their large number, irregular shapes and lack of sheaths. One of Manji's signature tricks is to make any of his hidden weapons drop out of his sleeves into one or both of his waiting hands whenever they are needed.

== In other media ==
=== Anime ===
Tomokazu Seki has voiced and portrayed Manji in the 2008 anime series and play based on the manga.

Kenjiro Tsuda voiced Manji in the 2019 anime series, with Keith Silverstein providing his voice in English.

=== Film ===
For the 2017 live-action film, Takuya Kimura portrayed Manji. Director Takashi Miike cast Kimura for the role as he found him fitting due to Kimura's personal life and the differences he has with the other members of the music group SMAP. Additionally, since Kimura was also popular within Japanese fandom for over two decades by the time the film was made, he felt that his appeal would attract a bigger audience. When originally thinking Kimura playing the role of Manji, Miike received negative commentaries by his coworkers stating the actor would not play it. However, Miike still felt that due to Kimura's experience in films, he has suitable to play the leading role in the film. He further claimed ""in order to get those in the movie, using the character of Manji was absolutely instrumental." Kimura expressed multiple thoughts about his acting as Manji, such as how he deals with make up and action sequences. The special features featurette titled "Mangi and the 300", indicates that the hyperviolence of Blade of the Immortal was modeled in part on the film version of 300 from several years prior dealing with the Spartans. Kimura suffered a major wound while filming, resulting in him not being able to walk for various days.

=== In popular culture ===
In the "Predators" arc of the Marvel Comics series Spider-Gwen by Jason Latour and Robbi Rodriguez, referencing the character often being compared to Wolverine, Manji is featured as the Earth-65 version of Wolverine, dubbed "The Immortal Mr. Murderhands".

In June 2020, CyberConnect2 CEO Hiroshi Matsuyama stated that the video game character Haseo from .hack//G.U., first created for .hack//G.U. Vol.1//Rebirth (2006), was inspired by Manji visually.

== Reception ==
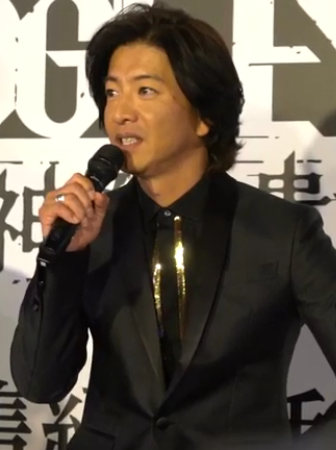
Takuya Kimura has been praised for his role as Manji.

Manji has been a popular character. Otaku USA described Manji's immortality as "less a plot device than a symbol of his world weariness and connection to corrupt forces". The same site praised the character's fight against Shiro for the tention provided by the fact that Manji was missing an arm and thus multiple readers were waiting for the release of the manga volume after a major delay. Jarred Pine from Mania Beyond Entertainment had mixed thoughts in regards to Manji's fights, finding them "pointless" as it served to the character gain the trust from Giichi but praised the resolution due to reuniting the protagonist with Rin. Dark Horse Comics found Rin as a more suitable protagonist from the manga than Manji due to how she matures in the story and becomes stronger. As a result, the editor claimed that Manji is more appealing as a lead in the live-action film. UK Anime Network has a similar opinion due to how most of the narrative revolves around Rin rather than Manji in the first volume of the manga. Anime News Network found that while Manji's imprisonment is filled with negative scenes, his reunion with Rin helped to improve the dark narrative. The site also praised Manji's and Shira's fight but the reasonings behind Manji's immortality were seen as lucky.

=== 2008 anime ===
In regards to the 2008 anime, Anime News Network criticized the lack of explanation behind Manji's curse. On the other hand, Mania Beyond Entertainment felt that both protagonists were properly developed in the series in the early episodes though he did not comment about the curse.

=== 2017 film ===
For the 2017 live-action film, The Guardian compared the duality of Manji and Rin with James Mangold's Logan film. Commenting on Manji's healing powers, the reviewer felt the film took advantage of this as it allowed the staff to delivery notorious gory scenes. Hollywood Reporter agreed, finding Manji's battle against another fighter with healing powers as an opportunity to make the writers execute more violence in the film. The New York Times enjoyed Manji's weaponry as he could wield multiple attacks through his clothing. Although IGN criticized Manji's and Rin's journey for being an excuse to battle a large amount of characters, the reviewer enjoyed their relationship, comparing them to Logan like The Guardian while also being selfaware of the idea of revenge. DVD Talk also compared Manji with the X-Men character Wolverine based on their supernatural powers and also praised the work Takuya Kimura provided in order for his character to be engaged in multiple fight scenes. Another comparison based on Manji's supernatural powers was made by Blu Ray but rather than Logan, the 1986 Highlander film due to the portrayal of immortal fighters. Japan Times highly praised Kimura's work for his emotional and physical scenes despite not being at his prime in the film, comparing him to Tom Cruise.

=== 2019 anime ===
Commenting on the 2019 anime, UK Anime Network said that while the themes explored by Manji and Rin are interesting, the fight scenes the former has are predictable due to the abuse of Manji's healing skills. Scribd regarded Manji's fight sin the reboot as one of the goriest in animation history, comparing the ones with the Netflix anime Devilman Crybaby due to how they might disturb the audience.
