= Die Wergelder =

Japanese manga series

- First tankōbon volume cover

ベアゲルター (Beagerutā)
- Genre: Action; Science fiction; Thriller
- Manga
- Written by: Hiroaki Samura
- Published by: Kodansha
- English publisher: NA: Kodansha USA
- Magazine: Nemesis (2011–2018); Monthly Shōnen Sirius (2018–present)
- Original run: July 7, 2011 – present
- Volumes: 8
- icon

Die Wergelder (Japanese: ベアゲルター, Hepburn: Beagerutā) is a Japanese manga series written and illustrated by Hiroaki Samura. It was serialized in Kodansha's seinen manga magazine Nemesis from July 2011 to August 2018, until the magazine ceased publication, and later moved to Kodansha's shōnen manga magazine Monthly Shōnen Sirius in November of that same year. Its chapters have been collected in eight tankōbon volumes as of September 2026.

== Publication ==
Written and illustrated by Hiroaki Samura, Die Wergelder started in Kodansha's seinen manga magazine Nemesis on July 7, 2011. Nemesis ceased publication after the 41st issue, released on August 9, 2018, and the series resumed in Kodansha's shōnen manga magazine Monthly Shōnen Sirius on November 26 of that same year. Kodansha has collected its chapters into individual tankōbon volumes. The first volume was released on February 22, 2013. As of September 9, 2026, eight volumes have been released.

In North America, the manga has been licensed for English release by Kodansha USA and published in a 2-in-1 omnibus edition.

=== Volumes ===
No.	Original release date	Original ISBN	English release date	English ISBN
1	February 22, 2013	978-4-06-376383-6	December 29, 2015	978-1-63236-195-0
2	May 22, 2015	978-4-06-376532-8	December 29, 2015	978-1-63236-195-0
3	November 22, 2016	978-4-06-390665-3	January 15, 2019	978-1-63236-196-7
4	July 23, 2018	978-4-06-511949-5	January 15, 2019	978-1-63236-196-7
5	April 9, 2020	978-4-06-518446-2	December 20, 2022	978-1-64651-027-6
6	March 9, 2022	978-4-06-526955-8	December 20, 2022	978-1-64651-027-6
7	January 9, 2024	978-4-06-534158-2	—	—
8	September 9, 2026	978-4-06-544766-6	—	—
