= Ohikkoshi =

Japanese manga series

- Tankōbon volume cover

おひっこし
- Genre: Romantic comedy
- Manga
- Written by: Hiroaki Samura
- Published by: Kodansha
- English publisher: NA: Dark Horse Comics
- Imprint: Afternoon KC
- Magazine: Afternoon Season Zōkan
- Original run: August 10, 2000 – November 10, 2001
- Volumes: 1
- icon

Ohikkoshi (Japanese: おひっこし; lit. 'Moving') is a Japanese manga series written and illustrated by Hiroaki Samura. It was published in Kodansha's seinen manga magazine Afternoon Season Zōkan from August 2000 to November 2001, with its chapters collected in a single tankōbon volume alongside two other one-shot stories by Samura. It was licensed in North America by Dark Horse Comics.

== Overview ==
Ohikkoshi is an episodic five-chapter series following a group of art college students in Tokyo. Tono is an everyman who has a crush on the attractive Akagi, who already has a boyfriend that does volunteer work in Zambia; meanwhile, Tono's tomboyish best friend Koba, who performs in a rock band, has a crush on him.

Included in the tankōbon volume are two other unrelated one-shot stories. "Luncheon of Tears Diary (Vagabond Shōjo Manga-Ka)" is about a young shōjo manga artist who has to deal with unhinged demands from her editor that get her work cancelled, followed by a string of many bizarre and unrelated personal tragedies. In the end, she records her experiences in a highly-praised manga named after the story, before shooting her editor as revenge. "Kyoto Super Barhopping Journal (Bloodbath at Midorogaike)" is a semi-autobiographical story of Hiroaki Samura and his editor exploring Kyoto.

== Publication ==
Written and illustrated by Hiroaki Samura, Ohikkoshi was published in Kodansha's seinen manga magazine Afternoon Season Zōkan from August 10, 2000, to November 10, 2001. Kodansha collected its chapters in a single tankōbon volume, released on June 21, 2002. Also included in the volume are two one-shot stories by Samura: "Luncheon of Tears Diary (Vagabond Shōjo Manga-Ka)" and "Kyoto Super Barhopping Journal (Bloodbath at Midorogaike)", published in Afternoon Season Zōkan's second and first issues on February 10, 2000, and October 10, 1999, respectively.

In North America, the manga was licensed for English release by Dark Horse Comics and published as one volume on October 18, 2006.

=== Chapters ===
| No. | Original release date | Original ISBN | English release date | English ISBN |
|---|---|---|---|---|
| 1 | June 21, 2002 | 978-4-06-314296-9 | October 18, 2006 | 978-1-59307-622-1 |
"Ohikkoshi" (おひっこし); 1. "Lemon Kid" (レモンキッド, Remon Kiddo); 2. "Who Did That?!" (誰がそれを, Dare ga Sore O); 3. "All for Gain" (とくするからだ, Tokusuru Karada); 4. "The Sun" (太陽, Taiyō); 5. "New Days" (あたらしい日々, Atarashī Hibi); "Luncheon of Tears Diary (Vagabond Shōjo Manga-Ka)" (少女漫画家無宿 涙のランチョン日記, Shōjo Mangaka Mushuku Namida no Ranchon Nikki); "Kyoto Super Barhopping Journal (Bloodbath at Midorogaike)" (みどろヶ池に修羅を見た, Midorokaige ni Shura O Mita)
