= Blade of the Immortal =

Japanese manga series and its adaptations

- First tankōbon volume cover, featuring Manji

無限の住人 (Mugen no Jūnin)
- Genre: Dark fantasy; Historical fantasy; Martial arts
- Manga
- Written by: Hiroaki Samura
- Published by: Kodansha
- English publisher: NA: Dark Horse Comics
- Imprint: Afternoon KC
- Magazine: Monthly Afternoon
- Original run: June 25, 1993 – December 25, 2012
- Volumes: 30
Further information
Anime television series
Directed by	Kōichi Mashimo
Produced by	Katsushi Morishita; Noboru Yamada; Takuya Matsushita; Tetsuya Kinoshita
Written by	Hiroyuki Kawasaki
Music by	Kow Otani
Studio	Bee Train
Licensed by	NA: Media Blasters; UK: MVM Entertainment
Original network	AT-X
Original run	July 14, 2008 – December 29, 2008
Episodes	13
Novel
Blade of the Immortal: Legend of the Sword Demon
Written by	Junichi Ohsako
Illustrated by	Hiroaki Samura
Published by	Kodansha
English publisher	NA: Dark Horse Books
Published	July 18, 2008
Manga
Blade of the Immortal: Bakumatsu Arc
Written by	Kenji Takigawa; Hiroaki Samura (collaboration)
Illustrated by	Ryū Suenobu
Published by	Kodansha
Imprint	Afternoon KC
Magazine	Monthly Afternoon
Original run	May 25, 2019 – May 24, 2024
Volumes	10
Original net animation
Directed by	Hiroshi Hamasaki
Produced by	Hiroyuki Aoi; Kazuhiro Asou; Morio Kitaoka; Yasuo Tsubakimoto
Written by	Makoto Fukami
Music by	Eiko Ishibashi
Studio	Liden Films
Licensed by	Amazon Prime Video (streaming); Sentai Filmworks (home video)
Released	October 10, 2019 – March 25, 2020
Runtime	24 minutes
Episodes	24
- Live-action film
- Blade of the Immortal (2017)
- icon

Blade of the Immortal (Japanese: 無限の住人, Hepburn: Mugen no Jūnin; lit. 'The Inhabitant of Infinity') is a Japanese manga series written and illustrated by Hiroaki Samura. It was serialized in Kodansha's seinen manga magazine Monthly Afternoon from June 1993 to December 2012, with its chapters collected in 30 tankōbon volumes. The series is set in Japan during the mid-Tokugawa shogunate period and follows the cursed samurai Manji, who has to kill 1,000 evil men in order to regain his mortality.

A 2008 anime television series adaptation was produced by Bee Train. Also in 2008, the novel Blade of the Immortal: Legend of the Sword Demon was released by Kodansha. A live action film adaptation, Blade of the Immortal, was released in April 2017. A second anime adaptation by Liden Films was broadcast from October 2019 to March 2020. In North America, the manga has been published by Dark Horse Comics. The first anime series was licensed by Media Blasters. The second anime series is licensed by Amazon Prime Video.

A sequel manga series, titled Blade of the Immortal: Bakumatsu Arc, written by Kenji Takigawa in collaboration with Samura and illustrated by Ryū Suenobu, was serialized in Monthly Afternoon from May 2019 to May 2024. Its chapters were collected in 10 tankōbon volumes.

By May 2019, the manga had over 7.5 million copies in circulation. In 1997, Blade of the Immortal received the Excellence Award at the first Japan Media Arts Festival.

== Plot ==
Manji is a skilled rōnin cursed with immortality. After his violent past results in the deaths of 100 samurai, including his sister's husband, an 800-year-old nun named Yaobikuni grants him agelessness through "Sacred Bloodworms" (血仙蟲, Kessen-chū). These creatures heal even fatal wounds by merging with his body, enabling severed limbs to be reattached, though they cannot regenerate large-scale tissue loss. Seeking redemption, Manji vows to kill 1,000 evil men to end his immortality.

He allies with Rin Asano, a girl whose parents were murdered by Anotsu Kagehisa, leader of the rogue swordsmen group Ittō-ryū (逸刀流). Anotsu's philosophy embraces any technique that ensures victory, and his conquest of rival dōjōs forces survivors into exile. Opposing them is the shadowy Mugai-ryū (無骸流), which employs similarly ruthless methods. Though Manji briefly joins them, he abandons the group upon learning its members are death row convicts serving the shogunate. Despite his disdain for their most brutal agent, Shira, he maintains ties with other members while continuing his quest alongside Rin.

== Creation and conception ==
Samura stated that Tange Sazen was the largest influence on his characters and narrative style. In regards to the overall work he stated that he wanted to create a new style of manga, with his intended style being "Don't obsess about the details—just look at the story."

== Media ==
=== Manga ===
Written and illustrated by Hiroaki Samura, Blade of the Immortal originated as a one-shot published in Kodansha's seinen manga magazine Monthly Afternoon on June 25, 1993, (Note: Published in the August 1993 issue of Monthly Afternoon.) after it won the Grand Prize of the Summer 1993 Afternoon Shiki Shō (アフタヌーン四季賞; 'Afternoon Four Seasons Award'). It was turned into a full series which began serialization in Monthly Afternoon on December 25, 1993, (Note: Debuted in the magazine's February 1994 issue, released on December 25, 1993.) and finished on December 25, 2012. Kodansha collected its 207 chapters in 30 tankōbon volumes, released from September 22, 1994, to February 22, 2013. A 15-volume kanzenban edition was released from August 23, 2016, to February 23, 2017.

A sequel, titled Blade of the Immortal: Bakumatsu Arc (無限の住人～幕末ノ章～, Mugen no Jūnin: Bakumatsu no Shō), written by Kenji Takigawa and illustrated by Ryū Suenobu, with Samura's collaboration, was serialized in Monthly Afternoon from May 25, 2019, to May 24, 2024. Kodansha collected its chapters in ten tankōbon volumes, released from October 23, 2019, to August 22, 2024.

==== Dark Horse Comics release ====
Panel of the first "death" of Manji (Dark Horse Comics edition), arranged in a left-to-right orientation and with the onomatopoeia translated

The English language version of the manga was published by Dark Horse Comics. The manga began its publication in individual monthly issues, with the first issue being published on June 1, 1996. These issues were later collected into individual volumes, and the first one was published on March 1, 1997. On October 11, 2007, Dark Horse Comics announced that they would drop the monthly issues publishing, with issue #131, released on November 14, 2007, being the last one. The series continued publishing through trade paperback volumes only, starting with the 18th volume, released on February 6, 2008. The 31st and last collected volume was published on April 1, 2015.

To preserve the integrity of his art, Samura requested the publisher Dark Horse Comics not to "flip" the manga, that is, reverse the pages as if in a mirror. At the time, flipping was an almost universal practice for English-translated manga. Instead, Blade of the Immortal was modified for Western readers by the unusual method of cutting up the panels and rearranging them on the page in order to have the action flow from left to right. Another reason for not "flipping" the English version is Manji's clothing, which features a manji symbol, that if the pages were "flipped" would resemble specifically the Nazi swastika, instead of the ancient Eurasian swastika (that can be of any orientation), which for many cultures represents concepts such as peace and harmony.

Although American industry practice has largely changed over to publishing translated manga in its original right-to-left orientation, Blade of the Immortal had retained the labor-intensive cut-and-paste method. The publisher cautions that rearranging the panels is not foolproof, and can lead to continuity errors; this usually occurs when the flow of text bubbles is dependent upon character placement within panels. Some sound effects within the panel were retouched out and re-lettered in English. Japanese sound effects that are an integral part of the artwork were usually left as is. Additionally, some text bubbles or panel borders were redrawn, and script pacing subtly altered in order to understand the story or the placement of text bubbles.

In the monthly Dark Horse serialization, colored versions of title pages from the corresponding manga chapter were often featured as cover art, though in some cases different pieces of artwork, such as a tankōbon covers, were used as well. The original Japanese tankōbon volumes also collected more chapters than the English volumes published by Dark Horse, as such, they are longer and do not directly correspond to the English numbering scheme.

In July 2015, Dark Horse Comics announced an omnibus edition of Blade of the Immortal, each volume containing three original volumes, maintaining the left-to-right format. Ten volumes were released from December 28, 2016, to November 13, 2019. In March 2020, Dark Horse announced a deluxe re-release of the omnibus edition in hardcover. The volumes were released from October 7, 2020, to October 18, 2023.

=== Novel ===
A novel, titled Blade of the Immortal: Legend of the Sword Demon (無限の住人 刃獣異聞, Mugen no Jūnin Ninjū Ibun), written by Junichi Ohsako, with illustrations by Samura, was released by Kodansha on July 18, 2008. In North America, the novel was published by Dark Horse Books on January 27, 2010.

=== Anime ===
On March 23, 2008, it was announced that an animated television series adaptation of the manga would be directed by Kōichi Mashimo and produced by Bee Train in 2008. The series aired from July 14 to December 29, 2008, on AT-X. The opening theme is "Akai Usagi" (赤いウサギ; lit. 'Red Rabbit') by Makura no Sōshi, and the closing theme is "Wants" by Grapevine. In North America, Media Blasters licensed the series and released it on September 29, 2009.

A second anime adaptation titled was listed on the cover of the July issue of Monthly Afternoon on May 10, 2019. It was later announced that the anime adaptation would be a complete adaptation. The series is animated by Liden Films and directed by Hiroshi Hamasaki, with Makoto Fukami handling series composition, Shingo Ogiso designing the characters, and Eiko Ishibashi composing the music. It aired from October 10, 2019, to March 25, 2020, on Amazon Prime Video. Kiyoharu performed the series' opening theme song "Survive of Vision". On October 15, 2020, Sentai Filmworks announced that they had licensed the anime for home video and released it on Blu-ray Disc on January 19, 2021.

=== Film ===
In 2017, the manga was adapted into a live action film, directed by Takashi Miike with the screenplay by Tetsuya Oishi and starring Takuya Kimura as Manji.

== Reception ==
By February 2017, the manga had five million copies in circulation. By May 2019, it had over 7.5 million copies in circulation.

Blade of the Immortal won the Excellence Prize at the first Japan Media Arts Festival in 1997; and the Will Eisner Comic Industry Award in 2000 for Best U.S. Edition of Foreign Material.

Manga authors Masashi Kishimoto and Tatsuki Fujimoto have mentioned the series as an influence on their works.
