= List of Blade of the Immortal characters =

The Blade of the Immortal manga series features an extensive cast of characters created by Hiroaki Samura.

== Main characters ==
=== Manji ===
Voiced by: Tomokazu Seki (2008 series), Kenjiro Tsuda (2019 series) (Japanese); Keith Silverstein (2008 series), Andrew Love (2019 series) (English)
Portrayed by: Takuya Kimura

Manji (卍) is a former samurai who served the corrupt hatamoto Horii Shigenobu before killing him upon discovering his misrule. Branded an outlaw, he earned the epithet "Killer of 100" before receiving immortality from the eight-hundred-year-old nun Yaobikuni through kessen-chu bloodworms. Bound to kill 1,000 evil men to atone for his past, he reluctantly protects Rin Asano, seeing parallels to his deceased sister. A skilled but unconventional fighter, Manji employs multiple concealed weapons including the paired swords Shidō and Imo-no-Kami Tatsumasa, chained scythes Mumei, and the Kotengu sword-breaker. His immortality paradoxically frustrates him by diminishing his swordsmanship discipline.

=== Rin Asano ===
Voiced by: Rina Satō (2008 series), Ayane Sakura (2019 series) (Japanese); Mela Lee (2008 series), Juliet Simmons (2019 series) (English)
Portrayed by: Hana Sugisaki

Asano Rin (浅野 凛) is the sole survivor of the Ittō-ryū massacre and heir to the Mutenichi-ryū sword school. Though possessing only moderate swordsmanship skills, her burning desire for vengeance leads her to hire Manji as her bodyguard. Initially naive and immature, she gradually develops throughout her journey while struggling with moral doubts about her quest. Rin carries three weapons: the Chinese sword Kutoneshirika in a toju scabbard, a tantō dagger, and throwing knives called Ogunchu. Her unconventional armament and fighting style draw criticism from Anotsu Kagehisa, who claims she resembles the Ittō-ryū more than her own school. After briefly traveling with Anotsu, she parts ways while maintaining her determination to eventually kill him. The character develops unreciprocated romantic feelings for Manji.

== Ittō-ryū ==
=== Anotsu Kagehisa ===
Voiced by: Hirofumi Nojima (2008 series), Nozomu Sasaki (2019 series) (Japanese); Ezra Weisz (2008 series), Adam Gibbs (2019 series) (English)
Portrayed by: Sota Fukushi

Anotsu Kagehisa (天津 影久) is the leader of the Ittō-ryū, a sword school emphasizing practical lethality over traditional forms. Trained by his disgraced swordsman grandfather, he demonstrates exceptional skill with his signature Nepalese-style Kabutsuchi axe and a matching sword used less frequently. His conflict with Habaki Kagimura culminates in a decisive duel where Anotsu emerges victorious but weakened. When Manji later spares him, Rin wounds Anotsu during his escape, though his ultimate fate remains uncertain. Throughout these events, Anotsu shows unexpected restraint, allowing Rin to accompany him despite her hostile intentions toward him.

=== Magatsu Taito ===
Voiced by: Kazuya Nakai (2008 series), Tatsuhisa Suzuki (2019 series) (Japanese); Derek Stephen Prince (2008 series), Michael Wronski (2019 series) (English)
Portrayed by: Shinnosuke Mitsushima

Magatsu Taito (凶 戴斗) ranks among the Ittō-ryū's most skilled swordsmen. A peasant who turned to swordsmanship after samurai killed his sister, he operates outside the samurai class as a kenshi. His weapon, the Grand Turk, features three concealed blades in a guardless design: a gladius-style main blade, a secondary short sword, and a dagger concealed in the pommel. Though initially allied with Anotsu Kagehisa, Taito leaves the Ittō-ryū when it aligns with the shogunate, maintaining personal ties while opposing the government. His quest to avenge his lover O-Ren leads to repeated confrontations with Shira, culminating in their final battle where Taito severs Shira's remaining hand. After these events, he rejoins the Ittō-ryū while maintaining an uneasy alliance with Manji. Magatsu survives the final battle against Kagimura's forces, and gives up the sword to live as an anonymous farmer in Edo.

=== Otono-Tachibana Makie ===
Voiced by: Mamiko Noto (2008 series), Houko Kuwashima (2019 series) (Japanese); Laura Bailey (2008 series), Christina Kelly (2019 series) (English)
Portrayed by: Erika Toda

Otono-Tachibana Makie (乙橘 槇絵) is a master swordswoman whose exceptional skill equals Anotsu Kagehisa's. Born into a samurai family, she inherited her clan's formidable swordsmanship talent but was disowned after defeating her older brother in combat. Though initially training to avenge her mother Otono-Tachibana Fuki (乙橘吹), she became a geisha after Anotsu purchased her freedom from a brothel, unable to reconcile her lethal abilities with the act of killing. Her signature weapon, the double-bladed Haru-no-Okina staff, remains concealed within a shamisen. After temporarily abandoning swordsmanship following her father's death, she rejoins Anotsu as his protector despite developing the same lung condition that killed her father. During the final confrontation with Habaki Kagimura's forces, she demonstrates her unparalleled skill before succumbing to mortal wounds sustained while eliminating Hanabusa's ambush party.

=== Other members ===
Abayama Sōsuke (阿葉山 宗介)
Voiced by: Shinya Fukumatsu (2019 series) (Japanese); Josh Morrison (2019 series) (English)
Portrayed by: Renji Ishibashi
A second-in-command of the Ittō-ryū, combining formidable swordsmanship with administrative acumen. Despite his age and missing right arm, he remains among the group's most capable fighters, employing a concealed dagger-machete hybrid and three weighted chains in place of his absent limb. His confrontation with Giichi leaves him severely wounded. He is later shown with a deteriorated health, cared for by his granddaughter.
Kuroi Sabato (黒衣 鯖人)
Voiced by: Masashi Ebara (2008 series), Eiji Hanawa (2019 series) (Japanese); Artt Butler (2008 series), Eric Chase (2019 series) (English)
Portrayed by: Kazuki Kitamura
An Ittō-ryū master swordsman trained by Anotsu Saburō. Known for his disturbing practice of preserving his deceased wife and Rin's mother's heads through taxidermy, he carries them mounted on his shoulders. His combat style incorporates twin shuriken called karasu alongside his sword skills. He dies combating against Manji.
Kawakami Araya (川上 新夜)
Voiced by: Daisuke Namikawa (2008 series), Masato Obara (2019 series) (Japanese); Liam O'Brien (2008 series), Jack Ivy (2019 series) (English)
An Ittō-ryū swordsman who conceals his violent past while working as a mask-maker. He leads the assault on Rin's mother and maintains this secret from his son Renzo. When Manji kills Araya, Renzo attacks in retaliation before learning uncomfortable truths about his father's history during the burial. Rin's ambiguous remarks about painful pasts leave Renzo questioning his father's legacy.
Shizuma Eiku (閑馬 永空)
Voiced by: Katsuyuki Konishi (2008 series), Shunsuke Sakuya (2019 series) (Japanese); James Hoover (2008 series), Joe Daniels (2019 series) (English)
Portrayed by: Ichikawa Ebizō XI
Eiku is an immortal swordsman who wears the traditional basket hat of a komusō monk. Like Manji, he possesses kessen-chu bloodworms granted during the Muromachi period, making him over two hundred years old. He wields poisoned weapons—a dagger and saber both named Inoue Shinkai Kosatsu ("Wormkiller")—coated with kessen-satsu toxin. Eiku attempts to recruit Manji against Anotsu Kagehisa but is killed by Manji in their final confrontation.
Higa (火瓦)
Higa is an Ittō-ryū swordsman obsessed with acquiring Manji's immortality. He wields a Southeast Asian blade called Kamujin (Godblade). After losing both arms in combat, he continues attacking Hyakurin by biting her throat before Shinriji beheads him.
Hanada (花田)
Hanada is an Ittō-ryū swordsman who avoids sunlight and wields Enchū-maru—paired narrow swords with hooked and straight blade extensions requiring precise strikes to kill. His distinctive glasses feature mismatched lenses, one round and one rectangular. Manji ultimately kills him in combat.
Uruma (宇留間)
Portrayed by: Masayuki Deai
A composed Ittō-ryū swordsman wields Ondeko-bachi (Devil's Drumstick), a large machete-like weapon, and a spiked chain for immobilizing opponents. Manji kills this fighter in combat.
Kinuka (鬼抜)
A Ittō-ryū swordsman who orchestrates Hyakurin's capture and Shinriji's death. Giichi kills him in combat.
Tamasaki (珠崎)
An enraged Ittō-ryū swordsman serving under Kinuka develops muscle deterioration from Hyakurin's poison, becoming singularly obsessed with revenge. Hyakurin ultimately kills him.
Saikaya (賽河屋)
Ittō-ryū swordsman living as a doctor, charged with killing Shira and Manji. Mercilessly killed by Shira.
Iwami Ginzan (石見 銀山)
Ittō-ryū swordsman living as a herbalist. Charged with the duty of killing Shira and Manji. Suffers the same fate as Saikaya.
Wayan Kurishige (把山 繰重)
An Ittō-ryū swordsman becomes one of the group's ten core members after Giichi and Habaki Kagimura eliminate several dojo leaders. He bears a distinctive star-shaped scar over his left eye from a bear attack in his youth, which influences his combat style. Using a poison-soaked sword and finishing dagger, he participates in Rin's kidnapping as bait for Manji. Manji kills him in their confrontation.
Kasori Fujiaki (圭反 藤諒)
An Ittō-ryū swordsman among the group's ten core members acquires Eiku Shizuma's kessen-satsu poison to use against Manji. Giichi kills him in combat.
Yoshino Doa (吉乃 瞳阿)
Doa (formerly Kuichiru and Towa) is a short-tempered Ittō-ryū swordswoman who wields a spearhead dagger. A later recruit who deeply admires Anotsu, she fights alongside Isaku using complementary styles—her aggressive offense pairing with his defensive techniques. Of Ainu upbringing in Hokkaido though never fully accepted, she befriends Rin Asano despite her impulsive combat nature. Anotsu gave her current name from a novel to improve her literacy.
Yasonokami Isaku (八苑狼 夷作)
Isaku is a physically imposing Ittō-ryū member who forgoes traditional weapons in favor of defensive armor. He forms a close combat partnership with Doa, balancing her aggressive attacks with his protective techniques. Born to a Portuguese Christian priest, his gentle nature contrasts with his formidable presence. After being bisected during Habaki's experiments, Doa reconstructs him, granting temporary regenerative abilities that gradually diminish. He develops a friendship with Rin Asano during these events.
Kashin Koji (果心居士)
Operating under the alias Mizushina-sensei (水科 先生), serves as both physician and spy for the Ittō-ryū's core leadership. The elderly, white-bearded doctor secretly maps Habaki Kagimura's castle while providing medical services, intelligence later used by Rin and Doa during their infiltration. Ryo of the Rokki-Dan kills him in combat.
Ozuhan (怖畔)
A masked core member of the Ittō-ryū communicates exclusively through sign language and simple sounds. Known for his feared hypnotic flute (to which he alone is immune) and exceptional agility, he avoids most combat traps. After infiltrating Habaki's stronghold to assist Rin and Doa, he escapes during Anotsu's raid but becomes separated from the group.
Baro Sukezane (馬絽 祐実)
A highly skilled Ittō-ryū swordsman and core member who specializes in espionage. He wields two katana with exceptional proficiency, along with a distinctive nodachi featuring blade holes that maintain his swift combat speed. Identifiable by a prominent nose scar—which causes Manji to be mistaken for him—he ultimately sacrifices himself against shogunate forces to enable Anotsu and Magatsu's escape after their Edo Castle raid.

== Mugai-ryū ==
=== Habaki Kagimura ===
Voiced by: Takayuki Sugo (2008 series), Jouji Nakata (2019 series) (Japanese); Kirk Thornton (2008 series), John Swasey (2019 series) (English)
Portrayed by: Min Tanaka

Habaki Kagimura (吐 鉤群) commands the Shogun's Banshu samurai while secretly leading both the Mugai-ryū and later the Rokki-Dan. A skilled swordsman, he orchestrates the Ittō-ryū massacre during their supposed induction into the Banshu. After losing an eye to Manji and being removed from office, he receives one final month to eliminate the Ittō-ryū. His relentless pursuit culminates in a duel with Anotsu where blindness and Manji's interference prove fatal.

=== Hyakurin ===
Voiced by: Megumi Toyoguchi (2008 series), Marika Hayashi (2019 series) (Japanese); Karen Strassman (2008 series), Katelyn Barr (2019 series) (English)
Portrayed by: Chiaki Kuriyama

Hyakurin (百琳, Hyakurin), a blonde-haired assassin and lieutenant in the Mugai-ryū, joins after killing her abusive husband who murdered their two children. Her blonde hair is not natural, but the result of compulsively dyeing her hair to remove blood stains. Specializing in poisons, she wields Burafuma—a collapsible wrist-mounted crossbow with poisoned bolts and concealed blades. Though her sword skills are mediocre, her chemical expertise proves lethal until torture damages her combat effectiveness. After becoming pregnant during service, she leaves the Mugai-ryū through Kagimura's arrangement with Giichi, rejecting motherhood due to traumatic associations with Shinriji's death and her rape by Ittō-ryū members.

=== Shira ===
Voiced by: Shin-ichiro Miki (2008 series), Tōru Nara (2019 series) (Japanese); Jason Wishnov (2008 series), David Wald (2019 series) (English)
Portrayed by: Hayato Ichihara

Shira (尸良) is a sadistic Mugai-ryū assassin who tortures victims for pleasure. After murdering O-Ren and mutilating Anotsu's associates, he loses a hand to Manji during an attempted rape. The trauma whitens his hair and drives him to sharpen his exposed bones as weapons. Betraying the Mugai-ryū, he causes Shinriji's death and Hyakurin's capture. Magatsu removes his remaining hand before imprisonment with Manji, where he grafts Manji's arm to gain immortality. His weakened bloodworms fail during winter combat, and dying from injuries, he warns Nakazato against vengeance. Shira wields a serrated ninjatō designed to maximize suffering.

=== Giichi ===
Voiced by: Toshiyuki Morikawa (2008 series), Hiroshi Shirokuma (2019 series) (Japanese); David Vincent (2008 series), Courtland Johnson (2019 series) (English)
Portrayed by: Takashi Kitadai

Giichi (偽一) stands as the most lethal Mugai-ryū assassin after Shira. A former shipwright, he turned to crime to fund medical care for his sickly son Tojiro before being recruited by Kagimura. His combat prowess claims 59 Ittō-ryū lives, earning him freedom that loses meaning when Tojiro dies. He wields Kanetsura's Mito-no-Kami—a modified farming tool functioning as a bladed chain weapon—until Manji destroys it, after which he temporarily uses Manji's loaned twin-chained blades. After the Mugai-ryū's dissolution, Rin and Hyakurin find him living among the burakumin. Though emotionally broken, he intervenes when Hyakurin attempts to terminate her pregnancy, eventually raising her child. In his final mission, he defeats Abayama Sosuke in a brutal fight, losing an ear in the process.

=== Shinriji ===
Voiced by: Yuya Uchida (2008 series), Chikahiro Kobayashi (2019 series) (Japanese); Kirk Thornton (2008 series), Scott Gibbs (2019 series) (English)

Shinriji (真理路), an unskilled Mugai-ryū swordsman with a criminal past as a thief, joins after a failed embezzlement attempt from his silk merchant employer. Though clumsy in combat, he demonstrates spatial awareness and untapped potential. He develops strong attachment to Hyakurin, seeing maternal qualities in her blonde hair reminiscent of his foreign mother. Kinuka kills him after he eliminates four Ittō-ryū members, but not before he uses his dying position to signal Hyakurin's location in Edo's Tatsumi district. Hyakurin honors him by cutting her hair and placing it on his grave.

=== Makoto ===
Voiced by: Wataru Hatano (2008 series), Shūichirō Umeda (2019 series) (Japanese); Jason Wishnov (2008 series), Antonio Lasanta (2019 series) (English)

Makoto (真琴), a former male prostitute, infiltrates the Ittō-ryū as the Mugai-ryū's mole. Posing as a page handling weapons and correspondence, he poisons the Ittō-ryū during their unification feast with the Banshu. Abayama eventually kills him for his betrayal.

== Shingyoto-ryū ==
Ibane Kensui (伊羽 研水)
Portrayed by: Tsutomu Yamazaki
The sensei of Shingyoto-ryū in Kaga shares philosophical alignment with the Ittō-ryū. He offers Anotsu his dōjō in exchange for marrying his foster daughter Hisoka, but later betrays Anotsu under bakufu pressure. He ultimately dies by suicide.
Ibane Hisoka (伊羽 密花)
Hisoka, foster daughter of Ibane Kensui and granddaughter of his former master, suffers from chronic illness and near-blindness due to essential medications. Despite physical frailty, she demonstrates keen perception. Her arranged marriage to Anotsu Kagehisa ends when the Shogunate forces Kensui's betrayal. After helping Anotsu escape Kaga, she dies by suicide.
Iriya (入谷, Irīa)
A student of Ibane Kensui and unrequited admirer of Hisoka, he challenges Anotsu to a duel but is humiliated. Seeking revenge for the deaths of Kensui and Hisoka, he is ultimately killed by an injured Anotsu.
Kozue (虎杖)
A senior student of Ibane Kensui maintains a humble demeanor distinct from his peers' hostility toward Anotsu. Unlike other disciples, he demonstrates no resentment toward the Ittō-ryū leader. Magatsu likely kills him during the conflict.

== Immortality Experiment Officials ==
Ayame Burando (綾目 歩蘭人)
Burando, a physician exiled for studying Western medicine, is recruited by Kagimura to research immortality after Mouzen's failure. His brutal experiments on Manji and other prisoners yield partial results but drive him to madness. After Rin frees Manji, Burando escapes and attempts atonement by secretly aiding the families of his victims with medical care.
Mouzen (孟膳, Mōzen)
Mouzen, an experienced physician, is recruited by Kagimura alongside Burando to research immortality through experiments on Manji. When his efforts fail within the allotted timeframe, he is presumably executed.
Dewanosuke (出羽介)
Dewanosuke, a convicted thief, becomes Burando's experimental subject in immortality research. Though initially showing promising results, Kagimura kills him during testing by running a sword through his chest.
Toraemon (虎右ェ門)
A swordsman assisting Burando's immortality experiments, tasked with amputating subjects' limbs as required. His precise blade work proves crucial to the research.
Yamada Asaemon Yoshirō (山田 浅右衛門 吉寛)
A skilled samurai who performs surgical dismemberments on Manji during Burando's immortality experiments. When Rin and Doa attempt to rescue Manji, Asaemon confronts them in the cell but is killed by the awakened Manji. Manji later uses Asaemon's liver as medicinal treatment for Makie's tuberculosis, despite her objections.

== Rokki-dan ==
Rokki-dan (六鬼団, Six Demon Group) are a private army divided into six divisions and fall under Kagimura's direct command. They are the successors to the Mugai-ryu and also consist of criminals. Should they fail to destroy the Itto-ryu before Kagimura's execution, they will be executed as well.

Haiyabou (佩矢坊, Haiyabō)
A masked member of the Rokki-dan's Onihana division wields a halberd in combat. Sukezane Baro kills him, exploiting the superior speed of his specialized nodachi to overcome the halberdier's defenses.
Soma Ryo (杣 燎)
Ryo, Kagimura Kagimura's illegitimate daughter, works as a woodcutter while maintaining secret devotion to her father. Though Kagimura's official family remains unaware of her existence, she deeply cares for them. Despite mediocre swordsmanship skills compared to other warriors, she joins the Rokki-dan's Onihana division to support Kagimura. After surviving a mission that kills Koji Kashin, Kagimura discharges her from service. Magatsu later finds her ill and reluctantly allows her to accompany him. She dies shielding Kagimura from Hanabusa's gunmen.
Ban Inroku (伴 殷六)
A skilled marksman of the Rokki-dan's Onihana division specializes in firearms. He dies during a joint mission with Ryo to eliminate Ittō-ryū members.
Arashino Shishiya (荒篠 獅子也)
Arashino, a physically imposing member of the Rokki-dan's Onihana division, fights with crushing wide-bladed weapons while wearing heavy armor that restricts opponents' attacks. Though he bisects Manji during combat, Rin manipulates his pity by feigning Manji's vulnerability before setting Arashino ablaze, enabling Manji to kill him.
Doma Shinhei (弩馬 心兵)
A Rokki-dan Onihana division member wields a nunchaku-like weapon with unmastered but effective mid-range techniques, including the rapid "Skyward Snake" style. Though skilled enough to temporarily hold his own against Makie, he retreats when realizing continued combat would prove fatal. Makie ultimately kills him during a failed Rokki-dan ambush.
Hasshu Tarieshin (八宗 足江進)
A foreign-born member of the Rokki-dan's Onihana division wears Western attire and wields spear-like weapons. His fear of boats limits his mobility unless absolutely necessary. After retreating with Doma from Makie during one encounter, she ultimately kills him when the Rokki-dan's ambush fails. His foreign status made him a criminal under Edo-period Japanese law.
Murasaki Shozo (叢咲 正造)
A hooded Rokki-dan enforcer with distinctive facial features specializes in interrogation through torture, targeting relatives of Ittō-ryū members. He wields an acid-spewing spear in combat until Amon, a minor Ittō-ryū fighter, kills him.
Meguro (目黒)
Meguro (real name Koto (こと)), is a kunoichi in Kagimura's Rokki-dan, who studies under Master Sori while harboring unrequited feelings for him. Her lack of artistic ability and poor cooking skills do little to impress Sori, who remains oblivious to her affections. She forms a friendship with Rin Asano during Rin's time as Sori's housekeeper.
Tanpopo (たんぽぽ)
Tanpopo (real name Urara (麗)) is a kunoichi serving in the Rokki-dan alongside Meguro. As fellow students of Master Sori, she demonstrates greater artistic skill than Meguro. Both know Rin Asano, who becomes Sori's housekeeper after his daughter Tatsu's marriage.
Mitake (御岳)
A trusted retainer of Kagimura who oversees Ryo's guardianship following Kagimura's planned execution. He aids in organizing the Rokki-dan's pursuit of the Ittō-ryū. During a failed attack on Makie with Doma and Tarieshin—where both comrades die and he loses his hands—he pleads with Giichi to kill her. After Anotsu slays Kagimura, Magatsu assists him in committing seppuku.

== Other characters ==
Yaobikuni (八百比丘尼)
Voiced by: Hisako Kyōda (2008 series), Ako Mayama (2019 series) (Japanese); Louise Chamis (2008 series), Vicki Barosh (2019 series) (English)
Portrayed by: Yoko Yamamoto
Yaobikuni, an eight-hundred-year-old nun with spiral facial tattoos, possesses the same kessen-chu bloodworms she imparted to Manji and Shizuma. She encounters Rin Asano at her father's gravesite and directs her to recruit Manji as her protector.
Machi (町)
Voiced by: Maaya Sakamoto (2008 series) (Japanese); Cristina Vee (2008 series) (English)
Portrayed by: Hana Sugisaki
Manji's younger sister who marries official Saitō Tatsumasa. After witnessing Manji kill Tatsumasa in self-defense, she suffers mental regression to a childlike state. Her subsequent murder by Manji's enemies drives him to seek redemption through Yaobikuni's offer: killing 1,000 evil men in exchange for ending his immortality.
Johnny Gyobutsu (序仁 魚仏, Jonī Gyobutsu)
Voiced by: Kōhei Kiyasu (2008 series)
Gyobutsu is a Western-influenced assassin posing as a Christian priest. Using a flintlock pistol marked "Divina", he executes criminals who confess to him. Manji kills him in their first encounter, making him the initial named victim in the series.
Shido Hishiyasu (司戸 菱安)
Voiced by: Kentarō Itō (2008 series), Taisuke Nakano (2019 series) (Japanese); Kyle Hebert (2008 series), Blake Jackson (2019 series) (English)
Portrayed by: Ken Kaneko
Shido Hishiyasu leads the notorious Shinsengumi ronin gang. After Manji kills his brother, Hishiyasu kidnaps Manji's sister Machi as bait for revenge. When Manji refuses armed combat, Hishiyasu releases then murders Machi, prompting Manji to annihilate the entire gang. Hishiyasu wields distinctive pronged swords marked "Acid" on their tsuba.
Sori (宗理)
Voiced by: Toshihiko Seki (2008 series), Tomokazu Seki (2019 series) (Japanese); Ty Mahany (2019 series) (English)
A high-ranking spy and art-obsessed ninja, engages in political intrigue to acquire forbidden European artworks. Childhood friends with the Asano clan, he initially refuses Rin's request for help against the Ittō-ryū but later provides financial assistance. After tending to an injured Manji, he reveals the Mugai-ryū's backers. He employs Magatsu to protect his daughter Tatsu during his artistic travels, displaying particular interest in Magatsu that Manji later observes.
Tatsu (辰) / Tatsubo
Sōri's daughter, is a practical woman unaware of her father's espionage activities. A childhood friend of Rin, she nurses the severely wounded Manji after his Ittō-ryū confrontation. Though Magatsu abandons his guard post to pursue Shira, Tatsu capably maintains her household. After a brief marriage to a merchant's son—ended due to his overbearing nature—she returns home just as Rin and Manji depart to find Anotsu.
Kawakami Renzo (川上 錬造)
Voiced by: Motoko Kumai (2008 series), Ayumu Murase (2019 series) (Japanese); Bryson Baugus (2019 series) (English)
Renzo, son of Ittō-ryū member Kawakami Araya, befriends Rin before learning his father raped and murdered her mother. Rin and Manji stage Araya's murder to spare Renzo from inheriting a cycle of vengeance. Orphaned by this deception, Renzo becomes Shira's protege and literal prosthetic hand. After Shira's death, Magatsu persuades Renzo to return to Edo and learn the truth regarding the Ittō-ryū and his own father instead of seeking revenge on Rin. Renzo eventually chooses to apprentice under Sōri as an artist and find meaning through art, but is unable to forgive Rin because he believes that she was foolish seeking revenge herself while trying to deter him.
Habaki Shima (吐 志摩) and Habaki Sakutaro (吐 索太郎)
Shima, Kagimura's strong-willed wife, demonstrates fierce loyalty when she and their son Sakutaro are imprisoned following Kagimura's political downfall. Recognizing Ryo as Kagimura's illegitimate daughter during a rescue attempt, Shima kills Sakutaro and herself to remove all obstacles to Kagimura's mission against the Ittō-ryū. Their deaths profoundly affect Kagimura, revealing his deep familial attachments.
Ugen Hanabusa (英于彦, Hanabusa Ugen)
Hanabusa, Kagimura's former subordinate, succeeds him after the failure to eliminate the Ittō-ryū and produce viable immortality results. Though politically cunning, Hanabusa ultimately proves ineffective—his schemes against the Ittō-ryū falter due to his inferior strategic foresight compared to Kagimura and inability to counter Anotsu's tactics.
Fuyu (布由)
Voiced by: Ayane Sakura
Introduced by Yaobikuni to Manji as the young granddaughter of one of Manji's acquaintances, 90 years after Manji parted ways with Rin. Fuyu's father and his younger brother are in a dispute over the succession of their sword dojo and the younger brother had threatened to kidnap his niece; as a result, Yaobikuni intends for Manji to become Fuyu's bodyguard. It is implied that Fuyu is a descendant of Rin when she presents Manji with a knife that she inherited from her great-great-grandmother, with a sheath carved with a pattern once made by Rin. Manji accepts the responsibility of caring for Fuyu and they depart from Edo together.
