= Hiroaki Samura =

Japanese manga artist (born 1970)

Hiroaki Samura 沙村 広明
- Born: February 17, 1970 (age 56) Chiba Prefecture, Japan
- Area: Manga artist
- Notable works: Blade of the Immortal

Hiroaki Samura (沙村 広明, Samura Hiroaki; born February 17, 1970) is a Japanese manga artist, known for Blade of the Immortal, as well as several other short works. He has also done various illustrations for magazines and ero guro work.

== Education ==
Samura says that he always wanted to be a manga artist. However, unlike most manga artists, he attended art school for a time and has a classical art education. He disliked oil painting and prefers to work in black and white. He says that he disliked oil painting from the start because of the smell of the paint and employed someone to help himself cheat to get through the course, which he is quite open about in interviews. He never completed the course because he was picked up by Monthly Afternoon before graduating to do Blade of the Immortal.

== Works ==
=== Manga ===
- Blade of the Immortal (無限の住人, Mugen no Jūnin; lit. "The Inhabitant of Infinity") (1993–2012; serialized in Monthly Afternoon)
- Ohikkoshi (竹易てあし漫画全集 おひっこし, Takeiteashi Manga Zenshū: Ohikkoshi; lit. "Takeiteasy Comics Complete Works: Ohikkoshi") (2002; published by Afternoon KC)
  - Ohikkoshi (おひっこし) (2000; published in Afternoon Season Zōkan)
  - Luncheon of Tears Diary (Vagabond Shoujo Manga-ka) (少女漫画家無宿 涙のランチョン日記, Shōjo Manga-ka Mushuku: Namida no Ranchon Nikki) (2000; published in Afternoon Season Zōkan)
- Bradherley's Coach (ブラッドハーレーの馬車, Buraddohārē no Basha) (2005–2007; serialized in Manga Erotics F)
- Hiroaki Samura's Emerald and Other Stories (シスタージェネレーター 沙村広明短編集, Shisutā Jenerētā Samura Hiroaki Tanpenshū; lit. "Sister Generator: Hioraki Samura Anthology") (2009; published by Afternoon KC)
  - Emerald (エメラルド, Emerarudo) (2004; published in Monthly Afternoon)
  - The Kusein Family's Grandest Show (久誓院家最大のショウ, Kusein-ke Saidai no Shō) (2009; published in Monthly Afternoon)
  - The Uniforms Stay On (制服は脱げない, Seifuku wa Nugenai) (2005–2006; serialized in QuickJapan)
  - Brigitte's Dinner (ブリギットの晩餐, Burigitto no Bansan) (2006; published in Monthly Afternoon)
  - Shizuru Cinema (シズルキネマ, Shizuru Kinema) (2008; published in Monthly Comic Flapper)
  - Low-grade Strategy: The Mirror Play (下層戦略 鏡打ち, Kasō Senryaku: Kagami-uchi) (2006; published in Kindai Mahjong Original)
  - Youth Chang-Chaka-Chang (青春じゃんじゃかじゃかじゃか, Seishun Jan-Jaka-Jaka-Jaka) (2003; doujinshi)
- Halcyon Lunch (ハルシオン・ランチ, Harushion Ranchi) (2008–2011; serialized in good! Afternoon)
- Fantastic Gynaecocracy (幻想ギネコクラシー, Gensō Ginekokurashī) (2010–2017; serialized in Rakuen Le Paradis)
- Die Wergelder (べアゲルター, Beagerutā) (2011–present; serialized in Nemesis (2011–2018) and Monthly Shōnen Sirius (2018–present))
- Spring Breeze Snegurochka (春風のスネグラチカ, Harukaze no Sunegurachika) (2013–2014; serialized in Manga Erotics F; 18th Japan Media Arts Festival Excellence Award)
- Wave, Listen to Me! (波よ聞いてくれ, Nami yo Kiitekure) (2014–present; serialized in Monthly Afternoon)

=== Doujinshi ===
- Night of the Succubus (サッカバスの夜, Sakkabasu no Yoru)

=== Illustrations ===
- The Love of the Brute (人でなしの恋, Hitodenashi no Koi), an illustration series of adult themed pencil drawings (extreme violence and sexual material). The illustrations were published from 1998 to 2006. The series jumped from one publication to the next and featured in both erotic and pornographic ''tankōbon such as "Tokyo H" and "Manga Erotics F", youth and art magazines such as "QuickJapan" and "Comickers", before finally being collected in an artbook.
- Cover art for the Japanese version of Blood Will Tell, a video game based on Osamu Tezuka's Dororo.
